= Southern Hemisphere =

Half of Earth that is south of the Equator

The Southern Hemisphere is highlighted in yellow. The hemispheres appear to be unequal in this image because Antarctica is not shown.

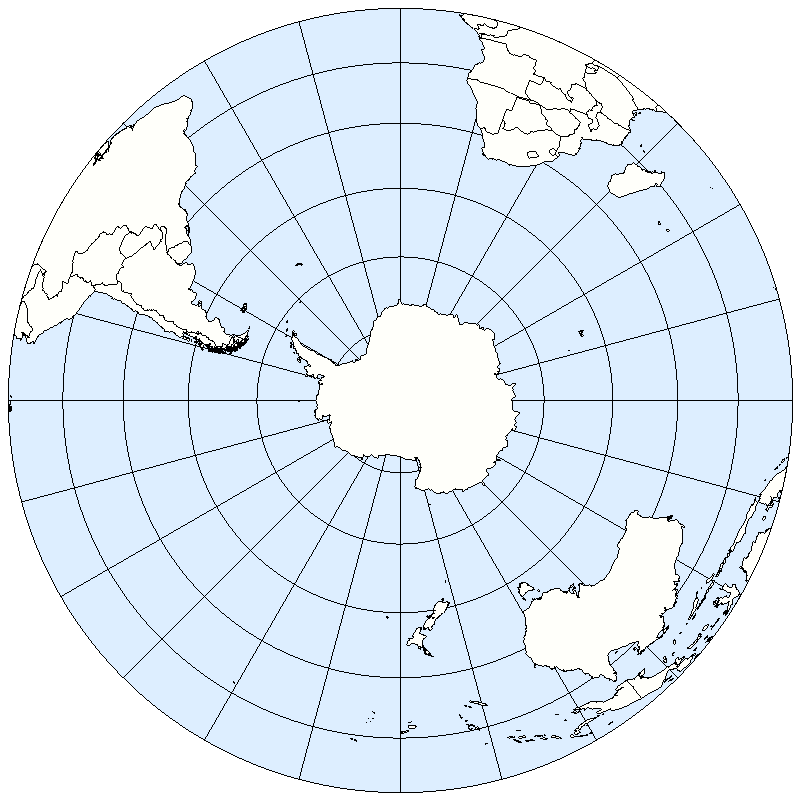
The Southern Hemisphere from above the South Pole

The Southern Hemisphere is the half (hemisphere) of Earth that is south of the equator. It contains all or part of five continents (the whole of Antarctica, the whole of Oceania, about 90% of South America, about one-third of Africa, and some islands off the continental mainland of Asia) and four oceans (the whole Southern Ocean, the majority of the Indian Ocean, the South Atlantic Ocean, and the South Pacific Ocean), as well as New Zealand and most of the Pacific Islands in Oceania. Its surface is 80.9% water, compared with 60.7% water in the Northern Hemisphere, and it contains 32.7% of Earth's land. More than 850 million people live in the Southern Hemisphere, representing around 10–12% of the total global human population.

Owing to the tilt of Earth's rotation relative to the Sun and the ecliptic plane, summer is from December to February (inclusive) and winter is from June to August (inclusive). September 22 or 23 is the vernal equinox and March 20 or 21 is the autumnal equinox. The South Pole is in the centre of the southern hemispherical region.

== Characteristics ==
Southern Hemisphere climates tend to be slightly milder than those at similar latitudes in the Northern Hemisphere, except in the Antarctic which is colder than the Arctic. This is because the Southern Hemisphere has significantly more ocean and much less land; water heats up and cools down more slowly than land. The differences are also attributed to oceanic heat transfer and differing extents of greenhouse trapping.

Antarctica's Vostok Station holds the record for the Southern Hemisphere's lowest temperature at −89.2 °C (−128.6 °F) on July 21, 1983. This is also the lowest temperature ever recorded on earth. The lowest temperature ever recorded in the Northern Hemisphere was a −69.6 °C (−93.3 °F) reading at the Klinck Automatic Weather Station in Greenland on December 22, 1991. The Southern Hemisphere's highest recorded temperature is tied at 50.7 °C (123.3 °F) between Oodnadatta, South Australia, on January 2, 1960, and Onslow, Western Australia, on January 13, 2022. Globally, a 1922 reading of 58 °C (136.4 °F) in El Azizia, Libya, was long cited as the world record before the World Meteorological Organization decertified it in 2012 due to measurement errors. The 56.7 °C (134 °F) temperature recorded in Death Valley, California, on July 10, 1913, replaced the invalidated Libya record.

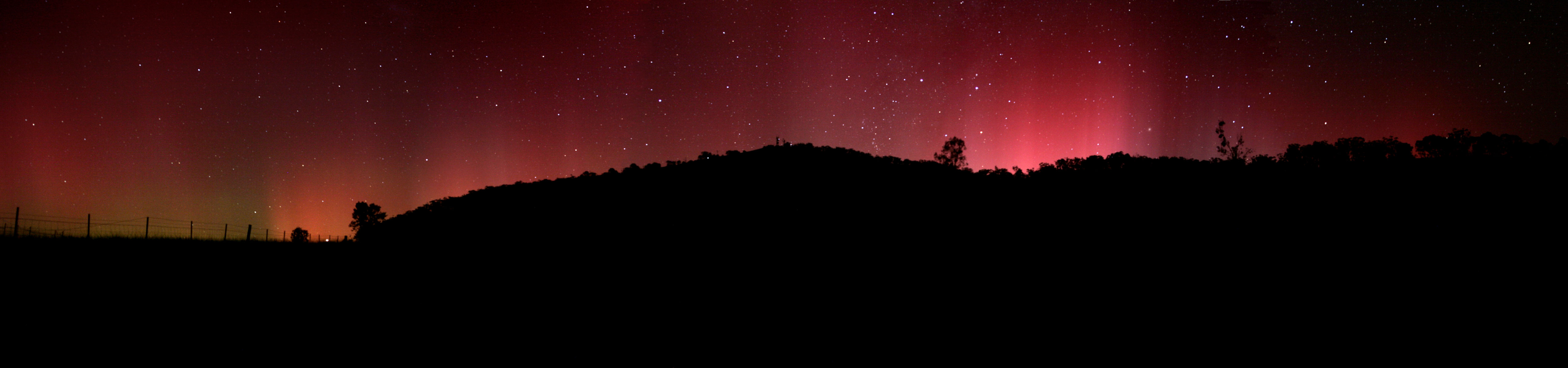
Aurora australis appearing in the night sky of Swifts Creek, 100 km (62 mi) north of Lakes Entrance, Victoria, Australia

In the Southern Hemisphere, the Sun passes from east to west through the north, although north of the Tropic of Capricorn the mean Sun can be directly overhead or due south at midday. The Sun follows a right-to-left trajectory through the northern sky unlike the left-to-right motion of the Sun when seen from the Northern Hemisphere as it passes through the southern sky. Sun-cast shadows turn anticlockwise throughout the day and sundials have the hours increasing in the anticlockwise direction. During solar eclipses viewed from a point to the south of the Tropic of Capricorn, the Moon moves from left to right on the disc of the Sun (see, for example, photos with timings of the solar eclipse of November 13, 2012), while viewed from a point to the north of the Tropic of Cancer (i.e., in the Northern Hemisphere), the Moon moves from right to left during solar eclipses.

The Coriolis effect causes cyclones and tropical storms to spin clockwise in the Southern Hemisphere, as opposed to anticlockwise in the Northern Hemisphere.

The southern temperate zone, a subsection of the Southern Hemisphere, is nearly all oceanic.

The constellation Sagittarius that includes the galactic centre is a southern constellation as well as both Magellanic Clouds. This, combined with clearer skies, makes for excellent viewing of the night sky from the Southern Hemisphere with brighter and more numerous stars.

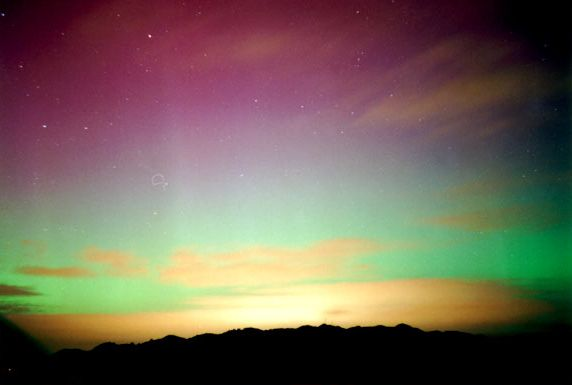
Aurora australis appearing from Stewart Island/Rakiura in the south of New Zealand

The Southern Hemisphere has significantly less polluted air than the Northern Hemisphere. This is because most of earth's population and major industrial powers reside in the Northern Hemisphere, including high-emission countries like China and India. The Southern Hemisphere was unimpacted by the 1986 Chernobyl nuclear disaster, which at the time posed a serious threat to the Northern Hemisphere, and which continues to impact certain parts of Europe. Small traces of radiation from the disaster were found in far off Northern Hemisphere locations like the United States, Canada and Japan, but there were no traces of radiation at all in the Southern Hemisphere.

=== Flora and Fauna ===
Forests in the Southern Hemisphere have special features which set them apart from those in the Northern Hemisphere. Both Chile and Australia share, for example, unique beech species or Nothofagus, and New Zealand has members of the closely related genera Lophozonia and Fuscospora. The eucalyptus is native to Australia but is now also planted in Southern Africa and Latin America for pulp production, and increasingly, biofuel uses.

Some African animals like chimpanzees and gorillas live in both the Northern and Southern Hemisphere portions of Africa. Eastern gorillas are native to three Southern Hemisphere countries; Rwanda (which is entirely below the equator) and the Democratic Republic of the Congo and Uganda (which are trans-hemispheric countries). Western gorillas, meanwhile, can be found in Angola, the Democratic Republic of the Congo, Equatorial Guinea, Gabon and the Republic of the Congo, in addition to being found in the Northern Hemisphere countries Cameroon and Nigeria. The different species of chimpanzees have a much wider distribution across Africa. The common chimpanzee occurs in both hemispheres, ranging from the Northern Hemisphere countries of Guinea and Senegal in the west to Tanzania and Uganda in the east. Aside from the population in Tanzania and Uganda, populations in several countries lay partly or wholly south of the equator, including in Burundi, the Democratic Republic of the Congo, Gabon and Republic of the Congo. The bonobo, which is a distinct species from the common chimpanzee, is exclusive to the Southern Hemisphere. It is endemic to forests of the Democratic Republic of the Congo south of the Congo River. Conversely, the western chimpanzee subspecies of the common chimpanzee is confined to West Africa and the Northern Hemisphere. Its present range lies entirely north of the equator, including Ghana, Guinea, Guinea-Bissau, Ivory Coast, Liberia, Mali, Senegal and Sierra Leone.

Giraffes occur predominantly in the Southern Hemisphere, with substantial populations in countries such as Botswana, Namibia, South Africa, Tanzania, Zambia, and Zimbabwe, although some populations also extend into the Northern Hemisphere, including parts of Kenya (which straddles the equator), Ethiopia and South Sudan. Zebras show a similar pattern: the plains zebra occurs in certain areas of the Horn of Africa in the Northern Hemisphere, and southward to Kenya, Tanzania, Zambia, Malawi, Mozambique and much of far southern Africa. When compared to the plains zebra, the mountain zebra and Grévy's zebra species have more geographically restricted distributions. Plains zebras used to occur in the far southern African country of Lesotho, but have since gone extinct there, in addition to going extinct in the Southern Hemisphere country Burundi, which is much further north of Lesotho.

The spectacled bear is the only bear species which occurs in the Southern Hemisphere. It is found in certain South American countries like Bolivia, Ecuador and Peru. One of the most notable animals to be found almost exclusively in the Southern Hemisphere is the penguin. A species is found around Isabela Island on Ecuador's Galápagos archipelago in the Pacific Ocean, which straddles the equator. However, most of Isabela and the rest of the archipelago is located in the Southern Hemisphere, and it is deemed by the International Hydrographic Organization as being wholly within the South Pacific Ocean, rather than the North Pacific.

Australia and Madagascar developed many endemic animals due to their geological isolation, including kangaroos, koalas, platypuses, Tasmanian devils, emus, echidnas, quokkas, cassowaries, lemurs, aye-ayes, fossas, indris, sifakas and panther chameleons. These animals are all native to the Southern Hemisphere, by virtue of being endemic to Australia or Madagascar, with cassowaries and echidnas being found not only in Australia but also in neighboring New Guinea. Dodos were endemic to the formerly uninhabited island of Mauritius, which is located in the Indian Ocean and Southern Hemisphere. The animal went extinct in 1681, 170 years after the first documented human landing on the island. The Galápagos Islands, Chile's Juan Fernández Islands and Australia's Christmas Island and Lord Howe Island are also known for endemism in their ecosystems, with Robinson Crusoe Island on the Juan Fernández Islands having the highest rate of endemic plants in the world. Several domestic dog breeds were developed in the Southern Hemisphere, including Australian cattle dogs, Australian kelpies, Australian silky terriers, Australian terriers, Bardino Majoreros, Brazilian terriers, Bull Arabs, Chilean terriers, Cimarrón Uruguayos, Cordoba fighting dogs, Dogo Argentinos, Fila Brasileiros, Pampas deerhounds, Peruvian Inca orchids and Tenterfield terriers. The Dogo Argentino and Fila Brasileiro are among the most widely banned dog breeds in the world, along with the Japanese Tosa Inu. The New Guinea singing dog naturally occurs on the island of New Guinea, rather than being an intentionally developed breed.

33 kilometers from Brazil's Atlantic coast lies Ilha da Queimada Grande, an island commonly known as "Snake Island" due to its large population of venomous snakes. The island is the only known natural habitat of the golden lancehead, a highly venomous species of pit viper. Earlier popular estimates claimed hundreds of thousands of snakes, but systematic studies have produced much lower estimates, with several thousand golden lancehead inhabiting the island. The unusually high concentration is thought to have developed after the island became separated from the mainland, leaving the snake population isolated while providing a relatively predator-poor environment and a seasonal supply of migratory birds; adult golden lanceheads feed primarily on birds, particularly the Chilean elaenia and yellow-legged thrush.

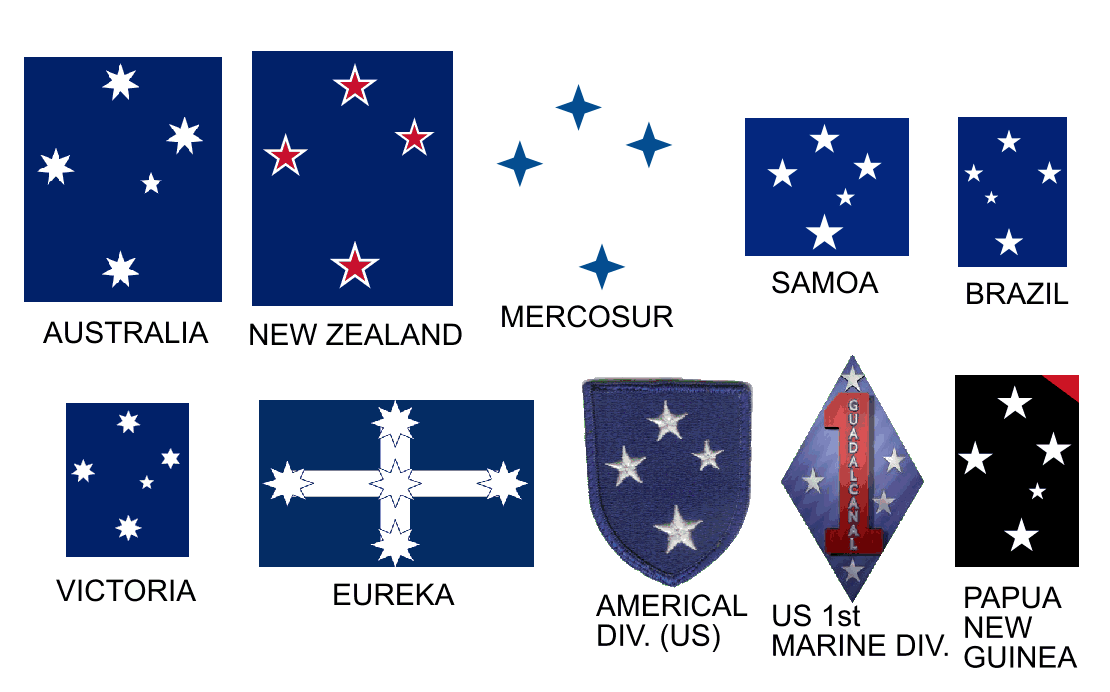
The Southern Cross (Crux) is a small, distinctive constellation visible predominantly from the skies of the Southern Hemisphere. It is featured on the flags and emblems of several Southern Hemisphere nations, including on the national flags of Australia, Brazil, New Zealand, Papua New Guinea and Samoa. It is also featured on other flags such as the flag for the South American trade bloc Mercosur.

== Geography ==
There are 48 independent countries fully or partially in the Southern Hemisphere. The number does not take into account France, Norway, the United Kingdom and the United States, which only have land in the Southern Hemisphere via distant territories and not through their mainlands. 34 of these countries are entirely below the equator. The two northernmost points for countries which have land in both the Northern and Southern Hemispheres are Colombia's Punta Gallinas (12°27′N 71°39′W) and Somalia's Alula Lagoon (11°59′N 50°47′E). The largest country in the Southern Hemisphere is Brazil and the smallest is Nauru. 34 of the 48 countries are also situated in the Eastern Hemisphere; Angola, Australia, Botswana, Burundi, Comoros, the Democratic Republic of the Congo, Equatorial Guinea, Eswatini, Gabon, Indonesia, Kenya, Lesotho, Madagascar, Malawi, Maldives, Mauritius, Mozambique, Namibia, Nauru, Papua New Guinea, Republic of the Congo, Rwanda, São Tomé and Príncipe, Seychelles, Solomon Islands, Somalia, South Africa, Tanzania, Timor-Leste, Tuvalu, Uganda, Vanuatu, Zambia and Zimbabwe. 11 of the 48 countries are also situated in the Western Hemisphere; Argentina, Bolivia, Brazil, Chile, Colombia, Ecuador, Paraguay, Peru, Samoa, Tonga, and Uruguay. Fiji, Kiribati and New Zealand have land in both the Eastern and Western Hemisphere, but are mostly in the Eastern Hemisphere. Kiribati is also one of the 14 countries straddling the equator, making it the only country in the world with land in all four hemispheres (excluding countries with offshore territories). Over half of Kiribati's population live on the capital South Tarawa. which is in the Eastern Hemisphere and Northern Hemisphere, and the country's default geographical coordinates are 1°25′N 173°00′E, per the centroid of the country. Eswatini, Lesotho, New Zealand and Uruguay are the only Southern Hemisphere countries which are entirely outside of the tropical climate zone, as they are all below the 23°26′S latitude. Argentina, Chile and South Africa are mostly outside of the tropical climate zone, although small portions of their land reaches into the tropics.

16 of the 48 countries in the Southern Hemisphere have no land borders to other countries; Australia, Comoros, Fiji, Kiribati, Madagascar, Maldives, Mauritius, Nauru, New Zealand, Samoa, São Tomé and Príncipe, Seychelles, Solomon Islands, Tonga, Tuvalu and Vanuatu. Indonesia, Papua New Guinea and Timor-Leste are considered divided island countries due to having land borders. 11 Southern Hemisphere countries border the South Atlantic Ocean; Angola, Argentina, Brazil, the Democratic Republic of the Congo, Equatorial Guinea, Gabon, Namibia, Republic of the Congo, São Tomé and Príncipe, South Africa and Uruguay. Colombia's Atlantic coast is technically above the equator, and facing the Caribbean Sea rather than the open Atlantic. They are the only country with land in the Southern Hemisphere which borders the Caribbean. 13 Southern Hemisphere countries border the Indian Ocean; Australia, Comoros, Indonesia, Kenya, Madagascar, Maldives, Mauritius, Mozambique, Seychelles, Somalia, South Africa, Timor-Leste and Tanzania. Since Colombia's Pacific coast is above the equator, there are 16 rather than 17 Southern Hemisphere countries bordering the South Pacific Ocean; Australia, Chile, Ecuador, Fiji, Indonesia, Kiribati, Nauru, New Zealand, Papua New Guinea, Peru, Samoa, Solomon Islands, Timor-Leste, Tonga, Tuvalu and Vanuatu. Bolivia formerly had access to the South Pacific Ocean, but lost it to Chile during the War of the Pacific in 1879–1884. The landlocked Bolivia still maintains a naval force that trains on Lake Titicaca and major rivers, as a symbol of hope to one day regain sovereign access to the sea. Despite having no Pacific coast, the country was featured in Michael Palin's 1997 series Full Circle, where he visited most of the countries on the Pacific Rim.

Aside from Nauru and Kiribati, the countries of the Micronesia region (Federated States of Micronesia, Marshall Islands and Palau) are all entirely above the equator. However, these three North Pacific island nations are sometimes included under the umbrella term "South Pacific", due to their cultural and ecological similarities to the islands of the South Pacific. Micronesia's Guam and Northern Mariana Islands are overseas territories of the United States, and are similarly associated with the South Pacific despite being located in the North Pacific. The Polynesian U.S. state of Hawaii is also sometimes associated with the South Pacific label, although it is even further north than the Micronesia region. In 1999, the South Pacific Forum (a regional bloc with Australia, New Zealand and countries in Melanesia, Micronesia and Polynesia) changed its name to the "Pacific Islands Forum", to reflect the fact that most Micronesian islands are in the North Pacific rather than the South Pacific. When the organization first formed in 1971, nearly all modern day Micronesian countries were still colonies of other countries.

For geopolitical purposes, many Northern Hemisphere countries are increasingly included in a "Global South" category, to illustrate how countries south of areas like Japan, Europe and North America are less developed, with those regions being referred to as the "Global North" in this context. The "Global South" category sometimes includes countries as far north as Mongolia, while generally excluding Australia and New Zealand on account of them being developed, even though they are two of the southernmost countries on earth.

=== Oceanography ===
==== South Pacific ====
Most of the South Pacific's islands are divided into the broad ethnographical regions of Melanesia and Polynesia, with the larger island of New Guinea typically being included in Melanesia and New Zealand occasionally in Polynesia. Melanesia includes Fiji, New Caledonia, Solomon Islands and Vanuatu, while Polynesia extends across the central and eastern Pacific and includes areas such as American Samoa, Cook Islands, Easter Island, French Polynesia, Niue, Samoa, Tokelau, Tonga, Tuvalu and Wallis and Futuna. Australia's east coast and parts of its northern coast are also situated in South Pacific seas, and this is where the Great Barrier Reef and most of its major cities lay. The volcanic Australian islands of Lord Howe Island and Norfolk Island are ecologically similar to tropical South Pacific islands, despite not culturally being considered part of the Melanesia and Polynesia regions. Norfolk Island, while primarily inhabited by Caucasian Australians, has evidence of prehistoric Polynesian activity from before Europeans discovered the island, as does the United Kingdom's overseas territory the Pitcairn Islands. Additionally, there are certain isolated islands closer to South America, like the Desventuradas Islands, Galápagos Islands and Juan Fernández Islands, which were discovered uninhabited by Europeans and which have no links to Melanesia and Polynesia. However, these are still geologically volcanic/oceanic islands. Some of Indonesia's islands are situated entirely in South Pacific seas, others are situated in the Indian Ocean and some border both ocean systems. Despite this, Indonesia is typically grouped with Southeast Asia rather than with the rest of the South Pacific. Timor-Leste also borders both ocean systems, and is more frequently grouped with the South Pacific than Indonesia is, but is still often regarded as Southeast Asian. Since 1945, the United Nations has categorized Australia, New Zealand, Melanesia, Polynesia and the North Pacific Micronesian islands as part of the continental designation of Oceania, with the term Oceania having been in usage as a descriptor for these areas since the early 19th century. Most sporting organizations like the Olympics also use this designation, and it is taught as a distinct continent in Latin America and parts of Europe. For statistical purposes, a geoscheme was created by the United Nations in 1970, which standardized the categorization of countries across the continental designations of Africa, America, Asia, Europe and Oceania. The geoscheme definition of Oceania does not include Indonesia or Timor-Leste, which are categorized as part of Asia. This definition also does not include Hawaii or any other North Pacific islands besides the Micronesian ones, in addition to not including the Chilean-administered Easter Island and other South Pacific islands adjacent to South America.

The Northern Hemisphere Pacific contains a greater concentration of high-latitude and subarctic islands, including Alaska's Aleutian Islands and several Bering Sea island groups, as well as Russia's Kuril Islands. The Southern Hemisphere has relatively few Pacific islands at comparable latitudes. One of its most notable subantarctic islands is Macquarie Island, an Australian island at about 54°63′S between Tasmania and Antarctica. Macquarie lies north of 60°S and is therefore north of the 60-degree boundary used in the 2002 International Hydrographic Organization definition of the Southern Ocean, although the status of that boundary remains disputed and the 2002 definition has not been universally adopted. Along the southern Chilean coast, there are non-oceanic islands at similar latitudes, such as the Diego Ramírez Islands, Madre de Dios Island and Tierra del Fuego (which is split with Argentina).

==== Southern Indian Ocean ====
Along with Madagascar and the west coast of Australia, the southern Indian Ocean also has various smaller volcanic/oceanic landmasses. These include the independent island countries of Comoros, the Maldives, Mauritius and Seychelles, as well as territories such as the British Indian Ocean Territory, Cocos (Keeling) Islands, Christmas Island and Heard Island and McDonald Islands, and France's Kerguelen Islands and Réunion. The British Indian Territory and Cocos (Keeling) Islands are oceanic islands which are low-lying coral atolls rather than volcanic islands, although they formed on the summits of ancient submarine volcanic structures, while the wider Indian Ocean contains numerous volcanic seamounts and island chains formed by volcanic activity. Heard Island is especially notable because it contains Mawson Peak, an active volcano that forms part of the Big Ben volcanic complex, and the Heard Island and McDonald Islands are described by the Australian Government as home to Australia's only active volcanoes. The Heard Island and McDonald Islands lie at about 53°S, while the Kerguelen Islands are farther north-west at roughly 49°S. Both are therefore north of 60°S and not part of the Southern Ocean under the IHO's 2002 definition. Even though they are outside the Southern Ocean proper, they are commonly described as subantarctic and are strongly influenced by the Southern Ocean and the Antarctic Circumpolar Current.

==== South Atlantic ====
The Atlantic Ocean has several extremely isolated islands in the Southern Hemisphere. By comparison, the North Atlantic has few isolated islands outside of Bermuda and the Azores, which themselves are less remote than the South Atlantic islands. Aside from the non-oceanic Falkland Islands, the South Atlantic includes islands like Ascension Island, Saint Helena, South Georgia and the South Sandwich Islands, and Tristan da Cunha. Many of these are British Overseas Territories: Saint Helena, Ascension and Tristan da Cunha form one British territory, while the Falklands and South Georgia and the South Sandwich Islands are separate British Overseas Territories. Tristan da Cunha is generally regarded as the most remote inhabited island on earth. Brazil's uninhabited Trindade and Martim Vaz lie 1,100 kilometers from the Brazilian mainland, and are among the most remote South Atlantic islands administered by a non-European nation. At the far southern edge of the Atlantic lies the Norwegian dependency of Bouvet Island, a volcanic island largely covered by glaciers. It is highly isolated from any other landmasses, and close to the boundary of the Atlantic Ocean, Indian Ocean and Southern Ocean. Bouvet Island is often labelled as the most remote island on earth, and was used as a setting in the 2004 film Alien vs. Predator, due to its extreme geography. The United Nations geoscheme officially categorizes the island as part of South America, although it is closer to Antarctica and Africa.

=== Geology ===
Among Southern Hemisphere countries, Australia, Fiji, Indonesia, Maldives, New Zealand, Papua New Guinea, Solomon Islands, Timor-Leste and Vanuatu are fully or partially on the Indo-Australian Plate, with Fiji, New Zealand, Solomon Islands, and Vanuatu also lying across boundaries with the Pacific Plate and smaller plates. Indonesia and Papua New Guinea occupy one of the most geologically complex regions on earth, being situated on the boundaries of the Indo-Australian Plate, Pacific Plate, Banda Sea Plate, Bird's Head Plate, Caroline Plate, Eurasian Plate, Maoke Plate, Philippine Sea Plate, Sunda Plate and Woodlark Plate, among other smaller plates and microplates. The Indo-Australian Plate encompasses several semi-autonomous entities and overseas territories, including the British Indian Ocean Territory, New Caledonia and Australia's Christmas Island, Cocos (Keeling) Islands, Lord Howe Island and Norfolk Island. Aside from the British Indian Ocean Territory and the Maldives, the Indo-Australian Plate's Indian component also contains the Northern Hemisphere countries India, Bangladesh, Bhutan, Pakistan and Sri Lanka, with the Indo-Australian Plate undergoing broad internal deformation and relative motion between its Indian and Australian components. Heard Island and McDonald Islands and the Kerguelen Islands lie on the Antarctic Plate as the main exposed peaks of the mostly submerged Kerguelen Plateau. The Antarctic Plate also includes Bouvet Island. The Pacific Plate extends deep into the Northern Hemisphere, and includes parts of the mainland Americas such as Los Angeles, San Diego and Mexico's Baja California Peninsula, but it is principally associated with smaller islands in the Southern Hemisphere, including American Samoa, Cook Islands, French Polynesia, Kiribati, Nauru, Niue, Pitcairn Islands, Samoa, Tokelau, Tuvalu and Wallis and Futuna. Macquarie Island lies on the boundary of the Indo-Australian Plate and Pacific Plate, while Tonga lies on the boundary of the Pacific Plate and Tonga Plate. The South American Plate does not include various South Pacific islands which were politically integrated into South America, but the plate is associated with Ascension Island, the Falklands Islands, Trindade and Martim Vaz and Brazil's Fernando de Noronha, with the Falkland Islands being situated in the Falkland Plateau tectonic boundary region. The Nazca Plate is a major plate off the Pacific coast of South America and includes Chile's Desventuradas Islands, Easter Island, Juan Fernández Islands and Salas y Gómez Island, as well as the Galápagos Islands. The largest landmass on the Nazca Plate is Isabela Island in the Galápagos Islands. The Nazca Plate is adjacent to active regional structures including the Easter Microplate and Galápagos Microplate. The South Sandwich Islands lie on the South Sandwich Plate near the larger Scotia Plate, while South Georgia lies within the complex Scotia–South American tectonic boundary region. Several countries and islands associated with Africa lie fully or partially on the Somali Plate, including Comoros, Kenya, Madagascar, Mauritius, Mayotte, Mozambique, Réunion, Seychelles, Somalia and Tanzania. The African Plate encompasses a large portion of the South Atlantic, including Saint Helena and Tristan da Cunha, which are thousands of kilometers from mainland Africa.

== Demographics, economy and human geography ==
=== Population ===
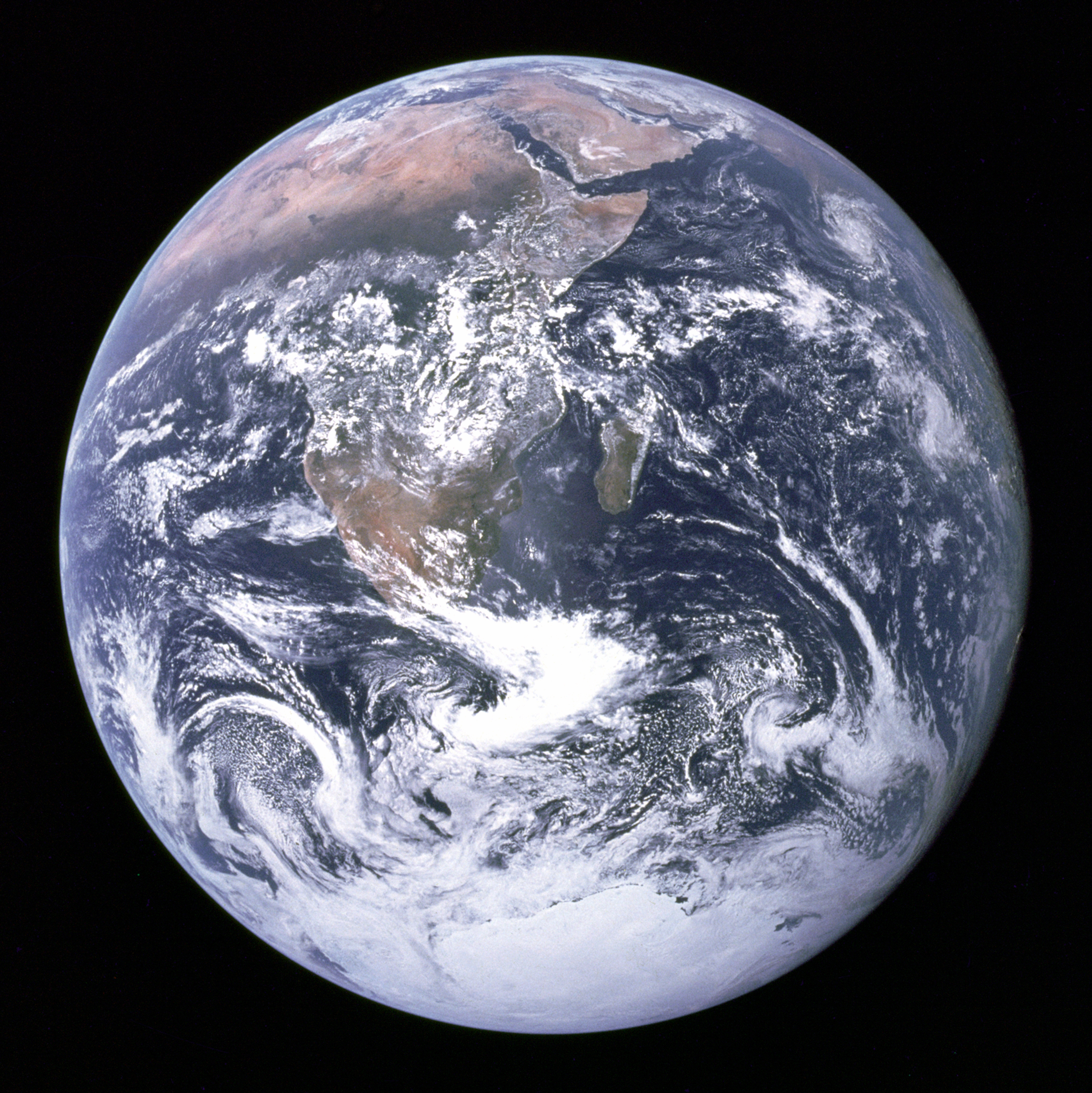
A photo of Earth from Apollo 17 (Blue Marble) with the South Pole at the top and the continent of Africa

More than 850 million people live in the Southern Hemisphere, representing around 10–12% of the total global human population. Of those 850 million people, more than 203 million live in Brazil. Approximately 93% of Brazil is below the equator, and over 95% of the total population also live below the equator. More than 150 million live in Indonesia's Java, the most populous island in the world and one which is situated entirely below the equator. The most populous country in the Southern Hemisphere is Indonesia, with 275 million people. Roughly 30 million Indonesians live north of the equator on the northern portions of the islands of Sumatra, Borneo, and Sulawesi, as well as most of North Maluku. The rest of the population lives in the Southern Hemisphere, making Indonesia the country with the most inhabitants in the Southern Hemisphere. The most populous country entirely located within the Southern Hemisphere is Tanzania, with an estimated population of roughly 67 million people as of 2024. In terms of size, Colombia is the ninth largest overall country with any land in the Southern Hemisphere, and has a population of 53 million, although much of Colombia is above the equator. The portion of Colombia below the equator is the same size as some European countries, and makes up the Amazonas Department. Colombia's most populated settlement in the Southern Hemisphere is the Amazonas Department capital city Leticia, with other Southern Hemisphere settlements being El Encanto, La Chorrera, La Pedrera, Mirití-Paraná, Puerto Alegría, Puerto Arica, Puerto Nariño, Puerto Santander and Tarapacá. Somalia has a population of 20 million, and the vast majority of the country is above the equator. Somalia's biggest settlement in the Southern Hemisphere is Kismayo, which had a population of 458,000 in 2014. The Northern and Southern Hemisphere portions of Kenya are similar in size to each other, but the country's population is concentrated in the Southern Hemisphere, with the three most populated cities Nairobi, Mombasa and Nakuru being below the equator.

In 2026, the states with the highest population density in the Southern Hemisphere were Mauritius and Nauru, which respectively had 618 people and 595 people per square kilometer. Maldives had a higher population density than Mauritius and Nauru, with 1,945 people per kilometer, however, most of its population lives above the equator, with only a small portion of the country being in the Southern Hemisphere. In 2026, the least densely populated states in the Southern Hemisphere were Namibia and Australia, which had 4 people and 3 people per square kilometer. In 2026, Australia also ranked as the second least densely populated state in the Eastern Hemisphere, behind only Mongolia. Over 87% of Australia's population live within just 50 kilometers of coastal areas. Australia's Indian Ocean west coast is much more sparsely populated than its Pacific east coast, with Perth being the only major city on the west coast. Like Australia's Indian Ocean coast, Namibia's Atlantic coast is also very sparsely populated. Four countries or territories in the Southern Hemisphere currently have no permanent human population; Bouvet Island, French Southern and Antarctic Lands (which includes the Kerguelen Islands), Heard Island and McDonald Islands and South Georgia and the South Sandwich Islands. These territories have their own internet country codes and domain names, despite the lack of human activity.

Among the largest metropolitan areas in the Southern Hemisphere are Jakarta (33 million people), São Paulo (22 million), Kinshasa-Brazzaville (19 million), Buenos Aires (16 million), Rio de Janeiro (12 million), Lima (11 million), Surabaya (10 million), Luanda, Bandung (9 million each), Dar es Salaam, Santiago (7 million each), Johannesburg, Semarang, Belo Horizonte (6 million each), Sydney, Melbourne and Cape Town (5 million each). Melbourne is the southernmost city in the world with a population exceeding one million.

=== Language ===
Portuguese is one of the most spoken languages in the Southern Hemisphere, with over 230 million speakers in six countries – mostly in Brazil, but also in Angola, Mozambique, Timor-Leste, and small parts of São Tomé and Príncipe that lie south of the equator. Spanish is the primary language in Argentina, Bolivia, Chile, Colombia, Ecuador, Equatorial Guinea, Paraguay, Peru and Uruguay. French is an official language in Gabon, French Polynesia, Mayotte, New Caledonia, Réunion and Wallis and Futuna, but is not necessarily the most widely spoken language in all of these locations. English is a primary language in Ascension Island, Australia, the British Indian Ocean Territory, the Falkland Islands, New Zealand, Norfolk Island, Saint Helena, Tristan da Cunha, Tuvalu and Uganda. English and Tuvaluan (a Polynesian language) are the official joint languages of Tuvalu, while Luganda is the most widely spoken language in Uganda, despite the official administrative language being English. Most of the other countries and states in the Southern Hemisphere have primary languages which are their own local languages rather than colonial languages. English is widely understood in South Africa, but the country has 12 official languages recognized by its national constitution, with Zulu being the most widely spoken. Some authors use the term "Southern Hemisphere English" to describe similarities between the English spoken in areas such as Australia, the Falkland Islands, New Zealand and South Africa. Outside of English and languages from immigrant communities, Australia also has more than 250 Indigenous languages, including 800 dialects. Each language is specific to a particular place and people. Australia itself has no official language, even though English is the most widely spoken.

On the Pitcairn Islands in the South Pacific, English is spoken alongside a Polynesian-influenced dialect called Pitkern. Native Polynesian or Melanesian languages are most common on the majority of South Pacific islands, with the colonial language of English also typically being understood. Kiribati and Nauru are the only countries or territories in the South Pacific which speak languages related to the Micronesian language family. All others are located entirely in the North Pacific, although Kiribati itself has various islands in the North Pacific, since the country straddles the equator. The only oceanic South Pacific islands which speak Spanish are Ecuador's Galápagos Islands and Chile's Juan Fernández Islands and Easter Island. Residents of Easter Island also still speak a native Polynesian language which developed before the island became part of Chile in 1888. Spanish is not spoken on Chile's oceanic Desventuradas Islands and Salas y Gómez Island, as these islands are uninhabited by civilians. The island of New Guinea is estimated to have around 7,000 living languages. New Guinea, which is split between Indonesia and Papua New Guinea, makes up roughly 10% of the world's languages, despite having less than 0.1% of the world's population.

Comoros is the only Arabic-speaking country entirely in the Southern Hemisphere. Somalis speak both Arabic and Somali. The two countries are members of the Arab League. Comoros is also the only Arabic-speaking country which is a borderless island country; Bahrain is naturally an island but is connected to Saudi Arabia through man-made infrastructure, whilst the people of Malta speak their own distinct language which is related to Arabic.

=== Business and media ===
Important financial and commercial centers in the Southern Hemisphere include São Paulo, where the B3 (stock exchange) is headquartered, along with Sydney, home to the Australian Securities Exchange, Jakarta, the seat of the Indonesia Stock Exchange, Johannesburg, home to the Johannesburg Stock Exchange, and Buenos Aires, headquarters of the Buenos Aires Stock Exchange, the oldest stock market in the Southern Hemisphere. Elon Musk was born in the Southern Hemisphere in Pretoria, South Africa, and currently has the highest personal net worth in the world. He left South Africa as a teenager, moving to Canada in 1988 and later to the United States, where he built his fortune through ventures including Zip2, PayPal, Tesla, Inc., and SpaceX. News Corporation, founded by Melbourne-born Rupert Murdoch, was formerly one of the largest media companies in the world, owning the Hollywood studio 20th Century Fox and various newspapers, book publishers, television networks and sports teams across the globe. It reincorporated itself from an Australian company to an American company in 2004, and was delisted from the Australian stock exchange that same year. The 20th Century Fox film Avatar (2009) is the highest-grossing film of all time, with a box office return of $2,923,710,708. and was jointly shot in California, Hawaii and New Zealand. The film's director James Cameron has lived in New Zealand since 2012, and has said that the indigenous Polynesian cultures of areas like New Zealand partially inspired the alien world of the film. The highest-grossing film shot entirely in the Southern Hemisphere is the 2003 New Line Cinema film The Lord of the Rings: The Return of the King, which grossed $1,147,997,407 and was shot in New Zealand.

Television began relatively early in several of the more economically developed Southern Hemisphere countries. Brazil became the second country in Latin America to have regular television broadcasts when TV Tupi began broadcasting in São Paulo on September 18, 1950. (Note: The first television station in Mexico began regular broadcasts on September 1, 1950, after months of sporadic tests. See the XHTV article.) Argentina followed in 1951, when Canal 7 began regular broadcasting in Buenos Aires on October 17, making it one of the earliest television countries in the Americas. Australia introduced television in September 1956, with TCN in Sydney making the country's first regular television transmission on September 16, followed by other stations including HSV-7 in Melbourne and the ABC. Chile also developed television during the 1950s: the Pontifical Catholic University of Valparaíso conducted the country's first wireless television transmission on October 5, 1957, while university television services were established publicly during the following years. New Zealand began regular television broadcasting on June 1, 1960, initially from Auckland. Indonesia began its national television era with TVRI on August 24, 1962, initially broadcasting coverage of the 1962 Asian Games.

The spread of television was generally slower in poorer or more remote Southern Hemisphere areas. However, South Africa, despite being the most industrialized country in Africa at the time, did not begin nationwide television broadcasting until January 1976. This is because the government had delayed the introduction of the medium for years; experimental broadcasts only began in 1975. The comparatively late adoption of television in South Africa contrasted with the earlier arrival of television in a number of poorer African territories. In smaller Pacific islands, the high cost of transmitters, imported equipment and national distribution networks, combined with small populations and geographic isolation, heavily delayed the development of television services. Fiji, for example, began experimental television broadcasting in 1991 and regular service in 1994. In the Galápagos Islands, television broadcasting began in 1980 with Tele Galápagos in Puerto Baquerizo Moreno, around two decades after commercial television had begun on mainland Ecuador; it initially had only a low-power transmitter and limited local coverage. On Easter Island, Televisión Nacional de Chile established a television station at Hanga Roa on January 24, 1975. Initially, programmes were prerecorded on the Chilean mainland and transported to the island, while live satellite transmission from Santiago began in 1996; additional terrestrial networks were introduced later.

Like in the Northern Hemisphere, television broadcasting subsequently became a major cultural industry throughout the Southern Hemisphere. Australia developed several large national networks, including the ABC, SBS, Seven Network, Nine Network and Network 10, while New Zealand's principal television broadcaster has been TVNZ. Brazil became home to Globo, one of the world's largest television networks, while Argentina developed major broadcasters including Telefe and El Trece. Chile developed networks including Chilevisión, Canal 13 and Mega, while South Africa developed the South African Broadcasting Corporation (SABC) alongside commercial broadcasters such as e.tv. Indonesia's major television market developed around broadcasters including TVRI, RCTI, SCTV and Indosiar. In the Southern Hemisphere, some networks have also had international corporate ownership. Until 2025, U.S. media conglomerate Paramount Global controlled Network 10 in Australia, Telefe in Argentina and Chilevisión in Chile, meaning that major free-to-air networks in three geographically distant Southern Hemisphere markets were for a period under common ownership.

=== Currency ===
The currencies of the Southern Hemisphere reflect a mixture of national monetary systems, regional currency unions, and countries that use another state's currency. Australia's Australian dollar (AUD) is also used as legal tender in Kiribati, Nauru and Tuvalu. New Zealand's dollar (NZD) is used by New Zealand and also by its Polynesian territories the Cook Islands, Niue and Tokelau, while the Pitcairn Islands also use it despite being a British territory. The United States dollar (USD) is the official currency of Ecuador, including its Galápagos Islands, and is also the official currency of Timor-Leste, where the Central Bank of Timor-Leste issues centavo coins equivalent in value to US cents. In Africa, Central African CFA franc (XAF) is shared by Equatorial Guinea, Gabon and the Republic of the Congo, while Comoros uses the separate Comorian franc; in southern Africa, South Africa's rand forms the basis of the Common Monetary Area, linking South Africa, Eswatini, Lesotho and Namibia, with Eswatini's lilangeni and Lesotho's loti pegged to the rand and Namibia's Namibian dollar maintained at parity with it. Most of the remaining Southern Hemisphere states issue national currencies, including the Argentine peso, Bolivian boliviano, Brazilian real, Chilean peso, Colombian peso, Paraguayan guaraní, Peruvian sol and Uruguayan peso in South America; the Angolan kwanza, Botswana pula, Burundian franc, Congolese franc, Kenyan shilling, Malagasy ariary, Malawian kwacha, Mauritian rupee, Mozambican metical, Rwandan franc, São Tomé and Príncipe dobra, Seychellois rupee, Somali shilling, Tanzanian shilling, Ugandan shilling, Zambian kwacha and Zimbabwe Gold in Africa; and the Indonesian rupiah, Maldivian rufiyaa, Fijian dollar, Papua New Guinean kina, Samoan tālā, Solomon Islands dollar, Tongan paʻanga and Vanuatu vatu in Asia and Oceania. Some non-independent Southern Hemisphere territories add several further currency systems: French Polynesia, New Caledonia and Wallis and Futuna all use the CFP franc (XPF), the common currency of France's Pacific collectivities, issued by the Institut d'émission d'outre-mer; American Samoa uses the US dollar, while French territories such as Réunion and Mayotte use the euro. Christmas Island, the Cocos (Keeling) Islands and Norfolk Island use the Australian dollar as they are Australian external territories. Easter Island uses the Chilean peso because it is part of Chile, rather than having a separate island currency.

=== Tourism ===
Popular tourist destinations in the Southern Hemisphere include Bali, Buenos Aires, Cape Town, Easter Island, Lima, Rio de Janeiro, Sydney and Tahiti. In 2016, Lima was the most visited city in the Southern Hemisphere, and the 32nd most visited city in the world. The other Southern Hemisphere cities in the top 100 that year were Sydney, Johannesburg, Melbourne, São Paulo, Buenos Aires, Jakarta, Rio de Janeiro, Cape Town, Montevideo, Durban and Quito. According to a 2017 report, the most popular Southern Hemisphere "bucket list" destinations among Australians were Antarctica, New Zealand, the Galápagos Islands, South Africa and Peru. Quito, Ecuador is the closest major city to the equatorial line on the planet, and Ushuaia, Argentina claims the title of world's southernmost city. Ushuaia's default geographical coordinates are 54°48′S 68°18′W. Cape Town, Christchurch, Hobart, Punta Arenas and Ushuaia are officially acknowledged as the five international Antarctic gateway cities that serve as primary entry points for travel to the Antarctic region.

Tourism among Australians is concentrated in nearby countries bordering the western Pacific. Popular overseas destinations for Australian travelers include Indonesia (particularly Bali), Fiji, Japan, New Zealand and Thailand, with Indonesia accounting for 14% of overseas trips by Australian residents in 2025–26. 2024 booking data from Flight Centre's Australian operations ranked Bali as its customers' most popular international destination. Outside of traditional tourism, destinations like Thailand and Malaysia are popular among Australian women seeking cheaper prices for cosmetic surgery procedures. North American regions bordering the Pacific are also popular tourism spots for Australians. In 2023, Australia was the third largest source of tourism for Canada's Pacific province British Columbia, behind only China and the United States. In 2011, Australia was additionally recorded as being the largest source of tourism for the U.S. Pacific state of Alaska. Among residents of other Southern Hemisphere countries, Brazil was ranked as one of the most popular destinations for Argentinians in 2025. Likewise, Argentina overtook the United States as the most popular international destination for Brazilians in the first seven months of 2025, a position it retained in 2026. For customers of Flight Centre's South African operations, the most popular destinations in 2023 were Mauritius, the United Arab Emirates (Dubai) and Thailand (Phuket).

=== Standard of living ===
Among the most developed nations in the Southern Hemisphere is Australia, with a nominal GDP per capita of US$63,487 and a Human Development Index (HDI) of 0.946, the tenth-highest in the world as of the 2024 report. New Zealand is also well developed, with a nominal GDP per capita of US$48,072 and an HDI of 0.939, putting it at number 16 in the world in 2024. The least developed nations in the Southern Hemisphere cluster in Africa and Oceania, with Mozambique and Burundi at the lowest ends of the HDI, at 0.461 (number 183 in the world) and 0.420 (number 187 in the world), respectively. The nominal GDPs per capita of these two countries do not go above US$650, a tiny fraction of the incomes enjoyed by Australians and New Zealanders. In 2025, the French overseas territory French Polynesia had the highest life expectancy for both males and females in the Southern Hemisphere (81.9 years for males and 86.6 years for females). French Polynesia also had the highest life expectancy for males and females in the Western Hemisphere, above countries such as the United States and Canada. In 2025, Africa's Lesotho had the lowest life expectancy for both males and females in the Southern Hemisphere (55.0 years for males and 60.4 years for females). The only countries with lower life expectancies for males and females in 2025 were the Northern Hemisphere African countries of the Central African Republic, Chad and Nigeria.

Nauru, which was under Australian administration between 1914 and 1968, had one of the highest GDP per capitas in the world during the 1970s and 1980s, due to its phosphate industry. It eventually suffered an economic collapse, following a decline in its phosphate and misguided financial decisions. Before the economic collapse, Nauru was earning 70 times more than its island neighbors were. During this time, Nauru's government spent money on a London West End musical and lost over a billion dollars on lavish property development projects in Australia, Hawaii and the Philippines. The Nauru House in Melbourne was briefly the city's tallest building, and had to be sold by the government of Nauru to pay off debts. Nauru currently receives income from Australia by hosting detained asylum seekers, and had the second lowest GDP in the world in 2025, behind only Tuvalu, which is also in the Southern Hemisphere. Tuvalu is increasingly affected by rising sea levels, which have encouraged some residents to consider migration out of the country. Under the 2023 Falepili Union, Australia established a pathway for Tuvaluan citizens to live, work, and study in Australia. In its first year, around two-thirds of Tuvalu's population applied for the visa, although places were initially limited. World Health Organization estimates for 2021 showed substantial variation in suicide mortality rates across Southern Hemisphere countries. Lesotho ranked as the country with the highest suicide rate in the world that year, ahead of South Korea in the Northern Hemisphere. Among Southern Hemisphere countries listed, Lesotho recorded an estimated 28.7 suicides per 100,000 population, followed by Eswatini at 27.2, Uruguay at 24.8 and South Africa at 22.3. Other countries recorded lower estimates, including Australia (13.1), Samoa (12.0), New Zealand (11.9), Mauritius (10.5), Namibia (8.6), Fiji (8.3), Angola (8.1), Argentina (7.9) and Brazil (7.6). São Tomé and Príncipe (0.9) had the lowest suicide rate for countries with land in the Southern Hemisphere, while Peru (1.5) had the lowest suicide rate for countries entirely in the Southern Hemisphere.

==== Consumer habits and household expenditure ====
In areas like Argentina and Brazil, cosmetic procedures represent a significant sector of the healthcare market. A ranking published in 2024 using 2021 estimates placed Argentina second worldwide for cosmetic procedures per capita, at approximately 8.81 procedures per 1,000 inhabitants, behind South Korea at 8.90 per 1,000 inhabitants. Brazil (7.62) and Colombia (7.26) placed third and fourth in this same ranking. The figures were based on national procedure estimates from the International Society of Aesthetic Plastic Surgery (ISAPS). A 2018 ISAPS global survey also placed Argentina, Australia, Brazil and Colombia as among the top ten countries for total number of cosmetic procedures. Argentina, Australia, Brazil and Colombia again ranked high for total number of cosmetic procedures in 2024, with Brazil recording the largest worldwide number of surgical procedures, and the United States recording the largest number of combined surgical and non-surgical procedures. Argentina, Australia, Brazil and Colombia were each recorded as having more surgical procedures than non-surgical procedures, unlike the United States, which skewed heavily towards non-surgical procedures. Australia recorded a combined 177,502 procedures with a population of 27 million, down from 202,642 in 2018 when it had a population of 25 million. By comparison, the United Kingdom only recorded 141,134 procedures in 2024, despite having a population of nearly 70 million. In 2008, Australia was reported to have surpassed the U.S. in terms of per capita spend on cosmetic procedures, with Australia spending $300 million on procedures that year. By 2018, Australia's annual spending for cosmetic procedures had ballooned to $1 billion, which was 40% more per capita than the United States, and in 2025 one in five Australian women were estimated to have had a cosmetic procedure throughout their life. In 2024, the most common non-surgical procedure in Argentina, Australia, Brazil and Colombia was botulinum toxin (botox), while liposuction was the most common surgical procedure in Brazil and Colombia, and breast implants were the most common surgical procedure in Argentina and Australia. In a 2006 article, The Guardian wrote about the popularity of the breast implant procedure among Argentine women, noting that Argentina imported more silicone implants for breasts per capita than any other country in the world. In 2024, buttock augmentation also ranked among the top five most common surgical procedures in Brazil and Colombia, although it was not among the top five in Argentina and Australia. Despite its name, the Brazilian butt lift (BBL) is not established as having originated in Brazil; the term was attributed to a New York surgeon in 1996. The procedure involves removing fat from areas such as the abdomen, flanks or thighs through liposuction, purifying it and injecting it into the buttocks to increase their volume and improve their shape. Among other Southern Hemisphere countries in 2024, the most common surgical procedure in Chile was liposuction, and in South Africa eyelid surgery.

According to Kirin Company's 2019 global beer consumption report, Brazil was the world's third-largest beer market by total volume, consuming 12.40 million kilolitres. Other Southern Hemisphere countries among the 25 largest national beer markets included South Africa (12th, 3.62 million kilolitres), Colombia (14th, 2.48 million), Australia (23rd, 1.89 million) and Argentina (25th, 1.74 million). In the report's per-capita ranking, Namibia placed sixth worldwide, at 95.5 litres per person annually, followed by Australia in 17th place (75.1 litres), Gabon in 25th (67.0 litres), New Zealand in 27th (61.0 litres), Brazil in 30th (58.4 litres) and the Republic of the Congo in 34th (54.8 litres). The Czech Republic led the per-capita ranking, while China was first in terms of total volume consumed. International comparisons of per-capita coffee consumption indicate that some of the highest-consuming countries are concentrated in the Arctic, such as Finland, Norway and Sweden. Among Southern Hemisphere countries in a 2013 ranking, Brazil placed tenth in coffee consumption, at 4.8 kg per person, followed by Australia at 28th (2.6 kg), Colombia at 44th (1.4 kg) and New Zealand at 47th (1.3 kg). A 2023 ranking on tea consumption placed New Zealand eighth worldwide and Chile ninth for per-capita tea consumption, both at approximately 1.19 kg per person annually. South Africa ranked fourteenth, at 0.80 kg, while Australia ranked sixteenth, at 0.75 kg. The highest ranked country in the entire study was Turkey.

According to Argentina's 2017–2018 National Household Expenditure Survey, food and non-alcoholic beverages accounted for 22.6% of household consumption expenditure, followed by housing and associated utilities at 14.5%, transport at 14.2%, and recreation and culture at 8.7%. In Brazil, the 2017–2018 Household Budget Survey found that food, housing and transport together accounted for 72.2% of household consumption expenditure. The proportions varied with household income: households earning up to two minimum wages allocated 22.0% of their total expenditure to food and 39.2% to housing, compared with 7.6% and 22.6%, respectively, among households earning more than 25 minimum wages. In South Africa, the 2022–2023 Income and Expenditure Survey estimated annual household consumption expenditure at approximately 3 trillion rand. Housing and utilities, food and non-alcoholic beverages, transport, and insurance and financial services together accounted for 75.6% of household consumption expenditure. Australian household spending surveys identify housing, food and transport as major components of household budgets. In the Australian Bureau of Statistics' 2015–2016 Household Expenditure Survey, average weekly household spending on goods and services was $1,425. This included approximately $279 for current housing costs, $237 for food and non-alcoholic beverages, $207 for transport and $172 for recreation. Housing accounted for approximately 20% of the total, food for 17%, transport for 15% and recreation for 12%. These figures describe spending in 2015–2016 and are not adjusted for inflation. Data from Statistics Indonesia's March 2024 National Socioeconomic Survey showed that food accounted for 50.1% of average monthly expenditure per capita nationally. The share was 46.61% in urban areas and 57.53% in rural areas. Prepared food and beverages represented 15.92% of expenditure nationally, while housing and household facilities accounted for 26.11%. Recreation and cultural activities account for a measurable share of expenditure in New Zealand. According to the Ministry for Culture and Heritage, recreation and culture represented 8.3% of household spending in 2023. Separately, consumers spent $3.85 billion on sport and active recreation-related goods and services in 2019, equivalent to 2.1% of total consumer expenditure.

==== Nominal GDP of Southern Hemisphere countries ====
Nominal GDP by country (2024)
Rank	Country	GDP (Nominal, USD)
1	Brazil*	$2.28 trillion
2	Australia*	$1.80 trillion
3	Indonesia*	$1.45 trillion
4	Argentina	$683.10 billion
5	Colombia*	$457.41 billion
6	South Africa	$427.18 billion
7	Chile*	$357.37 billion
8	Peru*	$334.86 billion
9	New Zealand	$264.06 billion
10	Kenya*	$135.94 billion
11	Ecuador*	$130.32 billion
12	Angola	$122.18 billion
13	Democratic Republic of the Congo	$91.03 billion
14	Tanzania	$90.14 billion
15	Uruguay	$85.35 billion
16	Bolivia*	$64.77 billion
17	Uganda	$61.99 billion
18	Zimbabwe	$51.22 billion
19	Paraguay	$49.28 billion
20	Papua New Guinea*	$32.50 billion
21	Zambia	$28.88 billion
22	Mozambique	$22.34 billion
23	Gabon	$21.43 billion
24	Botswana	$19.93 billion
25	Madagascar	$19.62 billion
26	Rwanda	$16.37 billion
27	Republic of the Congo	$16.31 billion
28	Mauritius	$16.16 billion
29	Namibia	$15.08 billion
30	Malawi	$14.92 billion
31	Somalia*	$13.00 billion
32	Equatorial Guinea	$12.82 billion
33	Maldives*	$7.74 billion
34	Fiji*	$6.20 billion
35	Eswatini	$5.16 billion
36	Burundi	$3.37 billion
37	Lesotho	$2.57 billion
38	Seychelles	$2.39 billion
39	Timor-Leste	$1.90 billion
40	Comoros	$1.82 billion
41	Solomon Islands	$1.75 billion
42	Vanuatu	$1.35 billion
43	Samoa	$1.29 billion
44	São Tomé and Príncipe*	$981 million
45	Tonga	$679 million
46	Kiribati	$349 million
47	Nauru	$176 million
48	Tuvalu	$57 million

*partly in the Northern hemisphere.

=== Sporting culture ===
Association football is generally the most popular sport across the Southern Hemisphere, particularly in South America, Indonesia and much of Southern Africa. It is the dominant spectator and participation sport in nearly all South American countries, while football has also become the most widely followed sport across much of Africa. South America is strongly associated with football, having produced numerous internationally successful national teams and clubs, although some South American countries retain additional sporting traditions that differ from the continental norm. Cricket is particularly prominent in Australia, New Zealand and South Africa, all of which have longstanding domestic competitions and internationally successful national teams; it is also followed extensively in other parts of the Southern Hemisphere, including Namibia and Zimbabwe. Rugby union has a similarly strong Southern Hemisphere presence, especially in Australia, New Zealand, South Africa and the islands of Melanesia and Polynesia. In the South Pacific, rugby union is the national sport of Fiji, New Zealand, Samoa and Tonga, and is among the region's most prominent sports. In South America, rugby union has a particularly strong following in Argentina and Uruguay, which have traditions considerably stronger than those found in most other South American countries; both are members of Sudamérica Rugby, the continental governing body for the sport.

Rugby league, which is a distinct sport from Rugby union, has a more geographically limited following. It is one of Australia's major football codes and has a strong presence in New South Wales and Queensland, while Papua New Guinea is notable for being the only country where rugby league is regarded as the national sport and enjoys exceptionally widespread popular support. Papua New Guinea is set to gain a club in Australia's top Rugby league competition the NRL in 2028. The NRL has additionally had a team from New Zealand competing since 1995, with Rugby league being significantly less popular in New Zealand than Rugby union. Australia is also the birthplace of Australian rules football, a code whose popularity is concentrated in Victoria, South Australia, Western Australia, Tasmania and the Northern Territory, including major urban centers such as Adelaide, Melbourne and Perth. It is comparatively less dominant in Sydney and Brisbane, where rugby league and other football codes have historically had stronger followings; this geographical division is associated with a concept known as the Barassi Line. Outside Australia, Nauru is particularly notable for the prominence of Australian rules football. The sport was introduced there during the period of Australian administration and became established as the island's national sport, making Nauru the only country outside Australia where Australian rules football is the most popular sport. Association football remains comparatively undeveloped in Nauru, and the country is one of the few sovereign states not affiliated with FIFA. FIFA currently has 211 member associations, and Nauru is absent from its membership list, along with some other Micronesian countries which lie above the equator, including the Federated States of Micronesia and the Marshall Islands. In 1995, Nauru invested one million dollars in the nearly bankrupt Fitzroy Lions, which competed in the AFL, Australia's top national league for Australian rules football. However, shortly afterwards there was a change in leadership in Nauru, and the new governors concluded that any projects in operation were to be halted, with audits into every single one of the island's offshore ventures to be conducted. Nauru's new governors were granted legal advice that it would be improper to continue propping up an insolvent business such as the Fitzroy Lions, and the club eventually had to merge with the Brisbane Bears, becoming the Brisbane Lions in 1997, after having been in the competition as Fitzroy since 1897.

Australia's national association football team the Socceroos used to compete in FIFA's Oceania Football Confederation, but switched to the Asian Football Confederation in 2006. This was partially due to a lack of competition from the smaller Pacific island teams in the OFC. In a 2001 OFC qualifying match for the FIFA World Cup, the Socceroos had a 31–0 win over American Samoa. The American Samoa game became the largest international victory in the history of the sport, breaking the record set in Australia's previous qualifying match, where they defeated Tonga 22–0. In the American Samoa game, Archie Thompson also broke the record for most goals in an international match, scoring 13. The subsequent trials and tribulations in American Samoan football were documented in the 2023 Searchlight Pictures film Next Goal Wins. The film was directed by New Zealander Taika Waititi.

Unlike Nauru and other Micronesian countries, Kiribati is currently an associate member of the Oceania Football Confederation. However, Kiribati is not a member of FIFA itself, and consequently cannot participate in FIFA competitions such as the FIFA World Cup. Tuvalu has the same status: both are currently the OFC's associate members and neither has FIFA membership. The Galápagos Islands have historically had no football association affiliated with the Ecuadorian Football Federation and consequently have not had a representative club in Ecuador's principal national league system. FIFA has nevertheless documented an organised local football scene on the islands, with neighbourhood leagues in Santa Cruz, San Cristóbal and Isabela. Among the islands, there is a provincial championship whose winner travels 1,000 kilometers to mainland Ecuador to represent Galápagos in the amateur national neighbourhood-league competition. Remote Chilean islands in the South Pacific have also developed unorthodox ways to represent themselves in football. Easter Island has long maintained its own national football team despite being part of Chile, while the Juan Fernández Islands have also developed a representative side. The Juan Fernández Islands are members of Conselho Sul-Americano de Novas Federações de Futebol, which is for teams that are not recognised by South America's CONMEBOL federation. They have played multiple matches against Easter Island, who are unconfirmed members of CONIFA, a similar organization for national teams not recognized by FIFA. The Easter Island team's first match in 1996 was a 5–3 away win against the Juan Fernández Islands at Robinson Crusoe Island; Easter Island have also played against the national team of the Falkland Islands, who likewise aren't recognized by FIFA.

=== Religion and human history ===
Before the Age of Discovery, most of the Southern Hemisphere was largely cut off from the cultural constructs of the Western and Eastern worlds. Some view the geopolitical concepts of the West and the East as being Northern Hemisphere-centric concepts. The most geographically widespread religion in the modern Southern Hemisphere is the colonial religion of Christianity, prevalent in South America, Africa, Oceania, and Timor-Leste. Islam is common in certain areas of East Africa as well as in Indonesia, Hinduism is mostly concentrated on/around the islands of Bali, Mauritius and Fiji. In the Southern Hemisphere, Orthodox Christianity is less common than Catholicism and other forms of Christianity such as Protestantism. It is concentrated among small Eastern European and Balkan immigrant communities in countries like Australia and Brazil. Large proportions of the population in Australia and New Zealand are increasingly not affiliated to any religion, with the majority of New Zealand's population currently classified as unaffiliated. This mirrors trends in other developed Asia-Pacific countries above the equator, such as China, Japan and South Korea, which also have large proportions of the population not affiliated to any religion. Religious unaffiliation is less common in Australia and New Zealand's Christian-majority South Pacific island neighbors. Most of the world's Jewish population is concentrated in the Northern Hemisphere countries of Israel and the United States. Southern Hemisphere countries which rank in the top 15 for global Jewish populations are Argentina (170,000), Australia (117,000), Brazil (90,030) and South Africa (49,500). Argentina, Australia, Brazil and South Africa collectively only make up 2.5% of the global Jewish population. The experiences of Jews in Southern Hemisphere countries like Argentina, Australia and South Africa are often collectively grouped together, since these locations are geographically isolated from the places where most of the global Jewish population reside. Additionally, various Jewish holidays are deeply connected to specific seasons of the Northern Hemisphere, which do not correlate with the seasons of the Southern Hemisphere.

The oldest continuously inhabited city in the Southern Hemisphere is Bogor, in western Java, which was founded in 669. Ancient texts from the Hindu kingdoms prevalent in the area definitively record 669 CE as the year when Bogor was founded. However, some evidence shows that Zanzibar, an ancient port with around 200,000 inhabitants off the coast of Tanzania, may be older than Bogor. A Greco-Roman text written between 1 and 100 CE, the Periplus of the Erythraean Sea, mentioned the island of Menuthias (Ancient Greek: Μενουθιάς) as a trading port on the east African coast, which is probably the small Tanzanian island of Unguja on which Zanzibar is located. The oldest monumental civilizations in the Southern Hemisphere are the Norte Chico civilization and Casma–Sechin culture from the northern coast of Peru. These civilizations built cities, pyramids, and plazas in the coastal river valleys of northern Peru with some ruins dating back to 3600 BCE. Easter Island, located about 3,500 km (2,200 mi) from Chile and French Polynesia, is considered to be the most remote place on Earth to have been permanently inhabited by humans before the Age of Discovery. It was settled by a Polynesian group known as the Rapa Nui.

Areas of the Southern Hemisphere that had no recorded human activity before the Age of Discovery include the British Indian Ocean Territory, Christmas Island, Cocos (Keeling) Islands, Heard Island and McDonald islands, the Kerguelen Islands, Mauritius and Seychelles (in the Indian Ocean), the Desventuradas Islands, the Galápagos Islands, Jarvis Island, the Juan Fernández Islands, Lord Howe Island and Macquarie Island (in the South Pacific), Annobón, Ascension Island, Bouvet Island, Fernando de Noronha, Saint Helena, South Georgia and the South Sandwich Islands, Trindade and Martim Vaz and Tristan da Cunha (in the South Atlantic) and Antarctica. Some of these locations eventually received human populations following European discovery, including Annobón, Ascension Island, the British Indian Ocean Territory, Cocos (Keeling) Islands, Christmas Island, Fernando de Noronha, the Galápagos Islands, the Juan Fernández Islands, Lord Howe Island, Mauritius, Saint Helena, Seychelles and Tristan da Cunha, while the other locations remain uninhabited by civilians. Mauritius and Seychelles became their own independent countries in 1968 and 1976, and are some of the only nation states in the world without true Indigenous populations. The Falkland Islands were found uninhabited by British mariner John Strong in 1690, although a 2021 study claimed indigenous South Americans may have visited the islands between 1275 and 1420, without ever having a long-term occupation. This study has not been acknowledged by the government of the Falkland Islands. Norfolk Island, the Pitcairn Islands and New Zealand's Auckland Islands were discovered uninhabited yet are generally accepted to have had Polynesian activity beforehand, as there is archeological evidence to support this.

==== Timeline of European exploration in the Southern Hemisphere ====
- 1470: São Tomé — Portuguese navigators, traditionally identified as João de Santarém and Pêro Escobar, reached São Tomé on December 21, which was Saint Thomas's Day. December 21, 1470 is the date cited by the government of São Tomé and Príncipe, although a date of December 21, 1471 has also been cited. Only a small part of the island of São Tomé is in the Southern Hemisphere, and the following year, the Portuguese reached the neighboring island Príncipe, which is entirely above the equator.
- 1473: Equatorial Guinea — Portuguese sailors reached the previously uninhabited island of Annobón on January 1, during the exploration of the Gulf of Guinea. Its name derives from the Portuguese Ano Bom ("good year"). The exact attribution of the navigator is disputed, although modern scholarly work commonly associates the discovery with Fernão do Pó. Annobón is the only part of Equatorial Guinea which is in the Southern Hemisphere, and the Portuguese had already reached Northern Hemisphere areas of Equatorial Guinea during the previous year.
- 1482: Democratic Republic of the Congo and Republic of the Congo — Diogo Cão reached the mouth of the Congo River in 1482, making this the earliest documented European contact with territory of the present-day Democratic Republic of the Congo and Republic of the Congo.
- 1482: Angola — After reaching the Congo River in 1482, Diogo Cão subsequently sailed south along the coast of present-day Angola.
- 1487–1488: Namibia — Bartolomeu Dias sailed along the southern African coast and landed in the vicinity of present-day Walvis Bay during his voyage of 1487–1488.
- 1488: South Africa — Bartolomeu Dias reached the southern African coast in 1488 and became the first European known to set foot on present-day South African territory, landing at Mossel Bay.
- 1498: Mozambique — Portuguese mariner Vasco da Gama reached the coast of Mozambique during his first voyage to India in 1498.
- 1498: Kenya — Vasco da Gama reached the East African coast in 1498 and visited Malindi, making this the earliest documented Portuguese contact with present-day Kenya.
- 1498: Tanzania — Vasco da Gama became the first European recorded to visit the Tanzanian coast when he reached Mombasa and Kilwa Kisiwani during his 1498 voyage.
- 1500: Brazil — Pedro Álvares Cabral reached the coast of present-day Brazil on April 22, with the fleet making landfall near what is now Porto Seguro in Bahia. Cabral's expedition formally took possession of the territory for Portugal, making this the earliest firmly documented European arrival in present-day Brazil.
- 1500: Madagascar — Diogo Dias sighted Madagascar on August 10 after being separated from Pedro Álvares Cabral's fleet and named it São Lourenço.
- 1501: (Saint Helena) Ascension Island — João da Nova was the first known human to discover Ascension Island in 1501, initially naming it Conception. Afonso de Albuquerque encountered it again in 1503 on Ascension Day, giving it the name by which it is now known.
- 1502: Seychelles — a Portuguese fleet under Vasco da Gama are the first verified humans to record the Seychelles region, during the fourth Portuguese India Armada. Thomé Lopes recorded the sighting of an elevated island on March 15, 1503, generally identified with Silhouette Island.
- 1502: Saint Helena — João da Nova is credited with being the first human to discover Saint Helena on May 21, during his return voyage from India, although the historical evidence for the precise discovery is disputed.
- 1502: (Brazil) Trindade and Martim Vaz — João da Nova was the first known human to discover the islands during his 1502 voyage to India; they were subsequently incorporated into Portuguese charts of the South Atlantic.
- 1502–1503: Maldives — Portuguese fleets reached the Maldives during the early sixteenth-century Portuguese expansion into the Indian Ocean.
- 1503: (Brazil) Fernando de Noronha — Amerigo Vespucci was the first known human to visit Fernando de Noronha on August 10, 1503, as part of the expedition commanded by Gonçalo Coelho.
- 1505: Comoros — Portuguese navigators first visited the Comoros archipelago in 1505 during voyages between East Africa and India.
- 1506: Tristan da Cunha — Tristão da Cunha is the first known human to sight the island in 1506, during a Portuguese voyage toward India; he was unable to land because of rough seas.
- 1511: Mauritius — the Portuguese sailor Domingo Fernandez Pereira is considered the first known human to land on Mauritius, around 1511.
- 1511–1515: Zimbabwe — the Portuguese traveler António Fernandes made journeys into the interior of the Mutapa state in approximately 1511–1515, becoming one of the first Europeans documented in territory of present-day Zimbabwe.
- 1512: British Indian Ocean Territory — Portuguese captain Pedro de Mascarenhas was the first known human to sight the Chagos Archipelago and its largest island in February 1512. Mascarenhas named it Ilha de Dom Garcia after Dom Garcia de Noronha, who was a financial backer of this specific voyage.
- 1512: Indonesia — Portuguese expeditions reached the Moluccas.
- 1515: Timor-Leste — the first Europeans to arrive were the Portuguese in 1515.
- 1516: Argentina — Juan Díaz de Solís reached the Río de la Plata in 1516, making his voyage the earliest documented European exploration of the territory of present-day Argentina.
- 1516: Uruguay — Juan Díaz de Solís reached the Río de la Plata and the coast of present-day Uruguay in 1516.
- 1520: Chile — Ferdinand Magellan passed through the Strait of Magellan.
- 1521: French Polynesia — Ferdinand Magellan's expedition sighted Puka-Puka in the Tuamotu Archipelago, generally regarded as the first recorded European encounter with the islands now comprising French Polynesia.
- 1521: Kiribati — Ferdinand Magellan's expedition sighted Flint Island in the Line Islands, making it the earliest European sighting of territory now belonging to Kiribati.
- 1524: Paraguay — Aleixo Garcia travelled west from the Atlantic coast with a large Guaraní force in 1524 and became the first European known to reach the territory of present-day Paraguay and the site of modern Asunción.
- 1524–1525: Bolivia — Aleixo Garcia and his Guaraní allies crossed the Gran Chaco, with Garcia becoming the first European to encounter the Inca Empire, reaching territory in the vicinity of present-day Bolivia.
- 1526: Ecuador — Spanish reconnaissance reached the coast.
- 1526–1527: (Papua New Guinea) New Guinea — Jorge de Meneses became the first European generally credited with reaching New Guinea when he was blown off course while travelling from Malacca toward the Moluccas. His exact landfall is uncertain and may have been in western New Guinea, now part of Indonesia.
- 1528: Peru — in April 1528, Francisco Pizarro and his small band of men reached the northern Peruvian coast near Tumbes, and encountered the Inca Empire. The local inhabitants welcomed the Spaniards warmly and they reported seeing a sophisticated stone city with an abundance of gold and silver decorations inside the homes of local chiefs.
- 1535: (Galápagos Province) Galápagos Islands — Tomás de Berlanga became the first known human to land on the islands. He was blown off course while sailing from Panama toward Peru and reached the Galápagos on March 10. When Berlanga and his men landed on the first island, they found an extremely dry, rocky and apparently uninhabited landscape. They searched desperately for fresh water but initially found none, instead encountering animals such as giant tortoises. Berlanga considered the land so barren and stony that little could be cultivated.
- 1540: (Chile) Chiloé Archipelago — Alonso de Camargo became the first Spaniard recorded to sight the coast of Chiloé while travelling toward Peru. Francisco de Ulloa subsequently explored the archipelago in 1553 and is often regarded as its first European explorer in the more substantial sense.
- 1541–1542: Colombia — Francisco de Orellana led the first known European expedition down the entire length of the Amazon River in 1541–1542, passing through a portion of Colombia in the Southern Hemisphere. European exploration of the Northern Hemisphere portion of Colombia dates back to 1499.
- 1563: (Chile) Desventuradas Islands — Juan Fernández made the first confirmed human sighting. Some accounts list the sighting as being in 1574 rather than 1563.
- 1568: Solomon Islands and Tuvalu — Álvaro de Mendaña reached the islands.
- 1574: Juan Fernández Islands — Juan Fernández was the first known human to sight the archipelago on November 22.
- 1592: Falkland Islands — John Davis sighted the islands in 1592. John Strong made the first recorded landing on the islands in 1690.
- 1595: Cook Islands — Álvaro de Mendaña reached the islands.
- 1606: Australia — Willem Janszoon made the first documented European contact.
- 1606: Torres Strait Islands — Luís Vaz de Torres, commanding part of the Pedro Fernandes de Queirós expedition, sailed through the strait between New Guinea and Australia in 1606, making the first recorded European passage through the region.
- 1606: Vanuatu — Pedro Fernandes de Queirós reached the islands.
- 1606: Pitcairn Islands — sighted by Pedro Fernandes de Queirós.
- 1609: Cocos (Keeling) Islands — William Keeling became the first known human to discover the Cocos (Keeling) Islands, while returning from the East Indies.
- 1616: Malawi — Gaspar Bocarro travelled overland from Tete, Mozambique to Kilwa in 1616, producing the earliest substantial European written account referring to the territory around the southern end of Lake Malawi. His journey is treated in scholarly literature as the beginning of the written European record for the country.
- 1616: Tonga — Willem Schouten and Jacob Le Maire reached Tonga in 1616 and 1643.
- 1616: Wallis and Futuna — Willem Schouten and Jacob Le Maire reached the islands.
- 1642: New Zealand — Abel Tasman made the first firm documented European sighting.
- 1642: Tasmania — Abel Tasman sighted and mapped the island.
- 1643: Christmas Island — William Mynors, master of the English East India Company vessel Royal Mary, was the first known human to sight the island on December 25, 1643. He named it Christmas Island after the day of the sighting. The first recorded landing occurred in 1688, when William Dampier and members of the crew of the Cygnet went ashore and found the island uninhabited.
- 1643: Fiji — Abel Tasman reached the islands.
- 1675: (South Georgia and the South Sandwich Islands) South Georgia — Anthony de la Roché is traditionally credited with being the first human to discover South Georgia in April 1675, although modern scholarship questions both his identity and whether the island he saw was actually South Georgia. James Cook made the first undisputed landing and detailed survey in 1775.
- 1722: Easter Island — Jacob Roggeveen reached the island, and noted that it was inhabited and had numerous large stone heads.
- 1722: American Samoa and Samoa — Jacob Roggeveen reached the Samoan islands.
- 1739: Bouvet Island — Jean-Baptiste Charles Bouvet de Lozier was the first known human to discover the island on January 1, 1739. He promptly lost the location of the island as he did not chart it correctly. This prevented others from reaching the island again until the early 19th century. It was so far away from Bouvet's reported position, though, that those who saw it thought it was a completely different island.
- 1765: Tokelau — John Byron reached the islands.
- 1767: (French Polynesia) Tahiti — Samuel Wallis aboard HMS Dolphin made the first European visit to Tahiti, arriving off the island on June 19 and anchoring at Matavai Bay. Wallis named it King George III Island.
- 1772: (French Southern and Antarctic Lands) Kerguelen Islands — Yves-Joseph de Kerguelen-Trémarec was the first known human to discover the archipelago on February 12, 1772, and named it France Australe.
- 1774: New Caledonia — James Cook sighted the island.
- 1774: Niue — James Cook made the first documented European landing on Niue during his second Pacific voyage in 1774.
- 1774: Norfolk Island — James Cook sighted and landed on the island.
- 1775: (South Georgia and the South Sandwich Islands) South Sandwich Islands — James Cook is the first known human to discover the South Sandwich Islands during his second voyage in 1775, sighting eight rocky masses through fog and snow. Cook did not land, and he initially could not determine whether all the features were separate islands. The northern three islands of the group were later discovered by Fabian von Bellingshausen in 1819, who also confirmed the islands seen by Cook.
- 1788: Coral Sea Islands — John Shortland discovered Middleton Reef on July 20 while returning from Australia to Batavia. The broader Coral Sea Islands and reefs were subsequently charted by numerous European navigators.
- 1788: (Australia) Lord Howe Island — Henry Lidgbird Ball made the first recorded human sighting of Lord Howe Island on February 17 and landed there on March 13, 1790, aboard HMS Supply.
- 1791: (New Zealand) Chatham Islands — William Robert Broughton became the first European to sight the Chatham Islands on November 22, after his ship, HMS Chatham, was blown off course. He landed on Rēkohu and claimed the islands for Britain.
- 1793: (Chile) Salas y Gómez Island — the Chilean government records that the island was discovered by the Spanish pilot José Salas Valdés on August 23. It was rediscovered and explored by José Manuel Gómez in October 1805, after which the island became known as Salas y Gómez.
- 1798: Nauru — John Fearn sighted the island.
- 1806: (New Zealand) Auckland Islands — Abraham Bristow became the first European to visit the Auckland Islands on August 18, naming them after Lord Auckland.
- 1810: (Australia) Macquarie Island — Frederick Hasselborough of the sealing brig Perseverance was the first known human to sight Macquarie Island, and landed on July 11.
- 1816: Botswana — the earliest recorded arrival of European missionary groups entering the region.
- 1820: Antarctica — the first confirmed human sightings of Antarctica occurred in January 1820 during expeditions led independently by Fabian Gottlieb von Bellingshausen, Edward Bransfield and Nathaniel Palmer; the priority of the first sighting remains disputed.
- 1821: (United States) Jarvis Island — the crew of the Eliza Francis were the first known humans to sight the island.
- 1833: Lesotho — Thomas Arbousset, Eugène Casalis and Constant Gosselin of the Paris Evangelical Missionary Society arrived among the Basotho in 1833 at the invitation of Moshoeshoe I, becoming the first Europeans to establish a known presence in what is now Lesotho. Arbousset subsequently explored the mountains of Lesotho and is described in modern scholarship as the first European to explore the Mont-aux-Sources and Blue Mountain.
- 1853: (Heard Island and McDonald Islands) Heard Island — John Heard made the first confirmed human sighting of Heard Island on November 25, 1853, aboard the Oriental.
- 1854: (Heard Island and McDonald Islands) McDonald Islands — William McDonald was the first known human to have sighted the McDonald Islands on January 4, 1854, aboard the Samarang.
- 1858: Burundi — Richard Francis Burton and John Hanning Speke reached the northern end of Lake Tanganyika in February 1858 and travelled along the lake's eastern shore, entering the region of Burundi. They are generally regarded as the first Europeans known to have reached the territory, although their movements in Burundi were limited and they relied heavily on local guides and existing caravan networks.
- 1862: Uganda — John Hanning Speke became the first European to visit the territory of present-day Uganda when he entered the kingdom of Buganda in January 1862, travelling west and then north around Lake Victoria. He was subsequently joined by James Augustus Grant, who reached Buganda in May 1862. Speke's expedition then travelled north through Bunyoro, making him the first European known to have visited both Buganda and Bunyoro.
- 1892: Rwanda — Oscar Baumann became the first European known to have entered the territory of present-day Rwanda, crossing its southern part from 11 to September 14, 1892, while exploring the region around the source of the Nile. He did not cross the country from east to west but his journey constitutes the earliest documented European entry into Rwanda.
- 1897: Somalia — the first formal European contact and administrative control over the Southern Hemisphere portion of Somalia occurred in 1897, when Kismayo was taken by Great Britain. European contact with the Northern Hemisphere portion of Somalia dates back to 1499, when it was sighted by Vasco da Gama.

=== Gallery ===
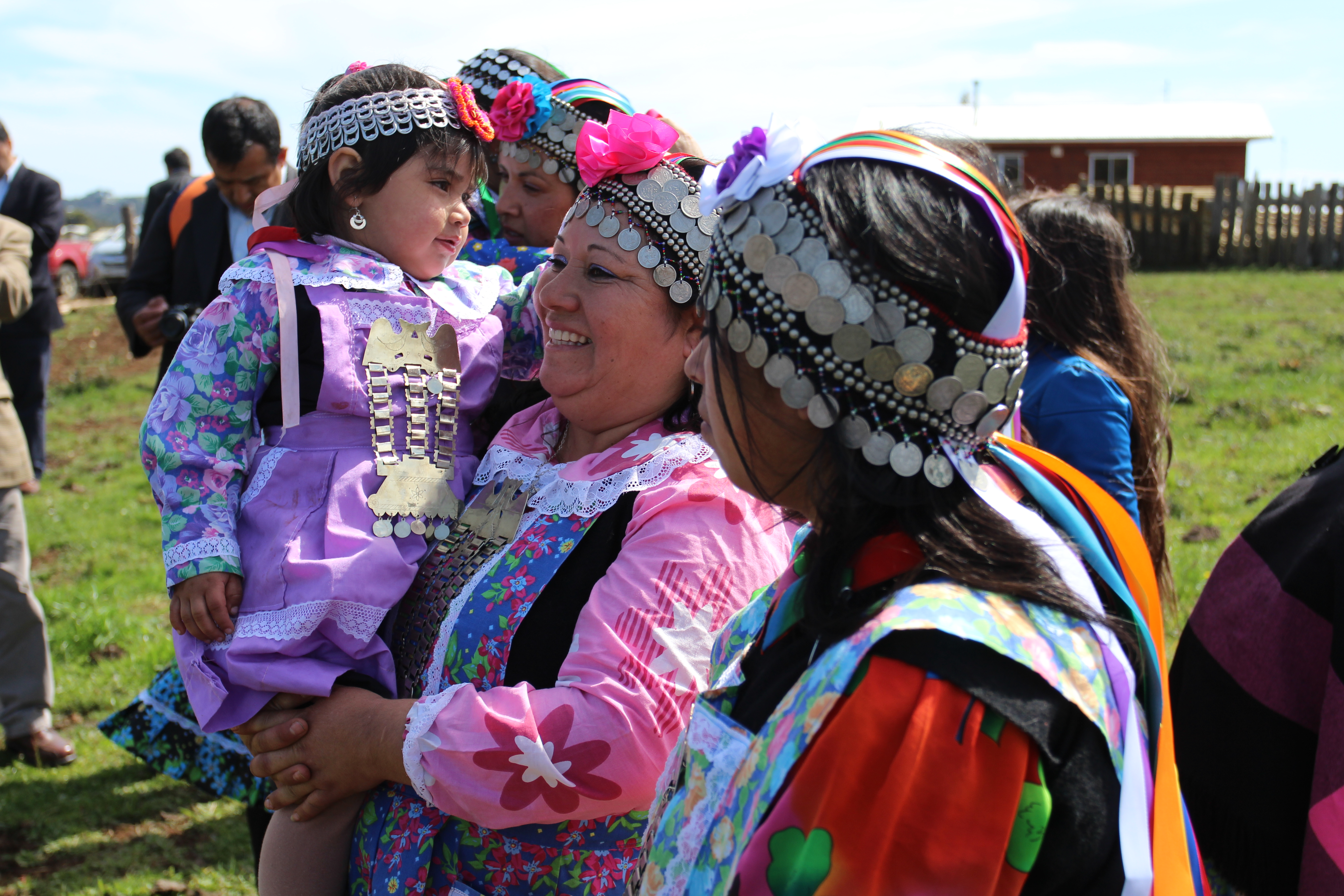
Mapuche from Tirúa, Chile. The Mapuche are a major indigenous group in Argentina and Chile.

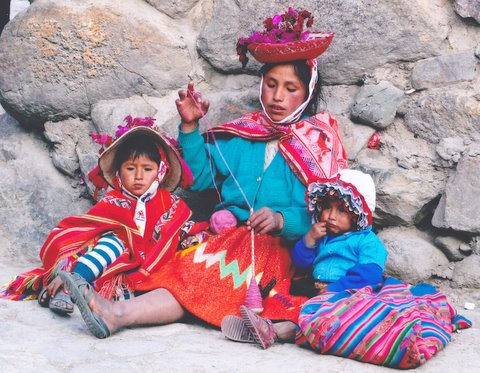
Quecha woman and children in Peru. Quechuas are one of the major Indigenous groups of Bolivia, Ecuador and Peru.

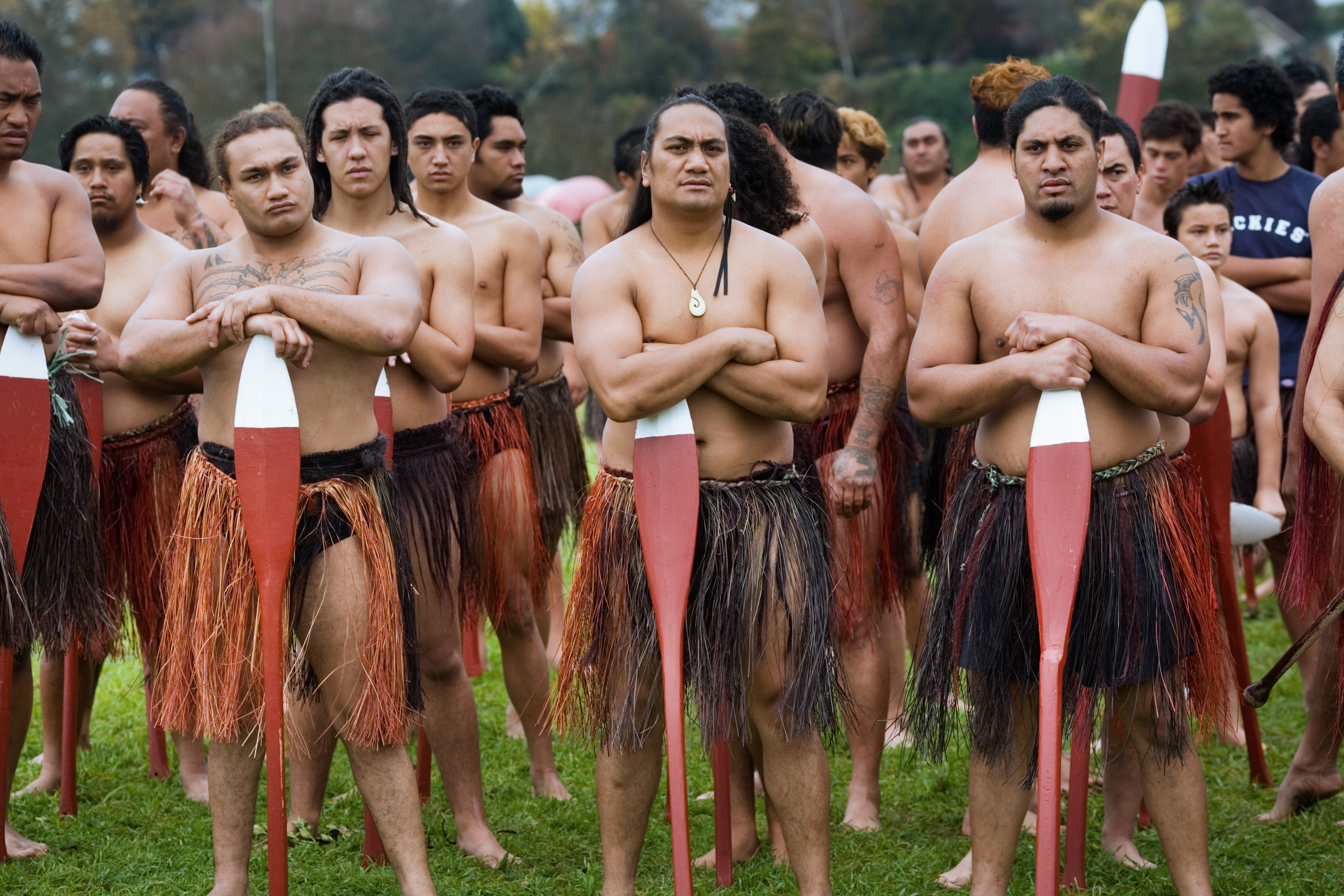
The Māoris, the indgenous peoples of New Zealand.

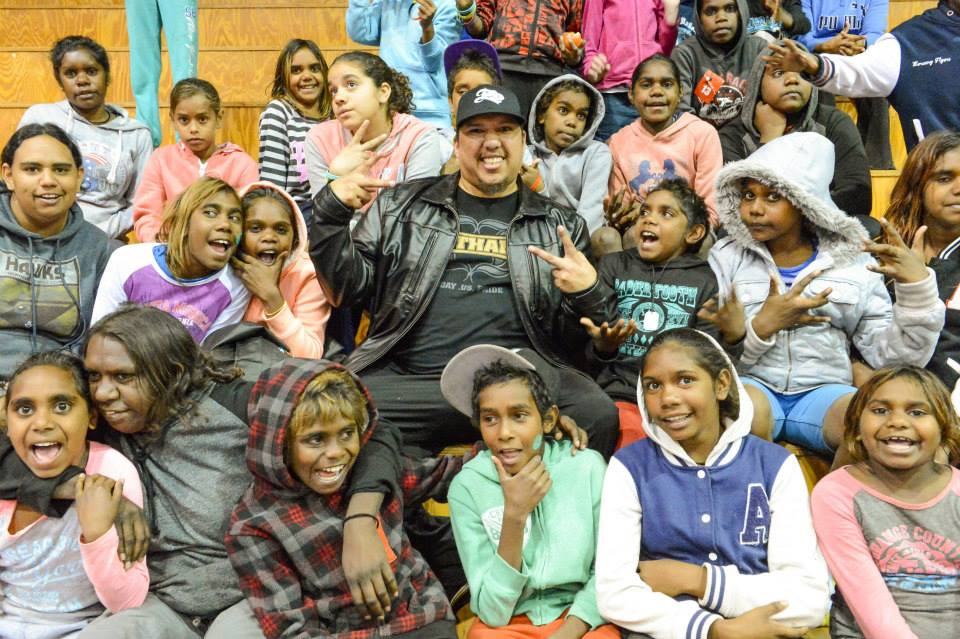
Indigenous Australians.

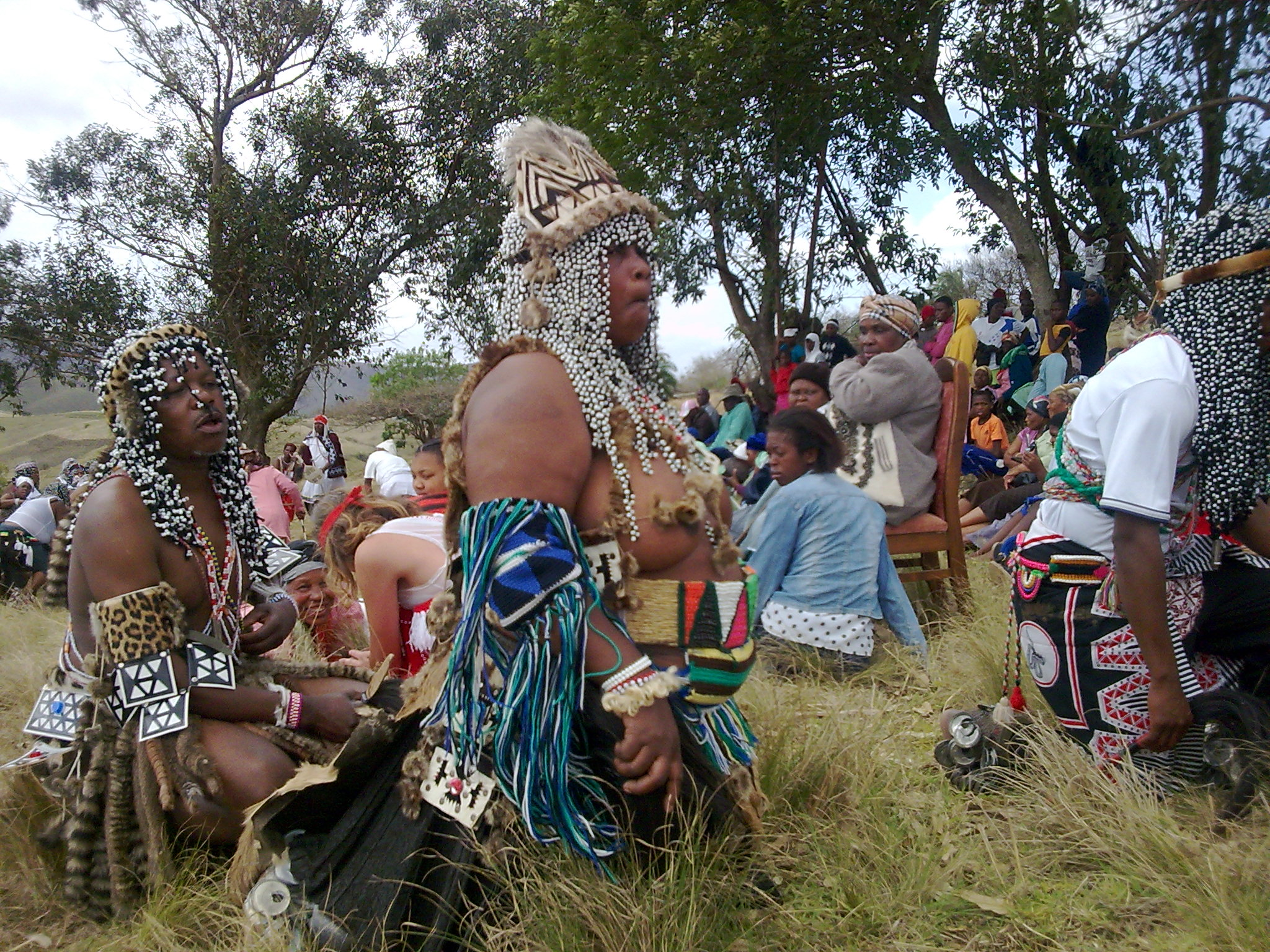
The Zulu, a major indigenous group in South Africa.

== Laws and legal systems ==
The Southern Hemisphere has no common legal system, with countries using civil law, common law, customary law, Islamic law and hybrid systems. Road-traffic rules are an example of some of the historical differences. Argentina, Bolivia, Brazil, Chile, Colombia, Ecuador, Paraguay, Peru and Uruguay drive on the right, as do several mainland African states. Most former British territories in southern and eastern Africa drive on the left, as do many insular states in the South Atlantic, South Pacific and Indian Ocean, including Australia, as most of these states are also former British territories. Left-hand traffic is strongly associated with British and regional colonial practice, but is not confined to former British possessions: Mozambique, formerly Portuguese, drives on the left as part of the southern African road system. Indonesia and Timor-Leste also do so, as does the Northern Hemisphere country Japan, reflecting a broader trend of island countries driving on the left. The island countries Samoa and Vanuatu were exceptions to this trend, as Samoa was formerly a German colony, while Vanuatu was jointly administered by France and the United Kingdom. Samoa changed from right to left-hand traffic on September 7, 2009, making it a notable example of a deliberate modern change in road law.

The Falkland Islands illustrate the separate legal status that some overseas territories possess. As a British Overseas Territory, they have their own Constitution, Legislative Assembly, courts and local laws; United Kingdom legislation applies only where extended or otherwise applicable, while English common law and equity apply subject to local legislation. During the Falklands War, Argentina occupied the islands from April to June 1982, and Argentine authorities temporarily ordered vehicles to drive on the right instead of the Islands' normal left-hand system. The Islands reverted to left-hand traffic after the end of the occupation.

Other Southern Hemisphere territories have varying degrees of legal autonomy from their metropolitan states, including the Pitcairn Islands, Saint Helena, Ascension and Tristan da Cunha, French Polynesia, New Caledonia, Wallis and Futuna, American Samoa, the Cook Islands, Niue and Tokelau. In Tokelau, New Zealand statutes do not automatically apply unless extended, while village rules, General Fono rules and Tokelau's constitutional arrangements form part of its legal order. Cook Islands and Niue are self-governing states in free association with New Zealand and have their own constitutions and domestic legislation. Norfolk Island, meanwhile, has undergone increasing integration into Australia's federal legal and administrative system since reforms beginning in the 2010s. Tokelau is excluded from the Comprehensive and Progressive Agreement for Trans-Pacific Partnership (CPTPP), a trade agreement among various Pacific Rim countries. By contrast, Australia's territories Christmas Island, Cocos (Keeling) Islands, Heard Island and McDonald Islands and Norfolk Island are not excluded from the CPTPP's geographic scope.

=== Criminalization of consensual same-sex sexual activity ===
Legal treatment of same-sex conduct varies substantially. As of April 30, 2024, ILGA World identified 62 United Nations member states that criminalized consensual same-sex sexual activity in law or practice. Many of these are Islamic countries in the Northern Hemisphere. Consensual same-sex sexual activity remains criminalized in the Southern Hemisphere countries Burundi, Comoros, Eswatini, Kenya, Malawi, Maldives, Papua New Guinea, Solomon Islands, Somalia, Tanzania, Tonga, Uganda, Zambia and Zimbabwe. Burundi provides imprisonment of up to two years, while the Islamic nation Comoros provides imprisonment and fines for same-sex sexual conduct under its Penal Code.

Kenya criminalizes consensual same-sex sexual activity between men, with penalties of up to 14 years under section 162 of the Penal Code, while Malawi and Zambia also retain criminal prohibitions. Uganda is particularly restrictive: its Anti-Homosexuality Act provides severe penalties, including the death penalty for certain cases of “aggravated homosexuality”.

Despite being a majority Islamic country, Indonesia does not generally criminalize consensual same-sex activity at the national level solely because it is same-sex. Indonesia's Aceh, which is above the equator, applies Islamic criminal law to same-sex acts. Some other local regulations impose additional restrictions.

South Africa decriminalized consensual same-sex sexual activity in 1998. Since 2012, Angola, Botswana, Lesotho, Mauritius, Mozambique, Nauru, Seychelles and São Tomé and Príncipe have also decriminalized consensual same-sex sexual activity. In June 2024, Namibia's High Court struck down colonial-era laws criminalizing sex between men, but the government appealed.

=== Death penalty ===
The usage of the death penalty also varies considerably in the Southern Hemisphere. Amnesty International classified countries (as of December 31, 2025) according to whether capital punishment was abolished, retained only for exceptional offences, abolished in practice or retained for ordinary crimes. Among Southern Hemisphere countries, capital punishment is abolished for all crimes in Angola, Argentina, Australia, Bolivia, Burundi, Colombia, Republic of the Congo, Ecuador, Gabon, Madagascar, Mauritius, Mozambique, Namibia, Nauru, Papua New Guinea, Paraguay, Rwanda, São Tomé and Príncipe, Seychelles, Solomon Islands, South Africa, Timor-Leste, Tuvalu, Uruguay, Vanuatu and Zambia. Brazil, Chile, Equatorial Guinea, Peru and Zimbabwe retain it only for exceptional offences, while Eswatini, Kenya, Malawi, Maldives, Tanzania and Tonga are abolitionist in practice. Botswana, Comoros, the Democratic Republic of the Congo, Indonesia, Lesotho, Somalia and Uganda retain the death penalty for ordinary crimes. Amnesty recorded executions in Somalia in 2025, while death sentences were also recorded in several other retentionist states. Australia abolished capital punishment federally in 1973 and progressively removed it from state and territory law, making it fully abolitionist.

=== Penal systems ===
Penal systems across the Southern Hemisphere vary according to each country's legal system, population and resources. Several operate a combination of remand facilities, sentenced prisons and different security classifications, ranging from minimum or open custody to medium, high and maximum security. For example, South Africa formally classifies sentenced prisoners as minimum, medium or maximum security according to assessed security risk, while Australia likewise uses multiple classification levels, including maximum-security categories. Brazil has the largest prison population in the Southern Hemisphere, and the third largest in the world, behind only China and the United States. Under Brazil's 1984 Lei de Execução Penal law, convicted prisoners are theoretically divided among closed, semi-open and open regimes, with progression toward less restrictive conditions intended as part of the rehabilitation process. Arrangements for women vary especially widely between countries because female prison populations are generally much smaller than male populations: some countries operate dedicated women's prisons, while others accommodate women in separate sections or units within larger mixed or primarily male correctional complexes. New Zealand, for example, operates three dedicated women's prisons, while in Australia both dedicated women's facilities and prisons containing separate male and female units exist. Brazil legally requires women to be held separately from men and also prohibits women's prisons from using male guards.

Penal systems in the Southern Hemisphere have also been strongly influenced by colonial history, with several territories in the South Pacific becoming particularly associated with penal transportation, exile and forced labour. Australia is the most prominent example: from 1787 to 1868, Britain transported about 166,000 men, women and children to its Australian colonies, where convict settlements combined imprisonment and punishment with forced labour and colonial development. The system included mainland sites as well as isolated locations such as Norfolk Island and Tasmania, with distance from Britain and the difficulty of escape making transportation itself part of the punishment. Norfolk Island was particularly notorious as a place for secondary punishment, being described as an "ultimate deterrent" for convicts considered unlikely to reform. This use of geographic isolation was not unique to Australia; neighboring New Caledonia, then already a French territory, operated as a major penal colony from 1864, receiving more than 22,000 French convicts between 1864 and 1897, including approximately 4,500 political prisoners associated with the Paris Commune. Prisoners were transported to remote island settlements including Île Nou, the Ducos Peninsula and the Île des Pins, where penal labour also contributed to French colonial development.

On the other side of the South Pacific, the Juan Fernández Islands of Chile were also used for confinement and exile, most notably on Más a Tierra (now known as Robinson Crusoe Island). Chile established a prison settlement on the island in the 19th century, and its extreme isolation made escape difficult, with this being an important reason for its use as a penal site. The Galápagos Islands of Ecuador similarly had a history of penal settlements, particularly on Isabela Island, where the Ecuadorian state established the Wall of Tears and its associated penal colony in the mid-20th century. Ecuador had been experimenting with using the islands as prisons as far back as the 1830s, when they first became part of the country. The islands' distance from the Ecuadorian mainland contributed to their suitability for exile and confinement.

=== Indigenous laws and policies ===
Indigenous land law has continuing significance across much of the Southern Hemisphere. In Australia, Mabo v Queensland (No 2) (1992) rejected the application of terra nullius and recognised native title arising from the traditional laws and customs of Aboriginal and Torres Strait Islander peoples. The decision led to the Native Title Act 1993, which established a national statutory framework for recognizing and protecting native title. In New Zealand, Māori land law is shaped by Te Tiriti o Waitangi / Treaty of Waitangi and the Te Ture Whenua Māori Act 1993, which recognises Māori customary and Māori freehold land. In Bolivia, Brazil, Colombia, Ecuador and Peru, constitutional or statutory systems likewise recognise various forms of Indigenous, communal or customary territorial rights. Australia, Chile and New Zealand are all members of the CPTPP, and in 2025 they created a pact in the organization called the Birrarung Statement, which aims to increase Indigenous participation in trade activity. The pact was named after Melbourne's Yarra River (indigenously known as Birrarung) and also included the Northern Hemisphere Pacific Rim countries Canada and Mexico.

=== Environmental law ===
In Australia, environmental regulation is divided among Commonwealth, state and territory governments. The Environment Protection and Biodiversity Conservation Act 1999 protects matters of national environmental significance, including World Heritage properties and the Great Barrier Reef World Heritage Area, while the Great Barrier Reef Marine Park Act 1975 establishes the Great Barrier Reef Marine Park and the Great Barrier Reef Marine Park Authority. The Marine Park is a multiple-use protected area divided into zones with different rules for fishing, tourism, research and other activities. The Reef's World Heritage Site status adds an international conservation framework, and management increasingly incorporates Traditional Owners and traditional knowledge.

The Galápagos Islands are their own distinct political province of Ecuador. Due to their high biodiversity, they are subject to a special legal regime concerning settlement, development, tourism and biosecurity. Galápagos forms part of the Eastern Tropical Pacific Marine Corridor, a regional conservation framework linking Ecuador with Colombia, Costa Rica and Panama and connecting Galápagos with other eastern Pacific islands including Gorgona Island, Malpelo Island, Cocos Island and Coiba Island (all of which are above the equator).

The Amazon rainforest in South America is governed by the domestic environmental laws of Bolivia, Brazil, Colombia, Ecuador, Peru and the Northern Hemisphere countries Guyana, Suriname and Venezuela. These countries engage in regional cooperation under the Amazon Cooperation Treaty Organization (ACTO). Brazil, which contains most of the Amazon biome, has particularly extensive forest protections under its Forest Code (Law No. 12,651/2012), including mandatory Legal Reserve areas on rural properties. In much of the Brazilian Amazon Legal region, rural properties in forest areas must maintain at least 80% of their area as native vegetation, alongside Permanent Preservation Areas protecting features such as riverbanks and springs.

== Historical events ==
Most of earth's major conflicts and historical events have occurred in the Northern Hemisphere, where the majority of the world's population, historically important civilizations, and major centres of political power have been concentrated. Conflicts that have taken place entirely or partly south of the equator include the Anglo-Zulu War (1879), the First Boer War (1880–1881), the Second Boer War (1899–1902), the First World War campaigns in German South West Africa and German East Africa, the Argentine War of Independence (1810–1818), the Paraguayan War (1864–1870), the South American War of the Pacific (1879–1884), the Chaco War (1932–1935), the Angolan War of Independence (1961–1974), the Mozambican War of Independence (1964–1974), the South African Border War (1966–1990), the Mozambican Civil War (1977–1992), the Angolan Civil War (1975–2002), the Falklands War (1982), the First Congo War (1996–1997), the Second Congo War (1998–2003), and the Rwandan genocide (1994). During the Second World War, major campaigns and battles were also fought in the South Pacific, including the Japanese conquest of the Dutch East Indies (now Indonesia), the Battle of the Coral Sea, the Guadalcanal campaign and the Kokoda Track campaign. Other major non-war events include Charles Darwin's 1835 visit to the Galápagos Islands, which helped form the theory of evolution, the first release of Nelson Mandela from prison on 11 February 1990, a key moment in the eventual end of apartheid in South Africa; French nuclear weapons testing in French Polynesia between 1966 and 1996; and the 1974 "Rumble in the Jungle" boxing match between Muhammad Ali and George Foreman, held in Kinshasa in the Democratic Republic of the Congo (then Zaire). In October 1704, Scottish sailor Alexander Selkirk became marooned on the uninhabited Juan Fernández Islands, which had not been incorporated into Chile yet at that point. His experiences there inspired the 1719 book Robinson Crusoe.

During the transatlantic slave trade of the 16th to 19th centuries, Brazil received the largest number of enslaved Africans of any country in the Americas (4.8 million), and it was the last American country to abolish the practice of slavery. However, African slavery in the Americas was generally concentrated in Northern Hemisphere areas rather than Southern Hemisphere areas, including the Caribbean and the United States. In the 19th century, South Pacific Islanders were subjected to a widespread system of forced labour recruitment known as blackbirding. Thousands of men, women and children were kidnapped, deceived or coerced onto European and South American ships and transported across the Pacific. Those from Melanesian islands near Australia like the Solomon Islands and Vanuatu were taken to Australia to work on Queensland's sugar and cotton plantations, while others in more eastern Polynesian islands were typically transported to Peru, where they were forced into agricultural labour, guano extraction and domestic work. Although some Islanders entered labour contracts (particularly ones taken to Australia), many had little understanding of the conditions they would face or were taken entirely against their will. The death rate was significantly higher among Pacific islanders taken to Peru, and many of the islanders taken to Australia continued to live there once the practice of blackbirding ended. Blackbirding also extended beyond Australia and Peru into northern Latin America. During the 1890s, approximately 1,200 people from the Gilbert Islands in Kiribati were recruited to work on coffee plantations in southern Mexico and Guatemala. Fewer than 800 actually arrived, with hundreds dying on the ships, and an estimated quarter to a third of those who reached the region died during their first year, with only 250 survivors eventually being returned to Kiribati. Tokelau was particularly affected by Peruvian slave raids of 1863. Approximately 253 Tokelauans, representing 47% of the population, were tricked into entering Peruvian ships, including virtually all able-bodied adult men, as well as women and children. On the ships, force was used to prevent the Tokelauans from escaping once they realized what was happening to them. The loss devastated the three main atolls, leaving communities largely composed of women, children and elderly people. Most of the Tokelauans taken to Peru died from disease there. Easter Island is the closest Polynesian island to Peru, and as a result its small population suffered catastrophic losses, with approximately 1,400 people abducted by Peruvian slave ships between 1862 and 1863. Due to public pressure, Peru eventually returned the surviving Easter Islanders, but only 15 survived the journey home, with 85 dying on the crowded ship. Those who did survive the journey brought back diseases such as smallpox, which further decimated the local population.

The Southern Hemisphere has hosted several FIFA World Cups and FIFA World Cup finals, including the inaugural tournament in Uruguay in 1930, Brazil in 1950 and 2014, Chile in 1962, Argentina in 1978, and South Africa in 2010. Over the tournament's history, three Southern Hemisphere countries (Argentina, Brazil and Uruguay) have lifted the trophy on multiple occasions, while Brazil is the only country in the world to have qualified for every edition since 1930. The other Southern Hemisphere countries which have appeared at the tournament since 1930 are Angola, Australia, Bolivia, Chile, Colombia, the Democratic Republic of the Congo (as both Zaire and their current name) Ecuador, Indonesia (as Dutch East Indies), New Zealand, Peru and South Africa. The 1956 Summer Olympics in Melbourne were the first to be held in the Southern Hemisphere. Subsequent editions have been held in Australia, including Sydney in 2000, and the upcoming 2032 Games in Brisbane, making Australia one of the few countries to host the Summer Olympic Games across three different cities. At the 2002 Winter Olympics, Australian speed skater Steven Bradbury won the Southern Hemisphere's first-ever Winter Olympic gold medal in the 1,000m short-track event. Trailing in last place during the final lap, Bradbury watched as all four competitors ahead of him crashed into each other on the final bend. He glided across the finish line untouched to claim gold. This event birthed the Australian idiom "doing a Bradbury", which refers to achieving unexpected success simply by staying on one's feet while the competition collapses. Cadel Evans, an Australian cyclist born in Katherine, Northern Territory, was the first person from the Southern Hemisphere to win the Tour De France in 2011. The race was subsequently won by Colombian Egan Bernal in 2018, who became the first Latin American to win, although Bernal was born in a part of Colombia which is above the equator.

By death toll, the worst terrorist incident to have ever occurred in the Southern Hemisphere is the 2001 Angola train attack, which was part of the country's civil war and killed 252 people. Other major terrorist incidents in the Southern Hemisphere include the 1998 United States embassy bombings, which occurred simultaneously in Kenya and Tanzania and killed 224, and the 2002 Bali Bombings which killed 202. In 1996, the hijacked Ethiopian Airlines Flight 961 crashed in an area of the Indian Ocean which was below the equator, killing 125. The crash occurred near Grande Comore, the main island of Comoros. This event is not classified as a terrorist incident, since it was carried out by three Ethiopian men who were demanding political asylum in Australia.

Certain areas of the Southern Hemisphere are vulnerable to earthquakes and volcanic eruptions, and this is driven by intense tectonic activity along the southern Pacific Ring of Fire. One of the most notable seismic events is the 1960 Valdivia earthquake in Chile, which remains the most powerful earthquake ever recorded at 9.6 on the moment magnitude scale. The event caused an estimated 1,000 to 6,000 deaths mainly in Chile, as well as tsunamis which had varying impacts across the Pacific Rim, including in Australia and areas above the equator like Hawaii, Japan, the Philippines and the Aleutian Islands. The 1970 Ancash earthquake and Huascarán debris avalanche in Peru resulted in up to 70,000 fatalities and is the deadliest natural disaster to have occurred entirely in the Southern Hemisphere. In more recent times, the 2009 Samoa earthquake and tsunami caused at least 189 fatalities, the 2010 Chile Earthquake caused 525 fatalities and the 2011 Christchurch earthquake in New Zealand caused 185 fatalities. Major volcanic eruptions have occurred entirely south of the equator in Indonesia, including the 1815 eruption of Mount Tambora, which killed at least 10,000 people and is the most powerful volcanic explosion in recorded human history. The eruption injected huge amounts of sulfur dioxide and ash into the stratosphere, causing severe global cooling in areas of the Northern Hemisphere like Europe and North America, leading to what is known as the "Year Without a Summer". The 1883 eruption of Krakatoa in Indonesia is another one of the most destructive volcanic events in recorded history, causing an estimated 36,417 deaths.

The 2004 Indian Ocean earthquake and tsunami killed 228,000 people and is one of the worst natural disasters ever recorded, most heavily impacting Indonesia. However, nearly all Indonesian fatalities were in Aceh Province, which is above the equator and lost 170,000 people. The disaster also caused thousands of fatalities in other Northern Hemisphere areas such as India, Sri Lanka and Thailand.

Australia is a deeply fire prone area, and the worst bushfire disaster to occur in the country was the 2009 Black Saturday bushfires, which claimed 173 lives. Other major bushfire events in Australia include the 1983 Ash Wednesday bushfires and the 2019–2020 Black Summer bushfires, which burned over 24 million hectares.

=== Notable international sporting matches between Southern Hemisphere countries ===
==== Cricket World Cup Finals (Men's & Women's) ====
- 1997 Women's Cricket World Cup final: Australia vs. New Zealand
- 2000 Women's Cricket World Cup final: Australia vs. New Zealand
- 2010 ICC Women's World Twenty20 final: Australia vs. New Zealand
- 2015 Men's Cricket World Cup final: Australia vs. New Zealand
- 2021 Men's T20 World Cup final: Australia vs. New Zealand
- 2023 Women's T20 World Cup final: Australia vs. South Africa
- 2024 Women's T20 World Cup final: New Zealand vs. South Africa

==== FIFA World Cup inter-confederation play-offs ====
- 1994 FIFA World Cup play-off: Argentina (CONMEBOL) vs. Australia (Oceania Football Confederation)
- 2002 FIFA World Cup play-off: Australia (Oceania Football Confederation) vs. Uruguay (CONMEBOL)
- 2006 FIFA World Cup play-off: Australia (Oceania Football Confederation) vs. Uruguay (CONMEBOL)
- 2018 FIFA World Cup play-off: New Zealand (Oceania Football Confederation) vs. Peru (CONMEBOL)
- 2022 FIFA World Cup play-off: Australia (Asian Football Confederation) vs. Peru (CONMEBOL)

==== Netball World Cup finals ====
- 1991 World Netball Championships final: Australia vs. New Zealand
- 1995 World Netball Championships final: Australia vs. New Zealand
- 1999 World Netball Championships final: Australia vs. New Zealand
- 2003 World Netball Championships final: Australia vs. New Zealand
- 2007 World Netball Championships final: Australia vs. New Zealand
- 2011 World Netball Championships final: Australia vs. New Zealand
- 2015 Netball World Cup final: Australia vs. New Zealand
- 2019 Netball World Cup final: Australia vs. New Zealand

==== Rugby League World Cup finals ====
- 1988 Rugby League World Cup final: Australia vs. New Zealand
- 2008 Rugby League World Cup final: Australia vs. New Zealand
- 2013 Rugby League World Cup final: Australia vs. New Zealand
- 2021 Rugby League World Cup final: Australia vs. Samoa

==== Rugby World Cup finals ====
- 1995 Rugby World Cup final: New Zealand vs. South Africa
- 2015 Rugby World Cup final: Australia vs. New Zealand
- 2023 Rugby World Cup final: New Zealand vs. South Africa

== Records ==
=== Tallest buildings in the Southern Hemisphere ===
Rank	Building	Height	Location	Year completed
1	Autograph Tower	382.9 m (1,256 ft)	Indonesia (Jakarta)	2022
2	Q1	322.5 m (1,058 ft)	Australia (Gold Coast)	2005
3	Australia 108	316.7 m (1,039 ft)	Australia (Melbourne)	2020
4	Luminary Tower	301.2 m (988 ft)	Indonesia (Jakarta)	2023
5	Gran Torre Santiago	300.0 m (984 ft)	Chile (Santiago)	2014

== Continents and submerged continents ==
Africa
About one-third of the continent, from south of Mogadishu in Somalia in the east to south of Libreville in Gabon in the west. From the Equator (Latitude: 0°) to Cape Agulhas (Latitude: 34°50′S).
Antarctica
The entire continent and its associated islands are within the Southern Hemisphere. From Prime Head, at the northern tip of the Trinity Peninsula (Latitude: 63°12′48″S) to the South Pole (Latitude: 90° S).
Asia
The entire continental mainland is within the Northern Hemisphere; only the southern portion of Maritime Southeast Asia, including Timor-Leste and most of Indonesia, plus the British Indian Ocean Territory and two out of 26 atolls of the Maldives, part of the Indian subcontinent in the Indian Ocean, are in the Southern Hemisphere. From the Equator (Latitude: 0°) to Pamana Island, Indonesia (Latitude: 11°00'S).
Australia
The entire continent and most of its associated islands are within the Southern Hemisphere. From the Equator (Latitude: 0°) to Bishop and Clerk Islets, Tasmania, Australia (Latitude: 55°03′ S).
South America
Most of the continent, from south of the Amazon River mouth in Brazil in the east to north of Quito in Ecuador in the west. From the Equator (Latitude: 0°) to Águila Islet, Diego Ramírez Islands, Chile (Latitude: 56°32′16″S), or, if the South Sandwich Islands are included as part of South America, Cook Island, South Georgia and the South Sandwich Islands (Latitude: 59°29′20″S).
Zealandia
The entire submerged continent, including New Caledonia, New Zealand, Norfolk Island, and other associated low-lying islands above sea level, is within the Southern Hemisphere. From Belep, New Caledonia, France (Latitude: 19°45′00″S) to Jacquemart Island (Latitude: 52°37′S).

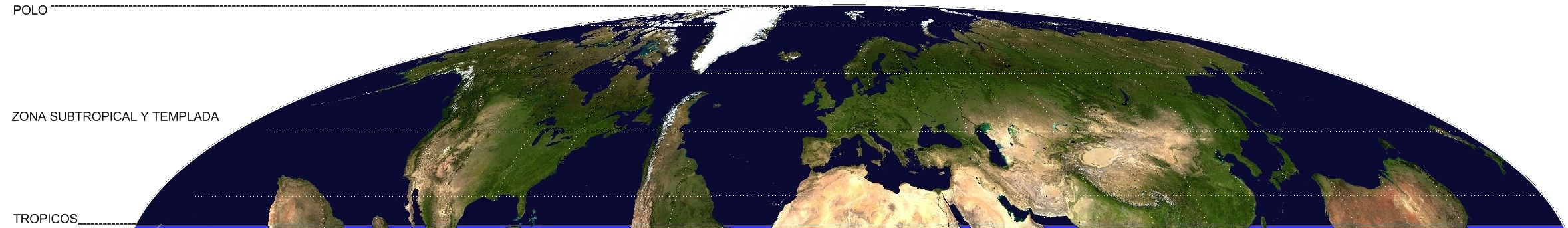
A map showing territories in the Southern and Northern Hemispheres (excluding Antarctica and tropical zones) positioned within the same hemisphere, allowing for a comparison of latitudes. For example, it can be seen that the Ireland Island and the Tierra del Fuego Island lie at the same latitude in their respective hemispheres, as do the cities of Belfast and Ushuaia.

== Mainland countries or territories ==
Africa
Entirely —
- Angola
- Botswana
- Burundi
- Eswatini
- Lesotho
- Malawi
- Mozambique
- Namibia
- Rwanda
- South Africa
- Tanzania
- Zambia
- Zimbabwe
Mostly —
- Democratic Republic of the Congo
- Gabon
- Republic of the Congo
Partly —
- Equatorial Guinea
- Kenya
- Somalia
- Uganda

Asia
The entire continental mainland is wholly within the Northern Hemisphere. Only the southern portion of Maritime Southeast Asia, plus the British Indian Ocean Territory and two out of 26 atolls of Maldives in the Indian Ocean are in the Southern Hemisphere.

Americas
Entirely —
- Argentina
- Bolivia
- Chile
- Paraguay
- Peru
- Uruguay
Mostly —
- Brazil
- Ecuador
Partly —
- Colombia

Antarctica
Entirely —
- Antarctica (Antarctic Treaty signatories)

Oceania
Entirely —
- Australia
- New Zealand

== Island countries or territories ==
=== Atlantic Ocean ===
Entirely —

- Annobón (province of Equatorial Guinea)
- Bouvet Island (Norway)
- Falkland Islands / Islas Malvinas (Administered by the United Kingdom / Claimed by Argentina)
- Saint Helena, Ascension and Tristan da Cunha (United Kingdom)
  - Ascension Island
  - Saint Helena
  - Tristan da Cunha
    - Gough Island
- South Georgia and the South Sandwich Islands (Administered by the United Kingdom / Claimed by Argentina)
- Snake Island, Brazil

Partly —

- São Tomé and Príncipe (most of Rolas Island)

=== Indian Ocean ===
Entirely —

- Ashmore and Cartier Islands (Australia)
- British Indian Ocean Territory (Administered by the United Kingdom / Claimed by Mauritius)
- Australian Indian Ocean Territories (Australia)
  - Christmas Island
  - Cocos (Keeling) Islands
- Comoros
- French Southern Territories (France)
- Heard Island and McDonald Islands (Australia)
- Java and Lesser Sunda Islands, Indonesia
- Madagascar
- Mauritius
- Mayotte (France)
- Prince Edward Islands (South Africa)
- Réunion (France)
- Seychelles
- Timor-Leste

Partly —

- Maldives
- Sumatra, Indonesia

=== Pacific Ocean ===
Entirely —

- American Samoa (United States)
- Cook Islands (New Zealand)
- Coral Sea Islands (Australia)
- Desventuradas Islands (Insular Chile)
- Easter Island (Insular Chile)
  - Salas and Gómez Island
- Fiji
  - Rotuma
- French Polynesia (France)
  - Tahiti
- Jarvis Island (United States)
- Juan Fernández Islands (Insular Chile)
  - Alejandro Selkirk Island
  - Robinson Crusoe Island
  - Santa Clara Island
- Most of the Galápagos Islands
  - Bartolomé Island
  - Daphne Island
  - Española Island
  - Fernandina Island
  - Floreana Island
  - Guy Fawkes Island
  - James Island
  - Jervis Island
  - Nameless Island
  - North Seymour Island
  - Pinzón Island
  - Santa Cruz Island
  - Santa Fe Island
  - San Cristóbal Island
  - South Plaza Island
- Nauru
- New Caledonia (France)
- New Zealand
- Niue (New Zealand)
- Norfolk Island (Australia)
- Papua New Guinea
- Pitcairn, Henderson, Ducie and Oeno Islands (United Kingdom)
- Samoa
- Solomon Islands
- Tasmania, Australia
  - Macquarie Island
- Tokelau (New Zealand)
- Tonga
- Tuvalu
- Vanuatu
- Wallis and Futuna (France)

Mostly —

- Isabela Island, Galápagos Islands
- Kiribati
- Sulawesi and Western New Guinea (Indonesia)

Partly —

- Kalimantan, Indonesia
- Maluku Islands, Indonesia

=== Southern Ocean ===
Entirely —

- Antarctic islands
  - Balleny Islands (Antarctic Treaty signatories / Claimed by New Zealand)
  - Peter I Island (Antarctic Treaty signatories / Claimed by Norway)
  - South Orkney Islands (Antarctic Treaty signatories / Claimed by Argentina and the United Kingdom)
  - South Shetland Islands (Antarctic Treaty signatories / Claimed by Argentina, Chile, and the United Kingdom)

=== Default geographical coordinates for countries and territories in both the Northern and Southern Hemisphere ===
The following is the default geographic coordinates for countries and territories straddling the equator, per their centroids:

==== Southern default coordinates ====
- Brazil 10°00′S 52°00′W
- Democratic Republic of the Congo 4°19′S 15°19′E
- Ecuador 2°00′S 77°30′W
- Gabon 1°00′S 12°00′E
- Galápagos Islands 0°30′S 90°30′W
- Indonesia 5°00′S 120°00′E
- Kenya 1°16′S 36°48′E
- Republic of the Congo 1°44′S 15°56′E

==== Northern default coordinates ====
- Colombia 4°00′N 72°00′W
- Equatorial Guinea 1°30′N 10°00′E
- Kiribati 1°25′N 173°00′E
- Maldives 4°18′N 73°51′E
- São Tomé and Príncipe 0°19′N 6°36′E
- Somalia 10°00′N 49°00′E
- Uganda 1°00′N 32°00′E

== Southern Hemisphere institutions ==
=== Political organizations ===
==== Andean Community ====
- Bolivia
- Colombia
- Ecuador
- Peru

==== Brazilian–Argentine Agency for Accounting and Control of Nuclear Materials (ABACC) ====
- Argentina
- Brazil

==== Mercosur ====
- Argentina
- Bolivia
- Brazil
- Paraguay
- Uruguay

==== Melanesian Spearhead Group (MSG) ====
- Fiji
- New Caledonia
- Papua New Guinea
- Solomon Islands
- Vanuatu

==== Southern African Customs Union (SACU) ====
- Botswana
- Eswatini
- Lesotho
- Namibia
- South Africa

==== Southern African Development Community (SADC) ====
- Angola
- Botswana
- Comoros
- Democratic Republic of the Congo
- Eswatini
- Lesotho
- Madagascar
- Malawi
- Mauritius
- Mozambique
- Namibia
- Seychelles
- South Africa
- Tanzania
- Zambia
- Zimbabwe

=== Trade agreements ===
==== Australia–Chile Free Trade Agreement ====
- Australia
- Chile

==== Australia–New Zealand Closer Economic Relations Trade Agreement ====
- Australia
- New Zealand

==== Indonesia–Australia Comprehensive Economic Partnership Agreement ====
- Australia
- Indonesia

==== PACER Plus ====
- Australia
- Cook Islands
- Kiribati
- Nauru
- New Zealand
- Niue
- Samoa
- Solomon Islands
- Tonga
- Tuvalu
- Vanuatu

==== Peru-Australia Free Trade Agreement ====
- Australia
- Peru

=== Treaties ===
==== Australia–New Zealand Maritime Treaty ====
- Australia
- New Zealand

==== Boundary Treaty of 1881 ====
- Argentina
- Chile

==== Canberra Pact ====
- Australia
- New Zealand

==== Luanda Agreement ====
- Democratic Republic of the Congo
- Uganda

==== Nkomati Accord (defunct treaty) ====
- Mozambique
- South Africa

==== Ocean of Peace Alliance ====
- Australia
- Fiji

==== Pretoria Accord ====
- Democratic Republic of the Congo
- Rwanda

==== Salomón–Lozano Treaty ====
- Colombia
- Peru

==== Torres Strait Treaty ====
- Australia
- Papua New Guinea

==== Treaty of Ancón ====
- Chile
- Peru

==== Treaty of Montevideo (1828) ====
- Argentina
- Brazil

==== Treaty of Montevideo (1979) ====
- Argentina
- Chile

==== Timor Gap Treaty (defunct treaty) ====
- Australia
- Indonesia

==== Timor Sea Treaty (defunct treaty) ====
- Australia
- Timor-Leste

==== Treaty of Peace and Friendship (1904) ====
- Bolivia
- Chile

==== Treaty of Peace and Friendship (1984) ====
- Argentina
- Chile

==== Treaty of Petrópolis ====
- Bolivia
- Brazil

==== Treaty of Rarotonga ====
- Australia
- Cook Islands
- Fiji
- Kiribati
- Nauru
- New Zealand
- Niue
- Papua New Guinea
- Samoa
- Solomon Islands
- Tonga
- Tuvalu
- Vanuatu

==== Treaty of the Río de la Plata ====
- Argentina
- Uruguay

== See also ==
- Geographical zone
- Global North and Global South
- Land and water hemispheres
- Northern Hemisphere
- South Pole
