= Melanella martarum =

- Melanella martarum L. Souza, Asorey & Sellanes, 2024; (A, B) Holotype, MNHNCL-205421. (C, D, H). Paratype, SCBUCN 5482. (E–G). Paratypes, SCBUCN 8611. (A, C, E–G). Frontal view. (B, D). Dorsal view. (H). Detail of teleoconch surface, close to suture. Scale bars: (A–G) = one mm (entire shells at same scale); H = 100 µm.

Scientific classification
- Kingdom: Animalia
- Phylum: Mollusca
- Class: Gastropoda
- Subclass: Caenogastropoda
- Order: Littorinimorpha
- Family: Eulimidae
- Genus: Melanella
- Species: M. martarum

Binomial name
- Melanella martarum L. Souza, Asorey & Sellanes, 2024

Species of gastropod

Melanella martarum is a species of sea snail, a marine gastropod mollusk in the family Eulimidae. The species is one of many species known to exist within the genus, Melanella.

== Description ==
The length of the shell attains 8.1 mm, its diameter 2.6 mm.

(Original description) The shell is conical, with an obtuse apex with a spire angle of 20°. The larval shell is vitreous, consisting of about 4.0 convex whorls, 480 µm in height, and smooth, with the transition to the teleoconch marked by a distinct incremental scar. The teleoconch is vitreous, not colored, and has about 9.0 whorls of flat outline; the suture is shallow, slightly impressed, and sloping; the subsutural zone is about 1/5 of the height of the whorl; and the surface is glossy and smooth, except for incremental scars that appear at irregular intervals. The body whorl comprises about 45% of the shell length; the base is rounded. The aperture is high, measuring 65% of the ultimate whorl height, and is pear-shaped, moderately expanded laterally, acute posteriorly, and rounded and spread anteriorly; the outer lip is thickened, very sinuous, opisthocline, retracted near the suture, thereafter strongly projecting, and retracted in the distal region, reaching maximum projection at the middle of the outer lip height; and the inner lip is thin, sinuous, and sloping. The shell is not umbilicate.

== Distribution ==
This species occurs in the Pacific Ocean on the Salas y Gómez Ridge.
