= Pukao (seamount) =

Submarine volcano, the most westerly in the Easter Seamount Chain

Coordinates: 26.9323°S 110.2490°W

Pukao Seamount
- Summit depth: Below Sea level
- Height: 2500+ m

Location
- Location: west of Easter Island

Geology
- Type: Submarine volcano
- Volcanic arc/chain: Sala Y Gomez ridge
- Age of rock: Pleistocene
- Last eruption: >100,000 BCE

The Pukao Seamount is a submarine volcano, the most westerly in the Easter Seamount Chain or Sala y Gómez ridge. To the east are Moai (seamount) and then Easter Island. It rises over 2,500 metres from the ocean floor to within a few hundred metres of the sea surface. The Pukao Seamount is fairly young, and believed to have developed in the last few hundred thousand years as the Nazca Plate floats over the Easter hotspot.

== See also ==
- Easter Island
- Sala y Gómez
