= Moai (seamount) =

Second-most westerly submarine volcano in the Easter Seamount Chain

- Orthographic projection centered on Easter Island
- Height: >2,500 metres

Location
- Location: Pacific Ocean, west of Easter Island
- Coordinates: 27.1°S 109.85°W

Geology
- Type: Submarine volcano
- Volcanic arc/chain: Sala y Gómez ridge
- Age of rock: Pleistocene
- Last eruption: >100,000 BCE

The Moai Seamount is a submarine volcano, the second most westerly in the Easter Seamount Chain or Sala y Gómez ridge. It is east of Pukao seamount and west of Easter Island. It rises over 2,500 metres from the ocean floor to within a few hundred metres of the sea surface. The Moai seamount is fairly young, having developed in the last few hundred thousand years as the Nazca Plate floats over the Easter hotspot.

The Moai seamount was named after the moai statues of neighbouring Easter Island.

== See also ==
- Easter Island
- Sala y Gómez
