= Easter hotspot =

Volcanic hotspot in the Pacific Ocean

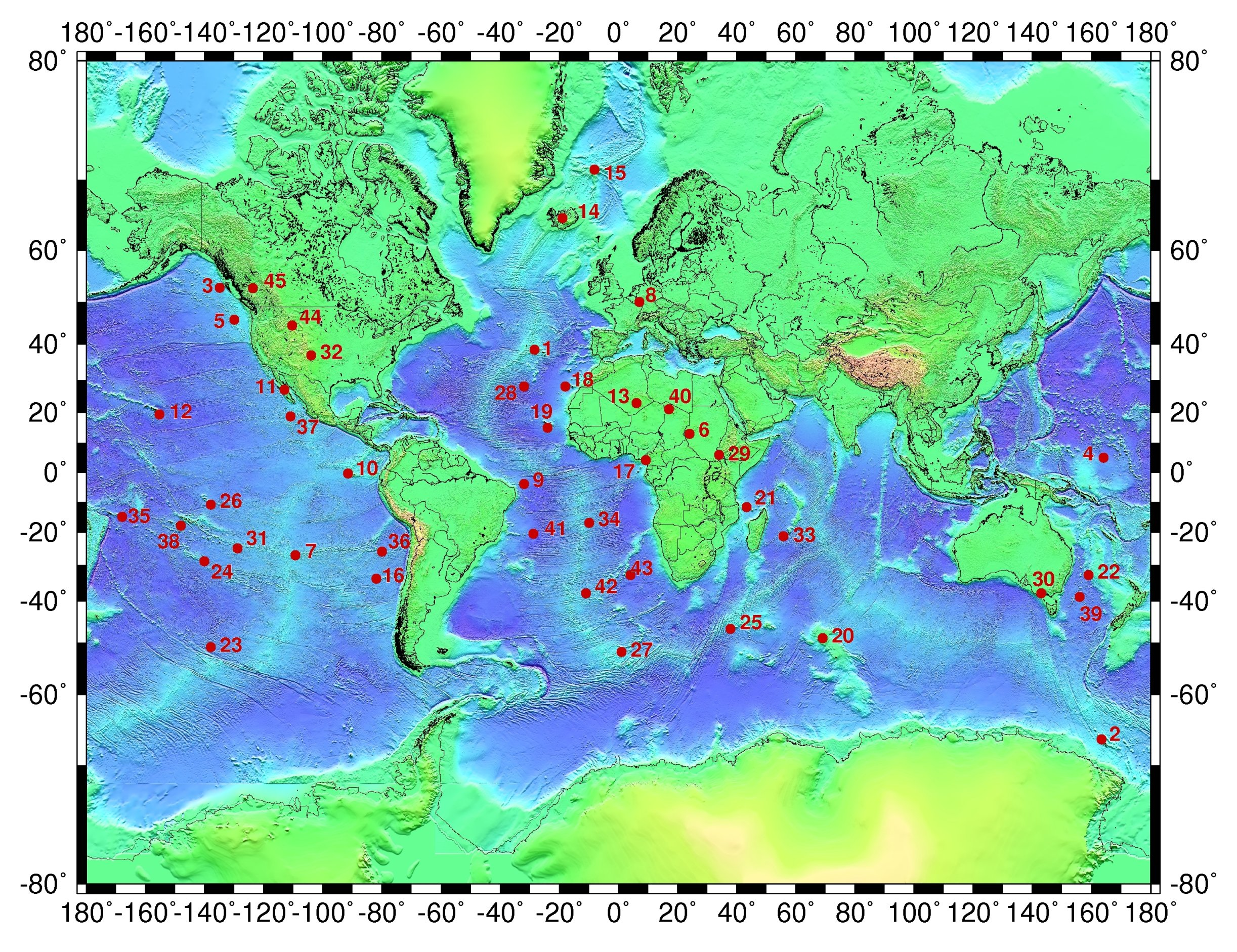
The Easter hotspot (#7) on the map

The Easter hotspot is a volcanic hotspot located in the southeastern Pacific Ocean. The hotspot created the Sala y Gómez Ridge which includes Easter Island, Salas y Gómez Island and the Pukao seamount.

== Geography ==
The Easter hotspot is a volcanic hotspot located in the southeastern Pacific Ocean, and forms part of the Easter–Sala y Gómez volcanic chain, stretching over 4,000 km (2,500 mi) across the Nazca Plate. Easter and Salas y Gómez Island mark the emergent tips of massive undersea volcanoes along the ridge. There is evidence of the presence of more than 3,000 volcanic centers. Detailed morphological analysis using bathymetric data identified sea mounts that are more than 1,000 m (3,300 ft) high that are aligned and spread along the chain, while smaller ones with circular bases are scattered across the area.

== Geology ==
The region’s volcanism is thus shaped by both deep mantle forces and dynamic plate tectonic activity. It was created by the mantle plume, is one of the longest volcanic chains in the Easter Microplate of the Pacific Ocean. The mantle plume feeding this hotspot comes from about 600 km (370 mi) deep inside the Earth. This plume pushes westward on the nearby East Pacific Rise (a major mid-ocean ridge) while its most buoyant part causes volcanic activity on the sea floor giving rise to islands like Easter Island. It is considered to be the surface tip of a much bigger, deep mantle structure connected to the Pacific Large Low Shear Velocity Province. Easter Island is an example of an end-member type of hotspot volcano, characterized by low eruptive rate, immature rift zones, and scarce sector collapses. The hotspot might also have contributed to the formation of the Tuamotu Archipelago, Line Islands, and the chain of seamounts lying in between.

Researchers discovered zircon crystals in Easter Island sediments that are up to 165 million years old, much older than the island’s own volcanic rocks aged to 2.5 million years and its underlying seafloor formed 3 to 4.8 million years ago. These zircons show geochemical signatures typical of deep mantle plume activity.

== See also ==
- Easter Island § Geology
- Moai (seamount)
