= José Salas Valdés =

Spanish sailor

José Salas Valdés was a Spanish sailor of the late 18th century. He was an explorer of the Americas and Pacific. In 1793 he set out on a voyage of the South Pacific. He is credited with discovering Isla Salas y Gómez about 390 kilometres (240 mi) to the northeast of Easter Island on 23 August 1793.
