= Salas y Gómez Island =

Uninhabited Pacific island of Chile

Isla Salas y Gómez
Native name: Motu Motiro Hiva (Rapa Nui); or; Manu Motu Motiro Hiva (Rapa Nui)
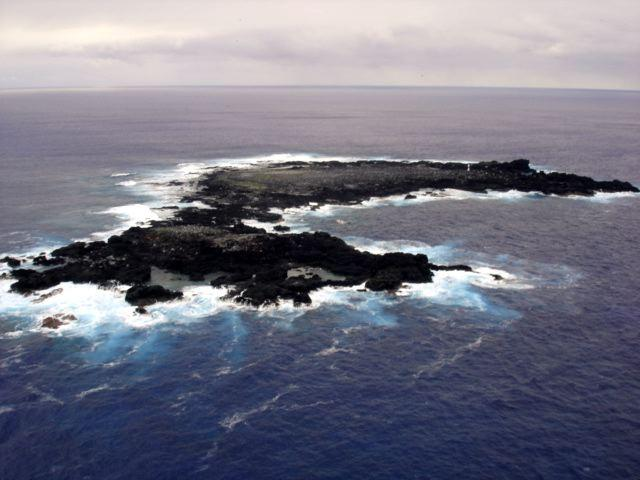
- Aerial view of Salas y Gómez in March 2000, looking east

- Location within Pacific Ocean

Geography
- Location: Pacific Ocean
- Total islands: 1
- Area: 0.15 km^{2} (0.058 sq mi)
- Highest elevation: 30 m (100 ft)

Administration
- Chile
- Region: Valparaíso
- Province: Isla de Pascua
- Commune: Isla de Pascua

Demographics
- Population: 0 (2024)
- Pop. density: 0/km^{2} (0/sq mi)

Additional information
- Time zone: Easter Island Standard Time (UTC-6)
  - Summer (DST): Easter Island Summer Time (UTC-5)

Isla Salas y Gómez (Spanish pronunciation: [ˈisla ˈsalas i ˈɣomes]), also known as Isla Sala y Gómez (Spanish pronunciation: [ˈisla ˈsalaj ˈɣomes]; Easter Island Motu Motiro Hiva Marine Park), is a small uninhabited Chilean island in the Pacific Ocean. It is sometimes considered the easternmost point in the Polynesian Triangle.

Isla Salas y Gómez and its surrounding waters are a Marine Protected Area called Parque Marino Salas y Gómez, with a surface area of 150,000 km^{2}. Throughout its history, the island has been largely untouched by humans, due to its diminutive size and remoteness.

== Geography ==
Isla Salas y Gómez is located 3,210 km west of the Chilean mainland, 2,490 km west of Chile's Desventuradas Islands, 3,226 km south of the Galápagos Islands and 391 km east-northeast of Easter Island, the closest landmass. Salas y Gómez consists of two rocks, a smaller one in the west measuring 4 hectares in area (270 meters north–south, 200 meters east–west), and a larger one in the east measuring 11 ha (500 meters north–south, 270 meters east–west), which are connected by a narrow isthmus in the north, averaging approximately 30 meters in width. The total area is approximately 15 hectares (0.15 km^{2}), and the total length northwest–southeast is 770 meters. Its highest point, 30 meters above sea level, is in the south of the eastern rock, less than 30 meters from the shore, above a 10 meter high cliff. The highest elevation on the western rock is 26 meters.

The island is showered with salt water, and the shoreline is dotted with countless tidepools. Because the shoreline consists primarily of cliffs, landing on the island is difficult in all but the calmest of conditions.

There are no permanent sources of fresh water on the island, but there is an intermittent rainwater pool in a depression on the eastern rock, which often forms a cache of fresh water 75 meters in diameter. This is essential for the survival of the large population of seabirds.

Even when this area appears dry at the surface, the sand is still moist just a few inches below the surface. This flat sandy area is also the only place on the island suitable for landing helicopters.

In 1994, the Chilean Navy installed an automated beacon and a tsunami warning system. The island has since been declared a nature sanctuary.

== History ==
=== Name ===
The Rapa Nui name for the island is Motu Motiro Hiva or Manu Motu Motiro Hiva, meaning "(Bird's) Islet on the way to Hiva". Hiva is part of the names of several Polynesian islands, particularly in the Marquesas Islands. In the Rapa Nui language, however, it means "far off lands" and is the name for the mythical original homeland of the Polynesians. From Easter Island, Salas y Gómez is almost the opposite direction to the Marquesas, and the next inhabited territory "behind" Salas y Gómez would be the coast of South America. This was one of the factors that led Thor Heyerdahl to theorize that there was pre-European contact between Polynesia and South America.

The current name, Salas y Gómez, is derived from the names of two of the first Spaniards to see the islands: José Salas Valdés, who sailed by the island on 23 August 1793, and José Manuel Gómez, who sailed by in the privateer frigate Victor in October 1805.. The island is sometimes referred to as "Isla Sala y Gómez", with "Sala" being a misunderstanding of Salas.

=== Human visitation ===
Although there is no evidence that the island has ever been permanently inhabited, Easter Islanders were certainly aware of its existence, as indicated by the pre-European name of the island. Tradition says that the island was occasionally visited to collect fledglings and eggs. The island was said to have been difficult to land upon, because the gods Make-make and Huau protected the seabirds from those who ate their eggs and offspring. Because of these historical connections to Easter Island, Salas y Gómez might be considered part of Polynesia; if so its location would make it the easternmost landmass of Polynesia. In his 1951 book Geography of the Pacific, author Otis M. Freeman did not consider Salas y Gómez to be part of Polynesia despite its proximity to Easter Island, since it was discovered uninhabited. He instead grouped it with oceanic islands closer to the Americas, including Clipperton Island, Cocos Island, the Desventuradas Islands, the Galápagos Islands, Guadalupe Island, the Juan Fernández Islands, Malpelo Island and the Revillagigedo Islands, as these islands were also discovered uninhabited by Europeans.

The first European to sight the island was José Salas Valdés, a Spanish sailor, in August 1793.

=== Political situation ===
Salas y Gómez was claimed by Chile in 1888, and was administered by the Chilean Navy. Beginning 1 March 1966, the island was included in the department of Isla de Pascua. On 25 July 1974, the department was reorganized as the Easter Island Province.

=== Marine Protected Area ===
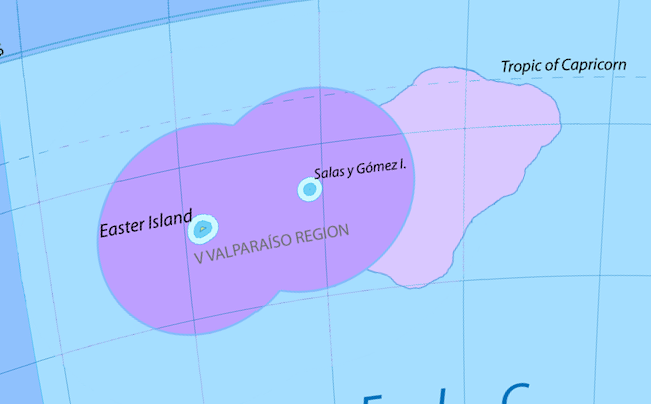
Easter Island or Rapa Nui and Salas y Gómez Island, Chile, its territorial waters and extended continental shelf. Exclusive Economic Zone and Continental Shelf Extended Continental Shelf

On October 6, 2010, President Sebastián Piñera announced the creation of the 150,000 km^{2} Marine Protected Area Parque Marino Sala y Gómez, also called Parque Marino Motu Motiro Hiva.

During the 2008 Deepsea Coral Symposium, Wellington, the idea of a Marine Protected Area on the submarine ridges of Salas y Gomez and Nazca was launched for the very first time. Then, in February 2009, the World Wildlife Fund, WWF Chile, published a scientific revision in the Latin American Journal of Aquatic Research, giving the scientific background that supported the government report for the declaration of the non-take MPA Motu Motiro Hiva.

This declaration follows the efforts of Oceana and National Geographic to both study and highlight the ecological value of this area, and to encourage its protection. These organizations are planning additional expeditions to the area in order to draft a conservation plan, and to propose the widening of the protected area to encompass the whole Exclusive Economic Zone around the island.

== Geology ==
Salas y Gómez is a volcanic island consisting of the summit of a large mountain which rises about 3500 metres from the sea bed. Scott Reef (not to be confused with Scott Reefs off Western Australia), 1.5 km further northeast, is another peak of the same mostly submarine mountain, and has a least depth of 25 meters above it. Salas y Gómez is part of the same Salas y Gómez Ridge as Easter Island to the west, these two locations being the only places where the otherwise submarine mountain range extends above sea level. There are several dozen more seamounts in the range, which extends 2232 km eastward until Nazca Seamount at 23°36′S 83°30′W, where it joins the Nazca Ridge.

Salas y Gómez is the fourth youngest mountain in the chain, which is being formed by the Nazca Plate floating over the Easter hotspot. The two youngest mountains in the chain, Pukao and Moai, are seamounts to the west of Easter Island.

== Flora ==
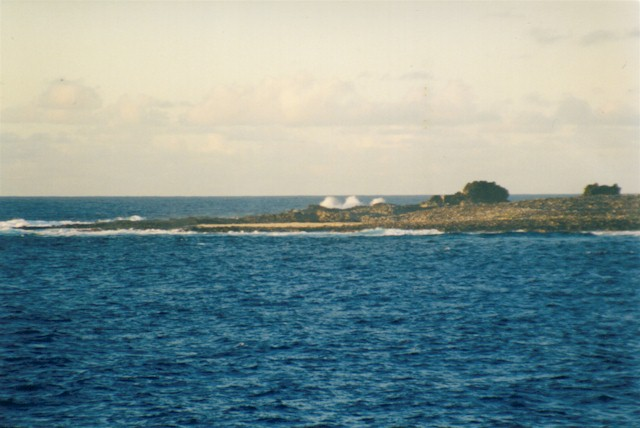
View of Salas y Gómez in April 1999

Salas y Gómez and Easter Island form a distinct ecoregion, the Rapa Nui subtropical broadleaf forests. However Salas y Gómez is largely barren with no forests and only four species of terrestrial plants; these include Asplenium obtusatum ("spleenwort"), a type of fern which only grows in protected areas at higher elevations.

== Fauna ==
Besides a number of insect species, the only non-aquatic fauna are about a dozen species of seabird, which use the island as a rookery, with the estimated number of adult birds in 1985 (Harrison and Jehl, 1988):

Species (Polynesian name)	Scientific name	Adult birds in 1985
Christmas shearwater	Puffinus nativitatis	5,000
Masked booby (Manukena)	Sula dactylatra	3,000
Brown noddy	Anous stolidus	1,400
Great frigatebird (Makohe)	Fregata minor	700
Sooty tern	Onychoprion fuscata	200
Blue noddy	Procelsterna cerulea	80
Red-tailed tropicbird (Tevake)	Phaëthon rubricauda	30
Polynesian (white-throated) storm petrel	Nesofregetta fuliginosa	2
White tern	Gygis alba	2
Red-footed booby	Sula sula	2
Black noddy	Anous minutus	2
Grey noddy	Procelsterna albivitta	1

Those numbers may vary considerably from year to year, due to weather conditions, and it has been observed that the overall numbers were much lower in 1986.

Marine fauna includes a large number of littoral crustaceans, echinoidea, etc., as well as a large assortment of reef fishes and a number of species of shark, which swimmers report to be "curious", but not aggressive. The lacks of studies has resulted in poor understandings of oceanic fauna of Easter Island and waters in vicinity. However possibilities of undiscovered breeding grounds for humpback, southern blue and pygmy blue whales including Isla Salas y Gómez and the Easter Island have been considered.

== Cultural references ==
Charles Stephenson's book The Face of OO features the island, and the submerged rocks around it, heavily.

Alan Dean Foster referred to the island in his 1971 Cthulhu mythos short story "Some Notes Concerning a Green Box".

Although only passing Salas y Gomez in 1816 and not going ashore, the German poet Adelbert von Chamisso wrote a poem based on his reflections upon the island.

== See also ==
- Desert island
- San Félix y San Ambrosio
