= Herald Shoal =

Coordinates: 70.1941°N 171.1758°W

Herald Shoal is a region of high benthic productivity on the Chukchi Sea shelf. It serves as rich foraging habitat for many species of marine mammals and birds.

== Geography ==
Herald Shoal is approximately 50 meters deep in most places. The shoal diverts warm water flowing northward from the Bering Sea and holds colder water long into the summer season, which allows sea ice to persist in this area longer. Herald Shoal is no longer covered by continuous pack ice, but along with Hanna Shoal, has some of the most reliable ice present on the entire Chukchi shelf.

== Fauna ==
Herald Shoal has relatively colder, saltier, and more nutrient rich water compared to more easterly water, and during the spring ice retreat this region experiences high primary productivity from phytoplankton blooms. This leads to the region's rich seafloor, making it a significant food resource for many marine species.

In early to mid-summer, Herald Shoal has a high-concentration of walrus that are either migrating through the region or foraging for food. Beluga whales have been observed concentrating around the Shoal in the fall before they migrate southward into the Bering Sea.

== Importance ==
Like Hanna Shoal, Herald Shoal is likely to be important as ocean conditions change. Identified as an important area by scientists, Herald shoal will likely provide ecosystem resilience to climate change due to the unique characteristics of the region that makes it so productive.
