= Continental shelf of Russia =

Continental shelf adjacent to the Russian Federation

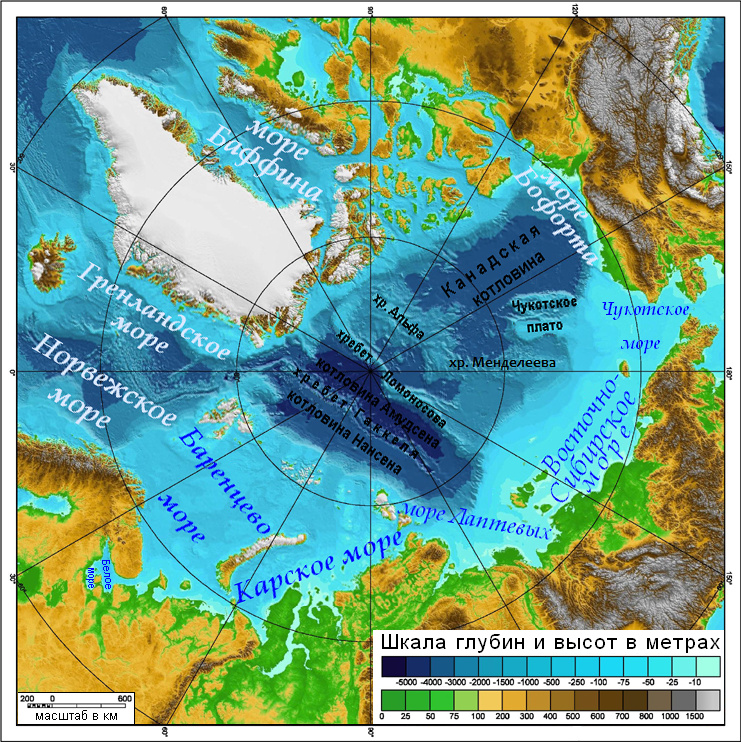
Relief of the Arctic Ocean floor

The continental shelf of Russia or the Russian continental shelf is the continental shelf adjacent to the Russian Federation. Geologically, the extent of the shelf is defined as the entirety of the continental shelves adjacent to Russia's coasts. In international law, however, the United Nations Convention on the Law of the Sea more narrowly defines the extent of the shelf as the seabed and subsoil of the submarine areas over which a state exercises sovereign rights.

The Siberian Shelf in the Arctic Ocean is the largest (and least explored) of the Russian shelves, a region of strategic importance because of its oil and natural gas reserves. Other parts of the Russian shelf are typically named after the corresponding seas: Barents Shelf (Barents Sea Shelf), Chukchi Shelf (Chukchi Sea Shelf), etc. With the exception of internal Russian seas, these geological shelves are shared with other countries which share the corresponding seas. For example, the Chukchi Shelf is shared between Russia and the United States according to the 1990 USA-USSR maritime boundary.

== 2001 extension claim ==
On 20 December 2001, Russia made an official submission into the UN Commission on the Limits of the Continental Shelf in accordance with the United Nations Convention on the Law of the Sea (article 76, paragraph 8). In the document it is proposed to establish new outer limits of the continental shelf of Russia beyond the previous 200 nautical mile zone (370 km), but within the Russian Arctic sector. The territory claimed by Russia in the submission is a large portion of the Arctic within Russia's sector and extending to the North Pole. One of the arguments was a statement that eastern portion of the Lomonosov Ridge, an underwater mountain ridge extending across the polar basin, and the Mendeleev Ridge are extensions of the Eurasian continent. In 2002, the UN Commission requested that Russia submit additional scientific evidence in support of its claim.

=== Additional research ===
Additional research for the Russian claim was planned over 2007–2008 as part of the Russian program for the International Polar Year. The program investigated the structure and evolution of the Earth's crust in the Arctic regions neighbouring Eurasia, such as the regions of Mendeleev Ridge, Alpha Ridge, and Lomonosov Ridge, to discover whether they were linked with the Siberian shelf. Major means of research during the expedition were the Akademik Fedorov research ship, the Russia nuclear icebreaker with two helicopters and geological probe devices, and Il-18 aircraft with gravimetric devices.

In June 2007, a group of 50 Russian scientists returned from a six-week expedition on the Russia with the news that the Lomonosov Ridge was linked to Russian Federation territory, supporting Russia's claim over the oil-and-gas rich triangle. The territory contained 10 billion tonnes of gas and oil deposits, the scientists said. Russian President Vladimir Putin then used this information to restate the 2001 Russian claim.

On 2 August 2007, Russian explorers in a submersible planted the national flag on the seabed below the North Pole in symbolic support of the 2001 claim. A mechanical arm dropped a specially made rust-proof titanium flag onto the Arctic seabed at a depth of 4,261 metres (13,980 ft).

=== International reaction ===
In response to Russia's planting the national flag on the seabed at the North Pole, Canadian Foreign Minister Peter MacKay said, "This isn't the 15th century. You can't go around the world and just plant flags and say 'We're claiming this territory'". In response to these words the Foreign Minister of the Russian Federation Sergey Lavrov stated: "I was amazed by my Canadian counterpart's statement that we are planting flags around. We’re not throwing flags around. We just do what other discoverers did. The purpose of the expedition is not to stake whatever rights of Russia, but to prove that our shelf extends to the North Pole and beyond".

=== Research results ===
In mid-September 2007, Russia's Natural Resources Ministry issued a statement:

Preliminary results of an analysis of the earth crust model examined by the Arktika 2007 expedition, obtained on 20 September, have confirmed that the crust structure of the Lomonosov Ridge corresponds to the world analogues of the continental crust, and it is therefore part of the Russian Federation's adjacent continental shelf.

On 4 August 2015, Russia submitted additional data in support of its bid, containing new arguments based on "ample scientific data collected in years of Arctic research", for territories in the Arctic to the United Nations. Through this bid, Russia is claiming 1.2 million square kilometers (over 463,000 square miles) of Arctic sea shelf extending more than 350 nautical miles (about 650 kilometers) from the shore.

On 9 February 2016, Russia formally submitted to the United Nations a revised application with substantiated evidence of shelf claims to the Arctic Ocean seabed, including an area under the North Pole.

The evidential base of this application includes geology and geophysics evidence from nine Russian scientific expeditions. They were launched by Ministry of natural resources and environmental protection in cooperation with the Ministry of Defence and Russian Academy of Sciences. The expeditions were performed by scientific icebreakers and submarines. Moreover, a geological office has conducted acquisitions of bathymetric multibeam sounder, integrated seismic exploration, airborne geophysical measurements and geological sampling of the main Amerasian and Eurasian basins' structures. During the work researchers used a unique technology, specially designed for difficult ice conditions. The icebreaking research vessel Akademik Fedorov was refitted specifically for seismic operations in ice thickness up to three meters.

The justification of Russian claim is confirmed by the continuity of the sedimentary magnitude, elements of basal complex, as well as the overall continuity and consistency of the deep layers of the earth's crust and the absence of strike-slip transverse faults at the junction of the Lomonosov Ridge and the Eurasian continent.

All collected data show the continental character of the Lomonosov Ridge, the Mendeleev-Alfa High, the Chukotka Plateau, as well as the continuous extension of these elements from the shallow Eurasian shelf.

On August 9, 2016, all of this evidence were presented in New York at the 41st session of the UN Commission on the Limits of the Continental Shelf (CLCS).

== See also ==
- Arctic policy of Russia
- Energy policy of Russia
- Extended Continental Shelf
- Outer Continental Shelf
- List of Russian explorers
- Maritime boundary
- Continental shelf of the United States
- Continental shelf of Chile
