= USCGC Healy =

Icebreaker of the US Coast Guard

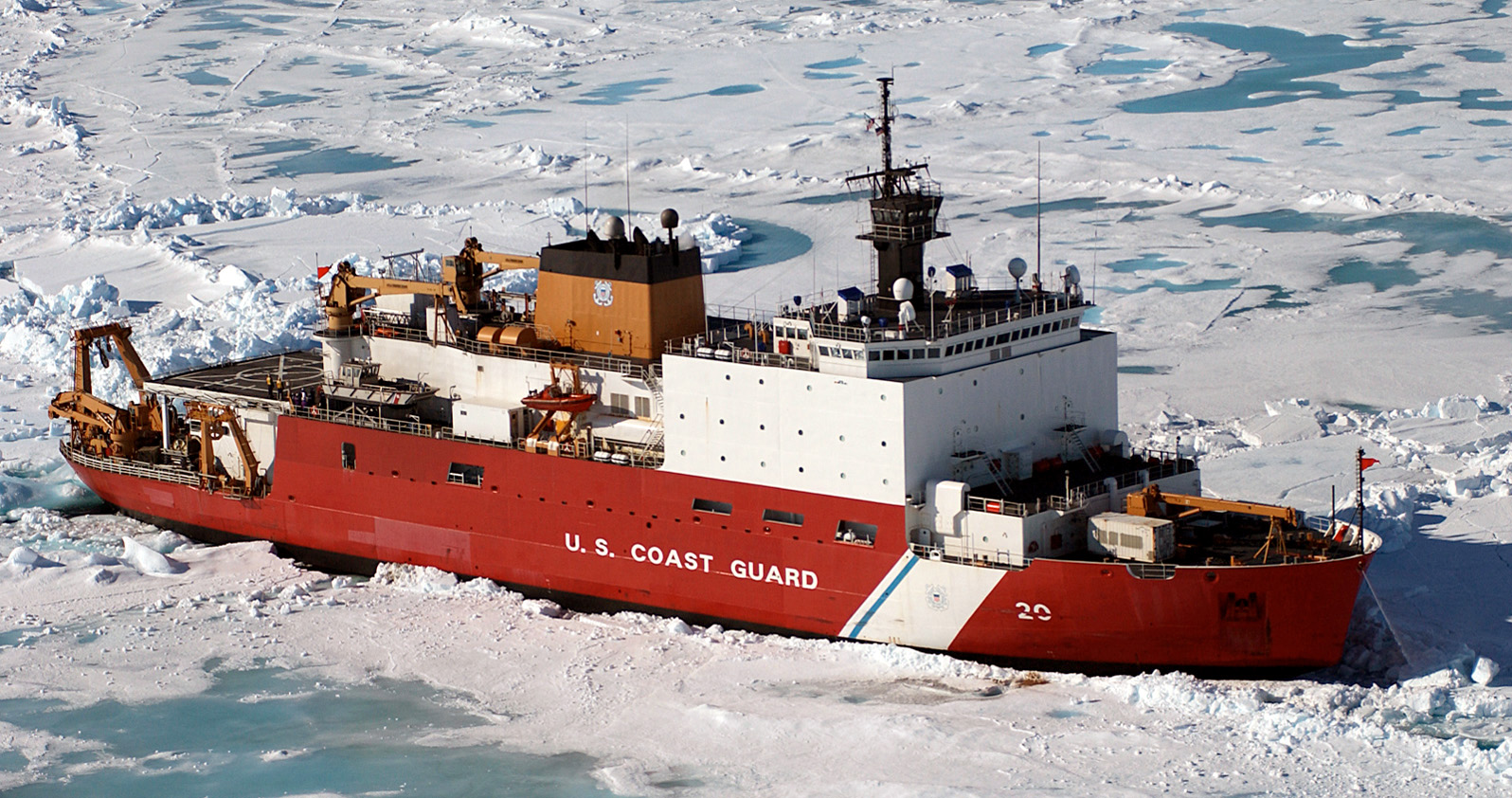
- USCGC Healy (WAGB-20) north of Alaska

History

United States
- Name: Healy
- Namesake: Michael A. Healy
- Builder: Avondale Shipyard
- Laid down: 16 September 1996
- Launched: 15 November 1997
- Commissioned: 10 November 1999
- Identification: IMO number: 9083380; MMSI number: 303902000; Callsign: NEPP
- Motto: Promise and Deliver
- Status: In service
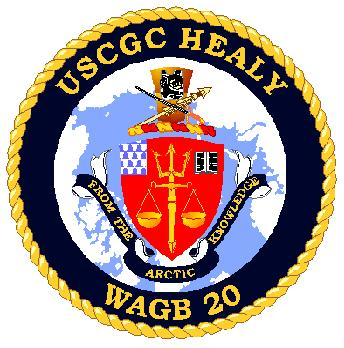
- Badge: Crest of the USCGC Healy

General characteristics
- Type: Medium icebreaker (USCG)
- Displacement: 16,000 long tons (16,257 t)
- Length: 420 ft (128 m)
- Beam: 82 ft (25 m)
- Draft: 29 ft 3 in (8.92 m)
- Installed power: 4 × Sulzer 12ZAV40S; 34,560 kW (46,350 hp) (combined)
- Propulsion: Diesel-electric (AC/AC); Two shafts (2 × 11.2 MW (15,000 hp))
- Speed: 17 knots (31 km/h; 20 mph) (maximum); 14 knots (26 km/h; 16 mph) (cruising); 3 knots (5.6 km/h; 3.5 mph) in 4.5 ft (1.4 m) ice
- Complement: 19 officers; 12 CPO; 54 enlisted; 51 scientists
- Aircraft carried: 1999–2005: 2 × HH-65B Dolphin helicopters.; 2005–present: Helicopter support by a National Science Foundation contractor.
- Notes: 5 laboratories: Main Lab, Wet Lab, Bio-Chem Lab, Electronics Lab, Meteorological Lab

USCGC Healy (WAGB-20) is the United States' largest and most technologically advanced icebreaker as well as the US Coast Guard's largest vessel. She is classified as a medium icebreaker by the Coast Guard. She is homeported in Seattle, Washington, and was commissioned in 1999. On 6 September 2001 Healy visited the North Pole for the first time. The second visit occurred on 12 September 2005. On 5 September 2015, Healy became the first unaccompanied United States surface vessel to reach the North Pole, and Healy's fourth Pole visit (and her second unaccompanied visit) happened on 30 September 2022.

== Construction ==
Healy was built by Avondale Industries in New Orleans, Louisiana. The construction included a technology transfer agreement between Avondale Industries and the Finnish Kværner Masa-Yards Arctic Technology Centre, where the latter provided expertise for hull form development and propulsion line engineering based on the Finnish diesel-electric icebreaker Otso.

Healy is named in honor of United States Revenue Cutter Service Captain Michael A. Healy. Her keel was laid on 16 September 1996. Healy joined the icebreakers Polar Star and Polar Sea in their homeport of Seattle, on 10 November 1999. The ship departed New Orleans, on 26 January 2000, performing sea trials off of San Juan, Puerto Rico, and in Baffin Bay, between Canada and Greenland. She arrived in Seattle on 9 August 2000, after transiting the famed Northwest Passage and was placed "In Commission, Active" on 21 August 2000.

== Design ==
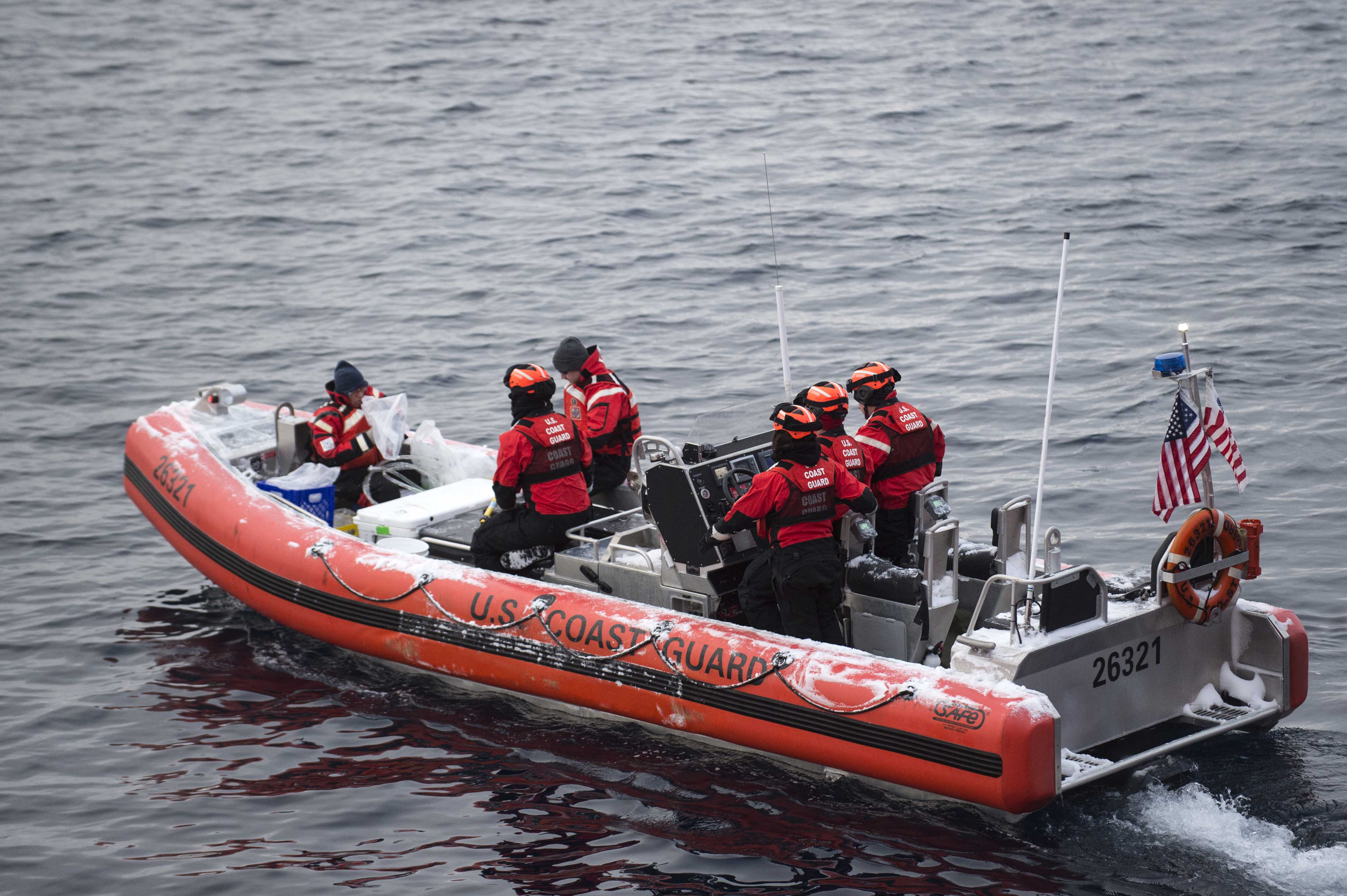
Healy's small boat 26321 conducts science operations gathering water samples in the Arctic Ocean during Arctic West Summer 2015.

Healy is an optimally manned vessel, meaning she has the minimum number of personnel staffed in order to safely navigate. Due to the vast array of missions conducted by Healy, it is vital that crew members are fully qualified on a number of duties. Healy operates two A-Frames, one on the aft working deck and one on the starboard side. There are two articulated cranes on the aft working deck, with the starboard side rated to 15 short tons (14 t) and the port side rated to 5 short tons (4.5 t). The aft working deck provides ample space to conduct science and research operations. Healy has a forecastle crane with a load capacity of 3 short tons (2.7 t), and two 04 level cranes with load capacities of 15 tons each. Healy has a Dynamic Positioning System (DPS) that uses her 2200-horsepower Omnithruster Bow Thruster system, which aids in navigation and station keeping during science operations. Her flight deck is capable of landing both of the Coast Guard's helicopter airframes, and her hangar can house 2 Eurocopter HH-65 Dolphin helicopters. Healy can accommodate 8 ISO vans on the ship, which are used as science labs and workstations. Healy has three small boats on board. One is the 38 ft (12 m) Arctic Survey Boat (ASB), which is on the starboard side. Healy has two 26 ft (7.9 m) Cutter Boat Large (CBL) rigid-hull inflatable boat (RHIB), one on each side.

== Capabilities ==
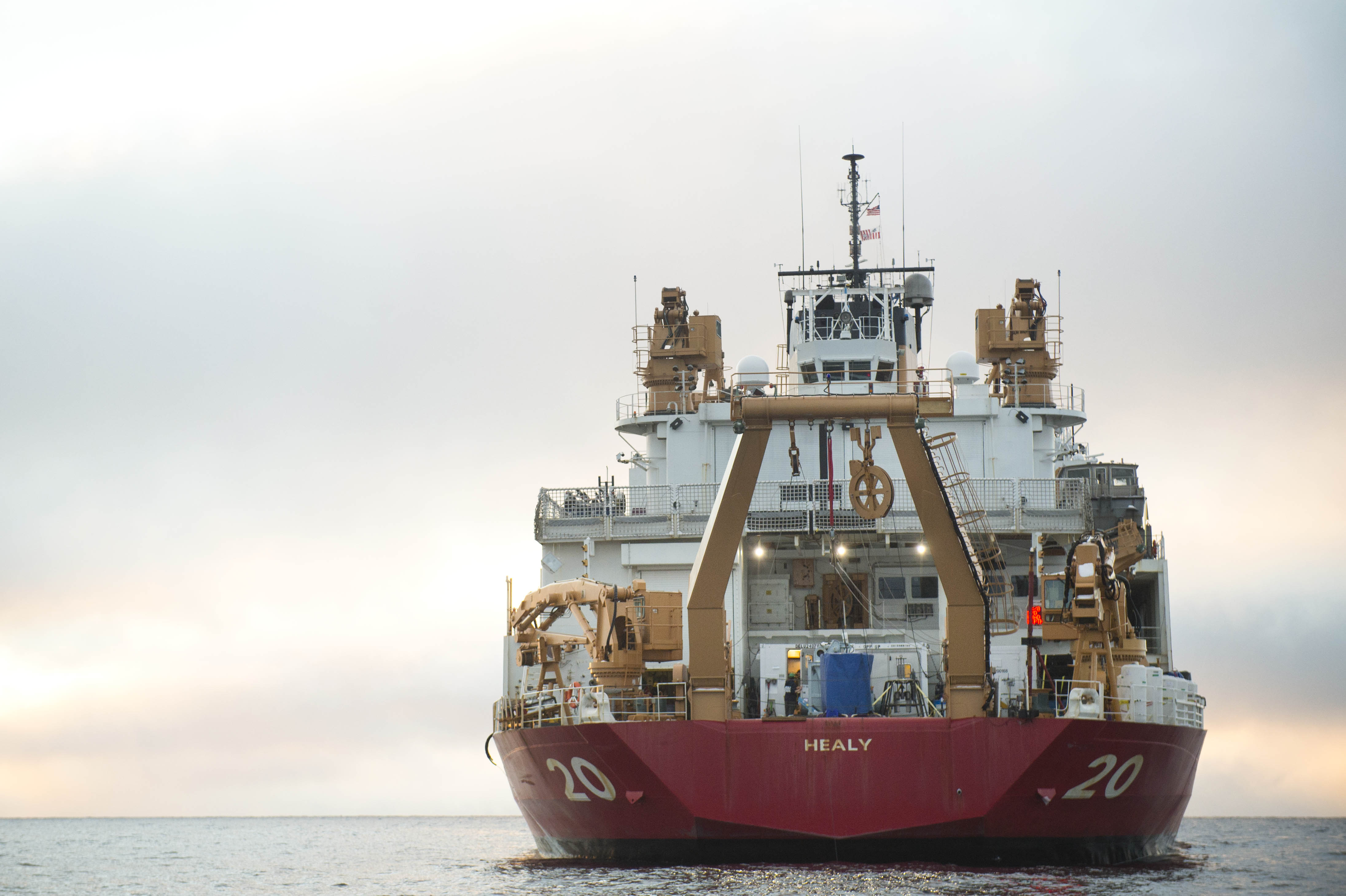
An aft view of Healy and her A-frame while deployed in the Arctic.

Designed to conduct a wide range of research activities, Healy provides more than 4,200 square feet (390 m^{2}) of scientific laboratory space, numerous electronic sensor systems, oceanographic winches, and accommodations for up to 50 scientists. Healy is also designed to break 4.5 ft (1.4 m) of ice continuously at 3 knots (5.6 km/h; 3.5 mph) or ice 10 ft (3.0 m) thick when backing and ramming, and can operate in temperatures as low as −50 °F (−46 °C).

As a Coast Guard cutter, Healy is also a platform for supporting other potential missions in the polar regions, including: search and rescue, ship escort, environmental protection, and law enforcement.

== Notable operations ==
6 September 2001: Healy, on her three-phase maiden voyage, became only the second U.S. surface ship to reach the North Pole as a part of the Arctic East Science Mission, accompanied by the German research icebreaker Polarstern. Healy returned to her homeport, Seattle, on 20 December 2001 after 192 days at sea, which were punctuated by two port calls in Tromsø, Norway to exchange science teams. The second phase of the voyage, in Arctic ice, included testing of an autonomous underwater vehicle (UAV).

23 January 2002: Healy received the Coast Guard Meritorious Unit Commendation award for meritorious service from 12 June 2001 to 21 December 2001, during the Arctic East 2001 Science Mission. Healy mapped 1,100 nmi (2,000 km; 1,300 mi) of the Gakkel Ridge, previously the only unmapped undersea ridge in the world. Twelve previously unknown volcanoes and numerous undersea hydrothermal vents were discovered. Eight short tons (7.3 t) of rock samples were taken from over 100 deep sea dredges.

7 May 2003: Healy received the Coast Guard Unit Commendation award for exceptionally meritorious service from January 2003 to April 2003, while conducting Operation Deep Freeze in support of the U.S. Antarctic Program. With less than three weeks' notice, Healy was deployed to Antarctica in support of the critical annual re-supply of McMurdo Station. Healy played an instrumental role in coordination with Polar Sea in resupplying the ice station. Healy successfully escorted the freighter American Tern and the tanker Richard G. Matthieson. Healy successfully escorted both ships in and out of the ice, and facilitated the delivery of resources to McMurdo Station.

12 September 2005: Healy reached the North Pole for a second time, accompanied by the Swedish icebreaker Oden (1988 icebreaker). This was Healy's second visit to the North Pole, and the voyage was a part of the Arctic East-West Summer 2005 project which consisted of three cruises between 1 June and 28 November 2005.

16 July 2008: Healy received the Coast Guard Coast Guard Meritorious Unit Commendation award for meritorious service from April 2007 to July 2008, while conducting science operations in support of national scientific, economic, and political interests. Healy conducted a multi-year project in order to evaluate the entire ecosystem of the Bering Sea. Data collected during these missions helped improve the understanding of food webs and biological communities in the Arctic. Through superior mission execution in adverse weather, Healy exceeded expectations significantly.

20 January 2010: Healy received the Coast Guard Coast Guard Meritorious Unit Commendation award for meritorious service from 6 August to 16 September 2009, while conducting the Joint U.S.–Canada United Nations Convention on the Law of the Sea Extended Continental Shelf Mapping Expedition. In collaboration with CCGS Louis S. St-Laurent, Healy pushed 150 nmi (280 km; 170 mi) further north than planned and avoided $2.4 million in future expedition mapping costs. Healy also acquired over 1,000 lb (450 kg) of valuable geological samples by conducting dredging operations at depths of up to three mi (4.8 km). The rare samples were essential in establishing the origin of the targeted extended continental shelf.

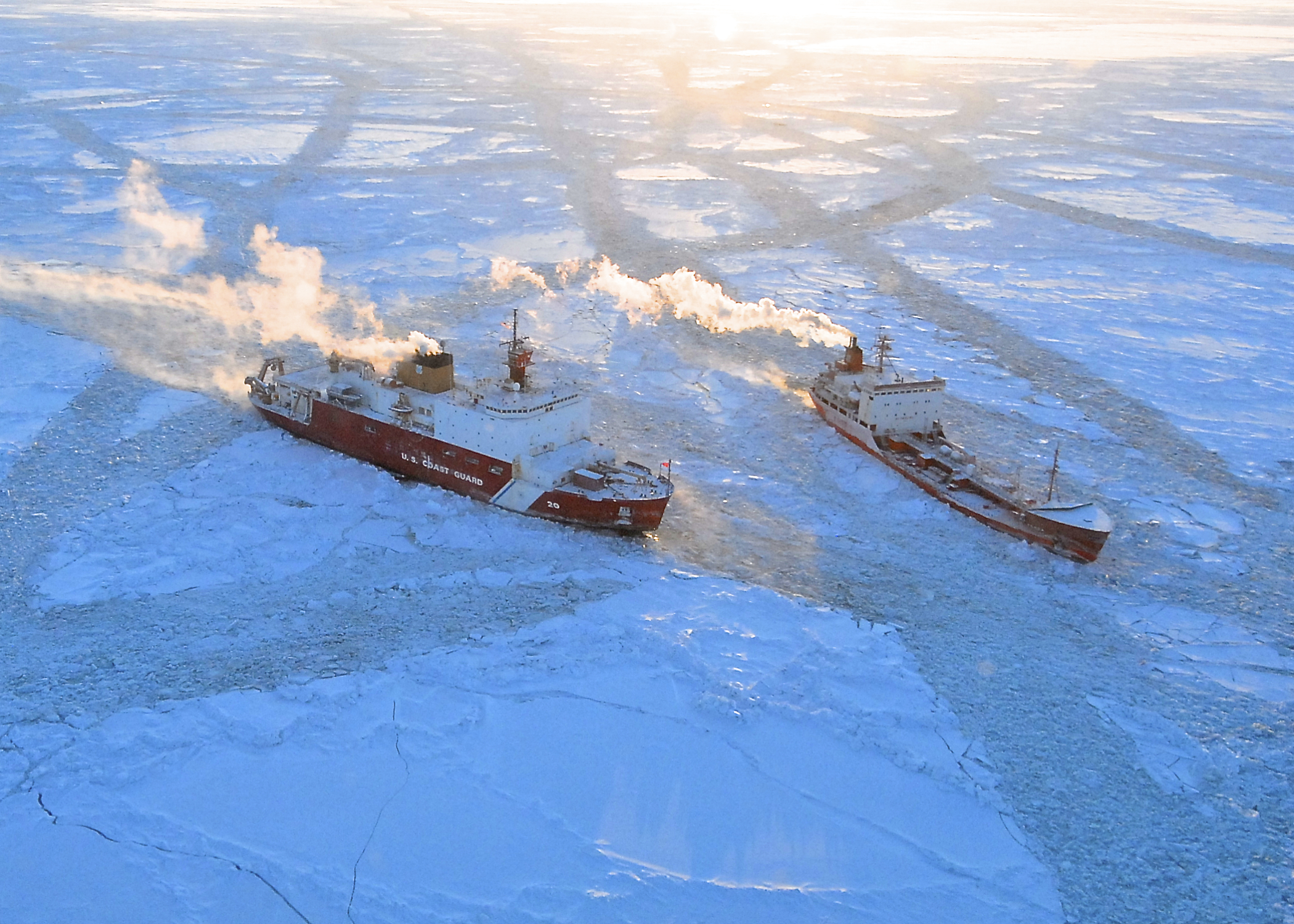
Healy escorts Renda through ice in the Bering Sea in January 2012.

3 January 2012: Healy escorted the Russian-flagged freighter Renda through pack ice to deliver an emergency supply of fuel to Nome, Alaska. In November 2011, a strong winter storm struck western Alaska, which prevented a vital fuel delivery to Nome. Such a winter delivery had never been attempted before because the ice floes are 1 to 5 feet (0.30 to 1.52 m) thick during the winter season. Healy delayed her return home from a six-month Arctic deployment in order to escort Renda through over 300 nmi (560 km; 350 mi) of extremely difficult ice conditions and broke out the beset ship time after time. After many days of great exertion, Renda transferred the fuel to Nome over the course of three days. On 20 January, Healy began the break out for herself and Renda. They emerged from the ice on 29 January 2012, after successful completion of the mission. The resupply was vital to the city, and was the first-ever winter fuel delivery from the water in Western Alaska. Over the course of Arctic West Summer 2012 (AWS12), Healy travelled over 18,000 nmi (33,000 km; 21,000 mi) and conducted 687 science casts. Healy also added 25% more data to the bathymetric mapping project of the extended continental shelf through multibeam sonar bottom-mapping. This data was collected in support of the delineation of the American and Canadian continental shelves. On April 10th, Healy was awarded the Coast Guard Unit Commendation award for exceptionally meritorious service from 3 January to 5 February 2012.

29 October 2015: Healy received the Coast Guard Unit Commendation award for exceptionally meritorious service from 24 June to 29 October 2015, during their Arctic West Summer 2015 deployment. Healy traveled over 16,000 nmi (30,000 km; 18,000 mi), took over 25,000 water and ice samples from 72 science stations, and became the first unaccompanied U.S. surface vessel to reach the North Pole. She also engaged with the crew of the German icebreaker Polarstern while at the North Pole, in support of the international scientific mission Geotraces. Finally, Healy became the first vessel to broadcast a live feed from ice-bound Arctic waters, streaming video of a search and rescue exercise to shore-based coordinators.

== Recent operations ==
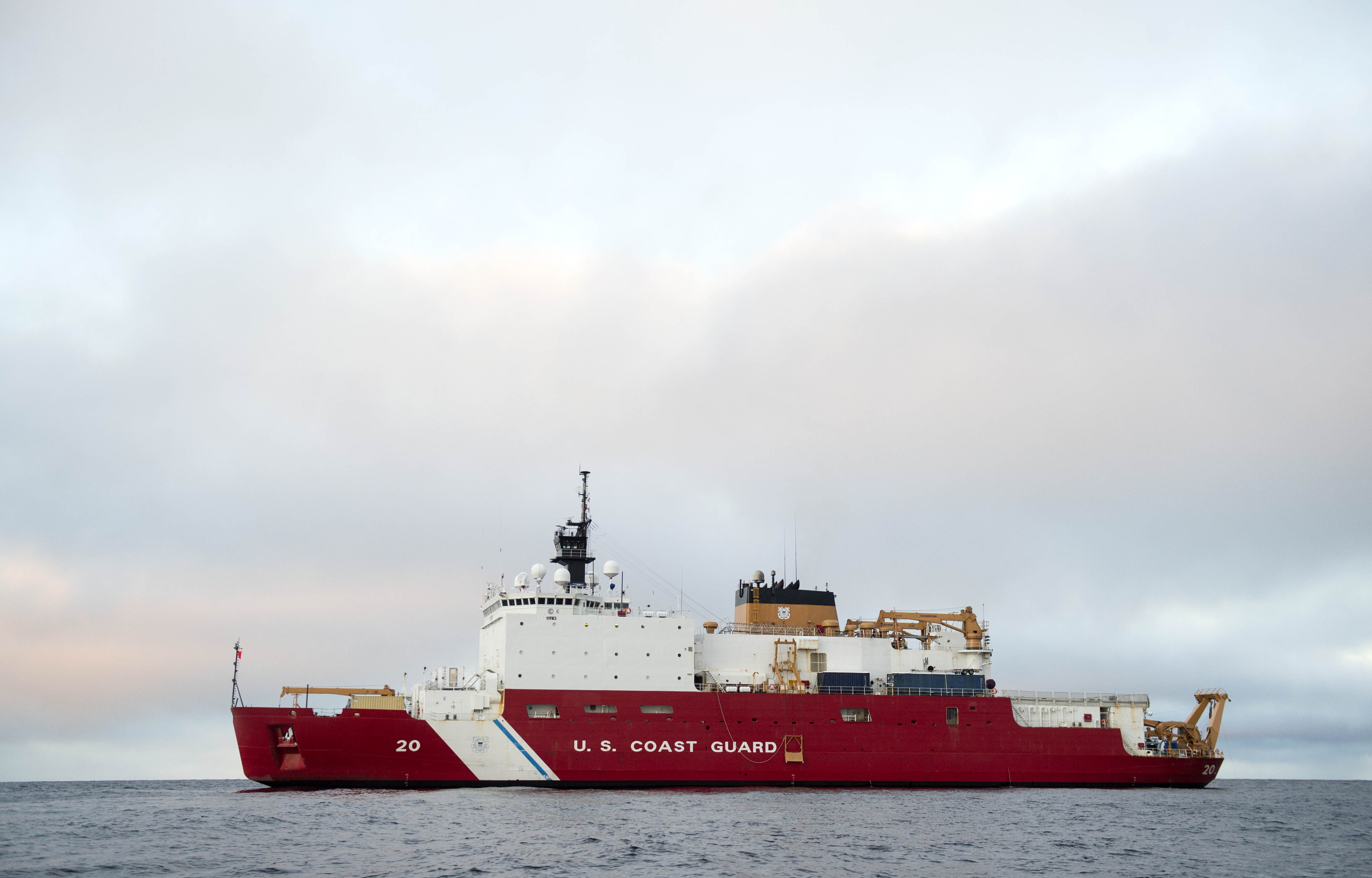
Healy underway in the Arctic Ocean.

2009: A marine biological mission aboard Healy studied the ecosystem of the Bering Sea, specifically the sea ice and its future affects on sea life population. The study included a number of biological focuses which recorded seabird and micro zooplankton populations, as well as assessing phytoplankton, sea ice algae, nitrogen, and sediment. Additionally Oceanographer Evelyn Lessard co-led a team to study krill populations to assess how climate change will affect the fisheries.

2011: During Arctic West Summer 2011 (AWS11), Healy collaborated with researchers from NASA to study the refractive properties of sunlight in the Arctic. Healy spent the summer mapping the Extended Continental Shelf in collaboration with CCGS Louis S. St-Laurent. A third mission of this patrol studied organic carbon and its levels in the Arctic water column. This data was used to explain bacteria distribution in the water column as well as carbon dioxide and biomass cycles.

2013: Arctic West Summer 2013 (AWS13) consisted of four different missions for Healy, over which more than 19,000 nmi (35,000 km; 22,000 mi) were covered. The first mission utilized Healy's unique over-the-side science capabilities in order to collect organisms and create an ecological picture of the Hanna Shoal region. The second mission yielded sediment samples from the Mackenzie River Basin through the use of coring devices. For the third mission the Coast Guard Research Development Center, in coordination with the National Oceanic and Atmospheric Administration, deployed numerous equipment for testing and development. The fourth and final mission deployed subsurface moorings and conducted numerous CTD tests to study the Alaskan Boundary Current. A group of researchers from the Naval Submarine Medical Research Laboratory tested their Submarine Team Behaviors Tool with Healy's crew in September 2013. They were part of the 50 person science team from the USCG Research and Development Center that evaluated technology for the recovery of "simulated oil trapped in or under ice at the polar ice edge".

2014: A main area of focus during Arctic West Summer 2014 (AWS14) was the study of phytoplankton blooms along the Chukchi Sea. Healy also worked in conjunction with the United States Coast Guard Research and Development Center to test Aerostat balloons, UAV, Autonomous Underwater Vehicles (AUV), Remotely Operated Vehicles (ROV), and oil tracking buoys.

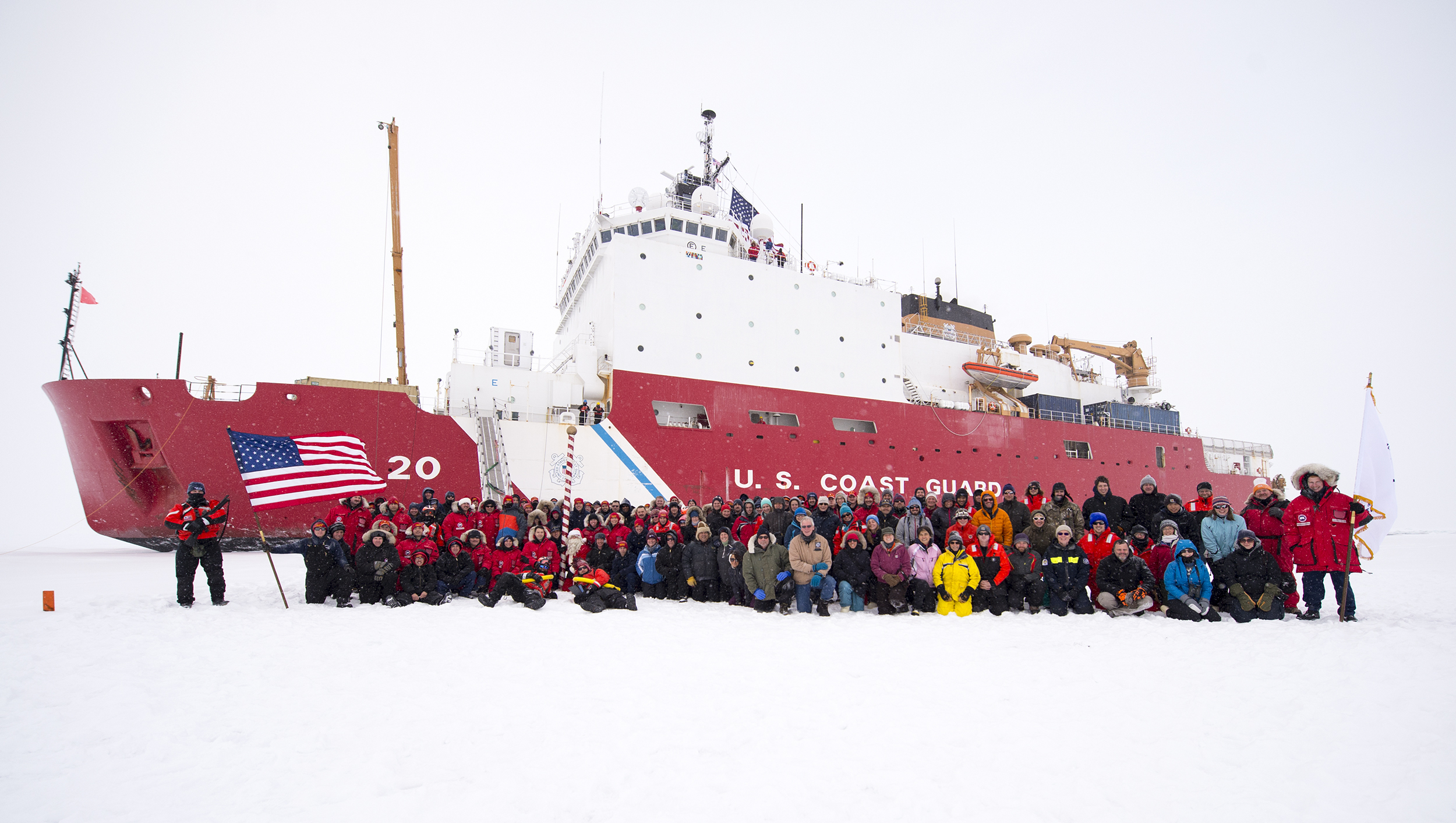
Healy and the Geotraces science team have their portrait taken at the North Pole Sept. 7, 2015. Healy reached the pole on 5 September, becoming the first U.S. surface vessel to do so unaccompanied.

2015: On 5 September, Healy became the first unaccompanied United States surface vessel to reach the North Pole. Healy travelled over 16,000 nautical miles during Arctic West Summer 2015 (AWS15). During this expedition, more than 25,000 water and ice samples from 72 science stations were collected through Conductivity, Temperature, Depth (CTD) casts and on-ice science stations. Healy worked with both the United States Coast Guard Research & Development Center and the National Oceanic and Atmospheric Administration to test and develop Unmanned Aerial Vehicles (UAV's), and became the first vessel to broadcast a live feed from Arctic waters. Healy also conducted a professional international engagement with the German Icebreaker Polarstern at the North Pole. It was a historic Arctic deployment that displayed the Coast Guard's unique polar capabilities to the public and the world. Between May and October 2015, Healy also tested the Mobile User Objective System (MUOS) high frequency satellite communication system throughout her Arctic Summer West 2015 mission. Successful tests were completed throughout the expedition during the transit to the North Pole.

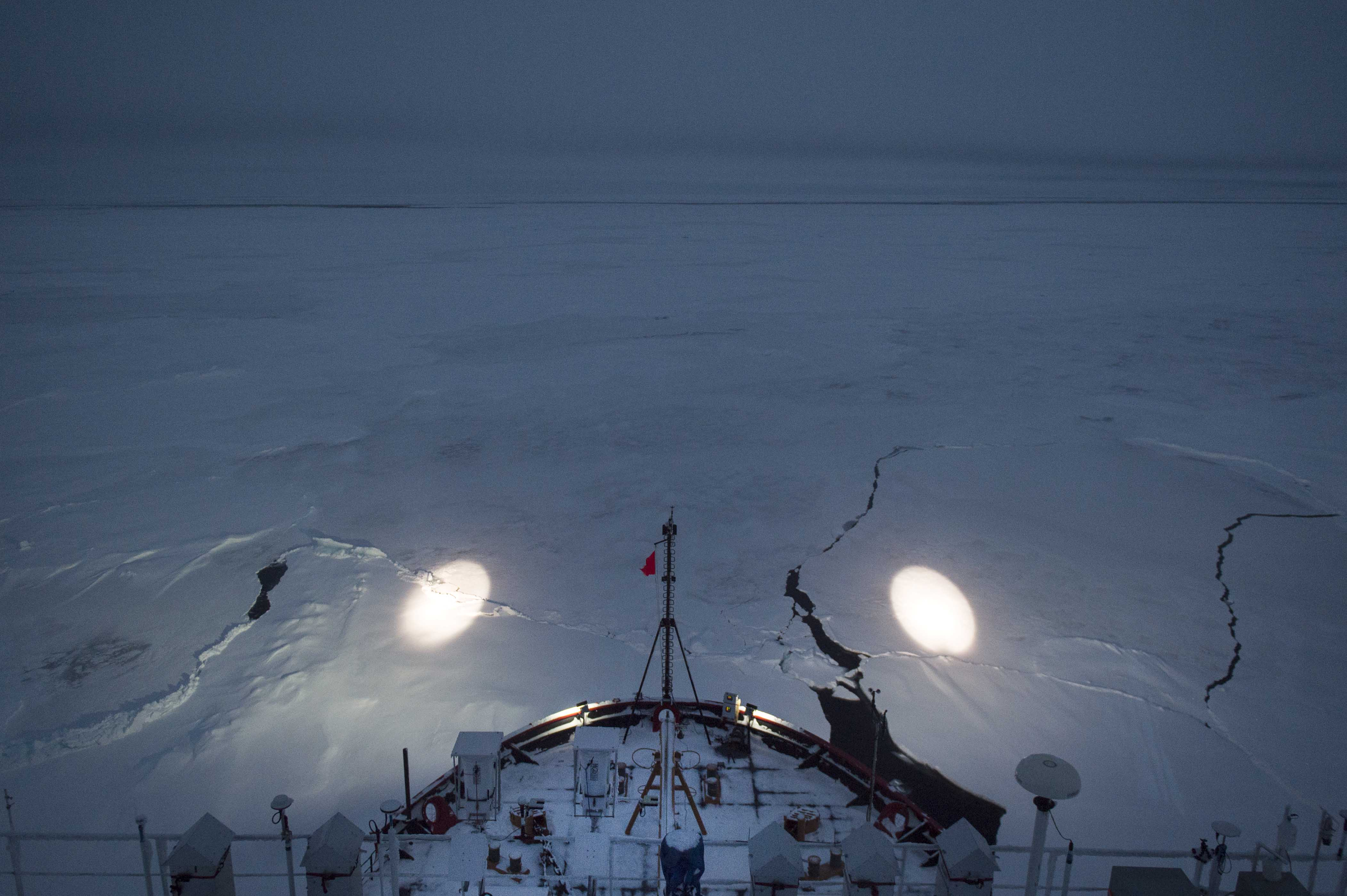
Healy amid the ice at night in the Arctic Ocean.

2016: On 15 October 2016, Healy returned to her home port in Seattle, after a 127-day summer deployment in the Arctic Ocean. The crew of Healy, and her accompanying scientists, participated in three scientific studies. Highlights of this deployment include the discovery of new species of jellyfish in the Chukchi Sea, observations of the continental shelf in the Arctic Ocean and Bering Sea, and data collection on climate change.

2022: On 30 September 2022, Healy and crew reached the North Pole for her 4th time and her 2nd time unaccompanied. The crew assisted a team of NSF-funded scientists as part of the international Synoptic Arctic Survey Program (SAS). The 2022 voyage was facilitated by "unexpectedly" thin ice, multiple leads in the sea ice, and favorable South winds.

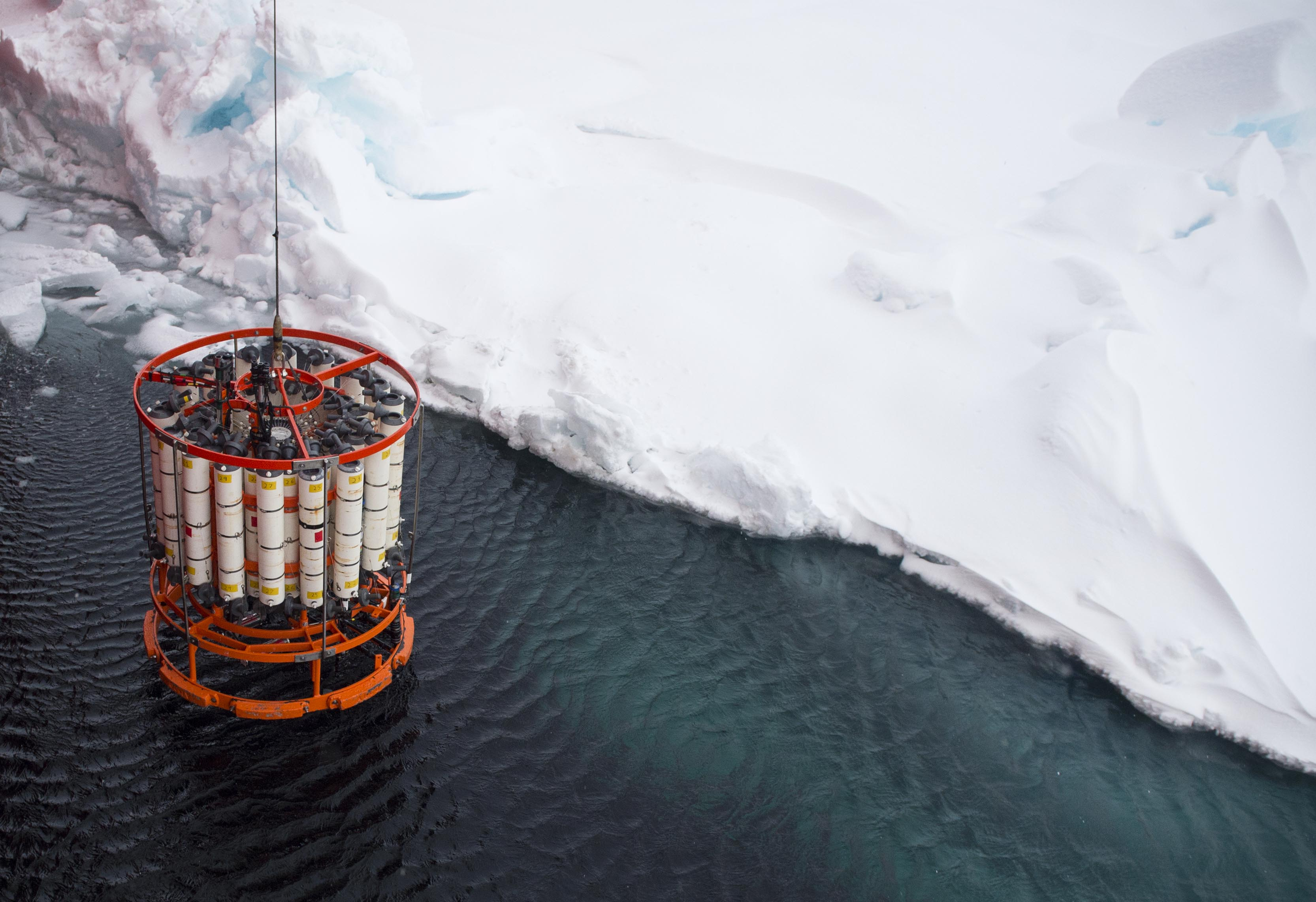
A CTD cast deployed from Healy in the Arctic during AWS15.

2023: In August 2023, Healy was undertaking scientific research for the Nansen and Amundsen Basin Observational System (NABOS), including CTD profiles, in the East Siberian Sea. The ship sailed towards the Siberian shelf with an objective of better understanding the physics of the Nansen and Amundsen basins and in doing so, encroached on Russia's Northern Sea Route. On September 2nd, the Russian research vessel Akademik Nemchinov turned north toward Healy; at their closest, the ships were a few kilometers apart.

== Incidents ==
=== 2006 dive mishap ===
On 17 August 2006, Lieutenant Jessica Hill and PO2 Stephen Duque, died of unspecified causes during diving operations in the Arctic Ocean. The Coast Guard conducted simultaneous safety and administrative investigations the results of which were made public in January 2007 along with a Final Decision Letter dated 23 August 2007.

Initial press reports indicated that the divers were conducting an inspection of the rudder—a routine operation—at the time of the accident, but later reports stated that the two were doing a cold-water training dive near the bow of the ship. The dive was reported to have been planned for a maximum depth of 20 feet (6 m). Lieutenant Hill's father, citing autopsy reports, has indicated that his daughter actually reached a depth of near 200 feet (61 m) in what he described as an out of control descent. The divers were tended by unqualified and poorly-instructed personnel on the surface, none of whom were familiar with cold water diving or scuba diving in general. It is not clear why they extended so much line to the divers. By the time the two could be pulled to the surface, gas reserves were empty and neither diver could be revived.

On 30 August, Commanding Officer Captain Douglas G. Russell, was temporarily relieved of command by Vice Admiral Charles Wuster, citing a "loss of confidence" in Russell's ability to command. The relief was later made permanent by Coast Guard Commandant Admiral Thad Allen.

=== 2020 propulsion motor fire ===
On 18 August 2020, Healy suffered an electrical fire that rendered the electric propulsion motor driving the starboard propeller shaft unusable. At the time of the incident, the icebreaker was underway about 60 nautical miles (110 km; 69 mi) from Seward, Alaska, and headed for Arctic Ocean science operations. The fire was reported at 21:30 and was extinguished within the hour. There were no injuries among the crew but all science operations had to be cancelled and the vessel returned to her home port Seattle on 31 August.

On 18 October 2020, Healy entered a dry dock at the site of the former Mare Island Naval Shipyard where the icebreaker's hull was cut open and the damaged 106-tonne propulsion motor replaced by a spare unit shipped from United States Coast Guard Yard on a barge via the Panama Canal. The icebreaker was floated out on 5 January 2021 and returned to Seattle in mid-February. Healy returned to service in the following summer.

=== 2024 transformer fire ===
At the end of July 2024, Healy suffered another electrical fire that forced the icebreaker to cancel two scientific missions to the Arctic and patrol through the Northwest Passage. Although the fire in one of the ship's transformers was extinguished quickly and without casualties, and ship's crew and contractors managed to restore power to the affected main propulsion motor, the icebreaker nonetheless returned to her homeport Seattle for repairs.

=== 2026 engineering casualty ===
On 13 July 2026, Healy experienced a significant engineering casualty and had to be towed to port for investigation and repairs.

== Awards and honors ==
US Coast Guard E Ribbon for the period of 4 February 2012 to 19 November 2014, at Afloat Training Organization (ATO) Everett, Washington.

- Presidential Unit Citation
- Coast Guard Unit Commendation (3rd)
- Coast Guard Meritorious Unit Commendation (3rd)
- Coast Guard E Ribbon
- National Defense Service Medal
- Antarctic Service Medal
- Coast Guard Arctic Service Medal
- Coast Guard Sea Service Ribbon (7th)

== In popular culture ==
A fictional icebreaker similar in appearance to Healy, named Borealis, briefly appears in the game Half-Life 2: Episode Two. This ship was originally planned to be a Polar-class icebreaker in the original storyline of Half-Life 2.
