= River plume =

Mix of fresh river water and seawater

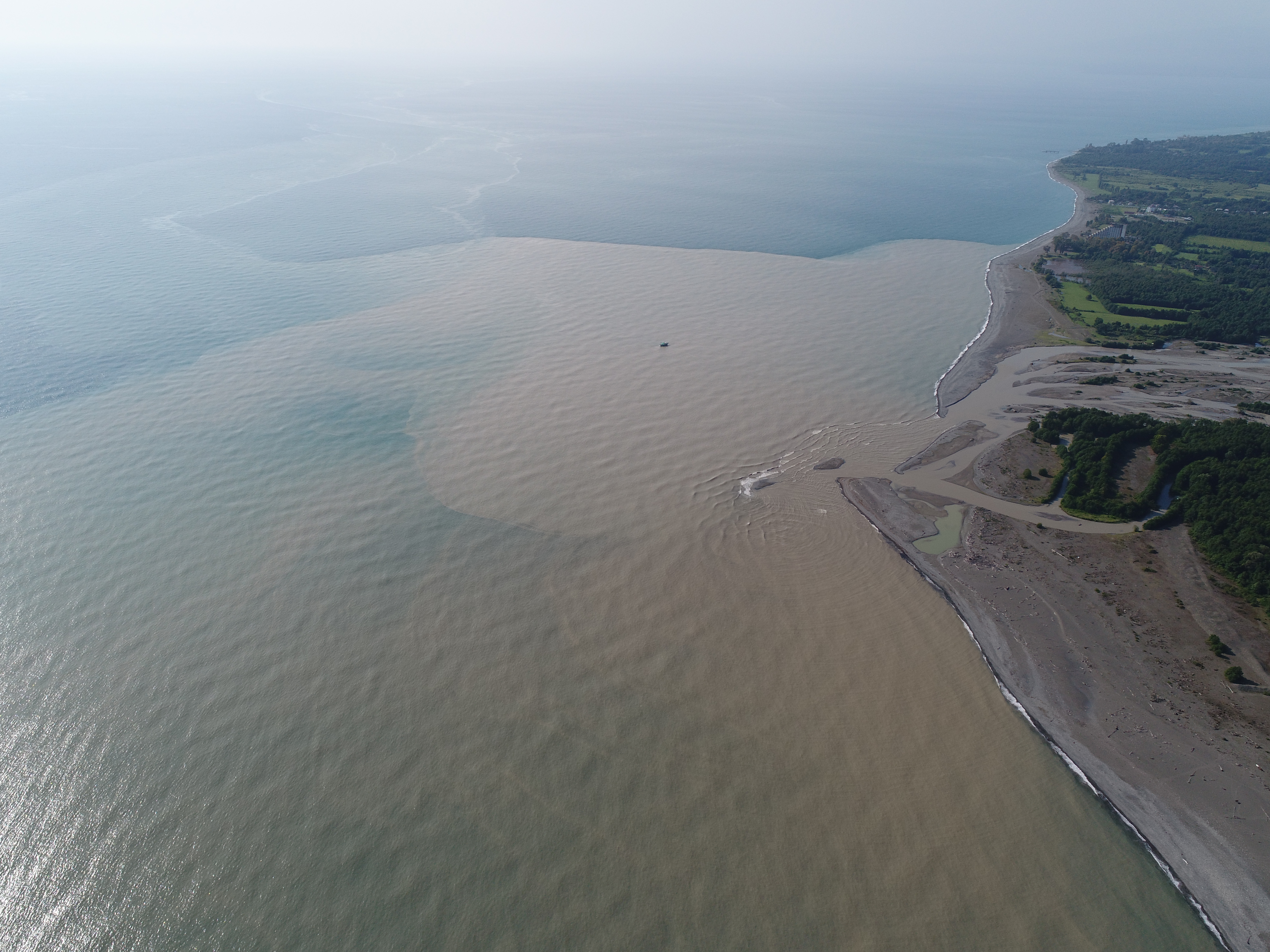
Kodori river plume

A river plume is a freshened water mass that is formed in the sea as a result of mixing of river discharge and saline seawater. River plumes are formed in coastal sea areas at many regions in the World. River plumes generally occupy wide-but-shallow sea surface layers bounded by sharp density gradients. The area of a river plume is 3-5 orders of magnitude greater than its depth; therefore, even small rivers with discharge rates ~1–10 m/s form river plumes with horizontal spatial extents ~10–100 m. Areas of river plumes formed by the largest rivers are ~100–1000 km^{2}. Despite the relatively small volume of total freshwater runoff to the World Ocean, river plumes occupy up to 21% of shelf areas of the ocean, i.e., several million square kilometers.

In some occasions river plumes are spoken of as regions of fresh water influence (ROFIs), although it is preferred to use this term for regions in which multiple sources add to the fresh water input of the zone or for shallow, frictional shelves. ROFIs and river plumes differ in the variation at temporal and spatial scales. The river plume can be identified as a buoyant water mass that emerges due to river discharge into the coastal ocean and varies over diurnal to synoptic timescales. At the edges of this water mass mixing takes place, creating a region adjacent to the river plume which is diluted and fresher compared to the open ocean, but does not have a clear boundary. This extended region is called the region of freshwater influence, ROFI. Due to the indirect influence of freshwater discharge, ROFIs incorporate the dynamics and spatial extent of the river plumes but are typically assessed on seasonal, annual, and decadal timescales.

== Processes ==
River plumes play an important role in global and regional land-ocean interactions. River discharges provide large fluxes of buoyancy, heat, terrigenous sediments, nutrients, and anthropogenic pollutants to the ocean. River plumes strongly influence many physical, biological, and geochemical processes in the coastal and shelf sea areas including stratification of seawater, coastal currents, carbon and biogeochemical cycles, primary production, and seabed morphology.

A river plume is a dynamical system influenced by processes with a wide range of temporal and spatial scales, which depend on the size and shape of the estuary as well as on the type and variation of the forcing from the estuary and the ocean. Feedback mechanisms between sediment deposited by the plume at the submarine delta and the geometry of the delta make for a complex system. Due to this complexity there is not (yet) a general, simple theory that offers quantitative predictability for the motion of particles and the structure of river plumes; however, some theories incorporating simplified assumptions have helped in understanding the important aspects of buoyancy-influenced coastal flows. As is commonly used in fluid dynamics, the description of these complex flows is aided by scaling analysis to determine the relevant processes. The primary parameters which define the structure and scale of an individual river plume are freshwater discharge, tidal energy, coastline bathymetry/geometry, ambient ocean currents, wind, and the rotation of the Earth.

== Structure ==
The balance between the important processes varies over the position in the plume. The following regions can be distinguished: the source region, the liftoff point, the front, and the near field region. Beyond the plume itself but within its area of influence are the mid-field region and the far field region.

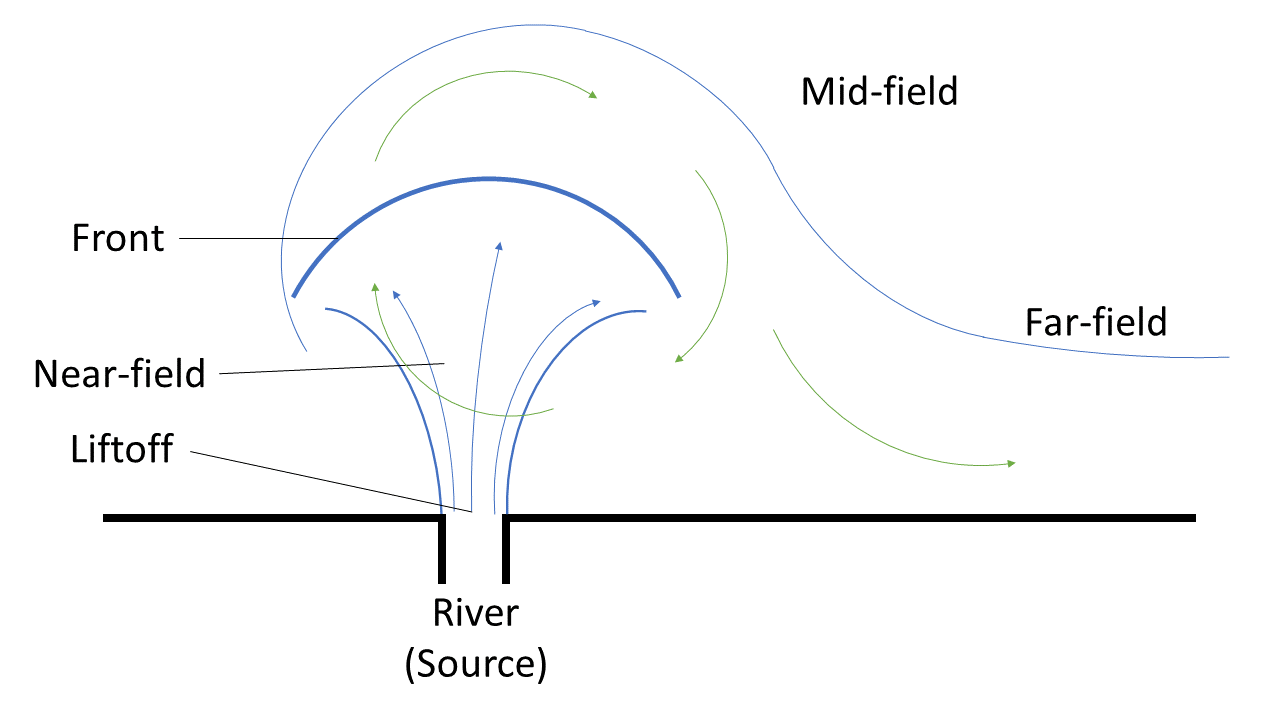
Schematic structure of a river plume, viewed from above. Adapted from Horner-Devine (2015).

=== Source region ===
In the source or estuarine region, the buoyancy and momentum of the freshwater inflow from the estuary are the dominant properties that determine the initiation of the river plume. The competition between river-induced stratification and tidal mixing sets the river plume's characteristic properties. This competition can be captured in the (dimensionless) estuarine Richardson number, which is defined as

$Ri_E = g_r'\frac{Q_r}{W_E u^3_{tidal}},$

where

- the reduced gravity $g'_r = g(\Delta \rho/\rho_0)$ is the gravitational acceleration due to the density difference between fresh river water and saline ocean water,
- $Q_r$ is the river discharge,
- $W_E$ is the estuary width, and
- $u_{tidal}$ is the tidal velocity.

where

- $g'_r = g(\Delta \rho/\rho_0)$ is the gravitational acceleration due to the density difference between fresh river water and saline ocean water,
- $Q_r$ is the river discharge,
- $W_E$ is the estuary width, and
- $u_{tidal}$ is the tidal velocity.

A large estuarine Richardson number (i.e. $Ri_E \gg 1$) indicates that freshwater processes are dominant compared to the tidal influence, and one can expect development of a river plume.

=== Liftoff point ===
In case of strong riverine forcing, often with a large estuarine Richardson number, the front of the plume separates from the bottom. The position at which this flow separation occurs is called the liftoff point and sets the landward edge of the near-field. This point is important in surface-advected river plumes.

=== Near-field region ===
In the near-field the momentum of the plume is larger than its buoyancy. This balance is represented in the (dimensionless) Froude number, $Fr = {u}/{\sqrt{gh}},$ and is larger than one in the near-field, indicating supercritical flow. Both the liftoff point and the outer boundary of the near-field, the plume front, are characterized by critical flow conditions ($Fr=1$) and the flow in the near-field region shows features similar to a jet. The momentum balance is dominated by barotropic and baroclinic pressure gradients, turbulent shear stresses, and flow acceleration. Flow deceleration is mainly caused by the shear stresses on the interface of the plume with the ambient ocean. In some cases a near-field region will not exist. This is for example the case if the width of the river mouth is large relative to the Rossby radius of deformation, $L_R = {\sqrt{gh}}/{f}$, and the fresh water inflow will leave the river mouth as a far-field plume. When tides are large, the near-field plume is also known as the tidal plume.

=== Mid-field region ===
The area at which the near-field inertial jet transfers into a flow in which geostrophic or wind-driven processes are dominant is the midfield-area. The momentum balance of the mid-field is dominated by the rotation of the Earth (Coriolis effect), cross-stream internal pressure gradients, and sometimes centripetal acceleration. The initial momentum of the outflow from the source is lost and the wind forcing (or rotation of the Earth in case of small wind forcing) gradually takes over as the most important parameter. As a result, the flow changes its speed, direction, and spreading pattern. When the influence of wind forcing is small, outflows can sometimes form a recirculating bulge; however, evidence of such a feature in field observations is scant.

=== Far-field region ===
Even further away from the source region is the far-field, where the plume has lost all memory of the outflow momentum. The momentum balance of the far-field is dominated by the rotation of the Earth (Coriolis effect), buoyancy, wind forcing, and bottom stress. The far-field can cover large areas, up to hundreds of kilometers from its source. Diurnal and semi-diurnal variability of the far-field region is generally governed by tides, synoptic variability by wind forcing, and seasonal variability by river discharge. In the absence of strong wind forcing and strong currents, the far-field plume can behave as a current of relatively fresh water in the direction of a propagating Kelvin wave. Examples of this can be observed in the Rhine ROFI, where the river plume can be traced all along the Dutch coast. The character of this coastal current is different in the case of shallow seas, when the current occupies the whole water column and its motion is affected by bottom friction, and in the case of a surface-advected plume whose vertical size is less than the water depth.

== Advection ==
At the most basic and idealized level, river plumes can be classified to be either surface-advected or bottom-advected. A plume is considered to be bottom-advected when it occupies the whole water column from the surface to the seabed. In this case its stratification is mainly horizontal as a result of strong advection over the whole water column, especially near the bed. A surface-advected plume does not interact with the bottom because its vertical size is less than its depth. In this case a plume is mainly vertically stratified. Differentiation between these two (idealized) types of river plumes can be made by evaluating a set of parameters, as set up by Yankovsky and Chapman in their paper from 1997. The distance up to which the fresh water river plume is transported across-shelf by processes at the surface is given by

$y_s = \frac{2}{f}\sqrt{ \frac{3g'h_0+v_i^2}{2g'h_0+v_i^2}},$

where

- $v_i$ is the inflow velocity from the source region and the near-field jet,
- $f$ is the Coriolis force,
- $g'$ is the buoyancy, and
- $h_0$ is the depth of the water column at the mouth of the river/estuary.

Up to the liftoff point, the plume still "feels" the bottom and one speaks of bottom-advected plumes, and the relevant processes involving bottom dynamics must be accounted for. Vertical scales of river plumes formed by the largest rivers across the world are 10–20 m, while the vertical scale of the majority of river plumes is less than several meters. As a result, the majority of river plumes in the world are surface-advected; that is, the bottom-advected part near the estuary before the liftoff point at these plumes is much smaller than the surface-advected part. River plumes with large bottom-advected parts are formed mainly by large rivers that flow into shallow sea areas, such as the Volga plume in the northern part of the Caspian Sea.

=== Bottom-advected plumes ===
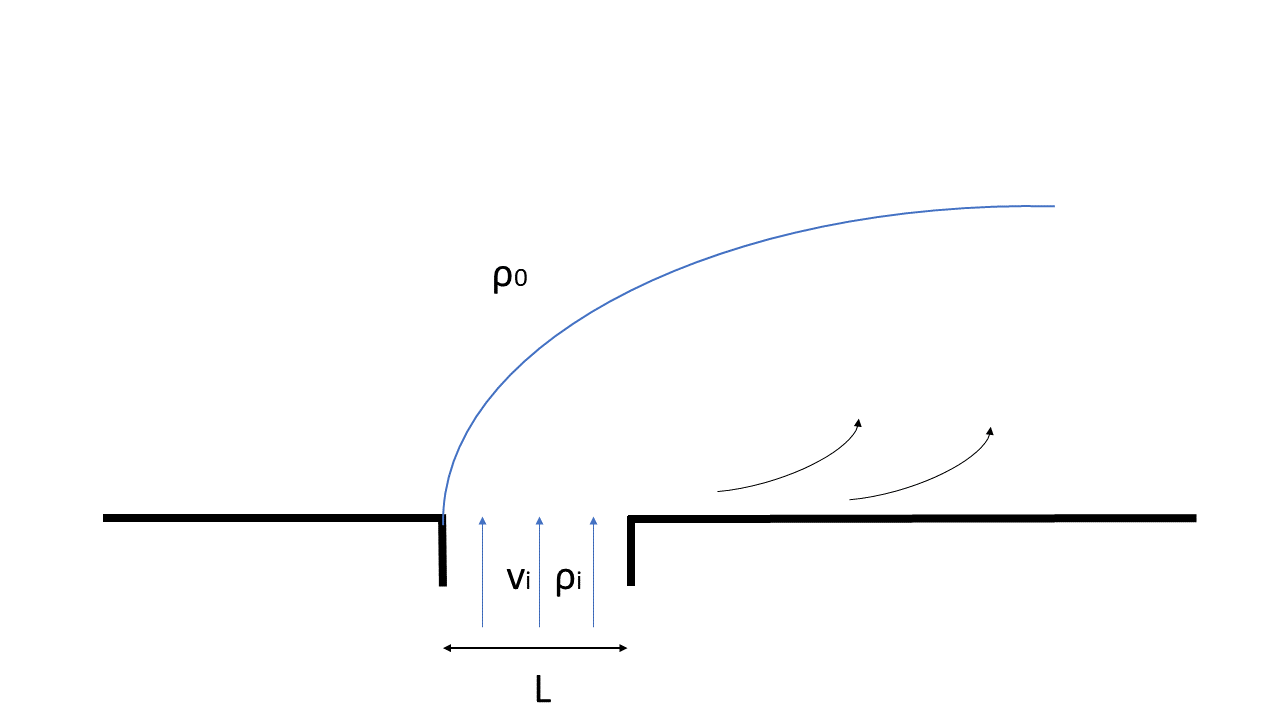
Schematic structure of a bottom-advected river plume, top view. Adapted from Yankovsky and Chapman (1997).

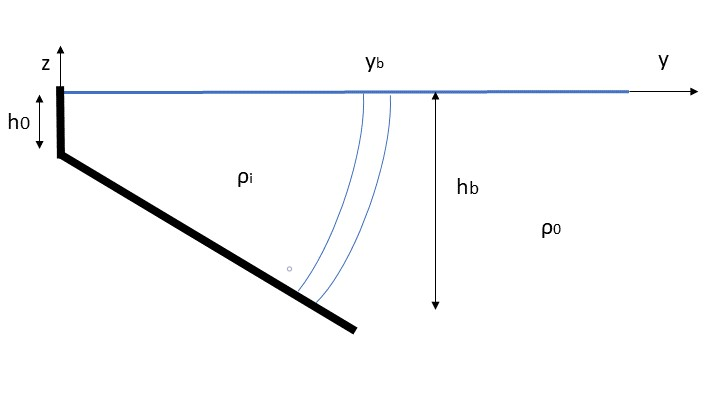
Schematic structure of a bottom-advected river plume, side view. Adapted from Yankovsky and Chapman (1997).

Bottom-advected plumes are often characterized by large discharge conditions and are generally less sensitive to wind forcing and corresponding advection and mixing. This type of advection is driven by bottom Ekman transport, which drives the fresh or brackish river outflow with density $\rho_i$ and velocity $v_i$ from an estuary of width $L$ and depth $h_0$ to the frontal zone across the shelf. This is indicated in the figure to the right. When the frontal zone is far enough from the shore, thermal wind dynamics can transport the complete volume flux away from the estuary. The across-shore position $y_b$, which denotes the width of the coastal current, and the equilibrium-depth $h_b$ at which the plume separates from the bottom can be calculated in equilibrium conditions with a certain bottom slope $s$ by

$h_b = \sqrt{\frac{2fv_ih_0}{g'}}$

$y_b = \frac{h_0}{s}(\sqrt{\frac{2fLv_i}{g'h_0}} - 1)$.

Note that this is only valid when $h_b>h_0$. When $h_b<h_0$the bottom Ekman layer cannot transport the river outflow offshore and another process governs the propagation. In that case, only a surface-advected plume is found.

=== Surface-advected plumes ===
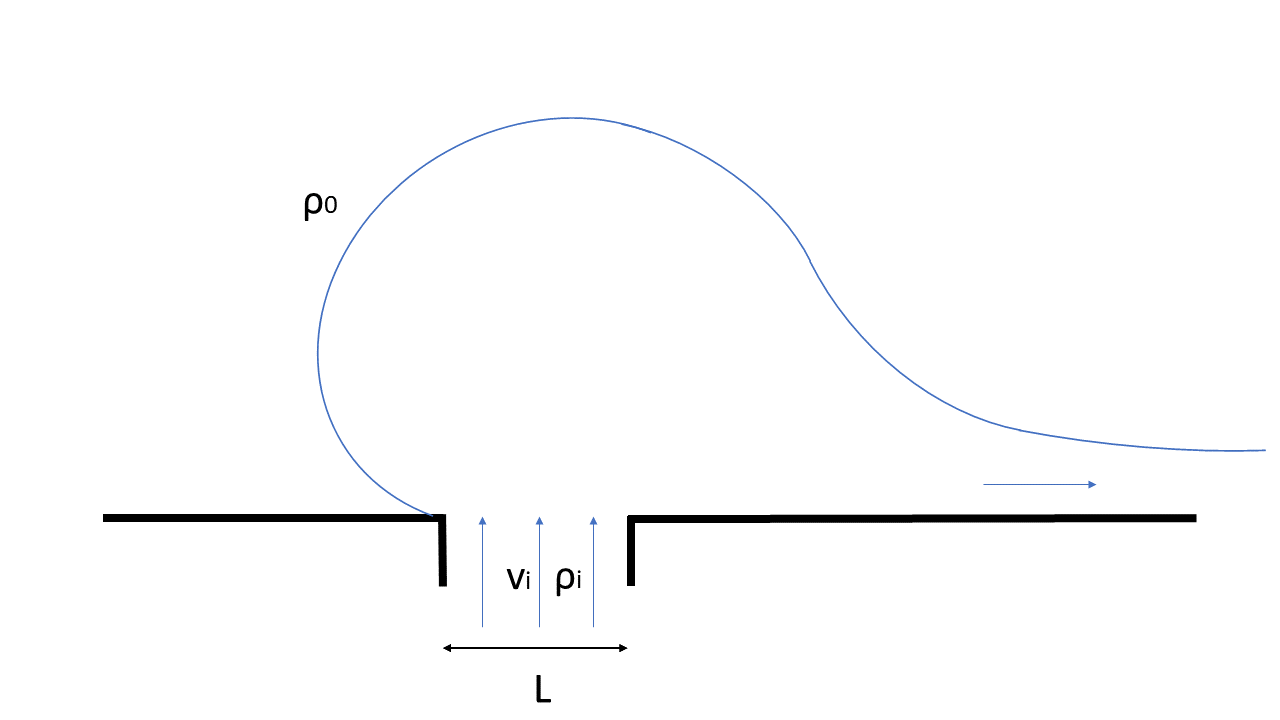
Schematic structure of a surface-advected river plume, top view. Adapted from Yankovsky and Chapman (1997).

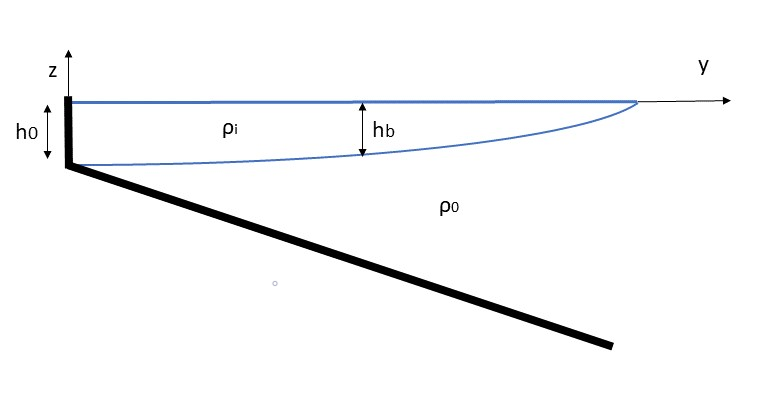
Schematic structure of a surface-advected river plume, side view. Adapted from Yankovsky and Chapman (1997).

Surface-advected plumes occur when the previously defined condition of $h_b<h_0$ is met. A surface-advected plume has the typical structure of a river plume as described in the section river plume structure. In the region near the mouth the initial momentum of the river outflow is the dominant mechanism, after which other processes such as wind forcing and the Coriolis effect take over. In a surface-advected plume,. processes regarding interaction with the bottom such as the development of a bottom Ekman layer are not relevant. Therefore, the defined parameter $y_b$can be ignored in this approach as it has no physical basis.

=== Intermediate plumes ===
In the case that the inflow depth $h_0$ is smaller than depth $h_b$, and the distance up to which the bottom Ekman layer transports the river discharge is smaller than the distance up to which the surface processes transport the river outflow, ($y_b < y_s$), one can find an intermediate plume. In an intermediate plume both regimes can be found. Naturally, the bottom-advected section can be found closer to the estuary mouth and the surface-advected section can be found further offshore. The liftoff point separates the regions.

The approach can be further generalized by non-dimensionalizing the parameters. Non-dimensional parameters have the benefit of simplifying the dynamics of the relevant processes by evaluating the magnitude of different terms. In the case of river plumes, it gives further direction to the basic classification and their different dynamics. The two most relevant non-dimensional numbers are the Burger number $S = \sqrt{g'h_0}/(fL)$, which expresses the relative importance of buoyancy, and the Rossby number $Ro = v_i/(fL)$, which expresses the relative importance of advection. Regrouping leads to the following, non-dimensional cross-shore distances $Y_b$ and $Y_s$:

$Y_s = \frac{2(3S^2 + Ro^2)}{\sqrt{2S^2 + Ro^2}}$

$Y_b = \frac{h_0}{sL}(\frac{\sqrt{2 Ro}}{S} - 1)$.

The same regimes as discussed above hold for the non-dimensional parameters. Bottom-advected plumes ($h_b>h_0$, $Y_b > Y_s$) in general have small Burger numbers and therefore buoyancy is relatively unimportant. Surface-advected plumes ($h_b<h_0$) in general have large Burger numbers and therefore buoyancy is important. Furthermore, the Rossby number indicates whether the plume is classified as a surface-advected plume or an intermediate plume. A relatively large Rossby number compared to the Burger number indicates that advection is important compared to buoyancy and will allow at least partial bottom-advection to occur so that one can expect an intermediate plume.

Note that the scheme described above was developed for idealized cases: that is, for river plumes in absence of external forcing which flow into a sea with idealized bathymetry and shoreline.

== Tidal variation ==
River plumes vary over diurnal to synoptic temporal scales. In this range of temporal scales, the most important periodic variation lies within the tidal cycle, in which a tidal cycle (daily) and a spring-neap cycle (two-weekly) can be distinguished. This barotropic variation in tidal velocity magnitude and direction gives rise to variability in the strength and stability of the river plume. This is already clear from the competition between river discharge and tidal mixing, captured in the (dimensionless) estuarine Richardson number $Ri_E = g_r'{Q_r} /W_E u^3_{tidal}$, which is used to assess in a general fashion whether a river plume can develop in a certain system. The tidal dynamics lead to the following general dynamics of river plumes.

=== Tidal cycle ===
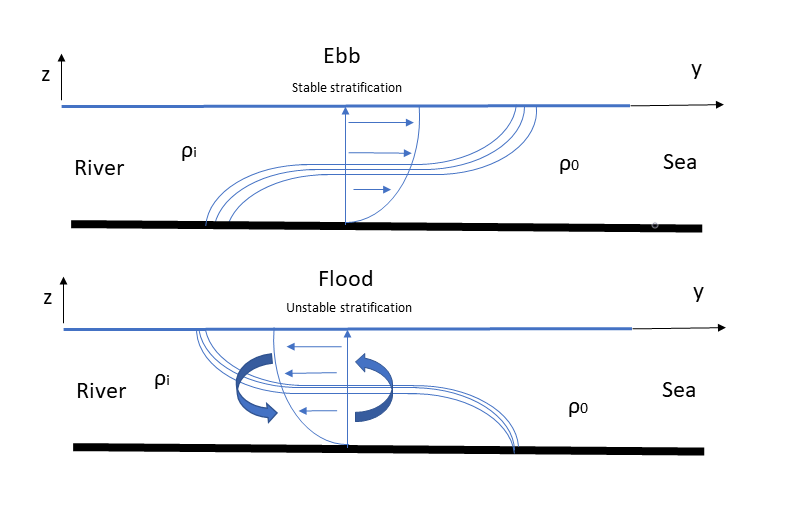
Tidal variation in plume stratification. Tidal straining for ebb flows and tidal mixing for flood flows.

A tidal cycle consists of a flood period or landward flow, and an ebb period or seaward flow. For constant river discharge $Q_r$ one can find a stable stratification during ebb conditions and an unstable stratification during flood conditions. This is schematically portrayed in the figure to the right. The mixing that occurs during flood conditions due to the unstable stratification weakens the stratification and efficient river plume advection and occurs in situations with low estuarine Richardson numbers.

During ebb conditions the stratification is enhanced. This leads to stable conditions and strong advection at the surface. Due to mass conservation, this situation requires enhanced landward flows near the bottom. This process is called tidal straining. In the case of an open coast, two-dimensional effects start playing a role. Baroclinic Ekman transport causes upwelling during ebb flows and downwelling during flood flows. Therefore, these baroclinic upwelling effects can cause ebb flows to transport nutrients and sediment towards the coast.

=== Spring-neap cycle ===
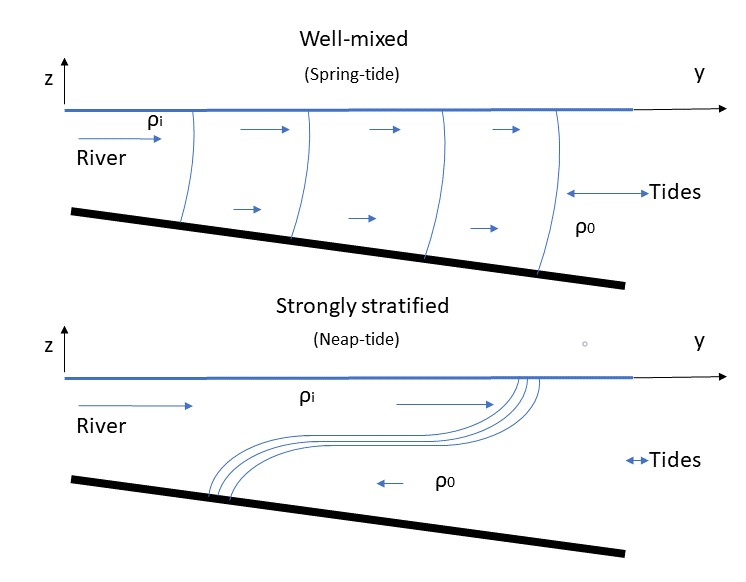
Schematic of the spring-tide and neap-tide extremes for river plume stratification. Adapted from Valle-Levinson (2010).

Over a spring-neap cycle the baroclinic effects over a tidal cycle amplify and favor either increased tidal straining or tidal mixing. Spring tides are characterized by relatively large tidal amplitudes and tidal flow velocities. This leads to increased tidal mixing over the complete tidal cycle and weakened stratification. In some areas the stratification vanishes completely, resulting in a well-mixed system, and these systems can only incorporate river plumes some of the time. In open-coast systems, spring tide conditions generally lead to increased downwelling effects from the buoyant river plume, causing increased seaward transport of sediment and nutrients.

Neap tides are characterized by relatively low tidal amplitudes and tidal flow velocities. This situation favors the tidal straining effect as observed during ebb tides due to decreased tidal mixing and increased differential flow over a tidal cycle. Due to the stronger tidal straining effect, neap tide conditions are generally characterized by increased landward flow near the bottom and associated increased coastal upwelling effects. In extreme cases this can lead to large depositions on the beach, such as the mass beaching event of starfish at the coast near Scheveningen January 30, 2019.

== Natural examples ==
=== Fraser River ===
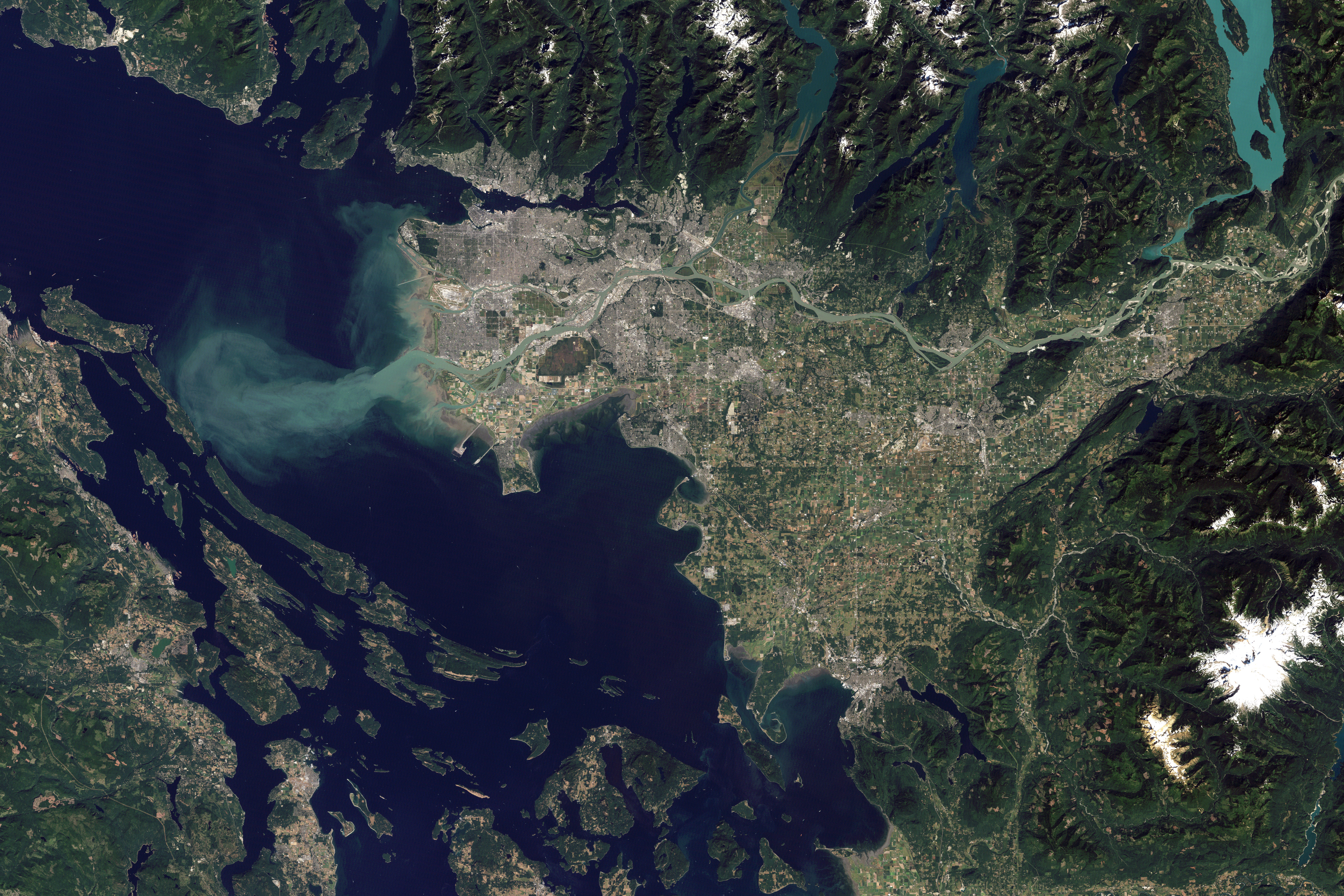
The Fraser River plume

An example of a surface-advected plume is the Fraser River plume. The Fraser River plume contains all dynamical regions, clearly visible from space. The initial jet-like structure gradually transfers into a far-field plume further offshore, which is deflected to the right as would be expected on the Northern Hemisphere due to the Coriolis effect. Other similar river plumes are those of the Columbia River, the Niagara River, and the Hudson River.

=== Amazon River ===
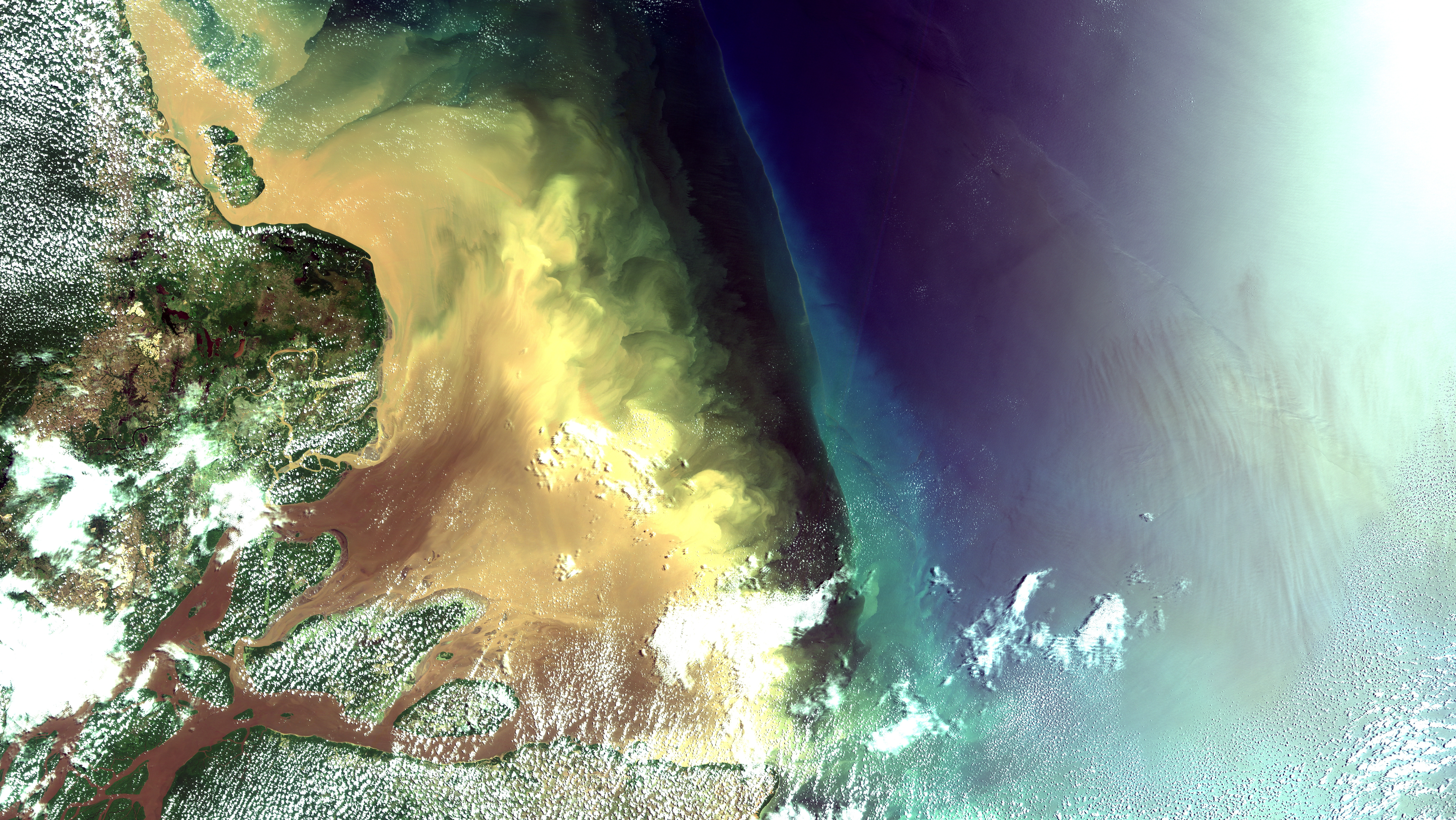
The Amazon River plume

The Amazon River plume is an example of a river plume in which the Earth's rotation does not play a role. Due to the high discharge, the corresponding momentum of the outflow, and the equatorial latitude, the dynamics of the plume are mainly characterized by the internal Froude number. Ambient currents transport the plume away from the mouth. Similar plumes can be found elsewhere along the Equator.

=== Mersey River ===
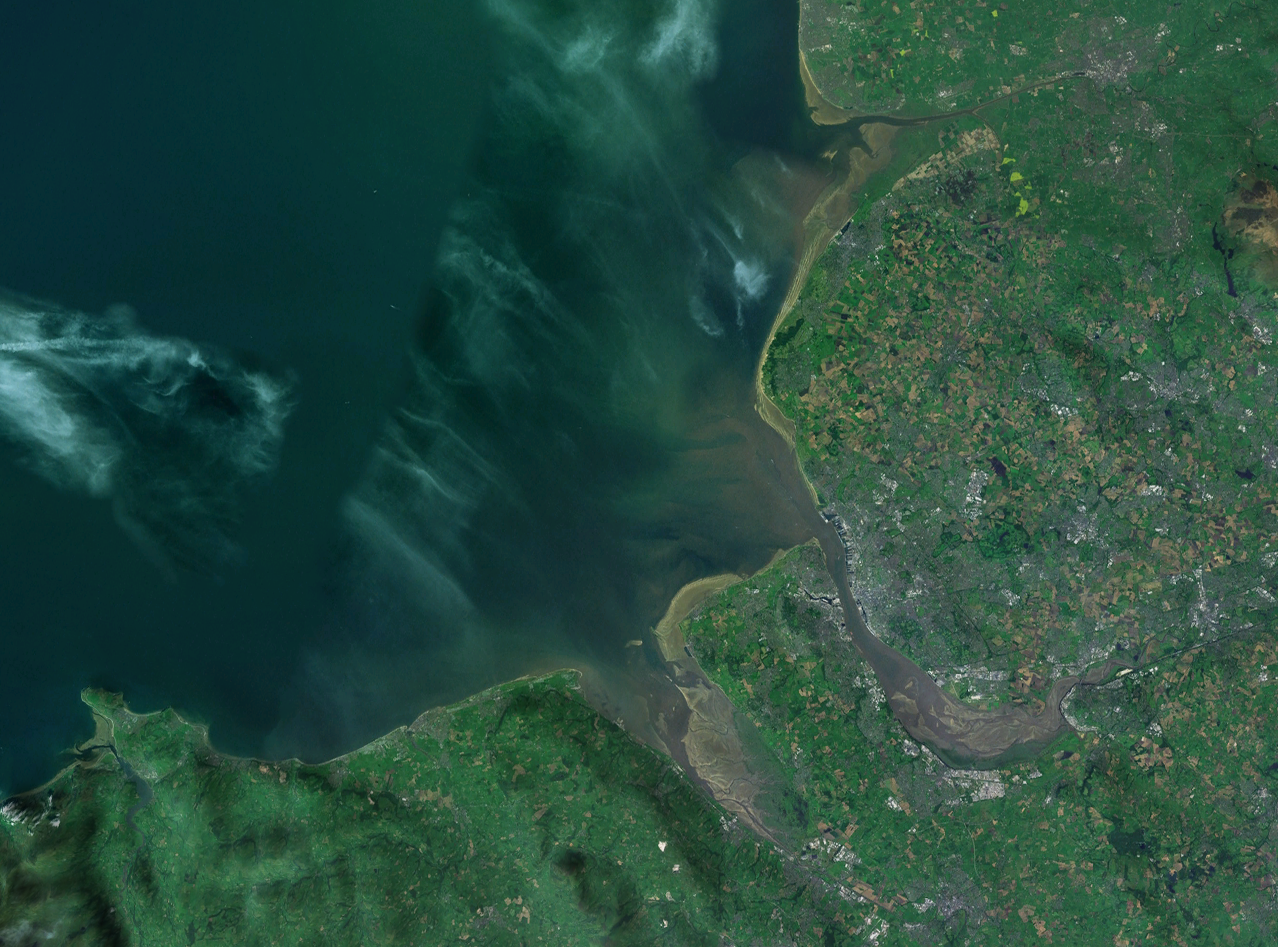
The Mersey River plume

The dynamics of the Mersey River plume at the mouth of Liverpool Bay show high resemblance to a bottom-advected plume. This is due to strong influence of the bottom and bottom friction on the flow, and this controls the cross-shore spreading and length-scale. This type of plume can often be found at marginal seas and shelf seas, such as in the North Sea at the mouth of the Rhine.

== See also ==
- Plume (fluid dynamics)
- Region of freshwater influence
