= Debouch =

Water runoff from a smaller place to a larger one

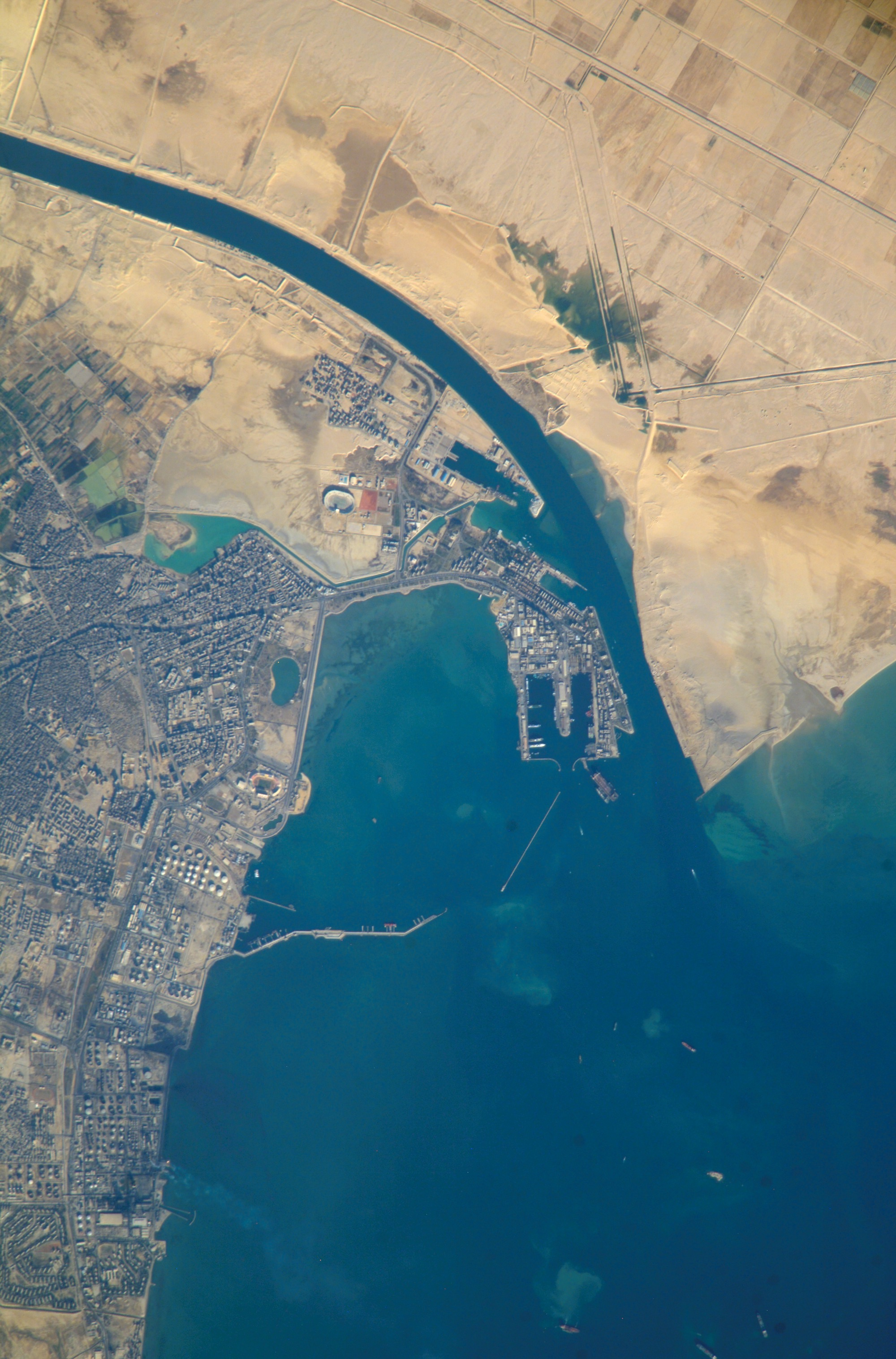
The port and city are the southern terminus of the Suez Canal, which flows through Egypt and debouches into the Gulf of Suez near Port Tawfiq

In hydrology, a debouch (or debouche) is a place where runoff from a small, confined space discharges into a larger, broader body of water. The word is derived from the French verb déboucher (pronounced [debuʃe]), which means 'to unblock, to clear'.

== Geology ==
In fluvial geomorphology, a debouch is a place where runoff from a small, confined space emerges into a larger, broader space. Common examples are when a stream runs into a river or when a river runs into an ocean. Debouching can generate massive amounts of sediment transport. When a narrow stream travels down a mountain pass into a basin, an alluvial fan will form from the mass deposit of the sediment. The four largest rivers (the Amazon, the Ganges, the Yangtze and the Yellow) are responsible for 20% of the global discharge of sediment in to the oceans by debouches.

== Geography ==
In fluvial geography, a debouch is a place where a body of water pours forth from a narrow opening. Some examples are: where a river or stream emerges from a narrow constraining landform, such as a defile, into open country or a wider space; a creek joins a river; or a stream flows into a lake.

== See also ==
- Fluvial landforms of streams
- Region of freshwater influence
