= Mendeleev Ridge =

Ridge in the Arctic Ocean

Coordinates: 80°00′N 178°00′W

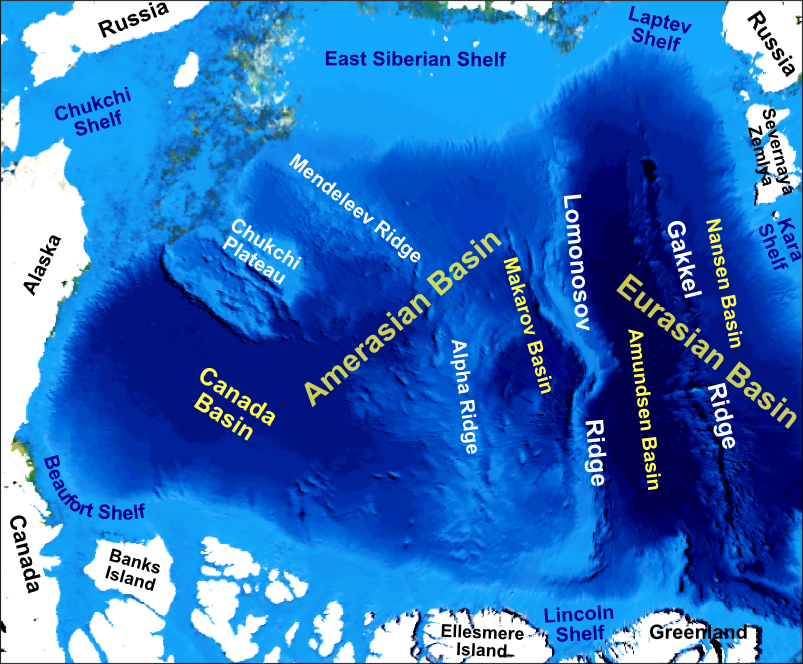
Main bathymetric/topographic features of the Arctic Ocean

The Mendeleev Ridge (Russian: Хребет Менделеева) or Mendeleev Rise is a broad ridge in the Arctic Ocean from the East Siberian Sea area of the Siberian Shelf to the central areas of the ocean. It is attached to the Alpha Ridge of the Amerasian Basin. It is named after Dmitri Mendeleyev. The Ridge was discovered in 1948 by Soviet high latitude expeditions. The name was approved by the Sub-Committee on Geographical Names and Nomenclature of Ocean Bottom Features (SCGN, now SCUFN) in April 1987.

The Mendeleev Ridge is instrumental in the Russian claim to the North pole. The territory claimed by Russia in the submission is a large portion of the Arctic Ocean, including the North Pole. One of the arguments was a statement, that the underwater Lomonosov Ridge and Mendeleev Ridge are extensions of the Eurasian continent. In 2002 the UN Commission neither rejected nor accepted the Russian proposal, recommending additional research.

The origin of the ridge is still contested due to limited data, and it is unclear whether it is an oceanic or continental feature and whether its origin is associated with the Alpha Ridge.
