= Hope Basin =

Geological feature of the Chukchi Sea Shelf off Alaska

Coordinates: 68.1815°N 171.3076°W

The Hope Basin is a geological feature of the Chukchi Sea Shelf. It lies off the Chukchi Sea coast of Alaska. Its area extends from the outer continental shelf of the Seward Peninsula for about 700 km (430 mi) westwards off the coast of Chukotka towards Wrangel Island.

The Hope Basin is limited on its northeastern side by the Herald Arch (Herald Thrust), a basement uplift cored by Cretaceous thrust faults. The Herald Arch is named after Herald Island.

Type: Early Tertiary extensional basin (mainly).

== Bibliography ==
- Cacy, Robin Lee (2003-03-25), MMS Seeks Interest in Exploring Frontier Areas of Norton Basin and Chukchi Sea-Hope Basin for Oil and Gas (PDF), MMS Alaska OCS Region, archived from the original (PDF) on 2008-09-17
- Elswick, Virginia L.; Toro, Jaime (November 2–5, 2003), Seismic Interpretation and Structural Evaluation of the Hope Basin, Alaska, Geological Society of America
