= Chukchi Shelf =

Continental shelf

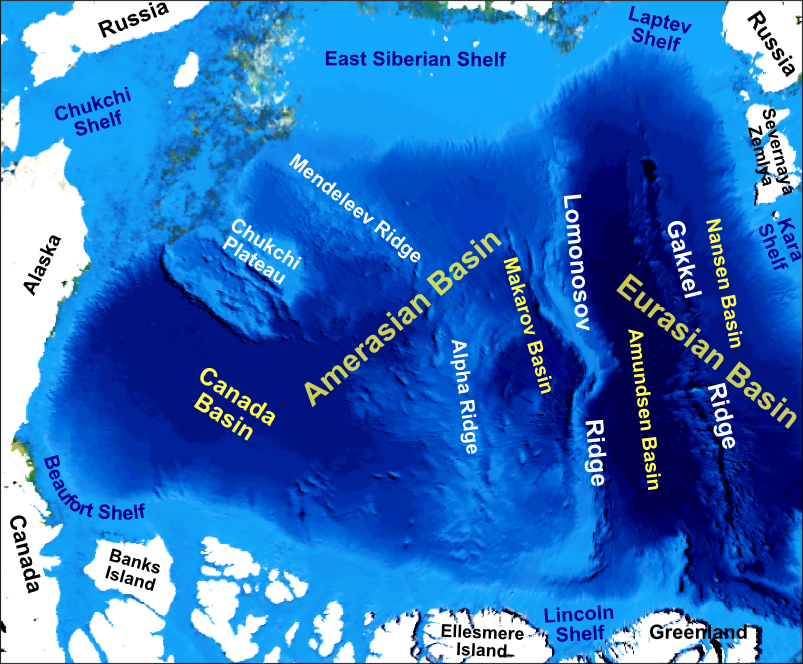
Location of the Chukchi Sea Shelf in the Arctic Ocean

The Chukchi Shelf or Chukchi Sea Shelf is the westernmost part of the continental shelf of the United States and the easternmost part of the continental shelf of Russia. In the west it merges with the Russian Siberian Shelf. Within this shelf, the 50-mile Chukchi Corridor acts as a passageway for one of the largest marine mammal migrations in the world.

The main geological features of the Chukchi Shelf are the Hope Basin and the Herald Thrust, a basement uplift cored by Cretaceous thrust faults. The latter is named after Herald Island. Off the northwestern Alaskan coast there is a Jurassic rift basin, the Hannah Trough. To the north of Alaska the Chukchi Shelf extends to form the Chukchi Plateau which protrudes into the Arctic Ocean geological zone.

The Chukchi Shelf is shared between Russia and the United States according to the June 1990 USSR–USA Maritime Boundary Agreement.

== 50-Mile Chukchi Corridor ==
The Chukchi Corridor is a 50-mile wide strip of ocean offshore of Northwest Alaska that acts as a passageway for one of the largest marine mammal migrations in the world.

=== Geography ===
Following the Chukchi Sea coast, the Chukchi Corridor stretches from Point Hope, Alaska to Utqiagvik, Alaska. From winter through early summer, the area is covered in sea ice with recurring openings in the ice that allow wildlife to migrate north from the Bering Sea to areas of the Chukchi or Beaufort seas during spring and early summer

=== Fauna ===
The Chukchi Sea coastline serves as an essential corridor for marine mammals like bowhead whales, beluga whales, Pacific walrus, and bearded seals. It is also an important hunting area for indigenous subsistence hunters. This region includes biologically important gray whale feeding and reproduction habitats Many bird species navigate the Chukchi Corridor to migrate to the North Slope for summer breeding

As a region with substantial seafloor productivity, the Chukchi Corridor is an important nursery habitat for forage fish species, Arctic cod, and Saffron cod. Saffron and Arctic cod are critical to the Arctic marine food web.

=== Importance ===
The Chukchi Corridor is an extremely important region for subsistence hunting for the communities of Point Hope, Point Lay, Wainright, and Utqiagvik, Alaska. Studies show that Inupiaq rely extensively on areas in the Chukchi Corridor for hunting throughout the year.

The National Marine Fisheries Service designated areas along the entire Chukchi coast out to 15–30 miles offshore as Essential Fish Habitat (EFH) for saffron cod. In 2001, the U.S. Fish and Wildlife Service designated Ledyard Bay as critical habitat for spectacled eiders.

Currently, part of the corridor is protected from oil and gas activities. On January 27, 2015, President Obama, using his authorities under the Outer Continental Shelf Lands Act, permanently withdrew the waters 3 to 25 miles offshore from future oil and gas leasing activities. This action leaves the valuable waters 25 to 50 miles offshore unprotected.

== Geology ==
The Chukchi Shelf and surrounding regions have a recent history of petroleum production and exploration, with development of the nearby North Slope region dominating petroleum production in Alaska with over 10 billion barrels of oil produced between 1977 and 2005. The stratigraphy and structural geology of the Chukchi Shelf have been studied due to it being a potential source area of sediment that filled the North Slope basin.

Studies using seismic reflection data in the Chukchi Shelf have shown that the structural history of the shelf is complex with multiple events of deformation from the Devonian through Cenozoic time. The structural deformation features of the shelf have been reactivated at least four different times, from thin-skinned crustal shortening creating a fold and thrust belt in the Devonian, to reactivation of thrust faults as normal faults during crustal extension in the Jurassic to create the Hanna Trough. These normal faults were then again reactivated as thrust faults in the southern shelf in the Jurassic, and reactivated as normal faults again in the early Cenozoic.

The process of deformational features being reactivated throughout different stress regimes in time is excellent evidence of structural inheritance, where previously used planes of weakness are used in both shortening and extensional regimes. These examples in the Chukchi Shelf show that structural inheritance can survive multiple deformational events through hundreds of millions of years. These concepts play a role in petroleum exploration since deformational planes of weakness can create or destroy petroleum plays depending on the surrounding stratigraphy.
