= MT Renda =

- MT Renda in Nome, Alaska in January 2012

History
- Name: Aleysk (1984–1991); Aleiska (1991–1996); Renda (1996–2016); Tigr-1 (2016–2019)
- Owner: Latvian Shipping Co. (1984–1991); Aleyska Shipping Corp. (1991–1996); Renda Shipping Ltd. (1996–2013); Alisa Co. Ltd. (2013–2016); Tigr-Oil LLC (2016–2019)
- Port of registry: Ventspils, Soviet Union (1984–1991); Latvia (1991–1996); Vladivostok, Russia (present)
- Builder: Rauma-Repola, Savonlinna, Finland
- Yard number: 281
- Laid down: 7 January 1983
- Launched: 21 April 1983
- Completed: 10 February 1984
- In service: 1984–2019
- Identification: IMO number: 8129618; Call sign: UFFA; MMSI number: 273440850
- Fate: Broken up

General characteristics
- Type: Oil tanker
- Tonnage: 5,191 GT; 1,645 NT; 6,175 DWT
- Displacement: 9,400 tonnes
- Length: 113 m (371 ft)
- Beam: 18.3 m (60 ft)
- Draft: 7.2 m (24 ft)
- Ice class: RMRS UL
- Installed power: BMZ 6DKRN45/120-7 (3,960 kW)
- Propulsion: Single shaft; fixed pitch propeller
- Speed: 15 knots (28 km/h; 17 mph)
- Crew: 22

Renda (Ренда) was a Russian ice-strengthened oil tanker. In 2012, she was noted for a fuel supply mission through a pack ice field to Nome, Alaska. The vessel was broken up in 2019.

== Career ==
Renda was laid down at Rauma-Repola shipyard in Savonlinna, Finland, on 7 January 1983 and launched ready as Aleysk on 10 February 1984. She was delivered to the Latvian Shipping Company with Ventspils as her port of registry. After the fall of the Soviet Union in 1991, she was sold or handed over to Aleyska Shipping Corporation, reflagged to Latvia and renamed Aleiska. In 1996, she was acquired by Renda Shipping Ltd. and renamed Renda. She has been used to transport oil products in the Russian far east and has occasionally called ports of Adak and Dutch Harbor in Alaska. In 2013, she was sold to Alisa Co. Ltd. but retained her old name and Russian flag. In 2016, the vessel was sold again and renamed Tigr-1. She was broken up in 2019.

=== 2005 escort of Passat ===
In February 2005, a 5,782 GT general cargo ship Passat send out a distress call after the vessel became trapped among ice floes 32 nautical miles (59 km; 37 mi) from the southern tip of Sakhalin Island. Passat had been underway from Korsakov (Russia) to Busan (South Korea) when it encountered difficult ice conditions. By the time a decision was made to turn back, the vessel had already been surrounded by ice. The distress call was picked up by Renda. The oil tanker, designed for operations in the ice-infested Arctic waters, reached the icebound Passat, cut her free from the ice, and escorted the general cargo ship to open water.

=== 2012 fuel supply mission to Nome ===
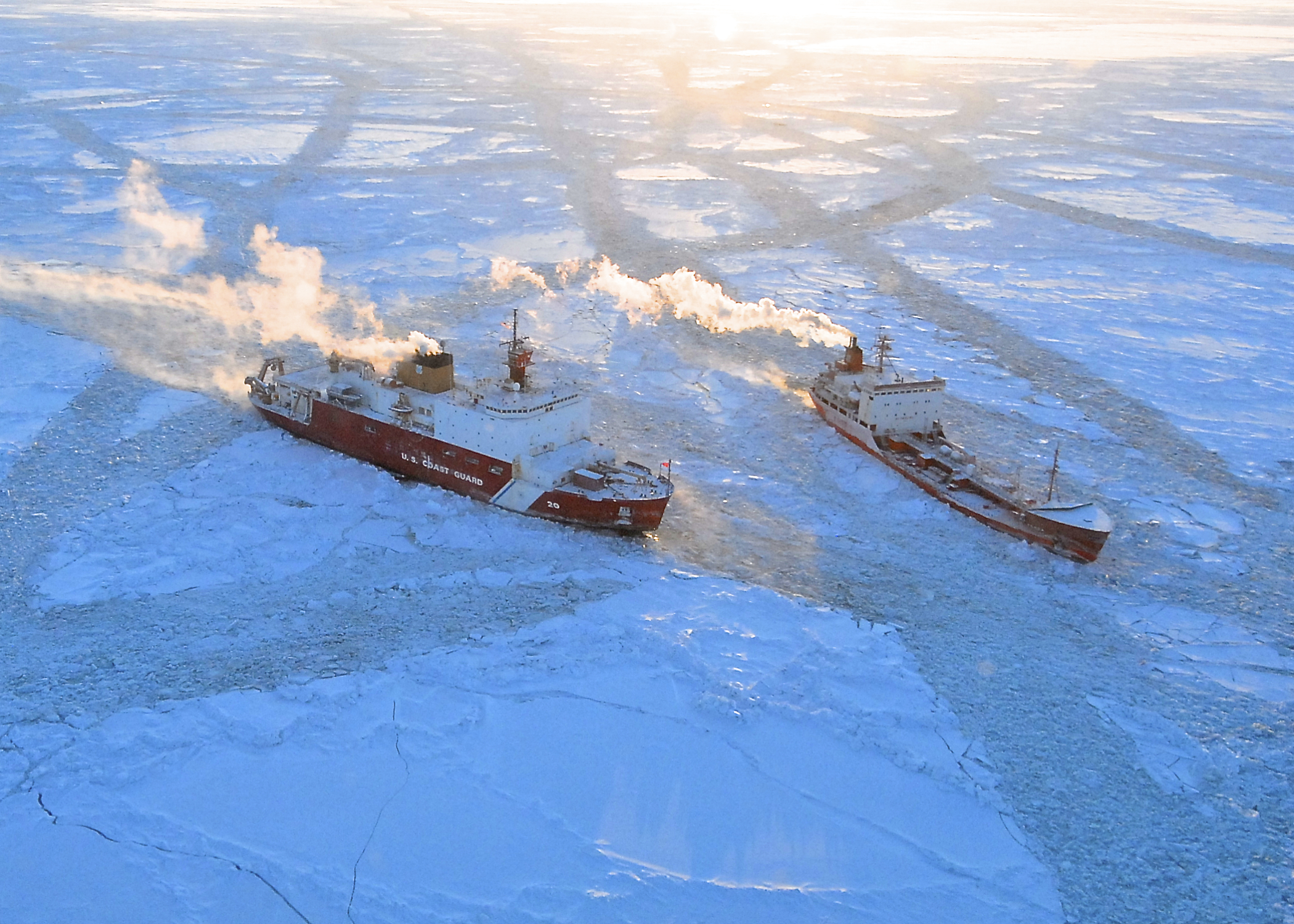
Renda escorted by USCGC Healy (WAGB-20)

In the aftermath of a very significant November Bering Sea storm, a cold snap caused rapid sea ice formation, prevented a delivery of fuel to Nome, Alaska. Without this, the city of 3,600 inhabitants would run out of fuel months before the first shipment could be arranged in late May or June of the following year. As a result, the ice-strengthened oil tanker Renda was chartered to carry a cargo of diesel fuel, heating oil and gasoline to the city. This was the first time a fuel supply mission was attempted in the middle of the winter. In January 2012, a Jones Act waiver was arranged with the support of Alaska's congressional delegation so that Renda could load fuel at Dutch Harbor and transport it to Nome, a task normally reserved for US-flagged vessels.

At the time, Nome was separated from open water by a 300-mile (480 km) pack ice field. The task of escorting Renda safely to the icebound city was given to USCGC Healy, the only American icebreaker in service at the time. The ten-day voyage through the ice was closely followed by the press.

While welcomed by the residents, the fuel supply mission raised questions about the capability of the Coast Guard icebreaker fleet. At the time, Healy was the only active polar icebreaker in the United States while in the meantime Russia had 26 polar icebreakers in service, including a number of heavy nuclear-powered ones.

== General characteristics ==
Renda was 113 metres (371 ft) long and has a beam of 18.3 metres (60 ft). Fully laden, she drew 7.2 metres (24 ft) of water and has a displacement of 9,400 tonnes. She had a gross tonnage of 5,191, net tonnage of 1,645 and deadweight tonnage of 6,175 tonnes. Her hull was strengthened for navigation in ice according to the Russian Maritime Register of Shipping ice class UL and she had a raked icebreaker bow.

Renda was powered by a single 6-cylinder BMZ 6DKRN45/120-7 low-speed two-stroke diesel engine, manufactured under licence from Burmeister & Wain in the Soviet Union. The main engine had an output of 3,960 kW (5,310 hp) and was coupled directly to a propeller shaft driving a fixed pitch propeller. In open water, the ship had a service speed of 15 knots (28 km/h; 17 mph).
