= Evelyn Lessard =

Biological oceanographer

Evelyn Lessard is a biological oceanographer and a professor at the University of Washington's School of Oceanography.

== Early life ==
Growing up in Connecticut, Lessard graduated from Middlebury College in Vermont, before completing further study in Oceanography at University of Rhode Island. Although she enjoyed science as a child, Lessard credits one of her biology university lecturers with inspiring her into the field of marine biology, and chose the field of Oceanography due to the potential for field work and travel.

== Bering Sea Ecosystem Expedition ==
In 2009 Evelyn Lessard was involved in the Bering Sea Ecosystem Expedition aboard the USCGC Healy. This expedition sought to learn about sea ice, and how climate change will affect it. As the Co-Chief Scientist, Lessard studied how changes to sea ice will affect krill. Lessard was joined by Marine Organic Geochemist Rodger Harvey and together they led a team Lessard nicknamed the 'Krill Gang' to determine the different rates of lipids krill acquire preying on different food sources, as well as measuring krill growth and egg production to gage future population.

== Current academic projects ==
Along with lecturing in marine biology, Lessard's current research work focuses on the effect climate has on ocean temperature and acidification. Lessard's climate studies including focusing on marine microzooplankton and phytoplankton. Additionally she focuses on how algal blooms off the Pacific Northwest Coast could be predicted. In 2016 Lessard spoke to The New York Times about experiencing difficulties in acquiring funding for a project to deploy sensors to identify algae blooms - similar projects in the Gulf of Mexico have detected levels of toxic algae high enough to cause poisoning.

== Publications ==
Lessard has published prolifically on topics such as phytoplankton, algae blooms, and other oceanic organisms. She has contributed to such academic journals as Marine Biology, Marine Chemistry as well as books such as Culturing Free-Living Marine Phagotrophic Dinoflagellates.
