= Siberian Shelf =

Coastal shelf in the Arctic Ocean

Coordinates: 79°N 80°E

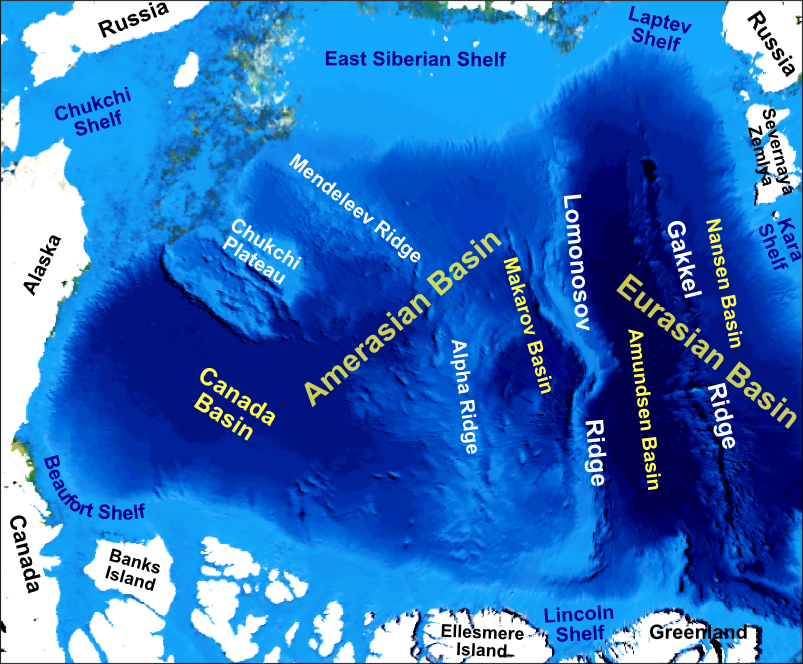
Bathymetric/topographic map of the Arctic Ocean and the surroundings

The Siberian Shelf is a coastal shelf in the Arctic Ocean and is the largest continental shelf of the Earth, a part of the continental shelf of Russia. It extends from the continent of Eurasia in the general area of North Siberia (hence the name) into the Arctic Ocean. It stretches to 1,500 kilometers (930 mi) offshore. It is relatively shallow, with average depth of 100 m. A number of islands are within the shelf, including the Wrangel Island, Novaya Zemlya, and the New Siberian Islands.

It is encompassed by the Kara Sea, Laptev Sea, and East Siberian Sea, and respectively subdivided into the Kara Shelf, the Laptev Shelf and the East Siberian Shelf.

Eastwards it merges into the Chukchi Shelf (of the Chukchi Sea) shared by Eurasia and North America (i.e., by Russia and the United States).

Westwards it merges into the Barents Shelf of the Barents Sea.

Also, the New Siberian Islands and the New Siberian Rift Basin define the 'New Siberian Shelf.'

According to the split of the high Arctic by the Lomonosov mid-ocean ridge into the Eurasian Basin and Amerasian Basin, the Siberian Shelf is split between the Eurasian Shelf and the Amerasian Shelf.

== Flora and fauna ==
The Siberian Shelf is the habitat for numerous flora and fauna. Notably the Polar bear is found through much of the shelf, including the Barents Sea and Chukchi Sea.

== See also ==
- East Siberian Sea
- Milne Ice Shelf
