= Region of freshwater influence =

Coastal sea region

Region of Freshwater Influence (ROFI) is a region in coastal sea where stratification is governed by the local input of freshwater discharge from the coastal source, while the role of the seasonal input of buoyancy from atmospheric heating is much smaller.

== Background ==
ROFI and river plume are similar terms related to water masses formed as a result of mixing of river discharge and sea water. The difference between river plumes and ROFI's consists in their spatial scales and freshwater residence time. River plumes are regarded as water masses formed as a result of transformation of freshwater discharge in coastal sea on diurnal to synoptic time scales, while ROFI’s reproduce transformation of freshwater discharge on seasonal to annual time scales. A river plume embedded into a ROFI reproduces a continuous process of transformation of freshwater discharge.

Initially, river discharge enters the shelf sea from a river mouth and forms a sub-mesoscale (with spatial extents ~1-10 km) or mesoscale (with spatial extents ~10-100 km) water mass referred to as a river plume. Salinity within a plume is significantly lower than that of surrounding sea water. Structure and dynamical characteristics within a river plume are strongly inhomogeneous. In particular, salinity and velocity fields in the vicinity of a freshwater source are significantly different as compared to the outer parts of a plume. A river plume is spreading and mixing with ambient saline sea water, which results in the transformation of a plume, but also influences the hydrological structure of the ambient sea. The strength and extent of this influence mainly depend on the volume of freshwater discharge and varies from negligible impact of small plumes formed by rivers with low discharge rates to the formation of stable freshened water masses in the upper ocean by the World’s largest rivers on wide coastal and shelf areas. The latter water masses with spatial extents on the order of hundreds of kilometers are referred to as regions of freshwater influence. These water masses are characterized by rather homogeneous structure, significantly greater spatial scales, and lower temporal variability, as compared to river plumes.

== See also ==
- Plume (fluid dynamics)
- River plume
