= Hanna Shoal =

Shoal in the Chukchi Sea

Coordinates: 72.06°N 162.09°W

Hanna Shoal is a shallow, natural shoal located off the coast of northwest Alaska in the Chukchi Sea. The region around Hanna Shoal is one of the Chukchi Sea’s most biologically productive areas.

Map of Hanna Shoal in the Chukchi Sea

As a biologically important region for marine mammals and seabirds, Hanna Shoal is an important hunting area for local people. The Chukchi Sea is thought to contain significant oil and gas reserves, and the greater Hanna Shoal region has long been part of a public conversation about conservation and extraction.

== Geography ==
This shallow underwater shoal diverts warm water masses flowing northward from the Bering Sea and holds colder water long into the summer season, which in turn allows sea ice to persist longer in this area. While the shoal is no longer covered by continuous pack ice all year as it historically was, it still has the most reliable ice present on the entire Chukchi shelf.

== Fauna ==
Due to the region’s high primary productivity, rich seafloor, and late summer sea ice, Hanna Shoal is a significant hot spot for wildlife. Pack ice and ice floes are highly important haulout and resting areas for species like the pacific walrus, polar bear, bearded seal, and ringed seal.

Hanna Shoal is also an important foraging area for many bird species. Species that have been identified in this region are black-legged kittiwake, black guillemot, crested auklet, glaucous gull, ivory gull, northern fulmar, pomarine jaeger, and Ross’s gull.

A major migration corridor for several species crosses the Hanna Shoal region. Bowhead whales traveling past Barrow Canyon cross the region in autumn to access habitats in Russian waters, as do beluga whales. Marine birds also migrate through this corridor, including Steller’s eider, king eiders, ivory gulls, and Ross’s gulls.

== Importance ==
Hanna Shoal is likely to provide ecosystem resilience to climate change due to the stable physical features of the region that divert water masses and encourage lingering sea ice floes; these dynamics influence the rich seafloor and the local wildlife diversity. The unique combination of characteristics that distinguish Hanna Shoal as a key feature of the Chukchi Sea are likely to persist in future decades, making this area a priority for conservation over the long-term. As part of a Bureau of Ocean Energy Management (BOEM) environmental stewardship program, the Hanna Shoal Ecosystem Study was launched. The Hanna Shoal Ecosystem Study is currently working to further reveal why the area is so highly productive.

In 2008, the Minerals Management Service, the predecessor agency to BOEM, sold oil and gas leases in the Chukchi Sea, including in the Hanna Shoal region, for $2.67 billion. Companies, led by Shell, pushed to drill exploration wells in the area.

Hanna Shoal and the surrounding region influenced by its productivity were identified by conservation groups as an Important Ecological Areas of the U.S. Arctic Ocean. In 2015, one million acres of the Hanna Shoal region (defined by the 40-meter depth contour line) were removed from consideration for future oil and gas leasing activities. In addition, the 2017–2022 Outer Continental Shelf (OCS) Oil and Gas Leasing Program Draft Programmatic Environmental Impact Statement (DPEIS) recognized the Hanna Shoal Walrus Foraging Area and Walrus Movement Corridor as Environmentally Important Areas

So far, attempted oil and gas development near the shoal has been unproductive. In 2015, one well was completed at the Burger prospect, roughly 10 miles from the Hanna Shoal important area. That well was unsuccessful, and as of July 2016, oil companies have relinquished all but one lease in the Chukchi Sea.
