= Dispute over the extended continental shelf in the Southern Zone Sea between Argentina and Chile =

Argentina and Chile sea border dispute

Map of the dispute.

The dispute over the extended continental shelf in the Southern Zone Sea between Argentina and Chile is a disagreement between the two countries over a maritime area of 5,302 km^{2} that began after Argentina attempted to extend its maritime space based on the theory of the extended continental shelf over the Southern Zone Sea (Spanish: Mar de la Zona Austral), south of Point F as agreed in the 1984 treaty, in an area claimed by Chile as part of its "presential sea", and now as part of its continental shelf (not extended) projected from the Diego Ramírez Islands.

Previously, Argentina claimed the overlapping "crescent-shaped" area as a "heritage protection sea". For its part, Chile has understood that marine continental shelves should prevail over extended continental shelves, a position supported by the interpretation presented by the International Court of Justice in its 2023 ruling on the delimitation of the continental shelf in the context of the Colombia-Nicaragua case.

The dispute also involves both countries' projections towards the Antarctic continent. Under the terms of the United Nations Convention on the Law of the Sea Article 59 disputed and overlapping claims have no legal force until the dispute is resolved between the opposing parties.

UNCLOS is an advisory commission that makes recommendations which are not legally binding, and the commission has no jurisdiction over sovereignty issues.

== History ==
The United Nations Convention on the Law of the Sea (UNCLOS) of April 30, 1982, which entered into force on November 16, 1994, established the regime of the continental shelf in Part VI (Articles 76 to 85), defining in Article 76, paragraph 1 what is understood as a continental shelf.

Argentina ratified the convention on January 12, 1995, and it came into force for the country on December 31, 1995.

On August 25, 1997, Chile signed and ratified the United Nations Convention on the Law of the Sea, and it entered into force for the country on September 24, 1997.

In 2009, Argentina submitted a presentation to the United Nations Commission on the Limits of the Continental Shelf, which was accepted in 2016 by the UNCLOS. The map in the submission included the disputed territories with the United Kingdom, such as the Falkland Islands, South Georgia, and South Sandwich Islands, a crescent-shaped area south of Argentina's territorial sea as defined in the 1984 treaty with Chile. This area was also claimed by Chile as part of its presential sea, and the sea surrounding the Antarctic Peninsula, which is claimed by all three aforementioned countries. That same year, on May 8, Chile submitted its Preliminary Report to the United Nations Commission on the Limits of the Continental Shelf.

In 2020, the Argentine Chamber of Deputies unanimously approved the outer limit of the Argentine Continental Shelf in Law 27,557.

That same year, on December 21, Chile submitted to the United Nations Commission on the Limits of the Continental Shelf the partial report on the extended continental shelf in Easter Island and Salas y Gómez.

In 2021, Chilean President Sebastián Piñera signed Supreme Decree No. 95, which outlined the continental shelf east of the 67º 16' 0 meridian as part of Chile's continental shelf (not the extended one) area projected from the Diego Ramírez Islands, also claiming the crescent area that Argentina considers part of its extension achieved under the extended continental shelf principle. This was reflected in the SHOA Chart No. 8 and prompted a response from the Argentine Foreign Ministry against Chile's measure.

In February 2022, Chile submitted its second partial presentation regarding the Western Continental Shelf of the Chilean Antarctic Territory. In August of the same year, Chile made the oral presentations of both partial submissions during the 55th Session of the Commission on the Limits of the Continental Shelf at the United Nations in New York.

In 2023, Chile, through SHOA, made available an illustrative graphic showing all the maritime areas claimed by the country, which was once again rejected by Argentina.

In July 2023, the International Court of Justice ruled on the priority of a Continental Shelf over an Extended Continental Shelf in the case of the territorial and maritime dispute between Colombia and Nicaragua.

== Background ==
The creation and implementation of this legal concept, which allows coastal states to enjoy exclusive rights over vast oceanic territories, stems from the United Nations Convention on the Law of the Sea (UNCLOS), specifically in Part VI. This multilateral treaty was approved in April 1982 and came into force on 16 November 1994, a year after its ratification by Guyana, which fulfilled the requirement that at least 60 signatory states ratify it.

The regulations developed and issued by UNCLOS have global application. The meeting of the states that are part of the convention established the Commission on the Limits of the Continental Shelf (CLCS), and the validation of the commission gives political and legal legitimacy. This commission is based at the United Nations headquarters in New York.

For a coastal state to acquire rights over scientific continental shelves, it must rigorously follow specific steps. First, it must submit a detailed report to the CLCS, in which the state must demonstrate its rights over a specific area, outlined in a cartographic presentation. This process must consider the scientific-technical guidelines established by UNCLOS, and the report must be based on extensive data collection, including surveys and various scientific analyses, such as gravimetric, bathymetric, magnetometric, geological, geophysical, morphological, seismic, sedimentological studies, etc. Specialists in multiple disciplines, including oceanography, hydrography, geography, cartography, law, and international law, participate in this effort.

The CLCS, through a subcommission of seven members from a total of 21 technical experts in hydrography, geophysics, and geology, reviews the claim. They carefully examine the state's arguments, the technical data, and the accompanying maps. The commission can request clarifying meetings, make recommendations for modifications, or provide scientific-technical advice, potentially reprocessing the submitted data.

After completing the analysis, the subcommission issues draft recommendations, which are then approved by the full commission. If the state follows these recommendations, the new limits are validated. If the commission finds excessive extensions, it may recommend adjustments, leaving disputed sections in suspense. The state may accept or revise its claim, and after further review, the commission may finally validate the submission.

Under UNCLOS Article 76.8, once the CLCS validates a state's outer limit, it is definitive and binding, enforceable against third-party states, and internationally mandatory.

Legally, the boundary is drawn by the state itself, with the CLCS only providing recommendations to ensure compliance with UNCLOS requirements. This ensures that the extension aligns with the rights developed under the convention.

The coastal state will submit to the secretary-general of the United Nations cartography, geodetic data, and additional information describing the new outer limit, permanently established, who upon receiving them will give them appropriate dissemination so that such limits are respected by the community of nations.

=== Formulas for measuring the outer edge of the continental margin ===
Schematic cross section of a continental shelf. Sediment Rock Mantle

UNCLOS, in Article 76, established complex scientific-technical guidelines that all coastal states must follow when estimating the extent of their continental shelf. These guidelines are synthesized into a combination of 4 rules—2 formulas and 2 restrictions. These standards were debated and agreed upon over several years, finally being approved in New York City on 13 May 1999, during the fifth session.

The procedure for states wishing to expand their maritime area begins with locating the foot of the continental slope, defined as the point of greatest change in gradient at its base. Once this point is identified, formula lines are drawn to find the farthest outer envelope, which will correspond to the outer edge of the continental shelf that the state intends to defend. Each state will choose the formula to use in each section, applying the most convenient based on seabed features and distances, to achieve the greatest possible extension of exclusive continental shelf.

Each formula was proposed by a geologist, and its technical name bears the scientist's last name:

=== Criteria in cases of disputed maritime territories ===
The procedures established by UNCLOS are based on the principle that "land dominates the sea", meaning the status of maritime spaces legitimated by its bodies derives from the status of the coastal landmasses. If the CLCS encounters overlapping jurisdiction claims or pending conflicts during the extension process—i.e., ocean areas claimed by two or more countries, including those projected from disputed islands—any submission concerning those areas will not be examined or evaluated, as the commission cannot intervene on the substantive issue. Instead, the tracing or definitive allocation will be postponed, subject to the outcome of other legal bodies or negotiation mechanisms appropriate to the nature of these disputes, such as treaties, settlements, negotiations between the parties, mediation, rulings from international courts, etc.

== See also ==
- Continental shelf
- Extended continental shelf
- United Nations Convention on the Law of the Sea
- Continental Shelf of Chile
- Chilean Sea
- Argentine Sea
- Beagle conflict
- Treaty of Peace and Friendship of 1984 between Chile and Argentina
- Southern Patagonian Ice Field dispute
