= Southern Zone Sea =

Sea in the southernmost territories of South America

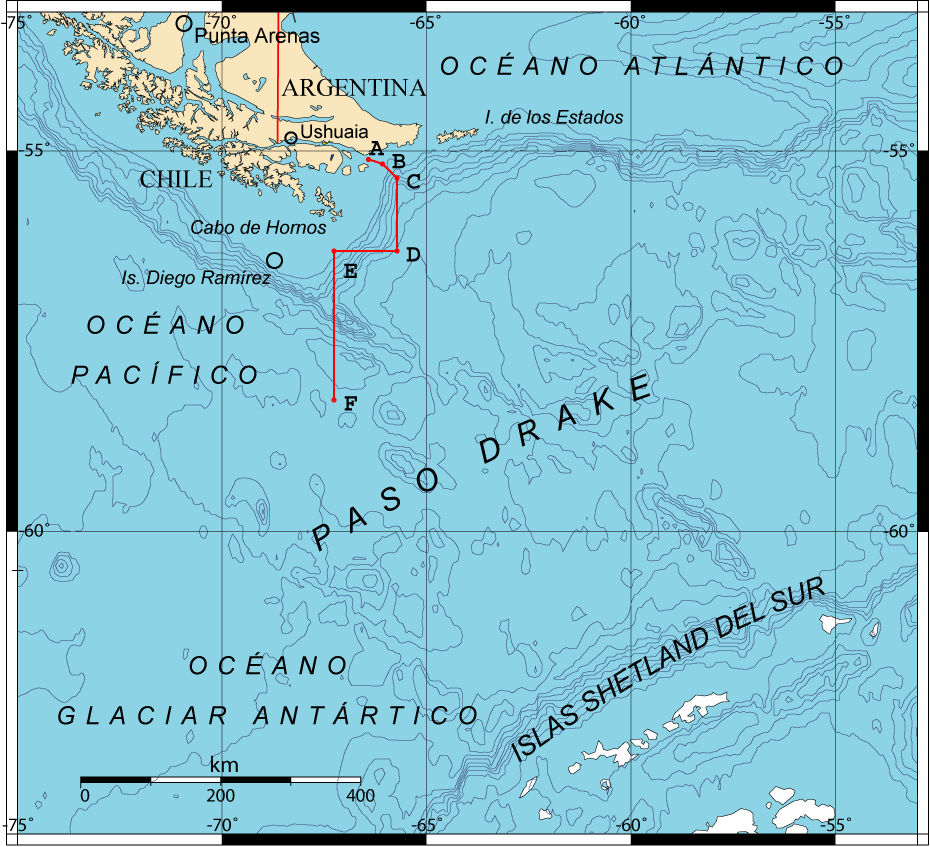
Map of the Sea of the Southern Zone with points A, B, C, D, E, and F defined in the 1984 Treaty of Peace and Friendship between Argentina and Chile, used to delimit their maritime boundary

The Sea of the Southern Zone (Spanish: Mar de la Zona Austral) or Southern Zone Sea is the name given by Argentina and Chile to the maritime area whose boundaries were undefined, located south of the Isla Grande de Tierra del Fuego. This maritime space was subject to delimitation in the Treaty of Peace and Friendship of 1984 between Chile and Argentina, which ended the Beagle conflict or "Southern Zone conflict."

The definition of this maritime area was constrained by the necessity for the parties ratifying the treaty to avoid referring to the area under delimitation as part of either the Atlantic Ocean or the Pacific Ocean, since the two countries could not agree on its affiliation to one ocean or the other. After the signing of the treaty in 1984 and its ratification in 1985, the name "Sea of the Southern Zone" has been largely ignored in both countries, which continue to use their traditional names in cartographic representations of the area. For this reason, parts of this sea are sometimes linked to the Argentine Sea, Chilean Sea or the Drake Passage.

The name "Sea of the Southern Zone" has not been adopted internationally, and the International Hydrographic Organization did not include the Sea of the Southern Zone in the draft of the 4th edition of its publication Limits of Oceans and Seas, issued via Circular CL55 of 7 November 2001 (the 3rd edition dates from 1953). In this draft, Chile, in agreement with Russia and the United Kingdom, proposed as the northern limit of the Drake Passage the line connecting Waterman Island, Cape Horn, Cape San Bartolomé on Isla de los Estados, and the southern coast of that island to Cape San Juan de Salvamento, clearly overlapping areas under the delimitation of the Sea of the Southern Zone.

== Boundaries ==
The boundaries of the Sea of the Southern Zone have only been precisely defined in its northern part, where it reaches the shores of Isla de los Estados from its eastern extremity, the mouth of the Le Maire Strait, and the coast on the Isla Grande de Tierra del Fuego to the eastern mouth of the Beagle Channel at Cape San Pío. To the west, it extends at least to the Chilean straight baselines — though it is unclear whether it extends further west — which skirt the southeast coast of Isla Nueva, the Evout and Barnevelt islets, Deceit Island, and Hornos Island, continuing south to the meridian of Cape Horn. The eastern boundary has not been defined, reaching at least the polygonal line defined in the treaty between points A and E, leaving the connection between point F of the polygon and the eastern extremity of Isla de los Estados undefined. It is not specified whether it extends to the limit of the Argentine exclusive economic zone that was part of the conflict.

== Delimitation between the Pacific and South Atlantic oceans by the Shackleton fracture zone ==
Map showing a proposed delimitation between the Pacific and South Atlantic oceans by the Shackleton fracture zone

Researchers have proposed that the separation of the Pacific and Atlantic Ocean oceans "could be confirmed from the so-called Shackleton fracture zone ... the boundary is then located east of the so-called Cape Horn Meridian".

== Dispute over the extended continental shelf ==
Map of the dispute

The United Nations Convention on the Law of the Sea (UNCLOS) of April 30, 1982, which entered into force on November 16, 1994, established the regime of the continental shelf in Part VI (Articles 76 to 85), defining in Article 76, paragraph 1 what is understood as a continental shelf.

Argentina ratified the convention on January 12, 1995, and it came into force for the country on December 31, 1995.

On August 25, 1997, Chile signed and ratified the United Nations Convention on the Law of the Sea, and it entered into force for the country on September 24, 1997.

In 2009, Argentina submitted a presentation to the United Nations Commission on the Limits of the Continental Shelf, which was accepted in 2016 by the UNCLOS. The map in the submission included the disputed territories with the United Kingdom, such as the Falkland Islands, South Georgia, and South Sandwich Islands, a crescent-shaped area south of Argentina's territorial sea as defined in the 1984 treaty with Chile. This area was also claimed by Chile as part of its presential sea, and the sea surrounding the Antarctic Peninsula, which is claimed by all three aforementioned countries. That same year, on May 8, Chile submitted its Preliminary Report to the United Nations Commission on the Limits of the Continental Shelf.

In 2020, the Argentine Chamber of Deputies unanimously approved the outer limit of the Argentine Continental Shelf in Law 27,557.

That same year, on December 21, Chile submitted to the United Nations Commission on the Limits of the Continental Shelf the partial report on the extended continental shelf in Easter Island and Salas y Gómez.

In 2021, Chilean President Sebastián Piñera signed Supreme Decree No. 95, which outlined the continental shelf east of the 67º 16' 0 meridian as part of Chile's continental shelf (not the extended one) area projected from the Diego Ramírez Islands, also claiming the crescent area that Argentina considers part of its extension achieved under the extended continental shelf principle. This was reflected in the SHOA Chart No. 8 and prompted a response from the Argentine Foreign Ministry against Chile's measure.

In February 2022, Chile submitted its second partial presentation regarding the Western Continental Shelf of the Chilean Antarctic Territory. In August of the same year, Chile made the oral presentations of both partial submissions during the 55th Session of the Commission on the Limits of the Continental Shelf at the United Nations in New York.

In 2023, Chile, through SHOA, made available an illustrative graphic showing all the maritime areas claimed by the country, which was once again rejected by Argentina.

In July 2023, the International Court of Justice ruled on the priority of a Continental Shelf over a Extended Continental Shelf in the case of the territorial and maritime dispute between Colombia and Nicaragua.
