= Continental shelf of Chile =

Seabed and subsoil of submarine areas extending beyond Chile's coast

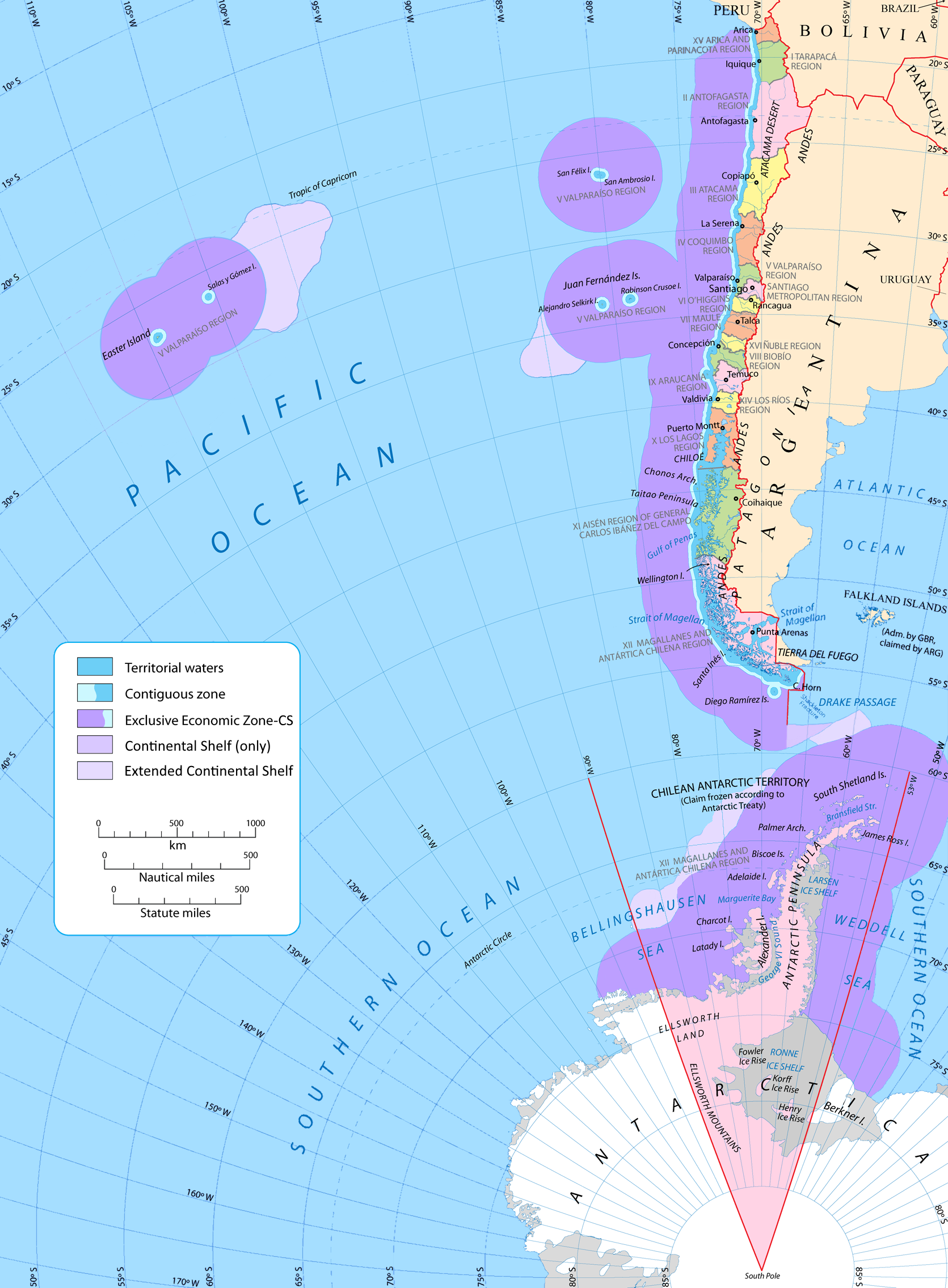
Tricontinental Chile, the exclusive economic zone, continental shelf, and the extended continental shelf

The continental shelf of Chile is the underwater extension adjacent to the Chilean coasts that stretches from the shoreline to the edge of the continental shelf in the Pacific Ocean and the Southern Ocean.

The scientific study and delimitation of the continental shelf and its outer limit are conducted by the National Committee for the Continental Shelf, established in 2007.

The delimitation of Chile's continental shelf follows principles established by the United Nations Convention on the Law of the Sea (UNCLOS), which sets guidelines for the delineation of continental shelves by coastal states. Chile has submitted claims to the United Nations Commission on the Limits of the Continental Shelf.

Apart from its economic importance, the continental shelf also holds geopolitical significance. Its delimitation has occasionally led to tensions with neighboring countries, particularly Argentina, which also claims rights over adjacent maritime areas. Decisions and presentations made to the UN have influenced bilateral relations and Chile's maritime policies, making the continental shelf a critical issue in the country's security and defense agenda.

== Scientific studies and Chilean submissions ==
=== In Insular Chile ===
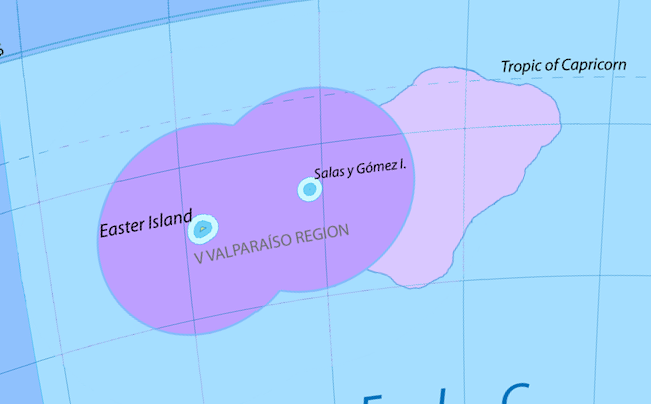
Easter Island and Salas y Gómez Island and its waters. Exclusive Economic Zone and Continental Shelf Extended Continental Shelf

The extended continental shelf of Insular Chile extends 700 nautical miles east of Salas y Gómez Island.

On December 21, 2020, Chile submitted a partial report on the extended continental shelf around Easter Island and Salas y Gómez to the UN Commission on the Limits of the Continental Shelf.

On July 29, 2026, Chile submitted a request to the UN to extend the continental shelf of the Juan Fernández archipelago, aiming to expand its national territory by 71,000 square kilometers of seabed and subsoil.

=== In Continental Chile ===
Continental shelf of Chile in the Southern Zone Sea

According to the principle that "the coastal State exercises over the continental shelf sovereign rights," the continental shelf of Continental Chile encompasses the entirety of its territorial sea and its Exclusive Economic Zone, except for the 200 nautical miles projected from the Diego Ramírez Islands in the Southern Zone Sea, which extend east of the meridian marking the border between Argentina and Chile. These fall under the category of the continental shelf but not the Exclusive Economic Zone due to the 1984 treaty between Argentina and Chile, nor does it constitute a claim for an extended continental shelf.

Additionally, between the mentioned continental shelf and the waters projected from the Antarctic territory, Chile claims a maritime sector as an extended continental shelf.

=== In Antarctic Chile ===
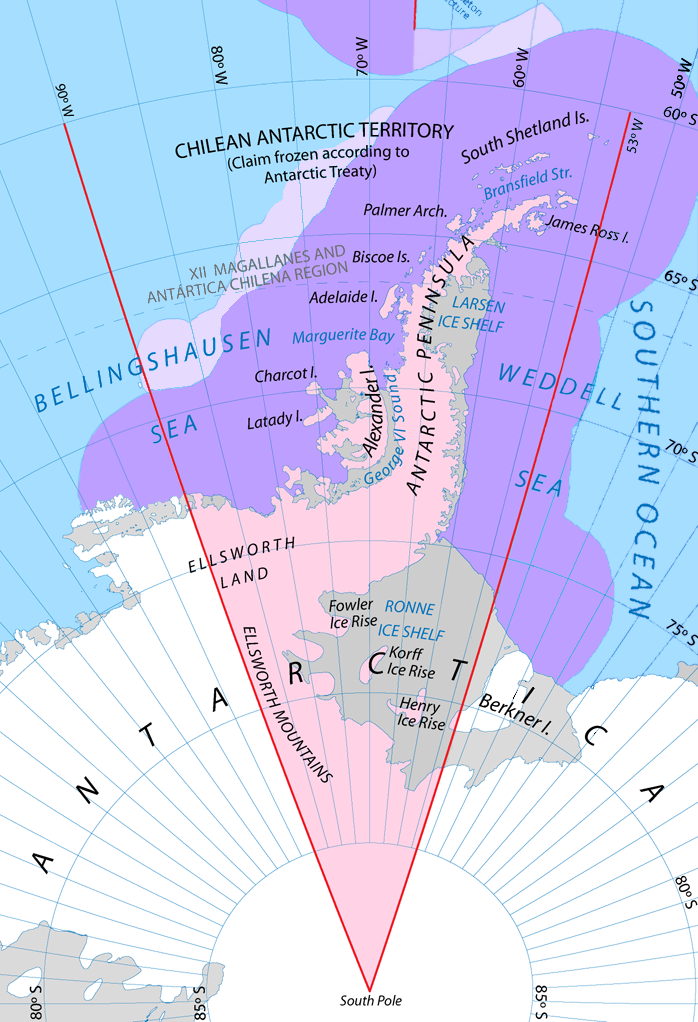
Antarctic Chile and its waters. Exclusive Economic Zone and Continental Shelf Continental Shelf (only) Extended Continental Shelf

In February 2022, Chile submitted its second partial presentation regarding the Extended Continental Shelf to the west of the Chilean Antarctic Territory. In August of the same year, oral presentations of both partial submissions were made during the 55th Session of the UN Commission on the Limits of the Continental Shelf in New York. Apart from the extended continental shelf, Chile claims the Exclusive Economic Zone and Continental Shelf projected from the Chilean Antarctic Territory.

=== National Committee for the Continental Shelf ===
On December 3, 2007, through Decree N° 164, Chile established the National Committee for the Continental Shelf.

=== SHOA Charts ===
In 2021, the Chilean President Sebastián Piñera signed Supreme Decree N° 95, specifying the continental shelf to the east of the 67º 16' 0 meridian as part of Chile's (non-extended) continental shelf, projected from the Diego Ramírez Islands. The decree also claimed the crescent-shaped area that Argentina considers part of its extended continental shelf. This was formalized in SHOA Chart N° 8 and prompted a response from the Argentine foreign ministry against Chile's measure.

In 2023, Chile, through SHOA, released an illustrative graphic showing all maritime spaces claimed by the country.

== Convemar ==
The United Nations Convention on the Law of the Sea (Convemar) of April 30, 1982, which entered into force on November 16, 1994, established the regime of the continental shelf in Part VI (articles 76 to 85), defining in Article 76, paragraph 1 what is meant by the continental shelf:

The continental shelf of a coastal State comprises the bed and subsoil of the submarine areas that extend beyond its territorial sea and along the natural prolongation of its territory to the outer edge of the continental margin, or to a distance of 200 nautical miles (370 km) measured from the baseline from which the breadth of the territorial sea is measured, in cases where the outer edge of the continental margin does not reach that distance.

Schematic cross-section of a continental shelf. Sediment Rock Mantle

The continental shelf is the submerged prolongation of a state's landmass to the outer edge of the continental margin, or up to 200 nautical miles (370 km) measured from the baseline if the outer edge of the continental margin does not reach that distance, regardless of the geological or geomorphological conditions of that extension or whether the geological continental shelf extends to that point. On the continental shelf, the coastal State exercises exclusive sovereignty rights for the exploration and exploitation of the natural resources there (Article 77 of Convemar). The ocean floors beyond the limits established by states are under the jurisdiction of the International Seabed Authority and are considered for the benefit of all humanity. The deep ocean floor with its ocean ridges and its subsoil is outside the jurisdiction of states.

On August 25, 1997, Chile signed and ratified the United Nations Convention on the Law of the Sea, entering into force for the country on September 24, 1997.

The possibility for coastal states to extend their extended continental shelf beyond 200 nautical miles has been contemplated by Convemar for certain cases specified in Article 76. States interested in making that extension must submit a substantiated presentation to the Continental Shelf Limits Commission (CLCS), which must then evaluate and provide recommendations for establishing the outer limit of that state's continental shelf.

To establish the extent of the outer edge of the continental margin and, therefore, the outer limit of the extended continental shelf beyond 200 nautical miles (370 km), two criteria are used, defined in Article 74, paragraph 4 of Convemar: 1) A line drawn, in accordance with Article 76, paragraph 7, in relation to the most distant fixed points in each of which the thickness of the sedimentary rocks is at least 1% of the shortest distance between that point and the foot of the continental slope. 2) A line drawn, in accordance with Article 76, paragraph 7, in relation to fixed points located no more than 60 nautical miles from the foot of the continental slope.

Article 76, paragraph 5 also establishes two restrictions. The fixed points that constitute the outer limit of the extended continental shelf, drawn according to the criteria mentioned above, must not exceed 350 nautical miles (650 km) or 100 nautical miles (190 km) from the isobath of 2500 meters (the line connecting depths of 2500 meters). The points must be connected by straight lines, with a maximum length of 60 nautical miles (111 km).

The limits of the extended continental shelf do not affect the legal status of the superjacent waters or the airspace above such waters, according to Article 78, paragraph 1.

On May 8, 2009, Chile presented its Preliminary Report to the United Nations Commission on the Limits of the Continental Shelf.

In July 2023, the International Court of Justice ruled on the prevalence of a Continental Shelf over an Extended Continental Shelf in the territorial and maritime delimitation dispute between Colombia and Nicaragua.

== Boundary with Argentina and dispute over the "Crescent" ==
Map of the dispute.

The maritime boundary between Argentina and Chile is established in Article 7 of the Treaty of Peace and Friendship of 1984:

The boundary between the respective sovereignties over the sea, soil, and subsoil of the Argentine Republic and the Republic of Chile in the Southern Sea, starting from the end of the existing delimitation in the Beagle Channel, that is, the point fixed by coordinates 55° 07',3 South latitude and 66° 25',0 West longitude, will be the line that connects the following points:

From the point fixed by coordinates 55° 07',3 South latitude and 66° 25',0 West longitude (point A), the delimitation will follow southeast along a loxodromic line to a point located between the coasts of Nueva Island and the Grande Island of Tierra del Fuego, with coordinates 55° 11',0 South latitude and 66° 04',7 West longitude (point B); from there it will continue southeast at a 45-degree angle, measured at point B, and extend to the point with coordinates 55° 22',9 South latitude and 65° 43',6 West longitude (point C); it will continue directly south along that meridian to the parallel 56° 22',8 South latitude (point D); from there it will continue along this parallel 24 nautical miles south of the southernmost point of Hornos Island, westward to its intersection with the meridian corresponding to the southernmost point of Hornos Island at coordinates 56° 22',8 South latitude and 67° 16',0 West longitude (point E); from there the boundary will continue south to the point with coordinates 58° 21',1 South latitude and 67° 16',0 West longitude (point F).
...

The Exclusive Economic Zones of the Argentine Republic and the Republic of Chile will extend respectively to the east and west of the boundary as described. To the south of the final boundary point (point F), the Exclusive Economic Zone of the Republic of Chile will extend, to the extent permitted by international law, westward of meridian 67° 16',0 West longitude, delineating to the east with the high seas.

According to the treaty, for the establishment of Argentina's exclusive economic zone southeast of the meridian of Cape Horn, the 200 nautical miles are counted from the coast of Isla Grande de Tierra del Fuego without considering the Chilean islands that intervene. Although the treaty does not explicitly mention the limit of the continental shelf south of point F, Argentina presented an extension beyond 200 nautical miles east of the Cape Horn meridian. In 2021, Chile presented a map of its continental shelf based on 200 nautical miles from Diego Ramírez Islands and not as an extended continental shelf. The first takes precedence over the second as expressed by the International Court of Justice in the territorial and maritime delimitation dispute between Colombia and Nicaragua.

Before Argentina claimed the crescent-shaped area as an extended continental shelf, that section was considered open sea.

== Border with Peru ==
Map of the maritime (since 2014) and land border between Chile and Peru.

After a maritime boundary dispute, the International Court of Justice of The Hague issued its ruling in 2014, establishing the common maritime border definitively. It begins at the point where the geographic parallel passing through Landmark N° 1 intersects the low tide line, and from there extends for 80 nautical miles. Then, it continues in a southwest direction along an equidistant line from the coasts of both countries until it intersects with the 200 nautical mile limit measured from the base lines of Chile, and then continues south to the point of intersection with the 200 nautical mile limit measured from the base lines of both countries. The Court defined the course of the maritime boundary without determining the precise geographical coordinates, and ordered that the parties should proceed to determine such coordinates in accordance with the ruling, which occurred on March 25, 2014.

Precise geographical coordinates of the points constituting the maritime boundary between Peru and Chile
Name	Coordinates
Starting point of the maritime boundary (PIFM)	18°21′00.42″S 70°22′49.80″W
Point A	18°21′00.42″S 71°46′56.23″W
Intermediate point N° I-1	18°37′46.94″S 72°02′01.13″W
Intermediate point N° I-2	18°53′23.91″S 72°20′24.42″W
Intermediate point N° I-3	19°17′23.40″S 72°47′33.04″W
Intermediate point N° I-4	19°21′03.52″S 72°51′48.05″W
Intermediate point N° I-5	19°24′08.15″S 72°55′39.04″W
Intermediate point N° I-6	19°52′42.20″S 73°36′12.17″W
Point B	19°58′24.38″S 73°45′11.78″W
Point C	20°11′54.41″S 73°43′50.58″W

== Theories of natural delimitation between the Atlantic and Pacific oceans ==
Map showing a proposed natural delimitation between the Pacific and South Atlantic oceans by the Shackleton fracture zone

Researchers have proposed the theory that the separation of the Pacific and Atlantic oceans "could be confirmed from the so-called Shackleton fracture zone ... the boundary is then located to the east of the so-called Horns of Cape Meridian."

Additionally, the theory of the natural delimitation between the Pacific and South Atlantic oceans by the Scotia Arc was previously proposed.

== See also ==
- Chilean Sea
- Extended continental shelf
- Continental shelf of the United States
- Continental shelf of Russia
