= Treaty of Peace and Friendship of 1984 between Chile and Argentina =

Argentina-Chile border treaty

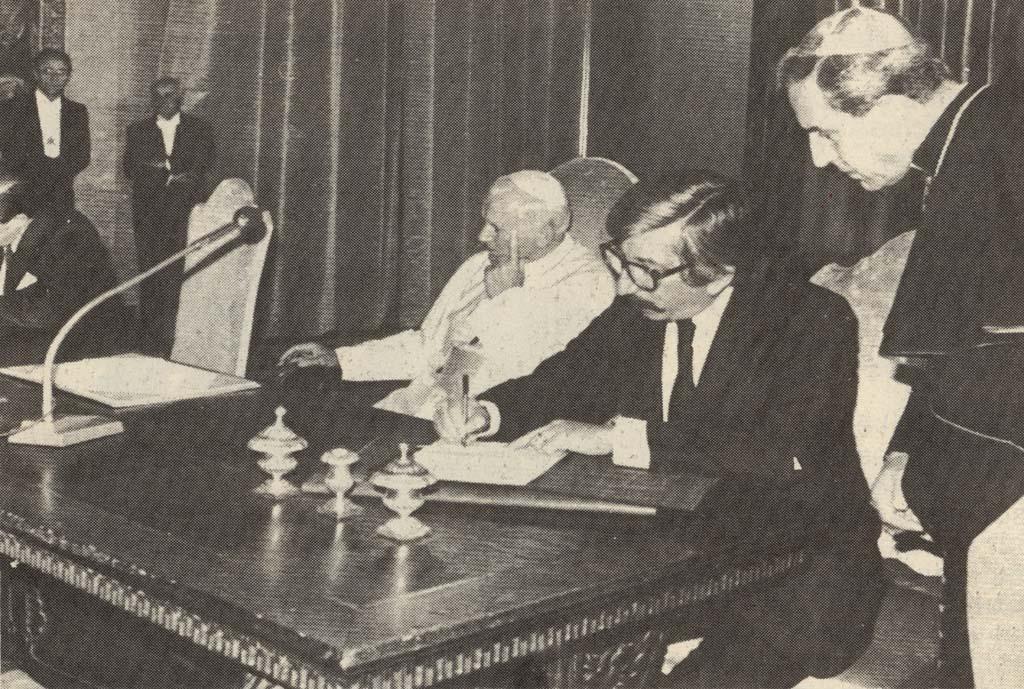
- Signing of the Treaty of Peace and Friendship between Argentina and Chile.
- Type: Border treaty
- Context: Beagle conflict
- Signed: November 29, 1984
- Location: Vatican City
- Sealed: May 2, 1985
- Mediators: (Vatican City) Pope John Paul II
- Signatories: (Argentina) Raúl Alfonsín; (Chile) Augusto Pinochet
- Parties: Argentina; Chile
- Language: Spanish

Full text
- es:Tratado de Paz y Amistad entre Argentina y Chile de 1984 at Wikisource

The Treaty of Peace and Friendship of 1984 between Chile and Argentina (Spanish: Tratado de Paz y Amistad de 1984 entre Chile y Argentina, see the text in the United Nations) was signed into agreement at the Vatican on 29 November 1984.

It was ratified

- on 30 December 1984 by the Argentine Chamber of Deputies;
- on 15 March 1985 by the Argentine National Congress;
- on 16 March 1985 by the Interim representative of the President of Argentina, who was abroad;
- on 11 April 1985 by the Chilean Military Government Junta as Legislature.

On 12 April 1985 it was signed by Augusto Pinochet, and on 2 May 1985 the Foreign Ministers of both countries exchanged original documents. Due to the timing, the treaty is variously known as the 1984 Treaty or the 1985 Treaty.

The treaty contains a preamble, a maritime border definition, a comprehensive body of legislation on solving disputes, ship navigation rights and an exact definition of the border through the Straits of Magellan. Chile and Argentina, though never at war with each other, have named some of their border treaties as "peace treaties".

== Genesis of the treaty ==
The treaty ended the Beagle conflict and was the result of long-standing negotiations between Chile, Argentina and the Vatican as mediator. The outcome of the Falklands War made the treaty possible. When consulted in a non-binding referendum on resolving the conflict by then-President Raúl Alfonsín, 82% of Argentine population voted in favor of signing the treaty.

== The Preamble ==
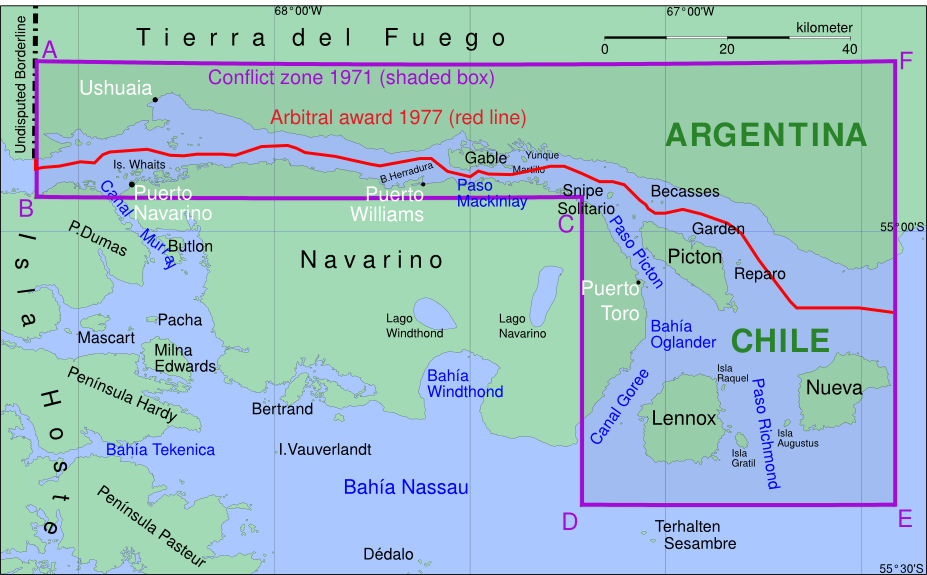
Existing boundary in the Beagle Channel (red line) determined in the 1977 arbitral award, rejected by Argentina 1977 and accepted in 1984

The treaty recognizes the Boundary Treaty of 1881 between Chile and Argentina and its «…supplementary and declaratory instruments…» as the unshakeable foundation of relations between Chile and Argentina and defines the border «…from the end of the existing boundary in the Beagle Channel, i.e., the point fixed by the coordinates 55°07.3' South latitude and 66°25.0' West longitude…» (Bold by Wikipedia). That is, Argentina recognizes the borderline determined by the Beagle Channel Arbitration in 1977 (Report and Decision of the Court of Arbitration), which it had earlier rejected. Hence, there is no mention of Picton, Nueva, Lennox and other islands. The Treaty calls its content a Transaction.

Excepting articles 1 to 6, which define a comprehensive body of legislation regarding dispute resolution, the other provisions shall not affect in any way, nor may they be interpreted in any way, that can affect, directly or indirectly, the sovereignty, rights, juridical positions of the Parties, or the boundaries in Antarctica or in its adjacent maritime areas, including the seabed and subsoil.

== The maritime border ==
The Beagle Conflict and its maritime projection.

Point	Latitude	Longitude
A	55°07',3	66°25',0
B	55°11',0	66°04',7
C	55°22',9	65°43',6
D	56°22',8	65°43',6
E	56°22',8	67°16',0
F	58°21',1	67°16',0

The international maritime border is the line ABCDEF. Westward are Chilean waters; eastward are Argentine waters.

Both countries mutually recognized its baselines. (The Chilean Baseline can be seen here.) From the Cape Horn Meridian (67°16',0 West) to the east end of the Isla de los Estados both countries reduced their internal waters to 3 nmi (5.6 km) only in their mutual relations.

The line ABCDEF gives most of the exclusive economic zone of the islands (eastwards of Cape Horn) previously in dispute to Argentina. On the map, the gray line is approximately equidistant between the shores of Chile and Argentina. Such an equidistant line is normally how maritime borders are drawn between two countries, though this approach is not compulsory.

== Navigation rights ==
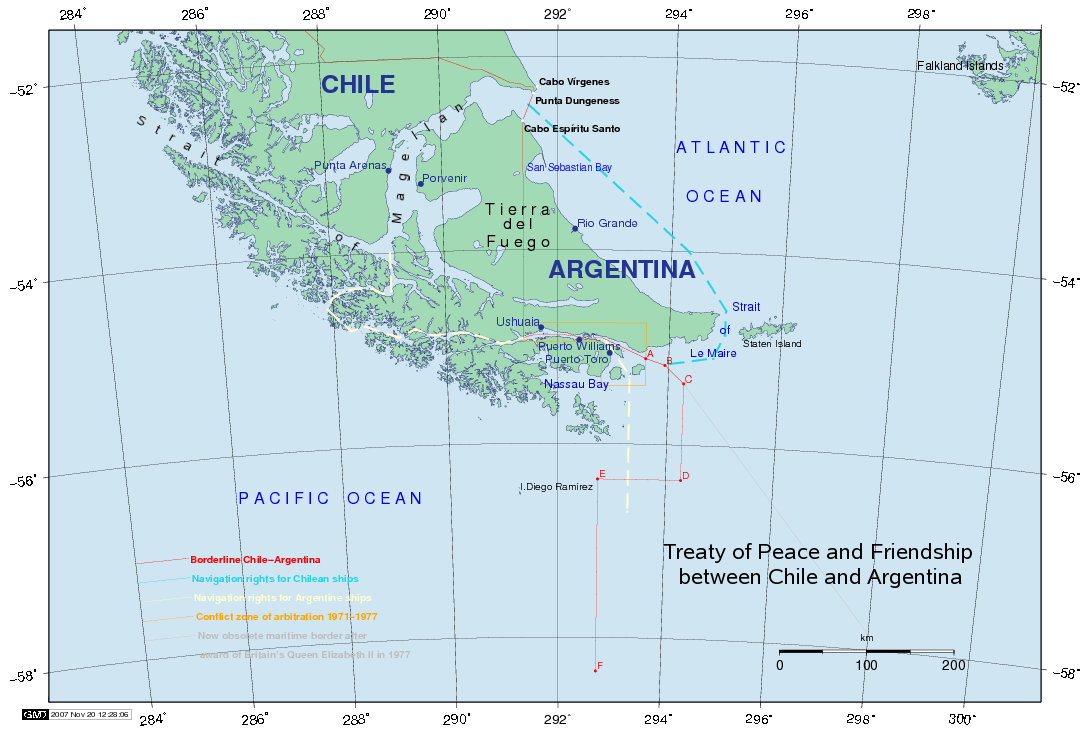
The Treaty of Peace and Friendship on the map.

Vessels of all nations in traffic between the Straits of Magellan and Argentine ports in the Beagle Channel, and vice versa, enjoy navigation facilities exclusively along the following route through Chilean internal waters: Magdalena Channel, Canal Cockburn, Paso Brecknock or Canal Occasion, Canal Ballenero, Canal O'Brien, Paso Timbales, northwest arm of the Beagle Channel and the Beagle Channel as far as the meridian 68°36'38.5" West longitude and vice versa. The passage shall be navigated with a Chilean pilot and the Chilean Authority shall be informed at least 48 hours in advance of the date on which the vessel will begin passage.

For maritime traffic between Argentine ports in the Beagle Channel and the Argentine Exclusive Economic Zone (or Antarctic), and vice versa, Argentine vessels shall enjoy navigation facilities for the passage through Chilean internal waters exclusively via the following route: Paso Picton and Paso Richmond, then following from a point fixed by the coordinates 55'21.0' South latitude and 66'41.0" West longitude, the general direction of the arc between true 090' and 180', emerging in the Chilean territorial sea; or crossing the Chilean territorial sea in the general direction of the arc between true 270' and 000', and continuing through Paso Richmond and Paso Picton. The passage may be effected without a Chilean pilot and without notice.

For maritime traffic to and from the north through the Le Maire Strait, Chilean vessels shall enjoy navigation facilities for the passage of that strait, without an Argentine pilot and without notice.

== The Strait of Magellan ==
The Straits of Magellan belong, since the Treaty of 1881, to Chile. The Straits are a demilitarized zone and free for navigation for vessels of all countries.

New in respect thereof is that the Argentine Republic undertakes to maintain, at any time and in whatever circumstances, the right of ships of all flags to navigate expeditiously and without obstacles through its jurisdictional waters to and from the Straits of Magellan.

The Parties give mutual recognition to the baselines which they have traced in their respective territories. That is, regarding the Straits of Magellan, Argentina recognizes that the Straits of Magellan have no delta at the western end and that the Channels Abra, Magdalena, Cockburn and others are Chilean internal waters as defined by the Chilean baselines and that they are not free for navigation.

The parties agree that at the eastern end of the Straits of Magellan, defined by Punta Dúngeness in the north and Cabo del Espiritu Santo in the south, the boundary between their respective sovereignties shall be the straight line joining the "Dungeness Marker (Former Beacon)", located at the very tip of the said geographical feature, and "Marker I on Cabo del Espiritu Santo" in Tierra del Fuego. The sovereignty of Chile and Argentina over the sea, seabed and subsoil shall extend, respectively, to the west and east of this boundary. This commitment ends any Chilean projection over the Atlantic and any Argentine pretension to coregulate traffic in the Straits of Magellan.

== Dispute resolution ==
The parties reiterate solemnly their commitment to preserve, strengthen and develop their unchanging ties of perpetual friendship and to refrain from resorting directly or indirectly to any form of threat or use of force and from adopting any other measures which may disturb the peace in any sector of their mutual relations.

They create a Conciliation Commission and, if it fails, eventually an Arbitral Tribunal. The decision of the tribunal shall be binding on the Parties, final and unappealable. Its implementation shall be entrusted to the honour of the nations signing the Treaty of Peace and Friendship.

== Southern Zone Sea ==
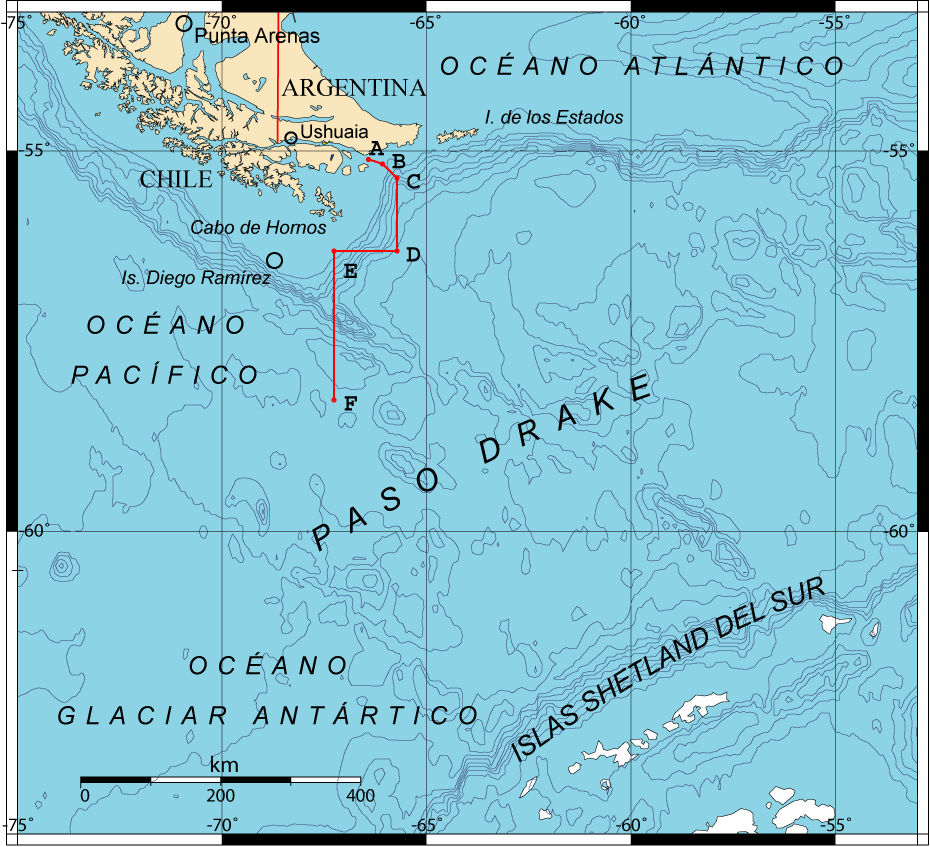
Map of the Sea of the Southern Zone with points A, B, C, D, E, and F defined in the 1984 Treaty of Peace and Friendship between Argentina and Chile, used to delimit their maritime boundary

The Sea of the Southern Zone (Spanish: Mar de la Zona Austral) or Southern Zone Sea is the name given by Argentina and Chile to the maritime area whose boundaries were undefined, located south of the Isla Grande de Tierra del Fuego. This maritime space was subject to delimitation in the Treaty of Peace and Friendship of 1984 between Chile and Argentina, which ended the Beagle conflict or "Southern Zone conflict."

The definition of this maritime area was constrained by the necessity for the parties ratifying the treaty to avoid referring to the area under delimitation as part of either the Atlantic Ocean or the Pacific Ocean, since the two countries could not agree on its affiliation to one ocean or the other. After the signing of the treaty in 1984 and its ratification in 1985, the name "Sea of the Southern Zone" has been largely ignored in both countries, which continue to use their traditional names in cartographic representations of the area. For this reason, parts of this sea are sometimes linked to the Argentine Sea, Chilean Sea or the Drake Passage.

The name "Sea of the Southern Zone" has not been adopted internationally, and the International Hydrographic Organization did not include the Sea of the Southern Zone in the draft of the 4th edition of its publication Limits of Oceans and Seas, issued via Circular CL55 of 7 November 2001 (the 3rd edition dates from 1953). In this draft, Chile, in agreement with Russia and the United Kingdom, proposed as the northern limit of the Drake Passage the line connecting Waterman Island, Cape Horn, Cape San Bartolomé on Isla de los Estados, and the southern coast of that island to Cape San Juan de Salvamento, clearly overlapping areas under the delimitation of the Sea of the Southern Zone.

== The Argentine decree 256/2010 ==
On 17 February 2010 the Argentine executive issued the decree 256/2010 pertaining to authorisation requirements placed on shipping to and from Argentina but also to ships going through Argentine jurisdictional water heading for ports situated in the Falkland Islands, South Georgia and South Sandwich Islands. This decree was implemented by disposition 14/2010 of the Argentine Naval Prefecture. On 19 May 2010 the United Kingdom presented a note verbale rejecting the Argentine government's decree and disposition, saying that they "are not complaint [sic] with International Law including the UN Convention on the Law of the Sea", and with respect to the Straits of Magellan the note recalls that "the rights of international shipping to navigate these waters expeditiously and without obstacle are affirmed in the 1984 Treaty of Peace and Friendship between Chile and Argentina with respect to the Straits of Magellan".

Article 10 of the 1984 Treaty states "The Argentine Republic undertakes to maintain, at any time and in whatever circumstances, the right of ships of all flags to navigate expeditiously and without obstacles through its jurisdictional waters to and from the Strait of Magellan".

== See also ==
- Boundary treaty of 1881 between Chile and Argentina
- Argentina-Chile relations
- Foreign relations of Argentina
- Foreign relations of Chile
- Southern Zone Sea
- Dispute over the extended continental shelf in the Southern Sea between Argentina and Chile

== Literature ==
- Beagle Channel Arbitration between the Republic of Argentina and the Republic of Chile, Report and Decision of the Court of Arbitration
- Mark Laudy: The Vatican Mediation of the Beagle Channel Dispute: Crisis Intervention and Forum Building in Words Over War of Carnegie Commission on Preventing Deadly Conflict.
- Alejandro Luis Corbacho: Predicting the Probability of War During Brinkmanship Crises: The Beagle and the Malvinas Conflicts, Universidad del CEMA, Argentina, Documento de Trabajo No. 244, September 2003, Spanish
- Karin Oellers-Frahm: Der Schiedsspruch in der Beagle-Kanal-Streitigkeit, Berichte und Urkunden: Max-Planck-Institut für ausländisches öffentliches Recht und Völkerrecht, German
- Ministerio de Relaciones Exteriores de Chile: Relaciones Chileno-Argentinas, La controversia del Beagle. Genf 1979, English and Spanish
- Andrea Wagner: Der argentinisch-chilenische Konflikt um den Beagle-Kanal. Ein Beitrag zu den Methoden friedlicher Streiterledigung. Verlag Peter Lang, Frankfurt a.M. 1992, ISBN 3-631-43590-8, German
- Karl Hernekamp: Der argentinisch-chilenisch Grenzstreit am Beagle-Kanal. Institut für Iberoamerika-Kunde, Hamburg 1980, German
- Andrés Cisneros y Carlos Escudé, "Historia general de las Relaciones Exteriores de la República Argentina", Las relaciones con Chile, Cema, Argentina, Buenos Aires. Spanish
- Annegret I. Haffa: Beagle-Konflikt und Falkland (Malwinen)-Krieg. Zur Außenpolitik der Argentinischen Militarregierung 1976–1983. Weltforum Verlag, München/Köln/London 1987, ISBN 3-8039-0348-3, German
- Isaac F. Rojas und Arturo Medrano: Argentina en el Atlántico Chile en el Pacífico. Editorial Nemont, Buenos Aires, Argentina, 1979, Spanish
- Isaac F. Rojas, La Argentina en el Beagle y Atlántico sur 1. Parte. Editorial Diagraf, Buenos Aires, Argentina, Spanish
- Carlos Escudé und Andrés Cisneros: Historia general de las relaciones exteriores de la República Argentina (here), Spanish
- Fabio Vio Valdivieso: La mediación de su S.S. el Papa Juan Pablo II, Editorial Aconcagua, Santiago de Chile, 1984, Spanish
- Alberto Marín Madrid: El arbitraje del Beagle y la actitud Argentina. 1984, Editorial Moisés Garrido Urrea, id = A-1374-84 XIII, Spanish
- Luis Alberto Romero, Argentina in the twentieth Century. Pennsylvania State University Press, translated by James P. Brennan, 1994, ISBN 0-271-02191-8
- Divisionsgeneral (a.D.) Juan E. Gugliamelli: Cuestión del Beagle. Negociación directa o diálogo de armas (Trans.:The Beagle-Question, direct Negotiations or Dialog of the Weapons), in Spanish Language. Book compiled from articles of Argentine Magazin "Estrategia", Buenos Aires Nr:49/50, enero-febrero 1978, erschienen sind.
- General Martín Antonio Balza und Mariano Grondona: Dejo Constancia: memorias de un general argentino. Editorial Planeta, Buenos Aires 2001, ISBN 950-49-0813-6, Spanish
- Francisco Bulnes Serrano und Patricia Arancibia Clavel: La Escuadra En Acción. Chile, Editorial Grijalbo, 2004, ISBN 956-258-211-6, Spanish
