= Maipu Treaty =

The Maipu Treaty was signed on 30 October 2009 by the presidents of Chile, Michelle Bachelet, and Argentina, Cristina Fernández de Kirchner, in Maipú, Chile. The main purposes of it are to restore a railway connection between both countries, across the Andes mountain range, and a tunnel that goes through it at ground level. The project intends as well to allow 6 more crossings at other points of the Andes, and to facilitate the work of the Customs operations.

== See also ==
- Treaty of Peace and Friendship of 1984 between Chile and Argentina
