= Continental shelf of the United States =

Overview of the U.S. continental shelves

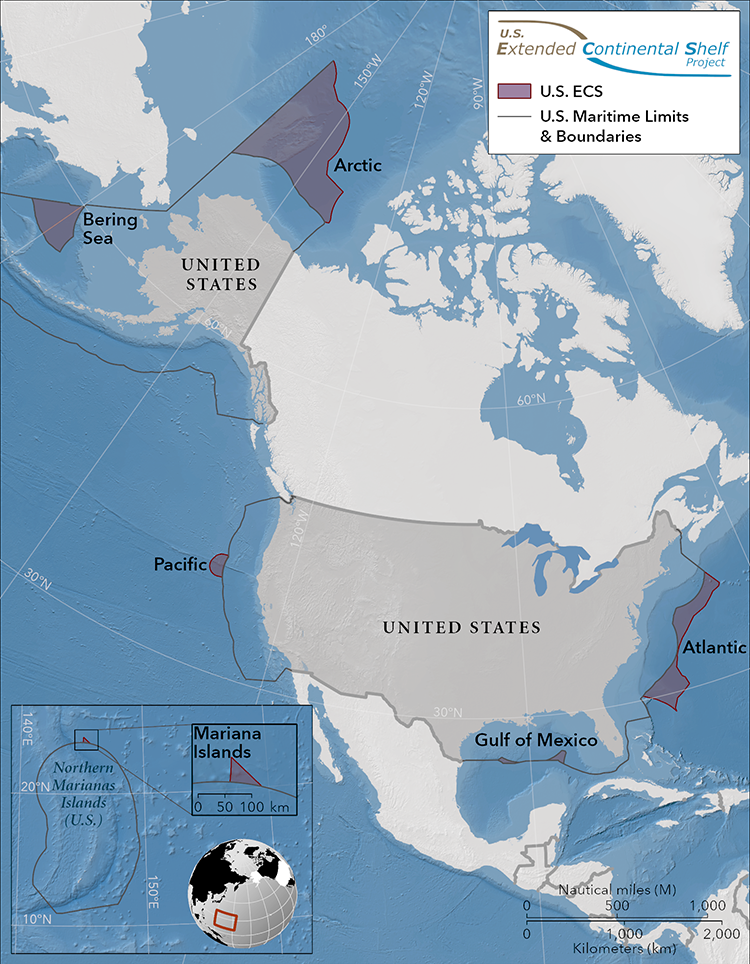
Diagram of the Extended Continental Shelf claim and the existing claims of continental shelves of the United States

The continental shelf of the United States is the total of the continental shelves adjacent to the United States. In marine geology, it is the elevated seabed near US coasts; in the political sense, it is the area claimed by the United States as sovereign.

== Geopolitics ==
The continental shelf of the United States serves as the limit of United States sovereign power, when not demarcated by an actual land border. Due to the fact that "The coastal State exercises over the continental shelf sovereign rights," the continental shelf serves as the territorial sea and the exclusive economic zone of the United States, and as such, is claimed by the United States. The United States also claims an extended continental shelf which follows a distinct category.

The seabed claimed by the United States is claimed as continental shelf due to a combination of qualifications offered by article 76 in the UN convention. These qualifications most notably include paragraph 4(b), paragraph 5, and paragraph 7, all in article 76, according to a report published in 2023. All new claims made by the United States follow these qualifications, along with all previously existing claims by the United States. The United States claims that they have mapped these regions since 2003 to determine the worthiness of these claims. The data collected from these surveys is publicly available on the US State Department website.

On December 19, 2023, the United States Department of State announced the results of its “U.S. Extended Continental Shelf Project”. It declared an expansion in the outer boundaries of the United States continental shelf in numerous regions. The U.S. Extended Continental Shelf partially overlaps with ECS areas of Canada, The Bahamas, and Japan. In these areas, the United States and these countries will need to establish maritime boundaries in the future.

=== Disputes and overlaps ===
While some of the borders claimed by the United States are pursuant to existing treaties, most notably with Mexico and Russia, many new claims overlap with existing claims of other countries.

In the Arctic, Atlantic, and Mariana Islands regions, new American claims overlap with claims made by the Bahamas, Canada, and Japan. In the Arctic and Atlantic regions, both the Bahamas and Canada signaled willingness to negotiate boundary claims following the release of the 2023 report. However, the US-Japanese maritime border near the Mariana Islands has been disputed since a 1993 report, and Japan has not signaled willingness to negotiate or accept US proposals over the shared border, according to the 2023 report.

== Marine geology ==
The continental shelf of the United States is one of the largest examples of marine geology in the world, with thousands of miles of submarine land making up the various shelves of the collective. Each different shelf features different extents of continental shelves, from the long, elevated shelves of Alaska, to the short shelf of the Pacific Coast. Bathymetric data collected by the United States reveals the peculiarities of the different shelves.

=== Alaska ===
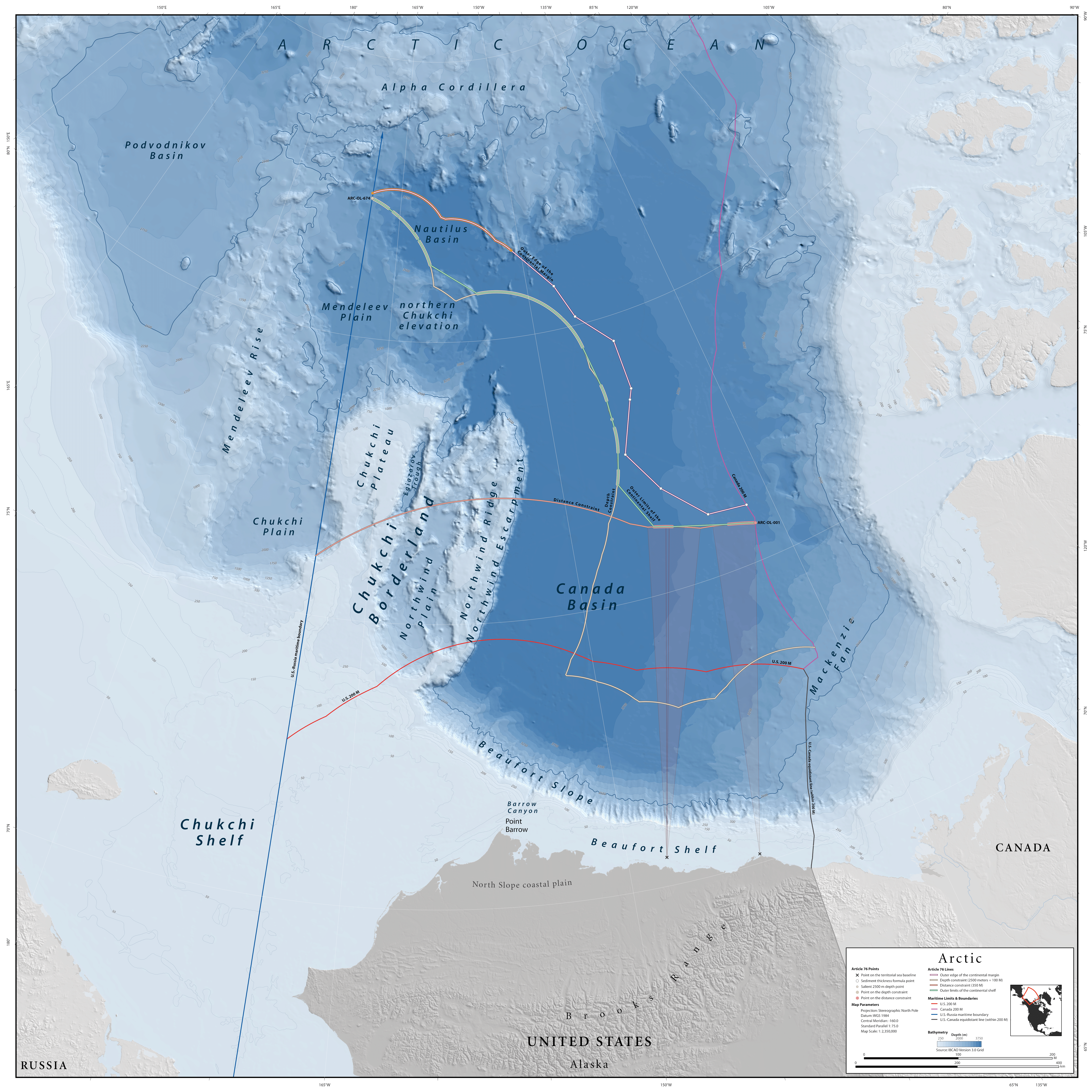
Detailed relief map of the United States continental shelf in north Alaska, including US extended continental shelf claims

Alaska features some of the most prominent continental shelves in the world, extending over 400 nautical miles from the tip of Alaska, near Utqiagvik. At a depth of less than 200 meters, the Chukchi Shelf is the preeminent shelf in the arctic, barely engulfed by the Arctic Ocean. This shelf has been intensively studied for its mineral resources, most notably crude oil. As of January 2004, more than 10 billion barrels of oil had been produced from the shelf, all from the Prudhoe Bay Oil Field, according to a British Petroleum report from 2006. The rest of the northern shelf is made up of the Chukchi Plateau, or the Chukchi Borderlands, as referred to in the 2023 Extended Continental Shelf document. These borderlands, while more broken up and slightly deeper, are claimed to be in accordance to all six qualification measured by the United States in the survey. This area is strategically important due to is purported rich natural resources, especially oil and manganese, although no resources have been proven.

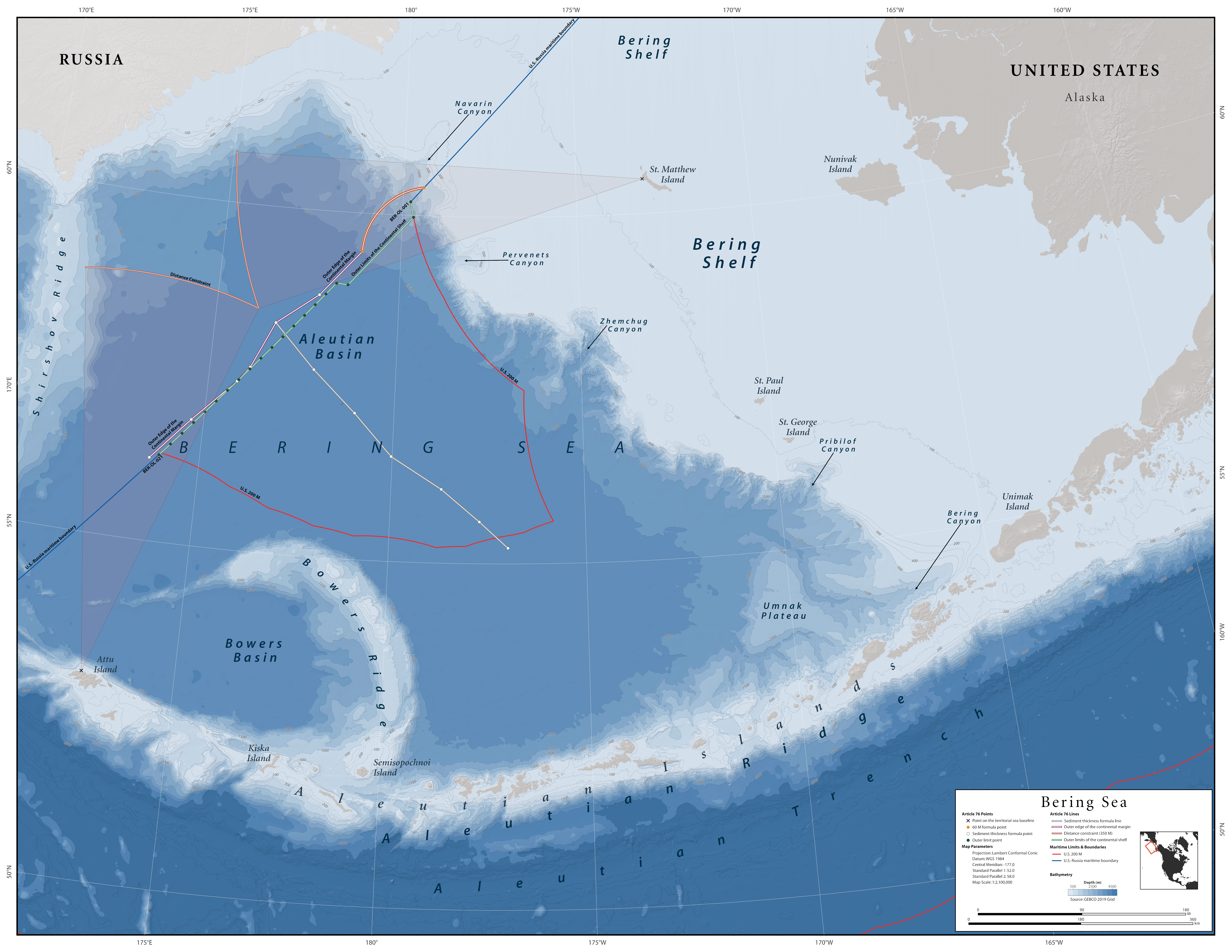
Detailed relief map of the United States continental shelf in south Alaska, including US extended continental shelf claims

In the Bering Sea, the large Bering Shelf dominates the area, stretching over 300 nautical miles from southwest mainland Alaska, at a depth of around 500 metres. The shelf features the large and sparsely populated Nunivak Island, the eight largest island in the United States. The Alaskan Peninsula and Aleutian Islands extend from the south edge of the Bering Shelf, and the submarine Aleutian Ridge extends all the way to Attu Island, over 1000 miles from mainland Alaska. Bowers Ridge, located along the Aleutian Ridge and jutting northwest 200 nautical miles from Semisopochnoi Island, forms the last major feature of the Bering Sea continental shelf. Both the Aleutian Ridge and Bowers Ridge were formed by volcanic activity drifting due to the movement of the Pacific tectonic plate.

== See also ==
- Outer Continental Shelf
- Continental shelf of Russia
- Continental shelf of Chile
- Dispute over the extended continental shelf in the Southern Zone Sea between Argentina and Chile
