= Chilean Sea =

Portion of the Pacific Ocean lying west of the Chilean mainland

Coordinates: 23°00′S 70°45′W

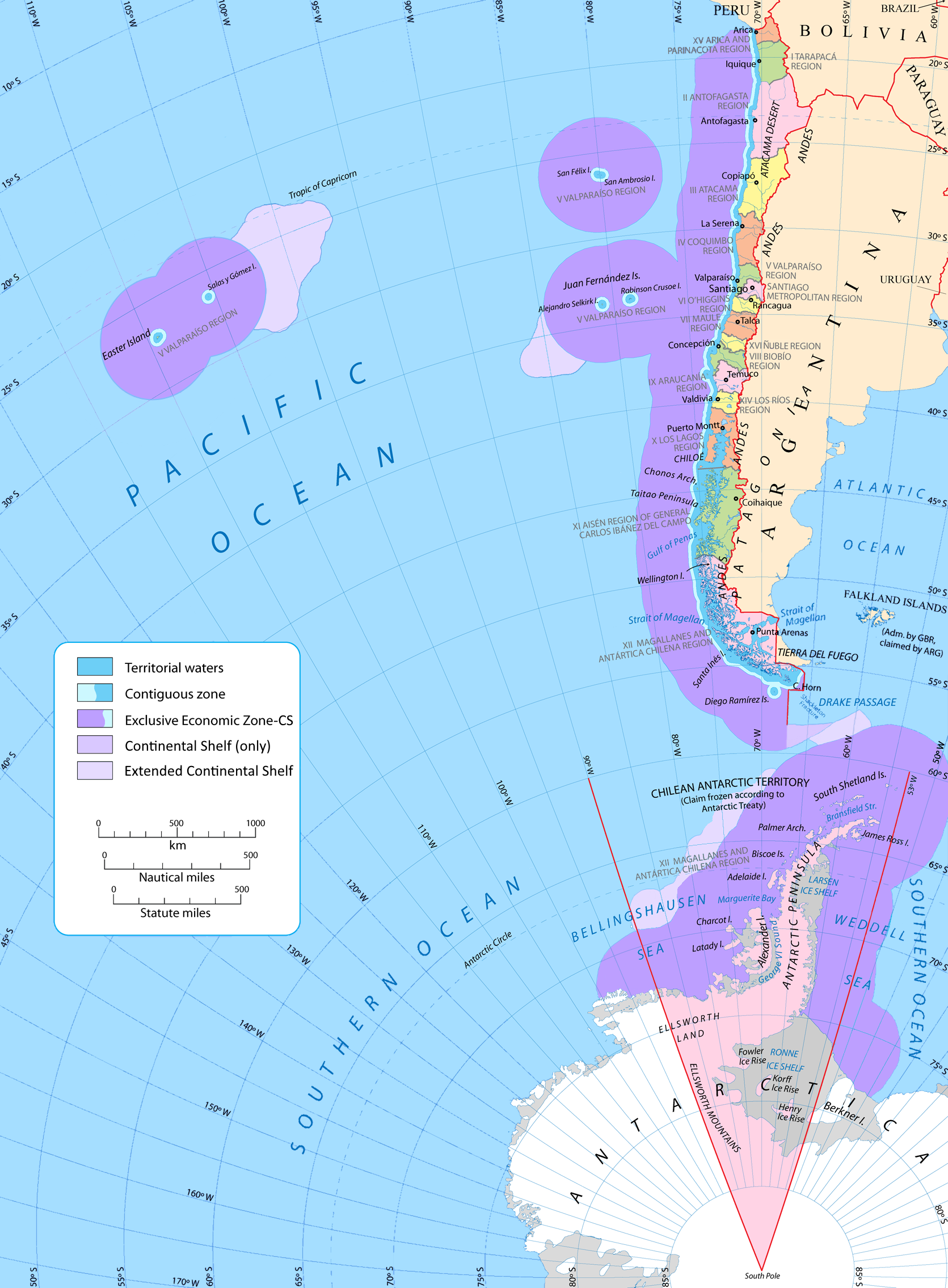
Map showing the Chilean sea, the Chilean continental shelf, including the Antarctic claim Exclusive economic zone-continental shelf Continental shelf Extended continental shelf

The Chilean Maritime Domain (Spanish: Espacio marítimo chileno), also known as the Chilean Sea (Spanish: Mar Chileno), comprises the set of maritime spaces over which Chile exercises sovereignty, exclusive rights, and claims of varying degrees in the Pacific, Atlantic, and Southern Oceans. This definition often includes the adjacent high seas area known as the “presential sea,” over which Chile neither exercises nor claims any degree of sovereignty. Additionally, Chile claims sovereignty over its continental shelf and extended continental shelf.

It is not strictly a sea in the geographic sense defined by the International Hydrographic Organization, but rather a sea in a legal and political sense. It refers to the waters surrounding the continental coast up to 200 nautical miles to the west from the low tide line, and in the case of the Polynesian islands of Rapa Nui (Easter Island) and Salas y Gómez, 350 nautical miles. Through Decree 346 of 1974 by the Ministry of Foreign Affairs, this area was designated as the "Chilean Sea" (Mar Chileno).

Law 18,565 of 1986 amended various legal norms to align Chile’s legal framework with the United Nations Convention on the Law of the Sea (UNCLOS), and through Law 19,080 of 1991, the "Chilean presential sea" (mar presencial) was defined unilaterally.

Regarding the northern limit, Peru raised a dispute, which was resolved on January 27, 2014, by a ruling from the International Court of Justice that partially established a new maritime border. The exact coordinates of this new boundary were determined on March 25 of the same year through the signing of an agreement between the two states at the Peruvian Ministry of Foreign Affairs. Additionally, as a result of the establishment of the new maritime boundary, this ruling led to a reduction of Chile’s maritime zone by granting Peru a portion of it.

In 2021, Chilean President Sebastián Piñera signed Supreme Decree No. 95, which explicitly defined the continental shelf east of meridian 67° 16' 0" as part of Chile’s (non-extended) continental shelf area, projected from the Diego Ramírez Islands. This also laid claim to the crescent-shaped area that Argentina considers part of the extension it obtained under the criteria for an extended continental shelf. This was reflected in SHOA Chart No. 8 and prompted a response from Argentina’s Ministry of Foreign Affairs opposing Chile’s measure within the framework of the dispute over the extended continental shelf in the Southern Zone Sea between Argentina and Chile.

On December 21, 2020, Chile submitted to the United Nations Commission on the Limits of the Continental Shelf a partial report regarding the extended continental shelf around Easter Island and Salas y Gómez Island.

In February 2022, Chile submitted its second partial presentation concerning the Western Continental Shelf of the Chilean Antarctic Territory. In August of the same year, it delivered the oral presentations for both partial submissions during the 55th Session of the Commission on the Limits of the Continental Shelf at the United Nations in New York.

In 2023, Chile, through SHOA, made available an illustrative graphic showing all maritime areas claimed by the country; this was once again rejected by Argentina.

The Chilean Sea contains significant amounts of phosphorite and manganese-iron nodules, which may be potential targets for future seafloor mining.

== Continental shelf and extended continental shelf ==
The continental shelf of Chile is the underwater extension adjacent to the Chilean coasts that stretches from the shoreline to the edge of the continental shelf in the Pacific Ocean and the Southern Ocean.

The scientific study and delimitation of the continental shelf and its outer limit are conducted by the National Committee for the Continental Shelf, established in 2007.

The delimitation of Chile's continental shelf follows principles established by the United Nations Convention on the Law of the Sea (UNCLOS), which sets guidelines for the delineation of continental shelves by coastal states. Chile has submitted claims to the United Nations Commission on the Limits of the Continental Shelf.

Apart from its economic importance, the continental shelf also holds geopolitical significance. Its delimitation has occasionally led to tensions with neighboring countries, particularly Argentina, which also claims rights over adjacent maritime areas. Decisions and presentations made to the UN have influenced bilateral relations and Chile's maritime policies, making the continental shelf a critical issue in the country's security and defense agenda.

== Presential sea ==
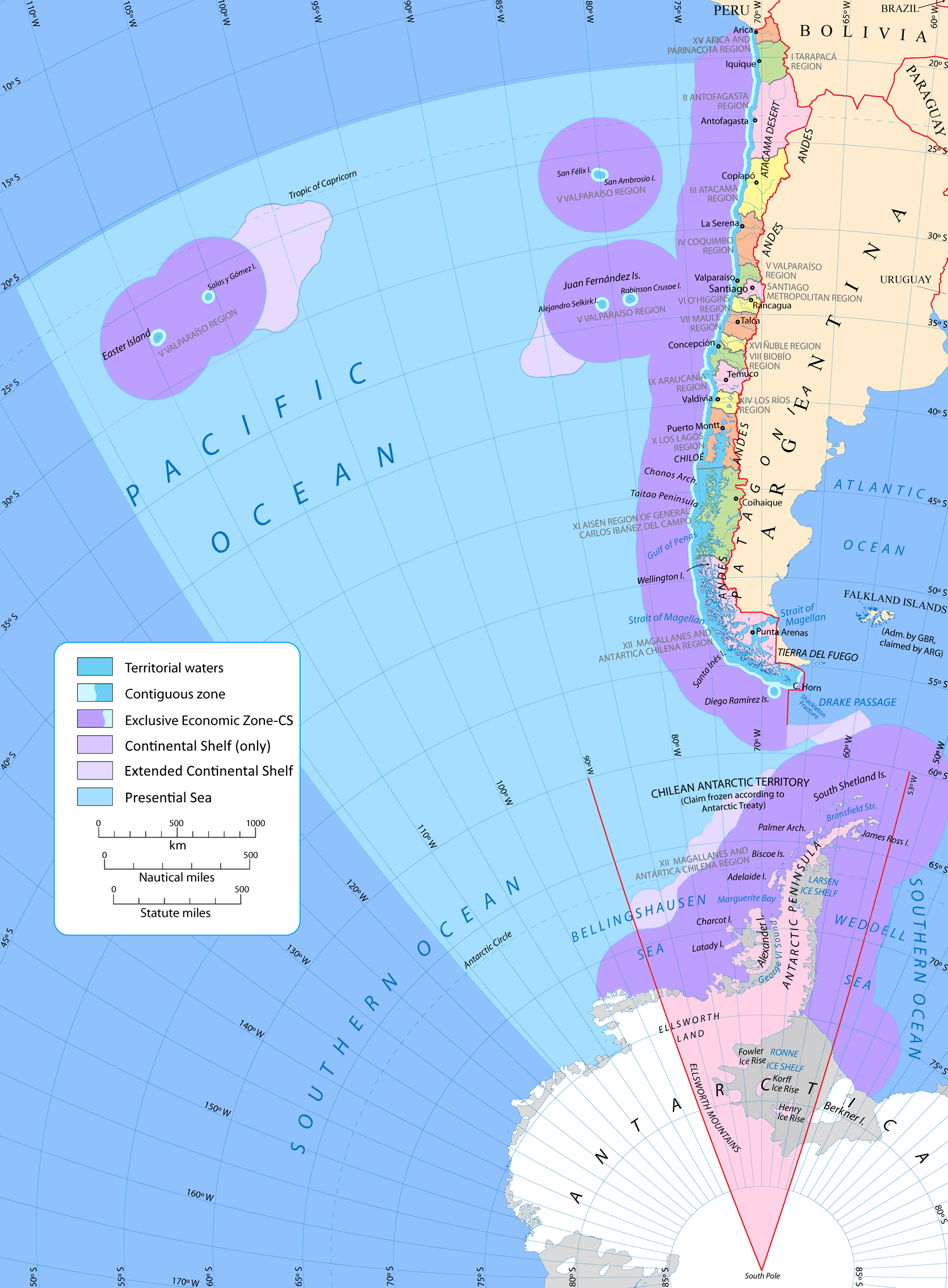
Map showing the Chilean sea, including Antarctic claim Exclusive economic zone-continental shelf Continental shelf Extended continental shelf Presential sea

The face sea, or heritage safeguard sea, is the maritime space that a certain coastal country demarcates, after an oceanopolitical appreciation, in order to indicate to third parties its zone of influence in the high seas adjacent to its exclusive economic zone, where its interests were or could be directly involved.

Without claims of sovereignty, by making a delimitation that includes the effective occupation of the high seas contiguous to its respective oceanic territory, the coastal state shows the interest in preserving said area from abusive uses or from certain activities that, due to its proximity, may affect the marine resources that inhabit its waters, especially, guarding the highly migratory straddling fishery resources from predation, and pollution of the marine habitat.

== EEZ of Chile ==
Chile's exclusive economic zones, including Antarctic claim

Chile's EEZ includes areas around the Desventuradas Islands, Easter Island and the Juan Fernández Islands.

Region	EEZ Area (km^{2})	Land area	Total
Mainland	1,975,760	755 757	2,731,517
Desventuradas	449 836	5	449 841
Easter	720 412	164	720 576
Juan Fernandez	502 524	100	502 624
Total	3,648,532	755 921	4,404,453

== Gallery ==
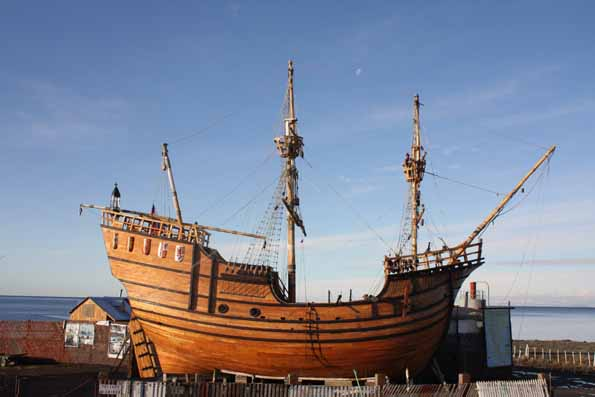
The Ferdinand Magellan's Nao Replica in the Museo Nao Victoria in Punta Arenas Chile, the first ship to sail it

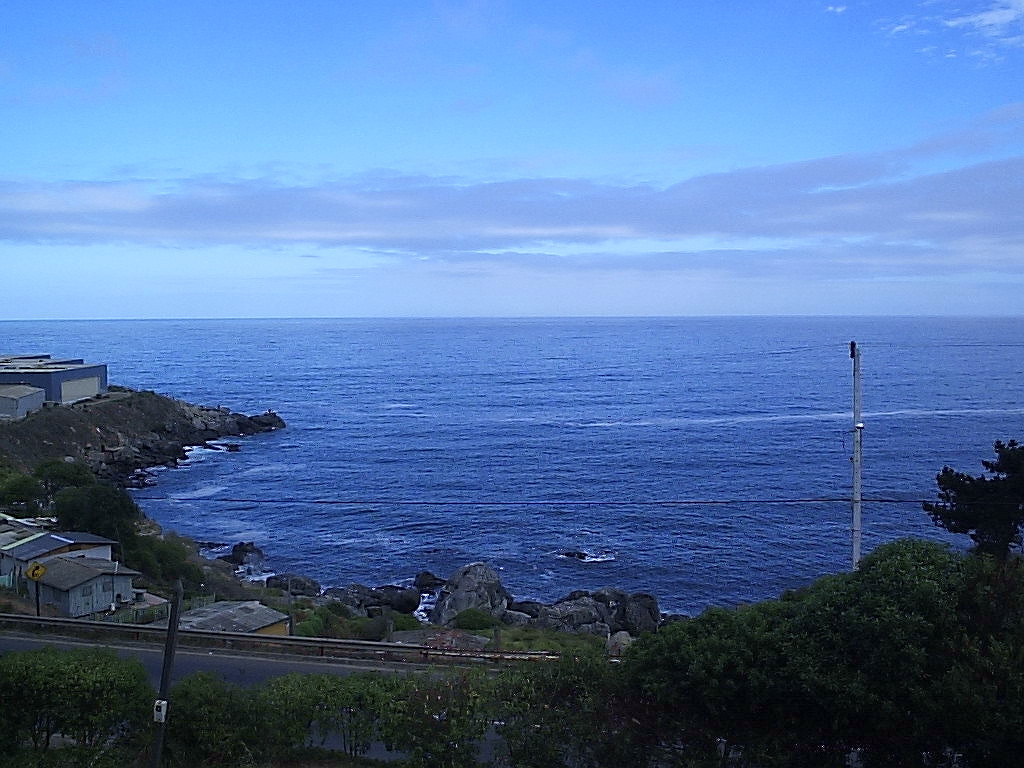
The Chilean Sea

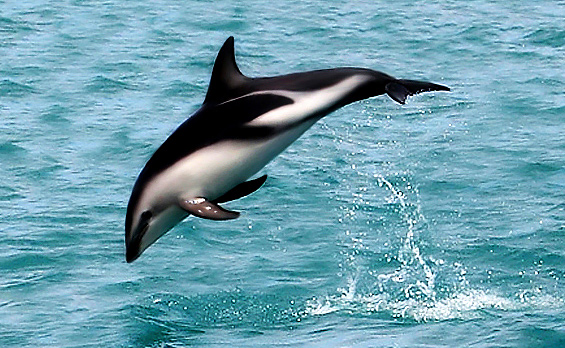
A dusky dolphin

== See also ==
- Borde costero
- Maritime history of Chile
- Continental shelf of Chile
- Insular Chile
- Islands of Chile
- Tricontinental Chile
- Chilean Antarctic Territory
- Geography of Chile
- Chilean–Peruvian maritime dispute
- Pacific Islands Forum
- Easter Island
- Exclusive economic zone of Chile
- Presential Sea
- Mar de Grau
- Movimiento Archipiélago Soberano
- Norwegian Sea
- Libyan Sea
- List of active separatist movements in South America
- Chiloé Province
- Patagonia
- Arica y Parinacota Region
- Easter Island
