= Tricontinental Chile =

Geopolitical concept denoting Chile's unique position

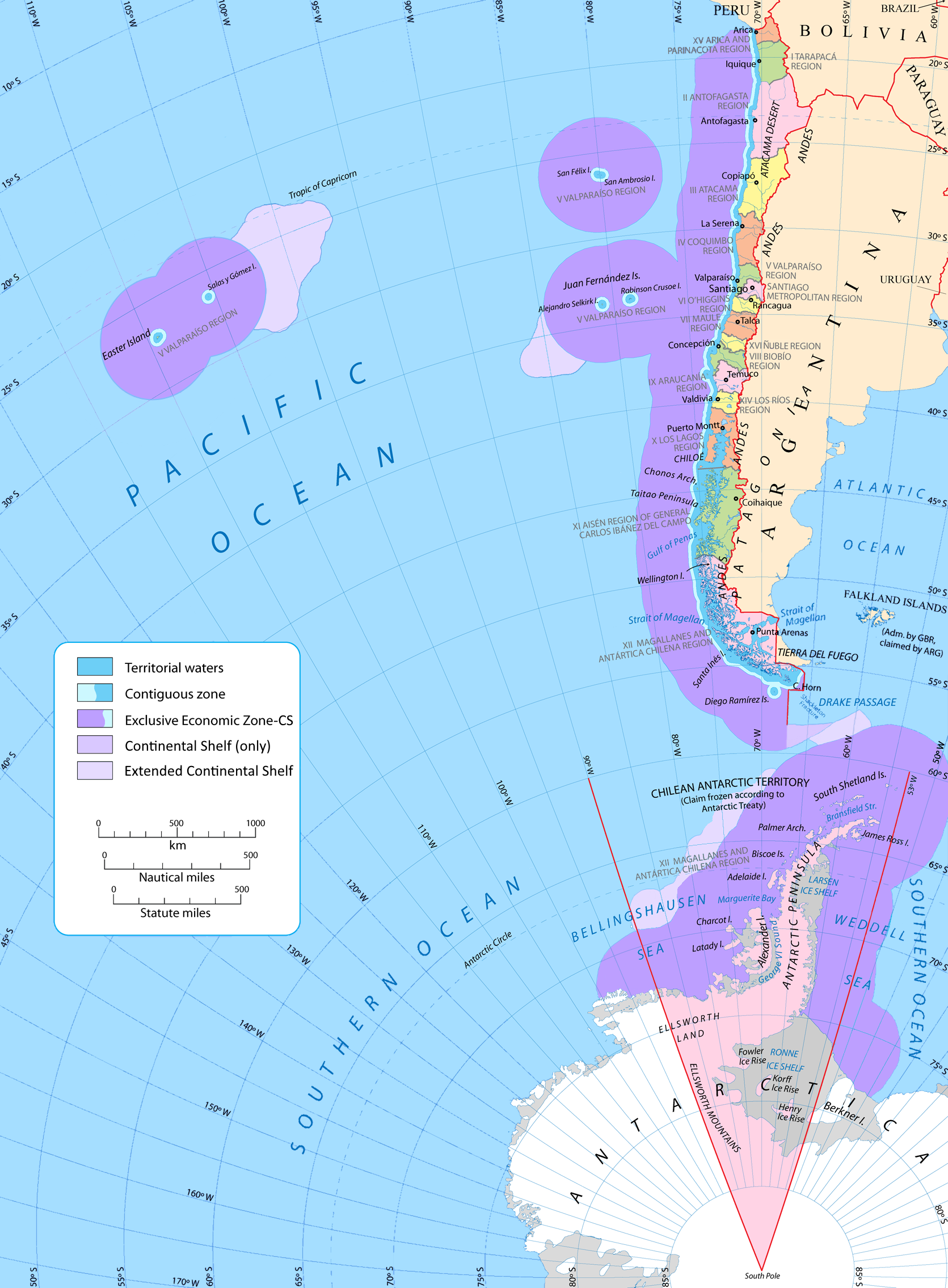
Map of Tricontinental Chile with possessions in South America (mainland), Oceania (Easter Island), Antarctica (Chilean Antarctic Territory) and the country's continental shelf

Tricontinental Chile (Spanish: Chile tricontinental) is a geopolitical concept denoting Chile's unique position with its mainland in South America, Easter Island in Oceania (Polynesia) and the Chilean Antarctic Territory in Antarctica. This concept is built on the basis that there are Chilean territories as far away from the mainland as to be considered part of Polynesia and on a larger scale, Oceania, and Chile's claims to Antarctica provide it a basis for claiming to be a part of Antarctica as well.

== Chile in the Pacific ==
The definition of Chile as a tricontinental country necessarily emphasizes the importance of the Pacific Ocean in its foreign policy. Consequently, the Chilean government has developed the concept of the "in-person sea," which focuses on promoting and enhancing its influence in the exclusive economic zone of the Pacific Ocean, where its territories and claims are concentrated. Law No. 19080, published in September 1991, defines the Chilean sea as "that part of the high seas, existing for the international community, between the limit of our continental exclusive economic zone and the meridian that passes through the western border of the continental shelf of Easter Island. This extends from the parallel of milestone No. 1 of the international border line that separates Chile and Peru to the South Pole." The foreign policy of the Chilean state encompasses both the signing of international agreements and unilateral actions aimed at asserting a guarantor role in activities conducted in this area, such as fishing, scientific research, and maritime traffic. Furthermore, Chile claims continental shelves in its territories on all three continents and beyond.

== Continental Chile ==
Continental Chile corresponds to the strip of territory along the southwestern coast of South America and its adjacent islands. Almost the entire population lives in continental Chile, which extends from 17°30’ S, at the border with Peru and Bolivia, to the Diego Ramírez Islands at 56°30’ S. The maximum width of 445 km (277 mi) is at 52°21’ S, at the Strait of Magellan, whilst the minimum width is at 31°37’ S between Punta Amolanas and Paso de la Casa de Piedra.

== Insular Chile ==
Insular Chile consists of a group of islands of volcanic origin in the South Pacific, far from the continental coast. In the eastern group are the Juan Fernández Islands and the Desventuradas Islands, which are grouped with South America, while Easter Island and the Isla Salas y Gómez geographically belong to Polynesia in Oceania. Easter Island (or Rapa Nui), is the westernmost part of Chile, situated at 27°S and 109°W.

== Chilean Antarctica ==
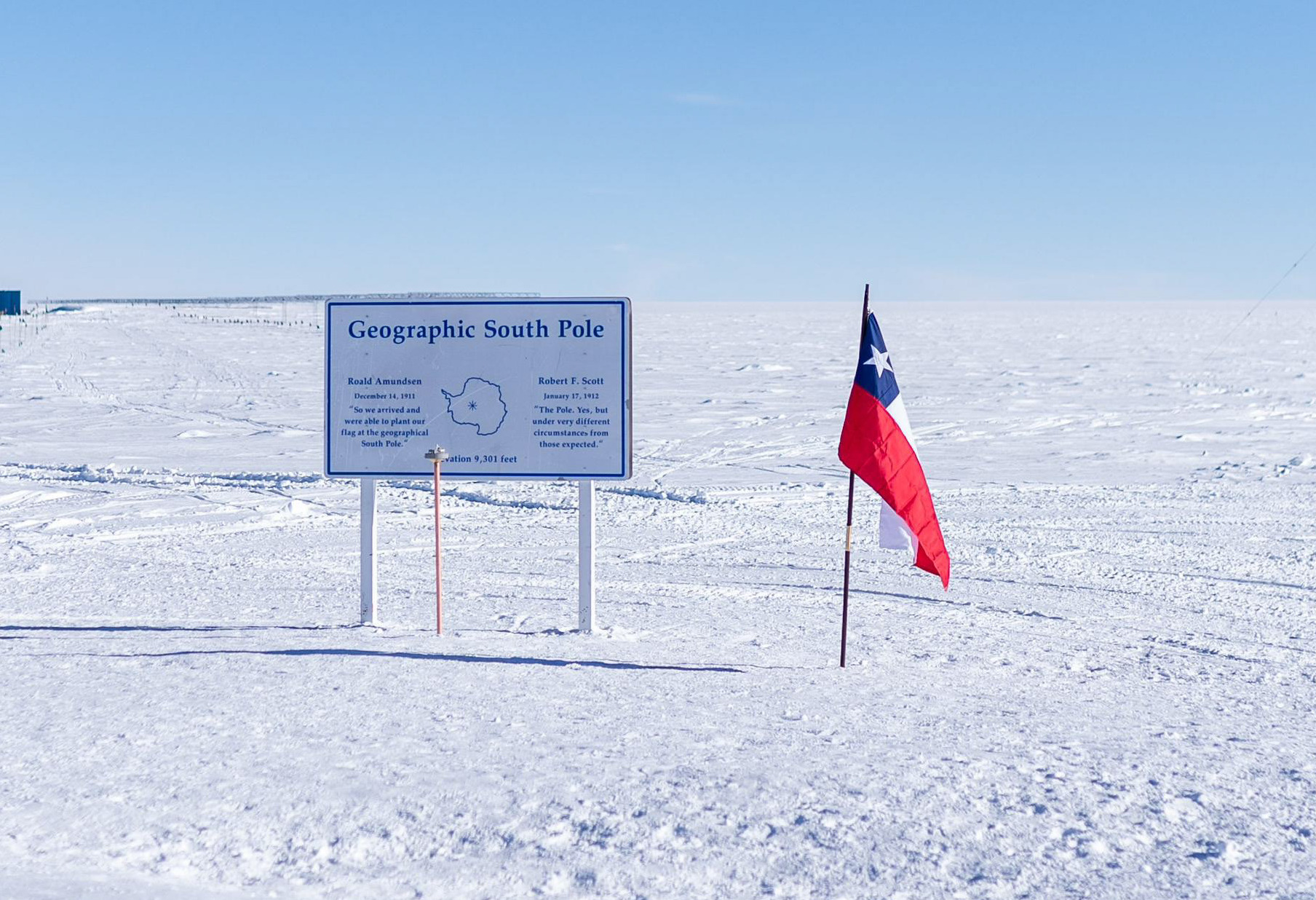
Southern Frontier of Tricontinental Chile, the South Pole with a national flag.

The Chilean Antarctic Territory is a claim of 1,250,000 km^{2} (480,000 sq mi) of Antarctica between 53°W and 90°W and from 60°S to the South Pole, overlapping with the claims of Argentina and the United Kingdom. As a signatory to the Antarctic Treaty System, Chile has accepted the suspension of its claims of sovereignty without renouncing them, as well as the establishment of a conservation zone for scientific development.

If the Antarctic claim was included, the total area of Chile would be 2,006,096 km^{2} (774,558 sq mi), while the distance between the northern and southern extremes would be more than 8,000 km (5,000 mi).

Between these three distinct zones is the so-called Chilean Sea; portions of the continental shelf lie within the exclusive economic zone of 370 km (230 mi).

== See also ==
- Maritime history of Chile
- Geography of Chile
- Pacific Islands Forum
- Easter Island
- Patagonia
- Araucanía (historic region)
- Continental shelf of Chile
- Exclusive economic zone of Chile
