= Argentine Sea =

Sea within the continental shelf off the Argentine mainland

- The Argentine Sea, off the Atlantic coast of Argentina
- Location: Eastern shore of Argentina
- Coordinates: 46°S 63°W
- Part of: South Atlantic Ocean
- River sources: Río de la Plata, Colorado River, Río Negro, Chubut River, Deseado River
- Basin countries: Argentina, Uruguay, Falkland Islands (UK)
- Surface area: 1,000,000 square kilometres (390,000 mi^{2})
- Islands: Falkland Islands, Tierra del Fuego

The Argentine Sea (Spanish: Mar Argentino) is a marginal sea of the Atlantic Ocean adjacent to the southern tip of South America. It ranges from the mouth of the estuary of the Río de la Plata in the north (35th parallel south) to the Isla de los Estados in the south, and from the Argentine coast to the 200 meters isobath. Its width varies between 210 km in front of Mar del Plata and 850 km at the latitude of the Falkland Islands. The coastline extends for 4,725 km. To the east of the Argentine Sea extends the much deeper and more extensive Argentine Basin.

== History ==
The name Argentine Sea appears to have been coined by Romanian-born explorer Julius Popper, who surveyed and charted parts of Tierra del Fuego in the mid-1880s. The name appears in charts of the region he published in 1891.

== Geography ==
The Argentine Sea is in the South Atlantic Ocean off the southeastern coast of Argentina, extending from the approximate latitude of Montevideo, Uruguay, southward to Tierra del Fuego, and is situated about 500 mi (800 km) north of Antarctica. It is underlain by the continental sea shelf of the Patagonian Shelf. The Argentine Sea has a surface area of 1,000,000 km^{2} (390,000 sq mi) and is one of the largest seas in the world. The average depth of the sea is 1,205 m (3,952 ft) and the maximum depth is 2,224 m (7,296 ft). It has a salinity of 3.5%.

The Argentine Sea progressively widens going southward, in contrast to the narrowing of the continental mass. The sea platform has a series of plateaux which descend to the east as large terraces or steps. Because of its stair-shaped plateaux, the Argentine Sea is similar morphologically to the Extra-Andean Patagonia. The Falkland Islands are also located within the continental shelf of the Argentine Sea.

=== Territorial claims ===
According to Argentine law No. 23968 of 1991, Argentina claims territorial waters extending 12 nautical miles (22 km; 14 mi) from the line from the gulfs of San Matías and San Jorge to the outer limits of the River Plate. The contiguous zone extends 12 nautical miles after the territorial waters, and the exclusive economic zone 200 nautical miles (370 km; 230 mi) from it. Argentina also claims an extended continental shelf extending to either the limits of the exclusive economic zone or the shelf slope. Argentina has signed and ratified the United Nations Convention on the Law of the Sea.

The exclusive economic zone claimed by Argentina overlap with claims maintained by the United Kingdom around the Falkland Islands and similar claims around South Georgia and the South Sandwich Islands. The UK's Falkland Islands claim boundary starts from the midpoint between Argentina and the islands to the West and stretches 200 nautical miles in other directions with similar claims around the other British Overseas Territories.

Argentina announced its claim without consultation with the United Kingdom. In the years 1990 to 2005 fishing and mineral resources in the area were administered by joint commissions between Argentina and the United Kingdom, Argentina unilaterally withdrew from these organisations in 2005 to pursue a more aggressive stance in its claim to the Falkland Islands. At any one time Argentina usually has a single vessel patrolling the undisputed area of its claim, the vessels do not enter the exclusive economic zone of the United Kingdom although there have been reports of Argentine warships threatening vessels on the Falkland side of the border by radio.

== Dispute over the extended continental shelf with Chile ==
Map of the dispute.

The United Nations Convention on the Law of the Sea (UNCLOS) of April 30, 1982, which entered into force on November 16, 1994, established the regime of the continental shelf in Part VI (Articles 76 to 85), defining in Article 76, paragraph 1 what is understood as a continental shelf.

Argentina ratified the convention on January 12, 1995, and it came into force for the country on December 31, 1995.

On August 25, 1997, Chile signed and ratified the United Nations Convention on the Law of the Sea, and it entered into force for the country on September 24, 1997.

In 2009, Argentina submitted a presentation to the United Nations Commission on the Limits of the Continental Shelf, which was accepted in 2016 by the UNCLOS. The map in the submission included the disputed territories with the United Kingdom, such as the Falkland Islands, South Georgia, and South Sandwich Islands, a crescent-shaped area south of Argentina's territorial sea as defined in the 1984 treaty with Chile. This area was also claimed by Chile as part of its presential sea, and the sea surrounding the Antarctic Peninsula, which is claimed by all three aforementioned countries. That same year, on May 8, Chile submitted its Preliminary Report to the United Nations Commission on the Limits of the Continental Shelf.

In 2020, the Argentine Chamber of Deputies unanimously approved the outer limit of the Argentine Continental Shelf in Law 27,557.

That same year, on December 21, Chile submitted to the United Nations Commission on the Limits of the Continental Shelf the partial report on the extended continental shelf in Easter Island and Salas y Gómez.

In 2021, Chilean President Sebastián Piñera signed Supreme Decree No. 95, which outlined the continental shelf east of the 67º 16' 0 meridian as part of Chile's continental shelf (not the extended one) area projected from the Diego Ramírez Islands, also claiming the crescent area that Argentina considers part of its extension achieved under the extended continental shelf principle. This was reflected in the SHOA Chart No. 8 and prompted a response from the Argentine Foreign Ministry against Chile's measure.

In February 2022, Chile submitted its second partial presentation regarding the Western Continental Shelf of the Chilean Antarctic Territory. In August of the same year, Chile made the oral presentations of both partial submissions during the 55th Session of the Commission on the Limits of the Continental Shelf at the United Nations in New York.

In 2023, Chile, through SHOA, made available an illustrative graphic showing all the maritime areas claimed by the country, which was once again rejected by Argentina.

In July 2023, the International Court of Justice ruled on the priority of a Continental Shelf over an Extended Continental Shelf in the case of the territorial and maritime dispute between Colombia and Nicaragua.

== Biodiversity ==
The Argentine sea is one of the most temperate seas of the world. It receives the cold Falkland Current from the south, which comes from the Antarctic, and the warm Brazil Current from the north.

The Argentine sea has twelve areas identified as places of great biodiversity. There are two international protected areas, one national, and eighteen provincial ones.

The Argentine sea has plankton, algae, crustaceans, sardines and anchovies. Those feed the more advanced fauna such as penguins, cormorants, sharks, whales, dolphins, Burmeister's porpoise, fur seals, sea lions, and southern elephant seals.

== See also ==
- Argentine Atlantic Coast
- Scotia Sea
- Strait of Magellan
