= Beagle conflict =

Border dispute between Chile and Argentina

- Map of the Beagle conflict between Argentina & Chile and its maritime projection.
Date	1904–1984
Location	Beagle Channel
Result	Treaty settlement

Belligerents
Argentina	Chile

The Beagle conflict was a border dispute between Chile and Argentina over the possession of Picton, Lennox and Nueva islands and the scope of the maritime jurisdiction associated with those islands that brought the countries to the brink of war in 1978.

The islands are strategically located off the south edge of Tierra del Fuego and at the east end of the Beagle Channel. The Beagle Channel, the Straits of Magellan and the Drake Passage are the only three waterways between the Pacific Ocean and the Atlantic Ocean in the Southern Hemisphere.

After refusing to abide by a binding international award giving the islands to Chile, the Argentine junta advanced the nation to war in 1978 in order to produce a boundary consistent with Argentine claims.

The Beagle conflict is seen as the main reason for Chilean support of the United Kingdom during the Falklands War of 1982.

The conflict began in 1904 with the first official Argentine claims over the islands that had been under Chilean control ever since southern Patagonia was colonised, through the Conquest of the Desert by Argentina and the so-called Pacification of Araucanía in Chile.

The conflict passed through several phases. Since 1881, they were as claimed Chilean islands. Beginning in 1904, they were disputed islands, followed later by direct negotiations, submission to a binding international tribunal, further direct negotiations, brinkmanship, and settlement.

The conflict was resolved through papal mediation and since 1984 Argentina has recognized the islands as Chilean territory. The 1984 treaty also resolves several collateral issues of great importance, including navigation rights, sovereignty over other islands in the Fuegian Archipelago, delimitation of the Straits of Magellan, and maritime boundaries south to Cape Horn and beyond.

== Background ==
Long after its first exploration by Europeans, the region of Patagonia and the Tierra del Fuego archipelago remained free from colonial settlements because of its inhospitable climate, harsh conditions and sparse local vegetation. After the disaster of Puerto del Hambre (1584) during the regency of Philip II of Spain no other attempts of settlements were made in the zone.

In 1843 the Chilean government sent an expedition with the appointed task of establishing a permanent settlement on the shores of the Strait of Magellan. The founding act of the settlement of Fuerte Bulnes took place on 21 September 1843. A few years later (1848) the settlement moved to Punta Arenas.

Argentine Ushuaia was founded by the English-born missionary Thomas Bridges in 1869.

In 1881, during the War of the Pacific (1878-1884, between Chile against Peru and Bolivia whereby Chile acquired the Atacama region from Peru and Bolivia), Chile and Argentina attempted to definitively resolve the East Patagonia, Tierra del Fuego and Strait of Magellan dispute through a comprehensive agreement known as the Boundary treaty of 1881 between Chile and Argentina. This agreement provided that the border between the two countries would follow:

- (Article I, from north to parallel 52°S) the highest peaks and Drainage divide,
- (Article II, from 52°S to the Straits of Magellan) mainly the parallel 52°S and
- (Article III, south of Straits of Magellan) mainly the meridian 68°34 W and the Beagle channel.

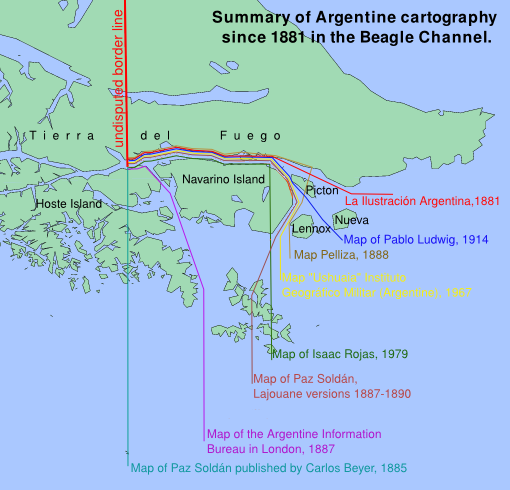
Different Argentine Interpretations of the Boundary treaty of 1881. The red line of "La Ilustración Argentina", chronological the first one and the Chilean one, is currently valid. See maps in Beagle Channel cartography since 1881

Until 1887 there was no doubt in Argentina and Chile that the islands Picton, Nueva and Lennox belonged to Chile:

There can be no doubt that in the immediate post-Treaty period, that is to say from 1881 to at least 1887/88, Argentine cartography in general showed the PNL [Picton, Nueva and Lennox] group as Chilean;

In 1891, Romanian-born explorer Julius Popper claimed at a conference in the Argentine Geographic Institute that the deepest part of the Beagle Channel turned south along the coast of Navarino Island, leaving Picton, Nueva and Lennox on the Argentine side of the border. His ideas were very well received by Argentine authorities, who then pushed to have said border recognized.

In 1904, the Argentine government solicited Chile to define jointly which was the deepest arm of the Beagle channel in the zone in order to find the demarcation of the border. On the basis of the international cartography of the zone, the descriptions of the discoverer of the channel, and the discourse of the signatories of the 1881 Treaty, Chile initially did not attach importance to the note.

The chief of the Argentine exploring commission of the southern territories, Francisco P. Moreno in a memorandum to the British Ambassador in Buenos Aires, 1918, saw the Argentine claim as baseless:

I can't understand why the Argentine Government claims sovereignty over the islands Picton, Nueva, Lennox, etc., basing its arguments on the 1881 Treaty and the 1893 Protocol, when the first one invalidates its claim and the second one has nothing to do with the demarcation of the Beagle channel. I insist: the phrasing in the 1881 Treaty, ["]except the Isla de los Estados["], will put paid to any such badly planned lawsuit ... I repeat that the exception the 1881 Treaty makes for the Isla de los Estados, that stated as Argentine, does not permit any doubt over the Chilean property of territories located south of the Tierra del Fuego and south of the Beagle channel.

The unresolved conflict continued to simmer. During the Snipe incident, Argentine forces destroyed a Chilean lighthouse on the Snipe islet at the entry of the Beagle Channel installed on 1 May 1958, put up their own and landed marines on the islet, provoking a dangerous buildup. Later both countries agreed to pull back military forces and dismantle the lighthouses.

In Chilean military circles, the maximum neighbor hypothesis is theorized, which is that in the event of a conflict with a neighbor, the other two would join in.

== Interests of the parties ==
Over the years, the growing importance of the Antarctic and issues of navigation routes between the Pacific Ocean and the Atlantic Ocean, the possibility of oil fields in the zone, and fishing rights led both countries to harden their positions, and the conflict was extended to other issues regarding the zone.

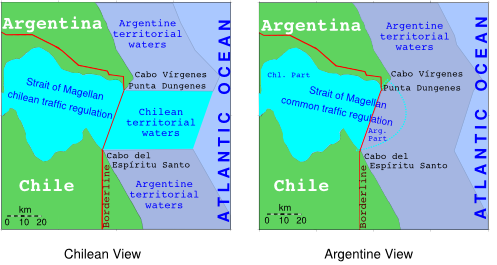
Two visions of the maritime boundaries at the eastern entrance to the Strait of Magellan

There was a controversy about the east end of the Straits of Magellan. Both countries agreed about the boundary line, but not about the end of the Straits. The Chilean view was that the Straits ended at the boundary line and eastward continued the Atlantic Ocean and therefore Chile had a "beach" at (and its projection over) the Atlantic Ocean and it enjoyed sole control of the Straits themselves. The Argentine view was that the Straits continued eastward of the border and that the east end of the Straits of Magellan belonged to Argentina. Under this view, it was co proprietor with the right to co-regulate the navigation through the Straits and Chile had no border with the Atlantic Ocean.

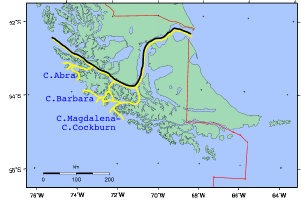
Two claimed definitions of the west mouth of the Straits of Magellan. The black line is the Chilean view of a single mouth, the yellow line represents the Argentine view which included several channels as part of the Straits for navigation treaty purposes

The west end of the Straits of Magellan was also a cause of conflict. Argentina considered the channels and bays part of the straits and demanded free navigation through all waters as stipulated in the Boundary Treaty of 1881 for the Straits.

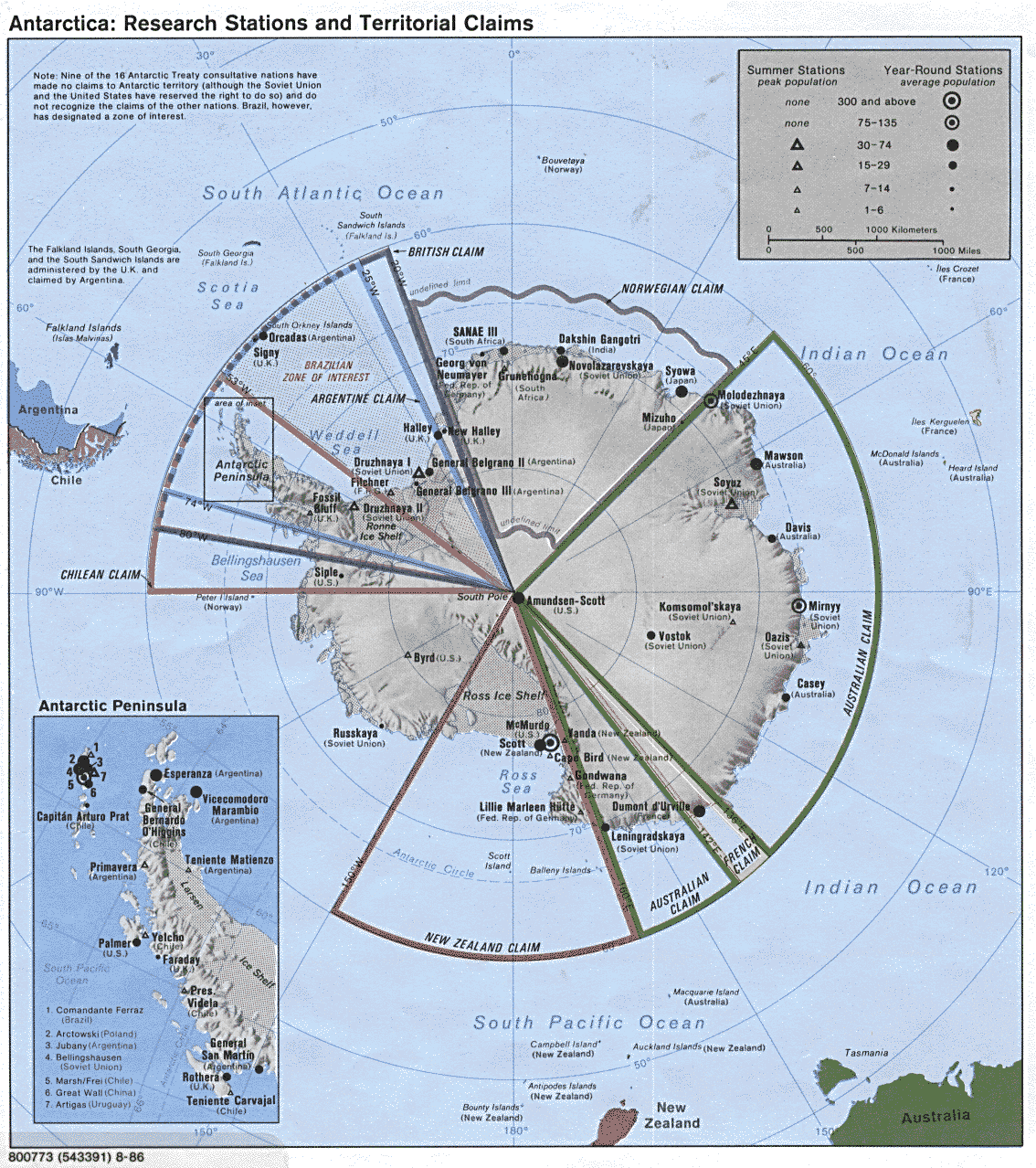
The map shows the overlapping projection of the countries over the Antarctic

On 14 July 1977, the Chilean Government issued the decree n°416 over the baselines (See Chilean Baselines Map). The decree had two main implications for the controversy. First, it extended the range from which Chile might attempt to project its 12-mile territorial sea and 200-mile Exclusive Economic Zone along a continued line from Picton, Nueva, and Lennox Islands as far south as Cape Horn, thus greatly increasing its potential maritime jurisdiction to the east and southeast. Second, it effectively converted all waters enclosed by the baselines into Chilean internal waters where navigational rights for Argentina would exist only through explicit agreements with Chile. The Argentine port of Ushuaia, located on the north shore of the east Beagle Channel, had no direct free way to the Pacific Ocean through Argentine waters. Argentina has so far considered its unfettered use of the waters surrounding the Fuegian Archipelago to be a matter of critical importance for its commercial and military navigation.

The two countries have always linked their Antarctic claims to their continental possessions because the nearness and the projection of the countries over the Antarctic can substantiate a claim over territories.

== History of the conflict ==
Map of the Beagle conflict between Argentina & Chile.

Attempts to clear up the dispute were unsuccessful from 1904 until 1971.

=== Incidents ===
The increasing significance of the region led to various incidents and confrontations between Chile and Argentina around transit and fishing rights, which potentially could lead to full-scale war. The Snipe incident was the most serious incident to occur in the zone.

=== Beagle Channel Arbitration (1971–1977) ===
1977 Beagle Channel arbitration.

In 1971 Chile and Argentina signed an agreement formally submitting the Beagle Channel issue to binding arbitration under auspices of the UK's Queen Elizabeth II. The court that was to decide the controversy was composed of five judges selected by Chile and Argentina from the International Court of Justice at The Hague. The court of arbitration's final decision would be submitted to the British Crown, which was then to recommend acceptance or rejection of the award of the court but not to modify it. On 2 May 1977 the court ruled that the islands and all adjacent formations belonged to Chile. See the Report and decision of the Court of Arbitration. In their only meeting in 1974, Juan Perón, President of Argentina, told Augusto Pinochet, leading Chile, that he wished to solve the boundary issue.

On 25 January 1978 Argentina rejected the ruling, and attempted via military force to challenge the Chilean commitment to defend the territory, and to coerce Chile into negotiating a division of the islands that would produce a boundary consistent with Argentine claims.

=== Direct negotiations (1977–1978) ===
Direct negotiations between Chile and Argentina began after the announcement of the binding arbitration ruling, on 2 May 1977, and ended with the Act of Montevideo, Uruguay, on 9 January 1979, where both countries accepted papal mediation after Argentina aborted Operation Soberanía.

In the interim, both countries deployed military forces, moving to the brink of open warfare in tandem with a frenzy of diplomatic activity. This was the most dangerous phase of the Beagle conflict; open warfare seemed a real possibility

=== Operation Soberanía (1978) ===
On 22 December 1978 Argentina initiated Operation Soberanía, an attempt via military force to occupy the islands around Cape Horn, intending to judge from Chile's response whether to advance further. However, the operation was aborted within a few hours. Instead of renewing the operation at the next window of opportunity, the junta in Buenos Aires decided to allow the Pope to mediate the dispute through the offices of Cardinal Antonio Samoré, his special envoy.

=== Papal mediation (1979–1984) ===
On 9 January 1979, the Act of Montevideo was signed pledging both sides to a peaceful solution and a return to the military situation of early 1977.

The Pope proposed in 1980 a solution that was accepted by Chile and rejected by Argentina.

The detention of alleged spies on both sides of the border, the following border closure by Argentina on 28 April 1981, and the Argentine repudiation of the General Treaty on the Judicial Settlement of Disputes in January 1982 maintained the danger of war. Six weeks before the Falklands War, Argentina provoked the ARA Gurruchaga incident with Chile at Deceit Island.

=== The Falklands War (1982) ===
Anglo-Chilean relations had been deteriorating since the Sheila Cassidy Affair in 1973.

In 1982, Argentina went to war against the United Kingdom over the Falkland Islands. The Argentine plan included the military occupation of the disputed islands at the Beagle channel after the invasion of the Falklands, as stated by Brigadier Basilio Lami Dozo, chief of the Argentine Air Force during the Falklands war, in an interview with the Argentine magazine Perfil:

L. F. Galtieri said: "[Chile] have to know that what we are doing now, because they will be the next in turn.

In 1982, Argentina still secretly considered Chile an enemy. Chile, perhaps suspecting an Argentine invasion, argued that it was not bound to support Argentina against the UK under the Inter-American Treaty of Reciprocal Assistance because that treaty was defensive in nature, while Argentina was the aggressor in this case and both Chile and Argentina deployed their respective militaries to the border.

The common challenge made the chance of military co-operation between the UK and Chile a distinct possibility, and during the war Chile provided the UK with limited, but significant information. One of the reasons for the absence of higher numbers of professional mountain warfare soldiers on the Falkland Islands, such as the 6th Mountain Brigade, was that these forces had to be deployed along the Chilean border in case hostilities broke out with the Chilean Armed Forces.

=== Treaty of Peace and Friendship of 1984 between Chile and Argentina ===
Tensions between Argentina and Chile did not subside until the democratic government of Raúl Alfonsín took office in Argentina in December 1983. Still isolated diplomatically due to the War, the Alfonsín administration made great efforts to stabilise the border situation. Without the support of the opposition, Alfonsín called for a non-binding referendum on 25 November 1984, which produced a result of 82.6% in favour of the second papal proposal. The voting was close only in the territory of Tierra del Fuego, which included the Argentine sector of the disputed Beagle Channel and many military personnel. Even there the vote was narrowly in favour of the treaty. On 29 November 1984, Argentina and Chile signed a protocol of agreement to a treaty in the Vatican City giving the islands to Chile but maritime rights to Argentina.

== Cultural impact ==
=== Books ===
Several books have been written about the conflict, the Operation Soberanía and the comparison of the outcome of the Falklands and the Beagle conflict (see Literature).

Given that the military critical phase of both conflicts occurred within almost three years (December 1978 – April 1982), the conflicts have been analysed as a case for the prospect theory or the role of the mass media in the use of force.

=== Geography ===
The mountain pass of Puyehue was renamed Cardenal Antonio Samoré Pass for Antonio Samoré, one of the mediators from the Vatican state in the conflict.

=== Art ===
Leon Gieco created the song "Sólo le pido a Dios" ("I only Ask of God") in 1978 as a response to the warmongering in Argentina. Three years later, during the Falklands War, the Argentine junta used the song against the Falklands War after the invasion.

In 2005 the Chilean film Mi Mejor Enemigo (My Best Enemy) was released. The film recreates the story of a simple recruit in late 1978 when both countries were on the brink of war.

Three TV productions about the conflict (in Spanish) focus on Operation Soberanía:

- Chilean Telecast of Televisión Nacional de Chile "Informe Especial", Theme: "El año que vivimos en peligro" ("The year when we lived in danger")
- Chilean Telecast of Corporación de Televisión de la Pontificia Universidad Católica de Chile "Anónimos", Theme: "Beagle: La guerra que no fue" ("Beagle: The war that wasn't")
- Argentine Telecast of History Channel: "Operativo Soberanía"

== Economic impact ==
The arms race at both sides of the border after the Argentine refusal of the decision of the Court of Arbitration caused huge costs for the economy of the countries, until after the Falklands War:

	1976	1977	1978	1979	1980	1981
Chile						
Defence spending*	487	566	713	951	1,128	949
Percentage of the GNP	3.5	3.5	4.1	4.6	5.2	
Argentina						
Defence spending*	2,702	2,225	2,339	2,641	2,126	2,241
Percentage of the GNP	2.2	2.0	2.3	2.5	2.0	
* Costs in millions of 1979 United States dollars.

== Aftermath ==
The Beagle conflict was argued in legal and juridical terms, although it was eventually resolved as a political compromise.

During the 1990s, under the presidency of Carlos Menem in Argentina and Eduardo Frei Ruiz-Tagle in Chile, they resolved almost all of their disputes and both countries began to work together both economically and militarily.

In 1994, the Laguna del Desierto dispute was solved; an international tribunal awarded almost the whole zone to Argentina. After a refused appeal in 1995, Chile accepted the award.

The Southern Patagonian Ice Field section of the border is the last remaining land border issue between Chile and Argentina. On 1 August 1991, the governments of Chile and Argentina agreed on a borderline, but the agreement was never ratified by the Argentine legislature. Later, in 1998, both governments agreed to redraw the borderline between Mount Fitz Roy and Daudet. Section A of the agreement (between Cerro Murallón and Daudet) and a small part of B (from Fitz Roy to a point defined to the west) was drawn; however, they also agreed that section B (from Fitz Roy to Murallón) would wait until completion of a detailed 1:50,000 scale map of the area with further negotiations. To date, this one section remains the final non-concluded boundary section and has been an irritant in Argentina-Chile relations.

A number of prominent public officials in Chile still point to past Argentine treaty repudiations when referring to relations between the two neighbours.

After the extended continental shelf concept was applied by Argentina to try to claim sea at the south of the point F of the 1984 agreement, the dispute over 5,302 km^{2} (2,047 sq mi) of sea in the Southern Zone Sea started between both countries. Chile claims the area as non-extended continental shelf projected from the Diego Ramírez Islands, and claims that concept has prevalence over the extended one.

== See also ==
- Argentina–Chile relations
- South American dreadnought race
- Falklands War
- Dispute over the extended continental shelf in the Southern Sea between Argentina and Chile

== Literature ==
- Beagle Channel Arbitration between the Republic of Argentina and the Republic of Chile, Report and Decision of the Court of Arbitration
- Mark Laudy: The Vatican Mediation of the Beagle Channel Dispute: Crisis Intervention and Forum Building in Words Over War of Carnegie Commission on Preventing Deadly Conflict.
- Alejandro Luis Corbacho: Predicting the Probability of War During Brinkmanship Crises: The Beagle and the Malvinas Conflicts, Universidad del CEMA, Argentina, Documento de Trabajo No. 244, September 2003
- Rubén Madrid Murúa: "La Estrategia Nacional y Militar que planificó Argentina, en el marco de una estrategia total, para enfrentar el conflicto con Chile el año 1978", Memorial del Ejército de Chile, Edición Nº 471, Santiago, Chile, 2003, Spanish
- Karin Oellers-Frahm: Der Schiedsspruch in der Beagle-Kanal-Streitigkeit, Berichte und Urkunden: Max-Planck-Institut für ausländisches öffentliches Recht und Völkerrecht, German
- Sergio Gutiérrez Olivos, Comentarios sobre el tratado de paz y amistad con Argentina, Academia Chilena de Ciencias Sociales, 1985, in Spanish
- Ministerio de Relaciones Exteriores de Chile: Relaciones Chileno-Argentinas, La controversia del Beagle. Genf 1979, English and Spanish
- Andrea Wagner: Der argentinisch-chilenische Konflikt um den Beagle-Kanal. Ein Beitrag zu den Methoden friedlicher Streiterledigung. Verlag Peter Lang, Frankfurt a.M. 1992, ISBN 3-631-43590-8, German
- Karl Hernekamp: Der argentinisch-chilenisch Grenzstreit am Beagle-Kanal. Institut für Iberoamerika-Kunde, Hamburg 1980, German
- Andrés Cisneros y Carlos Escudé, "Historia general de las Relaciones Exteriores de la República Argentina", Las relaciones con Chile, Cema, Argentina, Buenos Aires. Spanish
- Annegret I. Haffa: Beagle-Konflikt und Falkland (Malwinen)-Krieg. Zur Außenpolitik der Argentinischen Militarregierung 1976–1983. Weltforum Verlag, München/Köln/London 1987, ISBN 3-8039-0348-3, German
- Carlos Escudé und Andrés Cisneros: Historia general de las relaciones exteriores de la República Argentina (here), in spanischer Sprache.
- Fabio Vio Valdivieso: La mediación de su S.S. el Papa Juan Pablo II, Editorial Aconcagua, Santiago de Chile, 1984, Spanish
- Patricia Arancibia Clavel, and Francisco Bulnes Serrano: La Escuadra en Acción, 1978: el conflicto Chile–Argentina visto a través de sus protagonistas, Santiago de Chile, Grijalbo, 2005, Spanish
- Alberto Marín Madrid: El arbitraje del Beagle y la actitud argentina. 1984, Editorial Moisés Garrido Urrea, id = A-1374-84 XIII, Spanish
- Luis Alberto Romero, Argentina in the twentieth Century. Pennsylvania State University Press, translated by James P. Brennan, 1994, ISBN 0-271-02191-8
- Thomas Princen, Intermediaries in International Conflict, Princeton University Press, 1991, ISBN 0-691-07897-1
