= Presential sea =

Zone of influence beyond 200 nautical miles

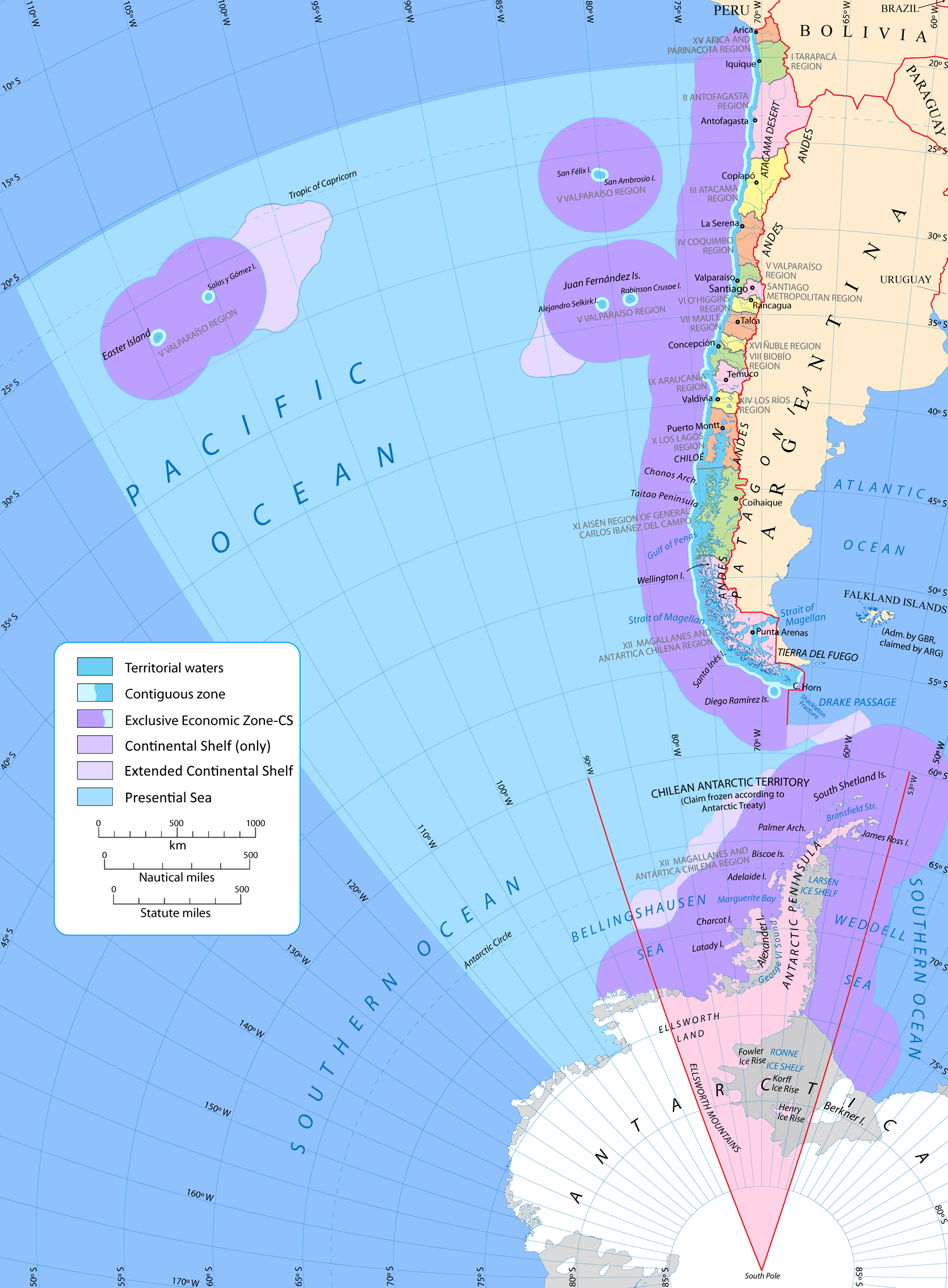
An example of a presential sea: the zone Chile declared as the Chilean Sea, its presential sea.

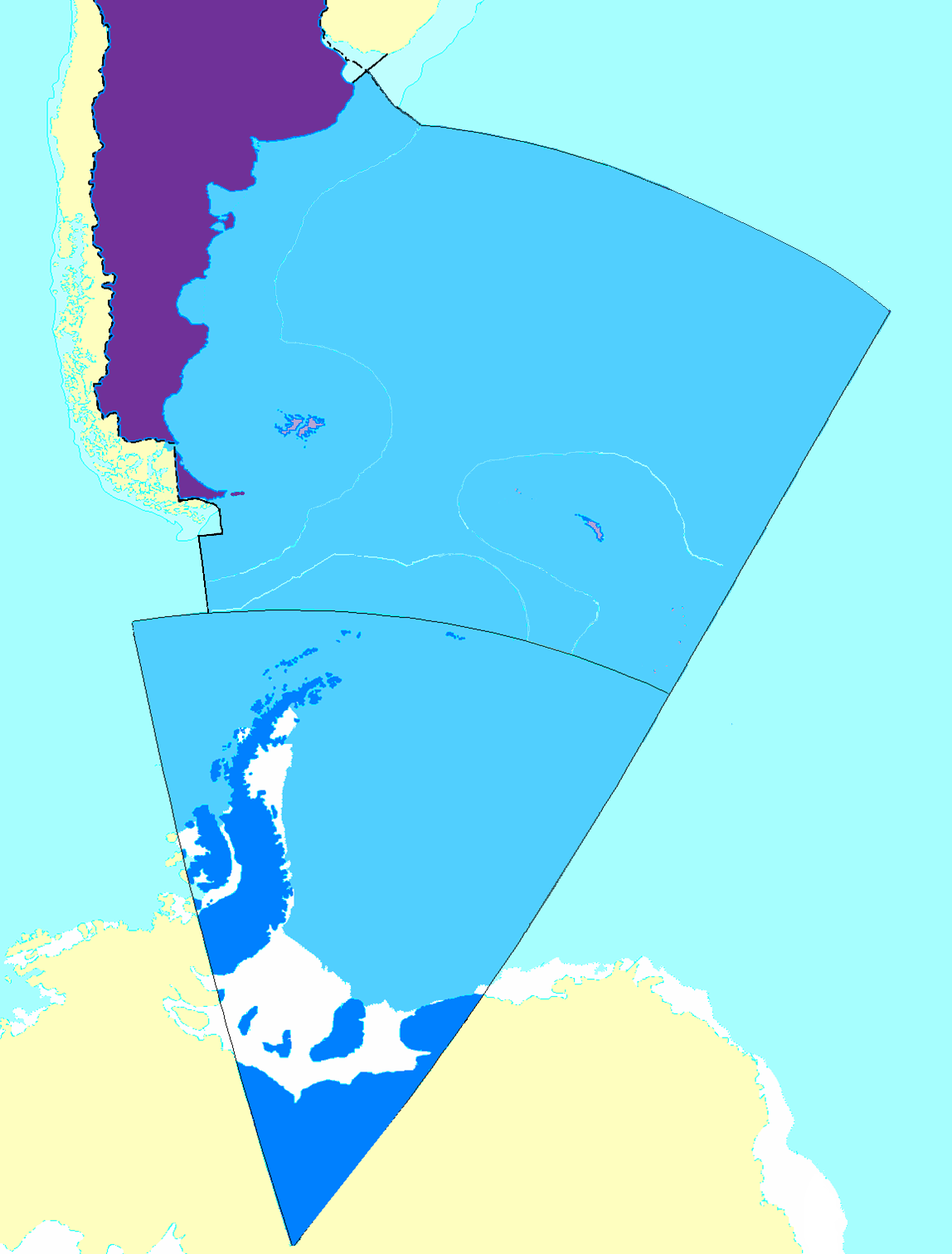
Argentine Heritage Marine Reserve, according to the legal project of Argentine Senator Mariano Utrera. A variety of areas are included within these borders, such as legally disputed areas, recognized claims, and high seas.

A presential sea, (In Spanish: mar presencial) zone of maritime presence or heritage marine reserve is a zone of influence demarcated by a maritime country in the high seas adjacent to its exclusive economic zone (EEZ). The objective of this oceanopolitical concept or doctrine is to signal to third parties where the coastal country's interests are, or could be directly involved.

Under this principle, a coastal nation (or several coastal nations, collectively) will demarcate areas of high seas contiguous or adjacent to their EEZ. Without claiming sovereignty over the international water in these areas, this demarcation serves as an announcement of a national interest in preserving the whole demarcated area from abusive uses or from certain activities whose proximity could impact marine resources inhabiting the nation's EEZ. A common stated intent is protecting highly migratory transboundary fish stocks from overfishing and ocean dumping.

The concept is currently not used officially by Argentina or Chile, as they adopted the extended continental shelf in their maps.

== Definition ==
A presential sea occurs when a state declares an interest in a maritime space, while still recognizing the liberties of any international waters it encompasses, in accordance with the United Nations Convention on the Law of the Sea. The objective of the policy is to ensure rational exploitation of resources, avoiding the overexploitation and subsequent collapse of delicate marine ecosystem equilibria. Part of the idea is that every coastal nation has a sovereign right to subsistence. If marine resources are intercepted and exhausted before they enter the EEZ and territorial waters of coastal states, these states will be deprived of oceanic resources which they would otherwise harvest in their jurisdictional waters. Accordingly, a state can prevent ships that are overexploiting its presential sea from calling its ports. The legal basis of this theory was partially weakened as a results of the 1995 Straddling Fish Stocks Agreement, which dealt with the management of transboundary species and highly migratory fish that freely travel between high seas and EEZs. A concrete application of the theory of presential sea occurred during the 1995 Turbot War, a conflict caused by the capture of a Spanish fishing vessel by the Canadian military.

== Origin of the concept ==
The "theory of the presential sea" was developed by a Commander-in-Chief of the Chilean Navy, Admiral Jorge Martínez Busch. First presented in a master's class on May 4, 1990, it was expanded in another master's class on May 2, 1991. The definition was later broadened into a more general concept of greater utility, and applicable to coastal states worldwide.

US Naval JAG officer Jane Dalton defined a presential sea as

"[...] the presential sea is a type of contiguous zone to the EEZ in which the state will prevent (and perhaps punish?) infringements of its fishing, research, and resource exploitation interests in the EEZ."

— Jane Gilliland Dalton, The Chilean presential sea: A Harmless Concept or a Dangerous Precedent?,

== Countries that have expressed presential sea interests ==
Most of the countries that have expressed presential sea interests have been neighbors of Chile, or on the Pacific coast of the Americas, especially South America. Besides Chile, Argentina, Ecuador, Peru, and Colombia have all proposed maritime areas that match the concept of presential sea. While Canada has not explicitly proposed a presential sea, it acted in a manner consistent with the concept during the Turbot War.

=== Chile ===
Chile created this theory, and was the first to implement one in 1991, with the passage of law N°19080. Article 1, final paragraph, defines the concept of a "presential sea" for the southeastern quadrant of the Pacific Ocean:

Es aquel espacio oceánico comprendido entre el límite de la Zonas Económicas Exclusivas que generan las islas chilenas al interior de dicho espacio marítimo. transl. That oceanic space which encompasses the outermost borders of the Exclusive Economic Zones generated by the Chilean islands to the interior of that maritime space.

— Chilean Law 19.080,

As a result of this Chile had an international dispute with the European Union over swordfish. The preliminary treaty gave international backing to the presential sea theory. The presential sea concept has been legally enshrined by Chilean legislation in the General Law of Fishing, the Basic General Law of the Environment, and in the law of Nuclear Security.

=== Colombia, Ecuador, Peru and Chile ===
Under the 1997 “Acuerdo Marco para la Conservación de los Recursos Vivos Marinos en la Alta Mar del Pacífico Sudeste” (transl. Framework Agreement for the Conservation of Living Marine Resources in the High Seas of the Southeast Pacific) or the "Galapagos Agreement", Colombia, Ecuador, Peru, and Chile proposed a "Regional presential sea of the CPPS» (Comisión Permanente del Pacífico Sur (transl. Permanent Commission of the South Pacific). This agreement attempts to protect certain species of migratory fish, including in international waters. Additional steps have been taken to establish a Southeast Pacific Marine Protected Area.

=== Argentina ===
In Argentina Senator Mariano Utrera led a legislative project to mark out a presential sea space called "Fixing the borders of the Argentine National Heritage Sea Reserve." The law was presented to the Senate and Chamber of Deputies November 27, 1987.

On April 30, 1989, the proposed legislation expired without being passed. However the concept can still be observed in what is referred to as "La Milla 201" (transl. Mile 201, referring to the first mile outside of the EEZ), where Argentina carries out regular patrols against illegal fishing.

=== Canada ===
The Turbot War between Canada and Spain generated a concrete application of the theory. Canada fired shots across the bow and seized the Spanish fishing trawler Estai in waters adjacent to its EEZ, which caused the European Union to get involved. The case went to the Hague, was judged in Canada's favor, and Spain was forced to pay a substantial fine.
