= Hydrographic and Oceanographic Service of the Chilean Navy =

SHOA or Servicio Hidrográfico y Oceanográfico de la Armada de Chile (Spanish for Hydrographic and Oceanographic Service of the Chilean Navy) is an agency of the Chilean Navy managing situations dealing with hydrography and oceanography, including tides and tsunamis.

SHOA has faced severe criticism after the 2010 Chile earthquake, the largest earthquake since the 1960 Valdivia earthquake. Criticism include the lack of coordination with other authorities and the ONEMI (Chile's emergency office). ONEMI, SHOA and the government have been accused of the initial neglect of the tsunami warning sent by the Pacific Tsunami Warning Center which resulted in the deaths of hundred of persons. The director of SHOA Mariano Rojas was removed from office and replaced by Patricio Carrasco due to his responsibility over the failed tsunami warning.
