= Extended continental shelf =

Type of maritime area

The extended continental shelf, scientific continental shelf, or outer continental shelf refers to a type of maritime area established as a geo-legal paradigm by the United Nations Convention on the Law of the Sea (UNCLOS). Through the process known as the extension of the outer limit of the continental shelf or establishment of the outer edge of the continental margin, every coastal state has the privilege, granted by the international community of nations, to acquire exclusive and perpetual rights to exploit the biotic and abiotic resources found on the seabed and subsoil of these maritime areas. These areas are located beyond the 200 nautical miles (370 km; 230 mi) that make up the state's exclusive economic zone (EEZ) and would otherwise be considered international waters.

In these deep-water areas, resource exploitation has been either technically impossible with available methods or otherwise economically unfeasible. Recently, however, sustained scientific and industrial progress and new technologies have enabled these oceanic waters to become increasingly accessible, which gives these areas extraordinary geopolitical and geoeconomic importance.

== Differences with other concepts of continental shelves ==
In the case of the scientific or extended continental shelf, the coastal state to which it has been granted is the only one entitled to exploit the natural resources found in the seabed and subsoil, whether mineral resources or other non-living resources, as well as living organisms. This includes those organisms that penetrate the seabed or have sedentary habits, defined as those that remain immobile on the seabed during exploitation or move in permanent physical contact with it.

This type of maritime space differs significantly from the geomorphological concept of a continental shelf, which is similar to an epicontinental sea. This concept identifies the submerged extensions of the landmass of the coastal state up to depths of 200 meters (660 ft).

It also differs from the concept of the legal continental shelf, which refers to the right of states to exploit their maritime projections up to the limit of 200 nautical miles (370 km; 230 mi) (regardless of the characteristics of the seabed or its depths, and whether or not there is an extension of the coast under the sea) measured from their baselines (exclusive economic zone or EEZ). In this concept, the rights to exploit the seabed and subsoil are combined with rights over the water column and surface.

Scientific or extended shelves are always located in maritime areas more than 200 nautical miles (370 km; 230 mi) from the straight baselines from which the width of the territorial sea is measured, and they do not extend beyond 350 nautical miles (650 km; 400 mi) at the maximum.

== History and characteristics ==
The creation and implementation of this legal concept, which allows coastal states to enjoy exclusive rights over vast oceanic territories, stems from the United Nations Convention on the Law of the Sea (UNCLOS), specifically in Part VI. This multilateral treaty was approved in April 1982 and came into force on 16 November 1994, a year after its ratification by Guyana, which fulfilled the requirement that at least 60 signatory states ratify it.

The regulations developed and issued by UNCLOS have global application. The meeting of the states that are part of the convention established the Commission on the Limits of the Continental Shelf (CLCS), and the validation of the commission gives political and legal legitimacy. This commission is based at the United Nations headquarters in New York.

For a coastal state to acquire rights over scientific continental shelves, it must rigorously follow specific steps. First, it must submit a detailed report to the CLCS, in which the state must demonstrate its rights over a specific area, outlined in a cartographic presentation. This process must consider the scientific-technical guidelines established by UNCLOS, and the report must be based on extensive data collection, including surveys and various scientific analyses, such as gravimetric, bathymetric, magnetometric, geological, geophysical, morphological, seismic, sedimentological studies, etc. Specialists in multiple disciplines, including oceanography, hydrography, geography, cartography, law, and international law, participate in this effort.

The CLCS, through a subcommission of seven members from a total of 21 technical experts in hydrography, geophysics, and geology, reviews the claim. They carefully examine the state's arguments, the technical data, and the accompanying maps. The commission can request clarifying meetings, make recommendations for modifications, or provide scientific-technical advice, potentially reprocessing the submitted data.

After completing the analysis, the subcommission issues draft recommendations, which are then approved by the full commission. If the state follows these recommendations, the new limits are validated. If the commission finds excessive extensions, it may recommend adjustments, leaving disputed sections in suspense. The state may accept or revise its claim, and after further review, the commission may finally validate the submission.

Under UNCLOS Article 76.8, once the CLCS validates a state's outer limit, it is definitive and binding, enforceable against third-party states, and internationally mandatory.

Legally, the boundary is drawn by the state itself, with the CLCS only providing recommendations to ensure compliance with UNCLOS requirements. This ensures that the extension aligns with the rights developed under the convention.

The coastal state will submit to the secretary-general of the United Nations cartography, geodetic data, and additional information describing the new outer limit, permanently established, who upon receiving them will give them appropriate dissemination so that such limits are respected by the community of nations.

=== Formulas for measuring the outer edge of the continental margin ===
Schematic cross section of a continental shelf. Sediment Rock Mantle

UNCLOS, in Article 76, established complex scientific-technical guidelines that all coastal states must follow when estimating the extent of their continental shelf. These guidelines are synthesized into a combination of 4 rules—2 formulas and 2 restrictions. These standards were debated and agreed upon over several years, finally being approved in New York City on 13 May 1999, during the fifth session.

The procedure for states wishing to expand their maritime area begins with locating the foot of the continental slope, defined as the point of greatest change in gradient at its base. Once this point is identified, formula lines are drawn to find the farthest outer envelope, which will correspond to the outer edge of the continental shelf that the state intends to defend. Each state will choose the formula to use in each section, applying the most convenient based on seabed features and distances, to achieve the greatest possible extension of exclusive continental shelf.

Each formula was proposed by a geologist, and its technical name bears the scientist's last name:

==== Gardiner formula or sediment thickness formula ====
Its application results in a line drawn through fixed points where the sedimentary rock thickness is at least 1% of the shortest distance between that point and the foot of the slope.

==== Hedberg formula or distance formula ====
When applied, a line is drawn through fixed points located no more than 60 nautical miles from the foot of the continental slope.

Subsequently, the proposal obtained is evaluated through the belonging test, in which it must be demonstrated that the continental shelf extends beyond 200 nautical miles (370 km; 230 mi) measured from the baselines.

In the next step, restriction rules are applied, which are two:

- No point of the claimed area can exceed 350 nautical miles (650 km; 400 mi) measured from the baselines;
- No point of the claimed area can exceed a distance of 100 nautical miles (190 km; 120 mi) measured from the line where the 2,500-meter (8,200 ft) isobath is located.

By combining the selected formula in the segment with the restrictions applied, the outer limits of the extended continental shelf are traced, with all segments ultimately joining in a continuous line.

=== Deadlines for submissions ===
It was established that May 2009 would be the deadline for each state party to UNCLOS to submit a report to the CLCS, arguing their claim for expansion, which could be complete or only for a section. States that submitted on time were allowed to include new supplementary information on other claimed areas in later submissions. A state that did not submit its report by the deadline was disqualified from doing so. In the case of a state that has not yet ratified UNCLOS, any self-initiated maritime boundary expansion has no legal value. It will only acquire rights if it first adheres to the convention, after which it must submit its studies to the CLCS. A 10-year period is granted for this, starting from the date of ratification; if the state fails to submit within this decade, it will lose its right to expansion permanently.

=== Disputed maritime territories ===
Map of the dispute over the extended continental shelf in the Southern Zone Sea between Argentina and Chile.

The procedures established by UNCLOS are based on the principle that "land dominates the sea", meaning the status of maritime spaces legitimated by its bodies derives from the status of the coastal landmasses. If the CLCS encounters overlapping jurisdiction claims or pending conflicts during the extension process—i.e., ocean areas claimed by two or more countries, including those projected from disputed islands—any submission concerning those areas will not be examined or evaluated, as the commission cannot intervene on the substantive issue. Instead, the tracing or definitive allocation will be postponed, subject to the outcome of other legal bodies or negotiation mechanisms appropriate to the nature of these disputes, such as treaties, settlements, negotiations between the parties, mediation, rulings from international courts, etc.

Only if the claimants submit a joint presentation to the CLCS—a suggestion that has even been encouraged by the commission itself—or express their consent, will the delimitation not prejudice the final legal settlement.

In July 2023, the International Court of Justice ruled on the priority of a Continental Shelf over an Extended Continental Shelf in the case of the territorial and maritime dispute between Colombia and Nicaragua.

Under the terms of the United Nations Convention on the Law of the Sea Article 59 disputed and overlapping claims have no legal force until the dispute is resolved between the opposing parties.

CONVEMAR is an advisory commission that makes recommendations which are not legally binding, and the commission has no jurisdiction over sovereignty issues.

On 19 December 2023 (2 years ago), the United States Department of State announced the results of its "U.S. Extended Continental Shelf Project". It declared an expansion in the outer boundaries of the United States continental shelf in numerous regions. The U.S. Extended Continental Shelf partially overlaps with ECS areas of Canada, The Bahamas, and Japan. In these areas, the United States and these countries will need to establish maritime boundaries in the future.

== See also ==
- Continental margin
- Continental shelf of Chile
- Continental shelf of Russia
- Continental shelf of the United States
- Convention on the Continental Shelf
- Dispute over the extended continental shelf in the Southern Zone Sea between Argentina and Chile
- Disputed Territories
- International Tribunal for the Law of the Sea
- Territorial claims in the Arctic#Russia
- Territorial waters
