= Arctic Basin =

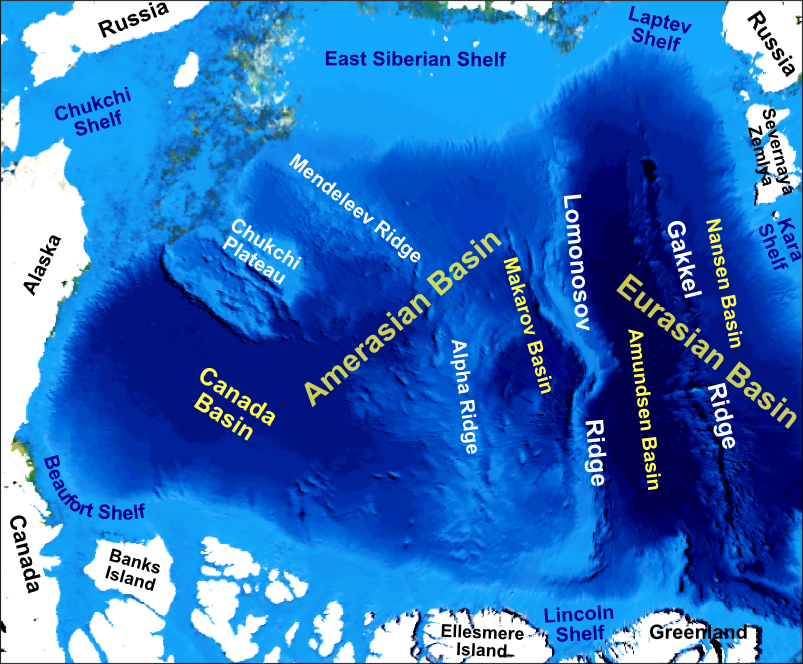
Main bathymetric features of the Arctic Ocean

The Arctic Basin (also North Polar Basin) is an oceanic basin in the Arctic Ocean, consisting of two main parts separated by the Lomonosov Ridge, a mid-ocean ridge between north Greenland and the New Siberian Islands. It is bordered by the continental shelves of Eurasia and North America.

- The Eurasian Basin (also Norwegian Basin) consists of the Nansen Basin (formerly: Fram Basin) and the Amundsen Basin
- The Amerasia Basin consists of the Canada Basin and the Makarov Basin

== Exploration ==
Fridtjof Nansen and Otto Sverdrup sailed the basin in the Fram from 1893 to 1896. Between 1922 and 1924, Roald Amundsen followed in the Maud.
