= Arctica =

Ancient continent in the Neoarchean era

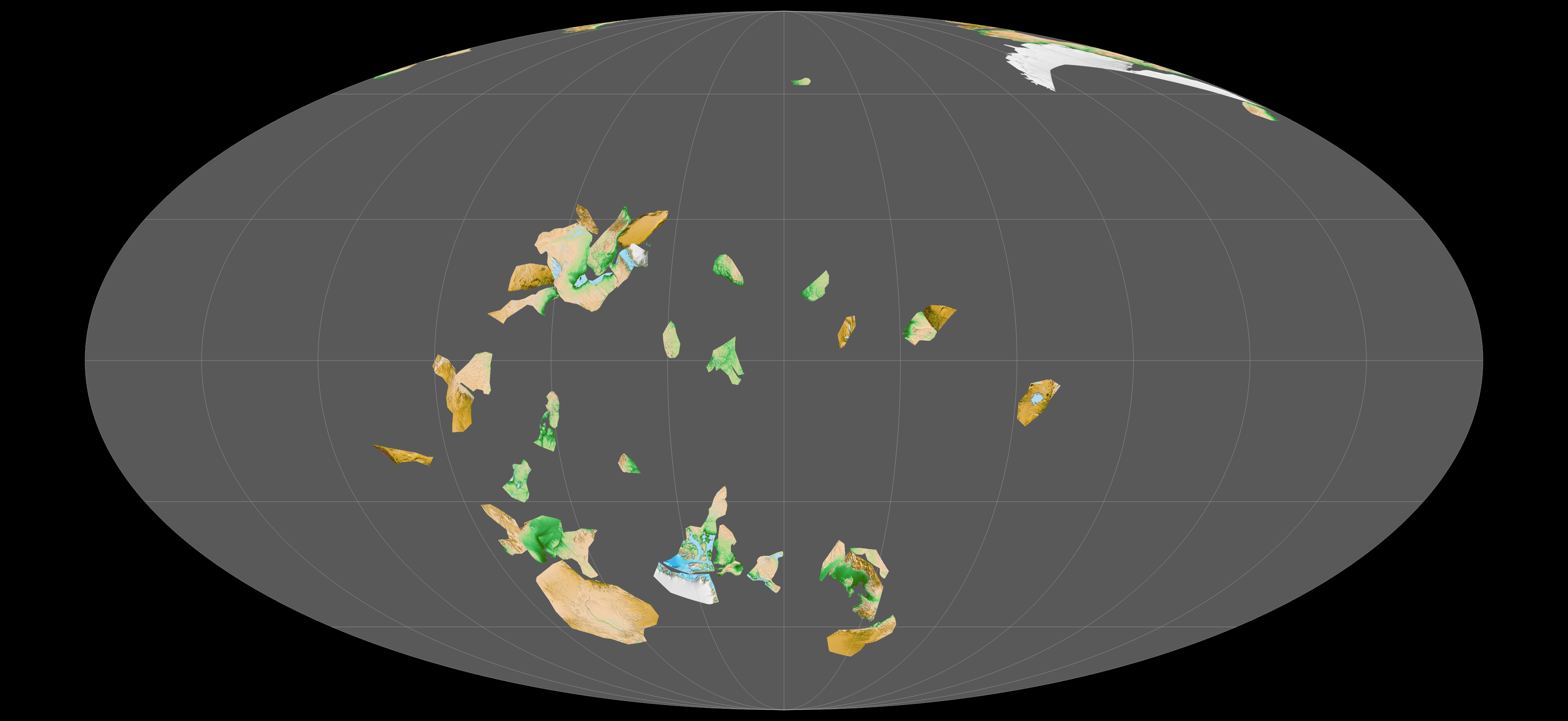
- Arctica, 2400 Ma (Siderian)

Historical continent
- Formed: 2565 Ma
- Type: Paleocontinent
- Today part of: Siberian craton; Slave Craton; Wyoming Craton; Superior Craton; North Atlantic Craton

Arctica or Arctida is a hypothetical ancient continent which formed approximately 2.565 billion years ago in the Neoarchean era. It was made of Archaean cratons, including the Siberian Craton, with its Anabar/Aldan shields in Siberia, and the Slave, Wyoming, Superior, and North Atlantic cratons in North America. Arctica was named by Rogers 1996 because the Arctic Ocean formed by the separation of the North American and Siberian cratons. Russian geologists writing in English call the continent "Arctida" since it was given that name in 1987, alternatively the Hyperborean craton, in reference to the hyperboreans in Greek mythology.

Nikolay Shatsky (Shatsky 1935) was the first to assume that the crust in the Arctic region was of continental origin. Shatsky, however, was a "fixist" and, erroneously, explained the presence of Precambrian and Paleozoic metamorphic rocks on the New Siberian, Wrangel, and De Long Islands with subduction. "Mobilists", on the other hand, also erroneously, proposed that North America had rifted from Eurasia and that the Arctic basins had opened behind a retreating Alaska.

== Precambrian continent ==
In his reconstruction of the supercontinent cycle, Rogers proposed that the continent Ur formed at about 3 Ga and formed East Gondwana in the Middle Proterozoic by accretion to East Antarctica; Arctica formed around 2.5–2 Ga by the amalgamation of the Canadian and Siberian shields plus Greenland; and Atlantica formed around 2 Ga by the amalgamation of the West African Craton and eastern South America. Arctica then grew around 1.5 Ga by accretion of East Antarctica and Baltica to form the supercontinent Nena. Around 1 Ga Nena, Ur, and Atlantica collided to form the supercontinent Rodinia.

Rogers & Santosh 2003 argued that most cratons that were around at 2.5 Ga most likely formed in a single region simply because they were located in a single region in Pangaea, which is the reason Rogers argued for the existence of Arctica. The core of Arctica was the Canadian Shield, which Williams et al. 1991 named Kenorland. They argued that this continent formed around 2.5 Ga and then rifted before reassembling along the 1.8 Ga Trans-Hudson and Taltson-Thelon orogenies. These two orogenies are derived from continental crust (not oceanic crust) and were probably intracontinental, leaving Kenorland intact from 2.5 Ga to the present. Correlations between orogenies in Canada and Siberia remain more controversial.

Laurentia and Baltica were connected during the Late Palaeoproterzoic (1.7–1.74 Ga) and Siberia later joined them. Paleomagnetic reconstructions indicate that they formed a single supercontinent during the Mesoproterozoic (1.5–1.45 Ga) but paleomagnetic data and geological pieces of evidence also suggest a considerable spatial gap between Siberia and Laurentia and Arctica is thought to be the missing link.

== Phanerozoic microcontinent ==
The current geological structure of the Arctic Region is the result of tectonic processes during the Mesozoic and Cenozoic (250 Ma to present) when the Amerasian and Eurasian basins formed, but the presence of Precambrian metamorphic complexes discovered in the 1980s indicated a continent once existed between Laurentia, Baltica, and Siberia.

In the reconstruction of Metelkin, Vernikovsky & Matushkin 2015, Arctica originally formed as a continent during the Tonian 950 Ma and became part of the supercontinent Rodinia. It reformed during the Permian-Triassic 255 Ma and became part of Pangaea. During this period the configuration of Arctica changed and the continent moved from near the Equator to near the North Pole while keeping its position between three major cratons: Laurentia, Baltica, and Siberia. An extended magmatic event, the High Arctic Large Igneous Province, broke Arctica in part 130–90 Ma, opened the Arctic Ocean, and left radiating dyke swarms across the Arctic.

Fragments of this continent include the Kara Shelf, New Siberian Islands, northern Alaska, Chukotka Peninsula, Inuit Fold Belt in northern Greenland, and two Arctic underwater ridges, the Lomonosov and Alpha-Mendeleev Ridges. More recent reconstructions also include Barentsia (including Svalbard and Timan-Pechora Plates). Remains of the last continent are now located on the Kara Sea Shelf, New Siberian Islands and adjacent shelf, Alaska north of Brooks Ridge, Chukchi Peninsula in easternmost Siberia, and fragments in northern Greenland and Northern Canada and in the submerged Lomonosov Ridge.

== See also ==
- Arctic Alaska-Chukotka terrane – Terrane that includes parts of Alaska, Siberia and the continental shelf between them
- Penokean orogeny
- Timanide Orogen – Orogen that formed during the Neoproterozoic
