= North Polar Basin =

North Polar Basin may refer to:

- North Polar Basin (Mars)
- Arctic Basin, abyssal features within the Arctic Ocean
