= Amundsen Basin =

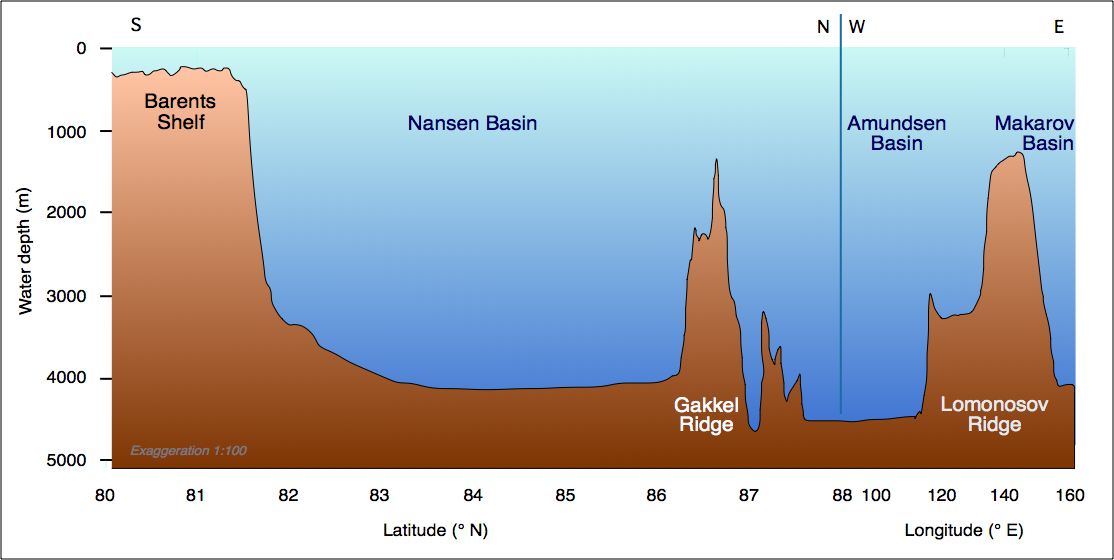
Profile of the Arctic Ocean from the Barents Sea towards the (geographic) North Pole

The Amundsen Basin, with depths up to 4.4 km (2.7 mi), is the deepest abyssal plain in the Arctic Ocean and is the site of the geographic North Pole. The Amundsen Basin is embraced by the Lomonosov Ridge (from 81°N 140°E to 80°N 40°W) and the Gakkel Ridge (from 81°N 120°E to 85°N 10°E). It is named after the polar researcher Roald Amundsen (1872–1928). Together with the Nansen Basin, the Amundsen Basin is often summarized as Eurasian Basin.

The Russian-American cooperation Nansen and Amundsen Basin Observational System (NABOS) aims "to provide a quantitative observationally based assessment of circulation, water mass transformations, and transformation mechanisms in the Eurasian and Canadian Basins of the Arctic Ocean".

== Formation ==
The Amundsen Basin formed during the Cenozoic Era from seafloor spreading.

== See also ==
- Wilkes Basin
