= Gakkel Ridge Caldera =

Ancient volcanic megacaldera

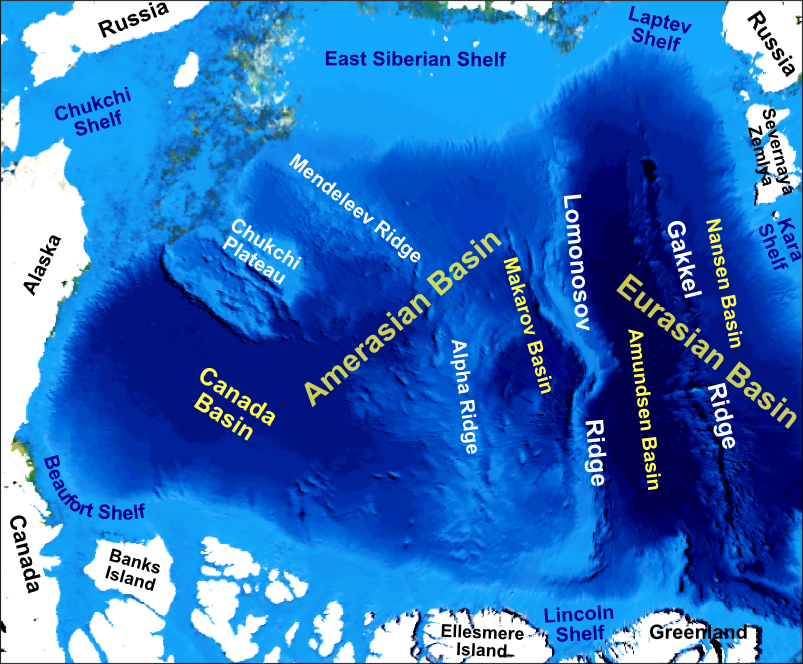
- Gakkel Ridge Caldera is a noticeable oblong hole-like depression in the Gakkel Ridge, located in the upper right part of this map.

Highest point
- Coordinates: 81°31′N 120°00′E

Dimensions
- Length: 80 km (50 mi)
- Width: 40 km (25 mi)

Geography
- Location: Gakkel Ridge, Arctic Ocean

Geology
- Last eruption: 1.1 Ma

Gakkel Ridge Caldera, also known as Gakkel Caldera, is a Pleistocene volcanic caldera located on the Gakkel Ridge beneath the Arctic Ocean, off the northern coast of Siberia. It erupted approximately 1.1 million years ago, with an estimated eruptive volume of 3,000 km^{3} (720 mi^{3}). This eruption places it at VEI-8 on the Volcanic Explosivity Index, making it one of the most explosive volcanoes on Earth during the Pleistocene along with Yellowstone Caldera and Lake Toba. It is the only known supervolcano located directly on a mid-ocean ridge.
