= Arctic Alaska-Chukotka terrane =

Terrane that includes parts of Alaska, Siberia and the continental shelf between them

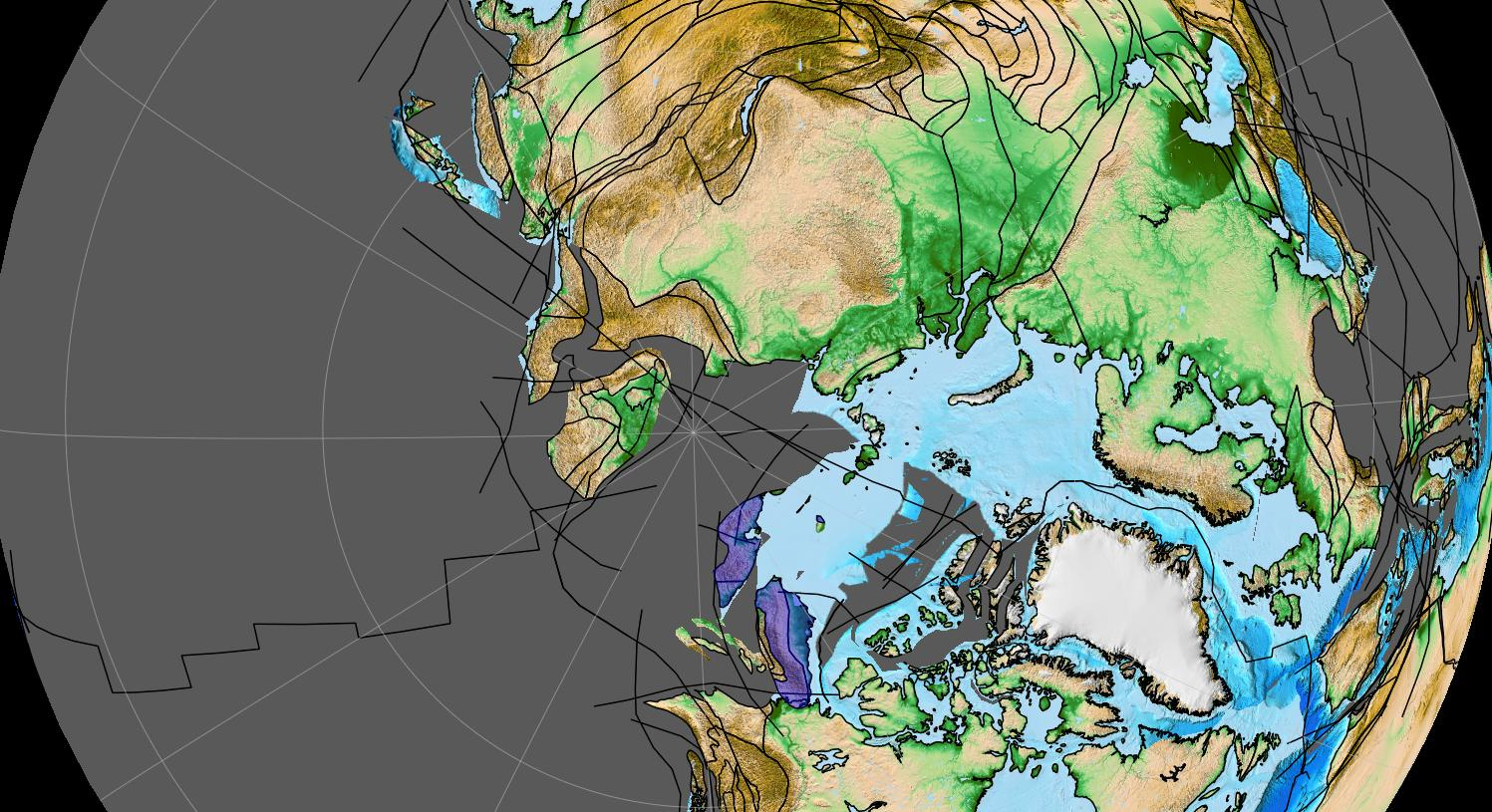
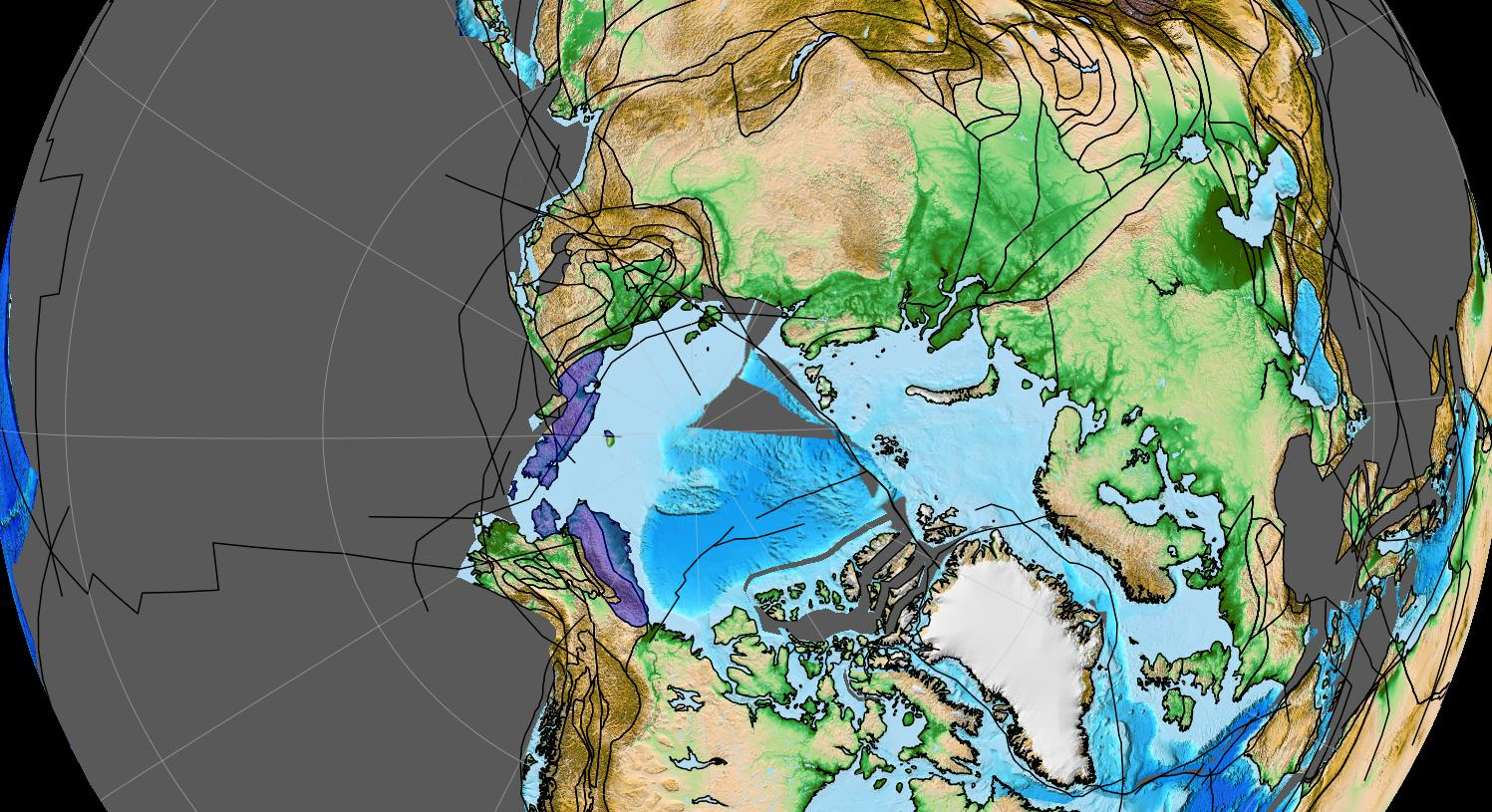
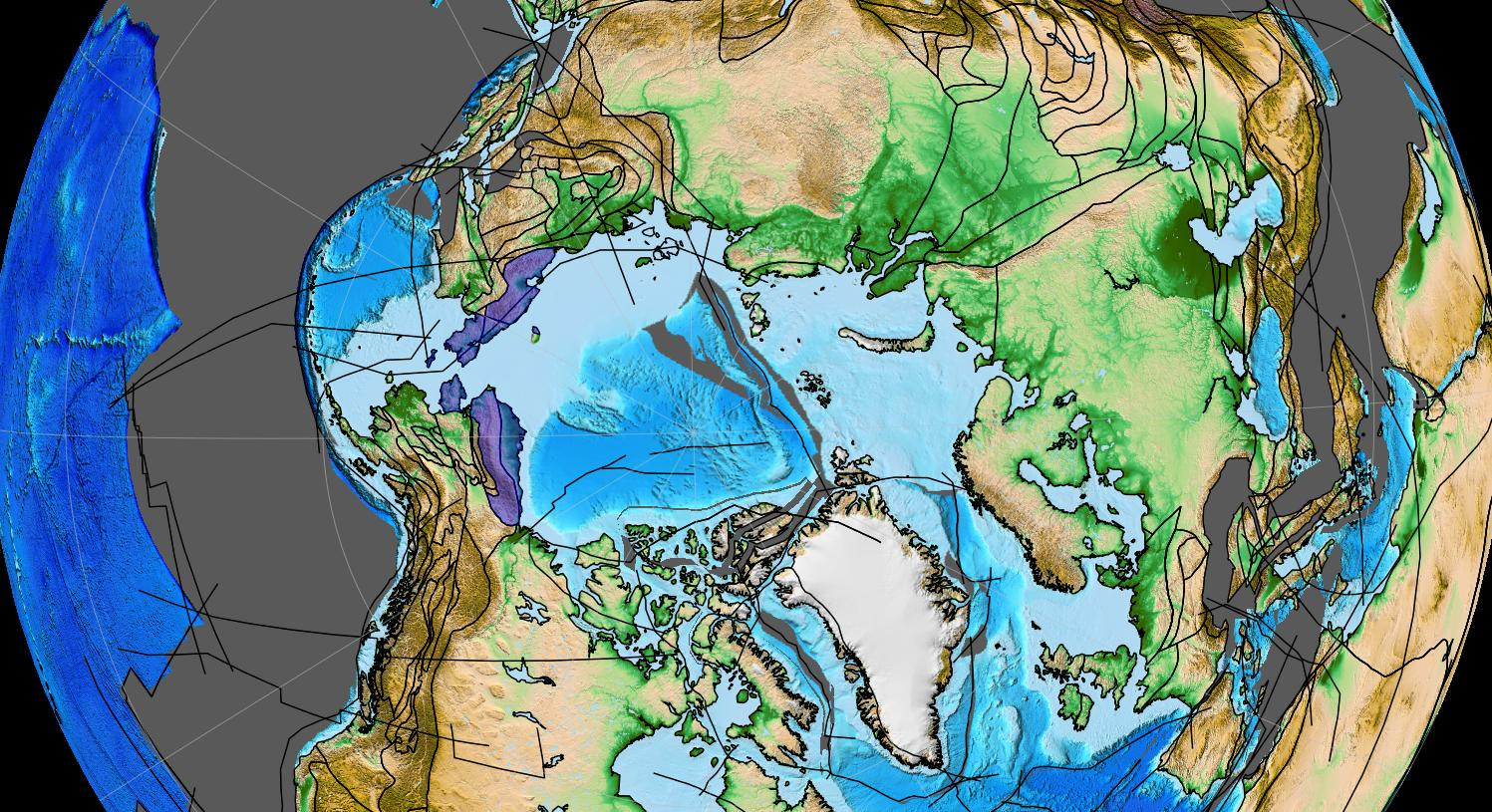
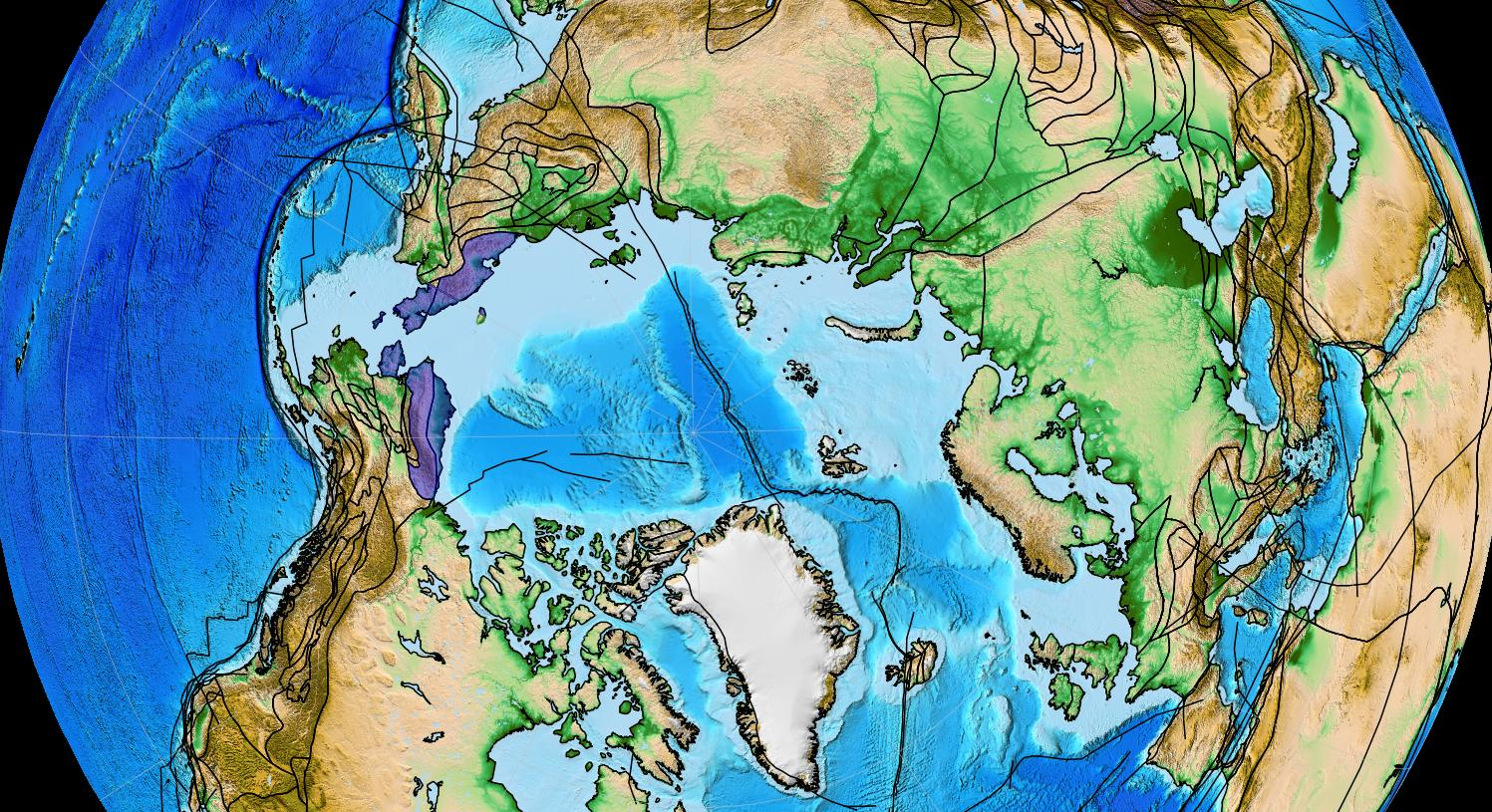
The Arctic Alaska-Chukotka terrane (in blue) at 150, 100, 50, and 0 Ma. View centered on the North Pole.

The Arctic Alaska-Chukotka terrane (AAC) is a microcontinent that today encompasses the North Slope, Brooks Range, and Seward Peninsula of northern Alaska; the Chukotka Peninsula, New Siberia Islands, and Wrangel Island in eastern Siberia; and the continental shelves of the Bering, Beaufort, and Chukchi seas. Comparable in size to Greenland, the AAC is the largest of the Neoproterozoic–early Paleozoic continental fragments now dispersed around the Arctic Ocean; some of which possibly formed the continent Arctida.

The AAC originated on the shores of the Iapetus Ocean and is a composite terrane made of fragments from the Baltica, Laurentia, and Siberia continents, as well as the ocean floor of the Panthalassic ocean. The AAC has a complex geological history that includes the Grenville, Timanian, Caledonian–Appalachian, and Ellesmerian orogenies.

The Proterozoic–Carboniferous histories of Arctic Alaska and Chukotka are similar but their Triassic–Jurassic histories are apparently distinct. Whether or not they were separate blocks before the Mesozoic opening of the Amerasia Basin is disputed. The age of the basement of the AAC remains enigmatic, hence also details about the microcontinent's ancient, tectonic history. It is, nevertheless, clear from Neoproterozoic igneous rocks that the AAC was not originally part of Laurentia, but most likely Baltica. The microcontinent was obviously involved in a series of magmatic events, beginning at c. 1.6–1.4 Ga, and ending in the Avalonia–Cadomian orogeny.
