= Laptev Sea Rift =

Tectonic boundary between the North American and Eurasian Plates

The Laptev Sea Rift is a divergent tectonic plate boundary between the North American Plate and the Eurasian Plate located on the Arctic Ocean coast of northeastern Siberia in Russia. The Laptev Sea Rift is the continuation of the Gakkel Ridge (Mid-Arctic Ridge) into the continental crust of Siberia. It starts offshore in the continental shelf and continues onshore to a point located in the Chersky Range where the boundary motion changes from extension to compression.
