= Remote and isolated community =

Canadian statistical designation

In Canada, the designations remote, isolated, outport and fly-in refer to a settlement that is either a long distance from larger settlements or lacks transportation links that are typical in more populated areas.

== Definition ==
In responding to the avian flu outbreak of 2009, a Canadian government body (Public Health Network H1N1 Task Force) published the following working definitions. The definition of isolated is borrowed from Indian and Northern Affairs Canada (INAC) and the definition of remote is borrowed from Health Canada.

Remote: describes a geographical area where a community is located over 350 km from the nearest service centre having year-round road access.

Isolated: describes a geographical area that has scheduled flights and good telephone services; however, it is without year-round road access. It is noted that not all homes in a community have phones, and that flights may be cancelled or delayed due to weather.

— Remote and Isolated Task Group, Considerations for Definitions of "Remote" and "Isolated" in the Context of Pandemic (H1N1) 2009 - Public Health Agency of Canada, p. 1

Canada also has fly-in communities that lack road, rail, or water connections and rely entirely on bush aviation. Other remote communities lack road and rail but have water access, such as the Newfoundland outports, and those that have road access part of the year on ice roads, or can only be reached by gravel road. One academic measure of remoteness used in Canada is nordicity, i.e. "northerliness".

== Healthcare in remote and isolated communities ==
In Canada, there were 79 nursing stations and over 195 health centres servicing remote communities in Northern Canada or on Indian reserves in the south. In about half these facilities, registered nurses are employed by Health Canada, a ministry of the government of Canada. In the other communities, nurses are employed by the Band Council.

== Policing in remote and isolated communities ==
Policing in remote areas presents many challenges, most obviously logistical, but also social and even psychological.

The Royal Canadian Mounted Police had 268 "isolated posts" in 2009. Isolated posts are defined by the Treasury Board of Canada as communities that face "unique challenges" related to small populations, harsh climates, and/or limited access by commercial transportation or all-weather roads. All posts located in Canada's three northern territories are considered isolated as well as many in the ten provinces. Many of these posts are "fly-in only"; the police force has its own RCMP Air Services, which does everything from ferry prisoners to court to bring in new computers to offices. In 2009, in the territory of Nunavut there were 25 detachments, all fly-in (no roads), and only one RCMP airplane.

== See also ==
- Extreme points of Canadian provinces
- Extreme communities of Canada
- Nordicity
- Outstation (Aboriginal community), a remote Australian community
