= Makarov Basin =

Coordinates: 88°N 140°E

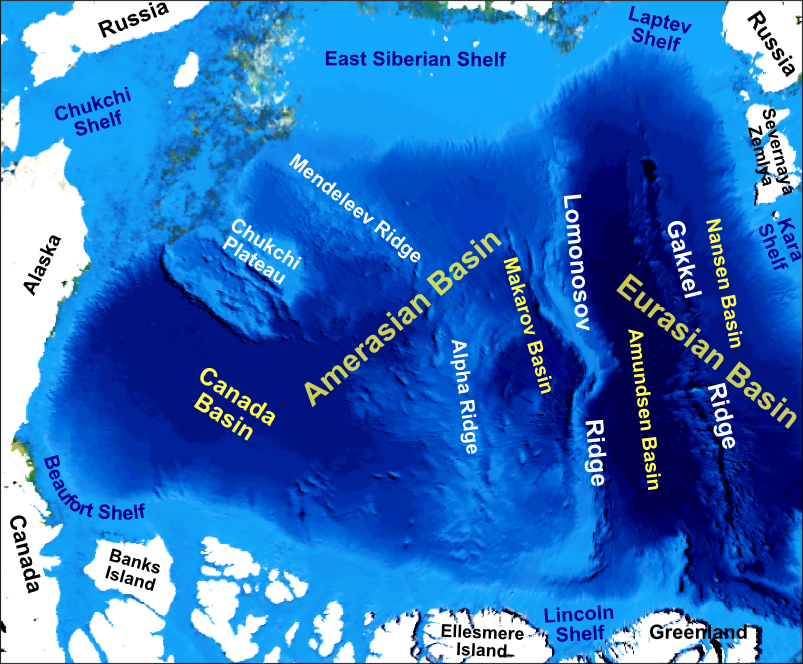
Main bathymetric/topographic features of the Arctic Ocean

The Makarov Basin is a seafloor basin in the Arctic Ocean, part of the Amerasian Basin. It lies between the Alpha Ridge and the Lomonosov Ridge.
