= Subarctic =

Region in the Northern Hemisphere immediately south of the true Arctic

Global map of the subarctic region

The subarctic zone is a region in the Northern Hemisphere immediately south of the true Arctic, north of hemiboreal regions and covering much of Alaska, Canada, Iceland, the north of Fennoscandia, Northwestern Russia, Siberia, and the Cairngorms. Generally, subarctic regions fall between 50°N and 70°N latitude, depending on local climates. Precipitation is usually low, and vegetation is characteristic of the taiga.

Daylight at these latitudes is quite extreme between summer and winter due to its high latitude. Near the summer solstice for instance, subarctic regions can experience an all-night period of either civil, nautical, or astronomical twilight (or in the northern reaches full daylight), since the sun never dips more than 18 degrees below the horizon. Noctilucent clouds are best observed within this range of latitude.

== Climate and soils ==
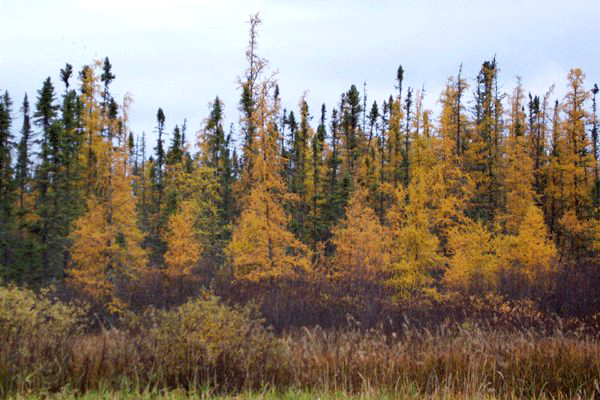
Subarctic vegetation in Canada (Larix laricina)

Subarctic temperatures are above 10 °C (50 °F) for at least one and at most three months of the year. Precipitation tends to be low due to the low moisture content of the cold air but isn't to the point to semiarid regions. Precipitation is typically greater in warmer months, with a summer maximum ranging from moderate in North America to extreme in the Russian Far East. Except in the wettest areas glaciers are not large because of the lack of winter precipitation; in the wettest areas, however, glaciers tend to be very abundant and Pleistocene glaciation covered even the lowest elevations. Soils of the subarctic are in which leaching of nutrients takes place even in the most heavily glaciated regions. The dominant soil orders are podsols and, further north, gelisols.

Subarctic regions are often characterized by taiga forest vegetation as deciduous trees can't withstand the long winters, though where winters are relatively mild, as in northern Norway, broadleaf forest may occur—though in some cases soils remain too saturated almost throughout the year to sustain any tree growth and the dominant vegetation is a peaty herbland dominated by grasses and sedges. Typically, there are only a few species of large terrestrial mammals in the subarctic regions, the most important being elk, moose (Alces alces), bears, reindeer (Rangifer tarandus), and wolves (Canis lupus). Agriculture is mainly limited to animal husbandry as many crops can't be grown here, though in some areas barley can be grown. Canada and Siberia are very rich in minerals, notably nickel, molybdenum, cobalt, lead, zinc and uranium, whilst the Grand Banks and Sea of Okhotsk are two of the richest fisheries in the world and provide support for many small towns.

Except for those areas that are well-drained or adjacent to warm ocean currents, there is almost always continuous permafrost due to the very cold winters and short summers. This means that building in most subarctic regions is very difficult and expensive: cities are very few (Murmansk being the largest) and generally small, whilst roads are also few. Subarctic rail transport only exists in Europe (lines to Narvik and Murmansk) and the Norilsk–Dudinka line in northern Siberia, as well as the Alaska Railroad in Alaska and short sections of rail lines in Canada reaching northward into the lower subarctic. An important consequence is that transportation usually tends to be restricted to "bush" planes, helicopters and, in summer, riverboats. In areas that receive lower rainfall they tend to be covered by grasslands.

== Economy ==
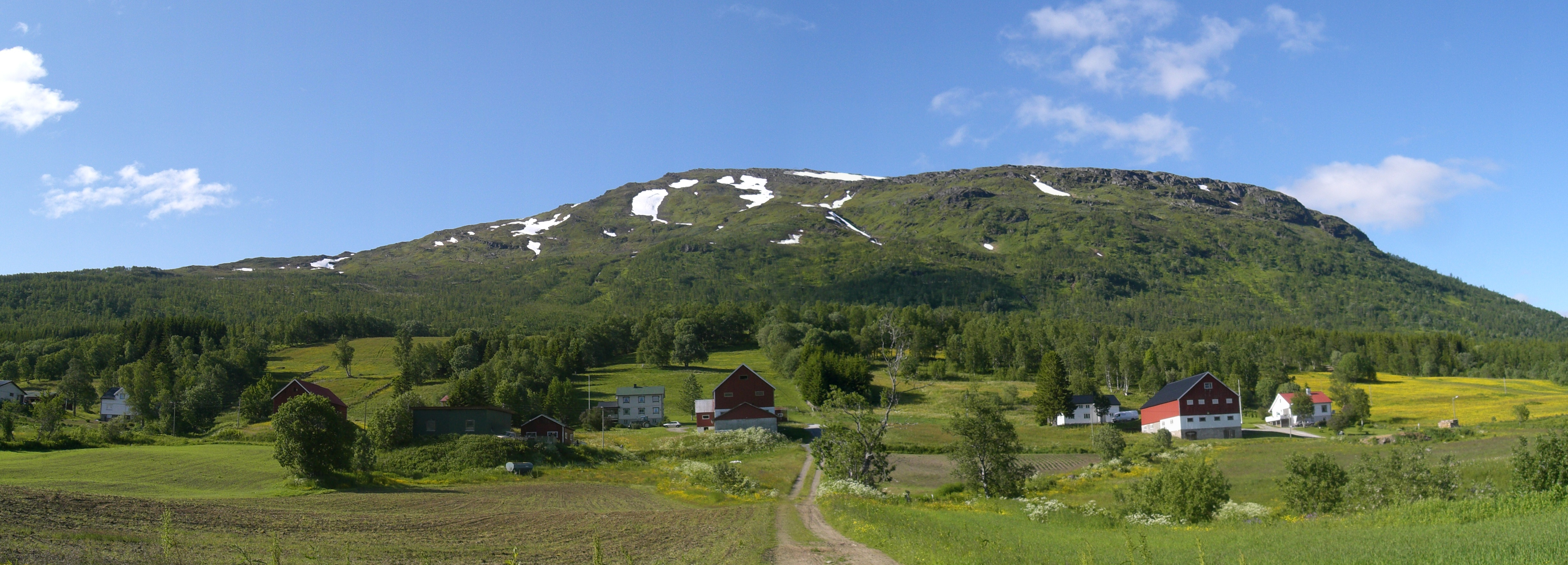
In Fennoscandia and northwestern Russia, oceanic influences soften winter temperatures; the lack of permafrost allow agriculture and infrastructure. Senja Municipality, Norway, at 69°N.

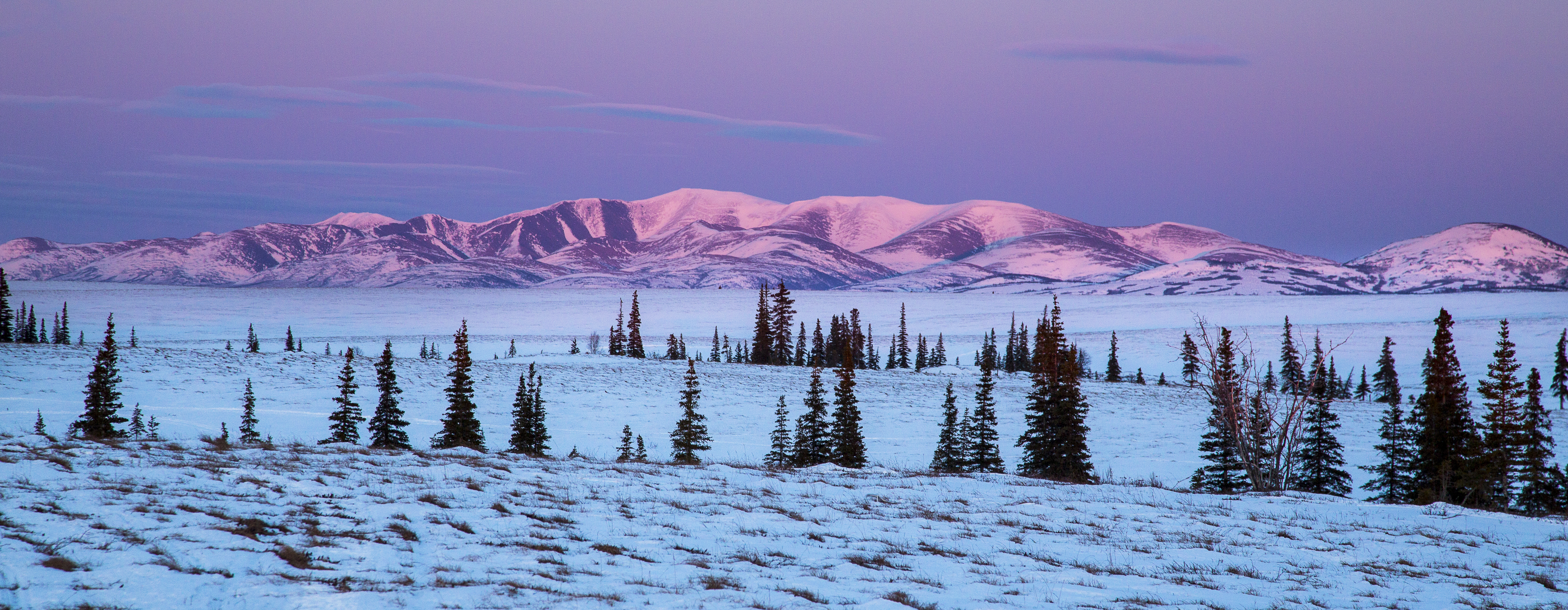
Images taken near Unalakleet show very few trees, reflecting the subarctic and polar boundaries.

Except for a few parts of Europe where the winters are relatively mild due to prevailing wind and ocean current patterns, subarctic regions were not explored until the 18th and 19th centuries. Even then, the difficulty of transportation ensured that few settlements (most of them are created for mining) lasted long—such as the abandoned, once-thriving cities of the Yukon, Northwest Territories and increasingly Siberia illustrate this.

The Trans-Siberian Railway, which skirts the edge of the region, provided a major boost to Russian settlement in the subarctic, as did the intensive industrialization under Joseph Stalin that relied on the enormous mineral resources of the Central Siberian Plateau. Today, many towns in subarctic Russia are declining precipitously as mines close. In Canada, after the early minerals ran out, development stalled until hydroelectric development occurred in the 1950s and 1960s. Hydro-Quebec in particular has carried out many engineering works in regions of near-continuous permafrost, but these have never supported a significant population and have only mainly served densely populated southern Quebec.

Tourism in recent years has become a major source of revenue for most countries of the subarctic due to the beautiful, generally glacial landscapes so characteristic of the region. Most areas in the subarctic are among the most expensive places in the world to visit, due to both high costs of living and transportation inaccessibility. Nonetheless, the great opportunities for outdoor recreation lure an ever-increasing number of travelers. At the same time, the older industries of the subarctic (fishing, mining, hydroelectric power) are being threatened by both environmental opposition and overfishing leading to depleted stocks of commercially important species living in this region.

== See also ==
- Indigenous peoples of the Subarctic
- Muskeg
- Nordicity
- Northern Canada
- Subarctic climate
