= 2019 mass invasion of Russian polar bears =

Event in which a large number of polar bears entered Arkhangelsk

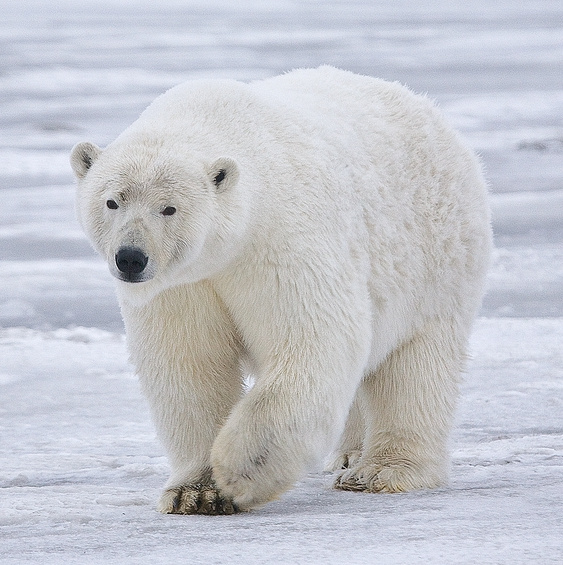
- The polar bear is a hypercarnivorous bear whose native range lies largely within the Arctic Circle
- Date: 1 February 2019
- Location: Arctic Circle

In February 2019, the Russian archipelago of Novaya Zemlya in the Arctic Ocean experienced a mass invasion of polar bears. Dozens of polar bears were seen trying to enter homes, civic buildings, and inhabited areas. The Arkhangelsk Oblast authorities declared a state of emergency on 16 February 2019.

According to the local report agency, at least 52 bears entered the area near Belushya Guba, the main settlement on the island. Footage shows the polar bears looking for food in the rubbish at a local dump. Polar bears cannot subsist on a garbage-based diet because of a lack of enough protein and fat.

Local administrator Alexander Minayev said at least between 6 and 10 bears came into the settlement's territory. People were frightened and did not want to leave their homes, so their planned daily routines were stopped. "Parents are afraid to let the children go to school or kindergarten," Minayev said. He also said that the bears "literally chased people in the region". Zhigansha Musin, the head of the local administration, said, "There have never been so many polar bears in this area since 1983".

Hunting polar bears and shooting them has been prohibited by law in Russia, and vehicle patrols and dogs were not successful in deterring them. A team of experts was dispatched to the Arctic region to remove polar bears coming into the inhabited area and its vicinity.

== Climate change effects ==
Russia's World Wildlife Fund said "Today, polar bears are entering human areas more frequently than in the past and climate change is the reason. Global warming is reducing sea-ice and this phenomenon forces polar bears to come to land in order to find new sources of food". Liz Greengrass, a director at the UK animal conservation charity Born Free Foundation told CNN that seals are the most popular food for polar bears, but global warming is shrinking their environment, so polar bears must change their food regime.

According to a 2013 study in the journal Nature, global warming is increasingly affecting the planet more than in the past. Model suggestions say that Arctic sea ice is declining at a rate of 13 percent per decade. Scientists believed this climate change is the main reason for the aggressive behavior of the polar bears.

== Aftermath ==
The local authorities have taken a number of safety measures, such as hunting down designated problem bears, securing a local school with fencing and sending military personnel to their posts by "special vehicles."
