= Nansen Basin =

Abyssal plain in the Arctic Ocean

Coordinates: 86°N 70°E

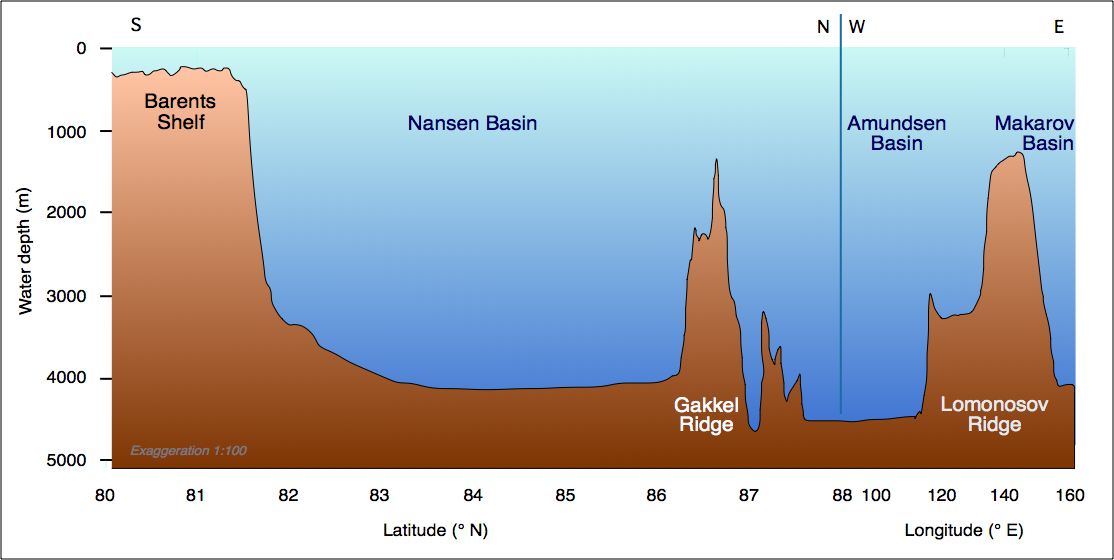
Profile of the Arctic Ocean from the Barents Sea towards the (geographic) North Pole

The Nansen Basin (also Central Basin, formerly Fram Basin) is an abyssal plain with water-depths of around 3 km in the Arctic Ocean and (together with the deeper Amundsen Basin) part of the Eurasian Basin. It is named after Fridtjof Nansen. The Nansen Basin is bounded by the Gakkel Ridge on the one side and by the Barents Sea continental shelf on the other.

The lowest point of the Arctic Ocean lies within the Nansen Basin and has a depth of 4,665 m. The Barents Abyssal Plain is located at the center of the Fram Basin.

== Oceanographic situation ==
The Russian-American cooperation Nansen and Amundsen Basin Observational System (NABOS) aims "to provide a quantitative observationally based assessment of circulation, water mass transformations, and transformation mechanisms in the Eurasian and Canadian Basins of the Arctic Ocean".

== See also ==
- Fram Strait
