= Canada Basin =

Deep oceanic basin within the Arctic Ocean

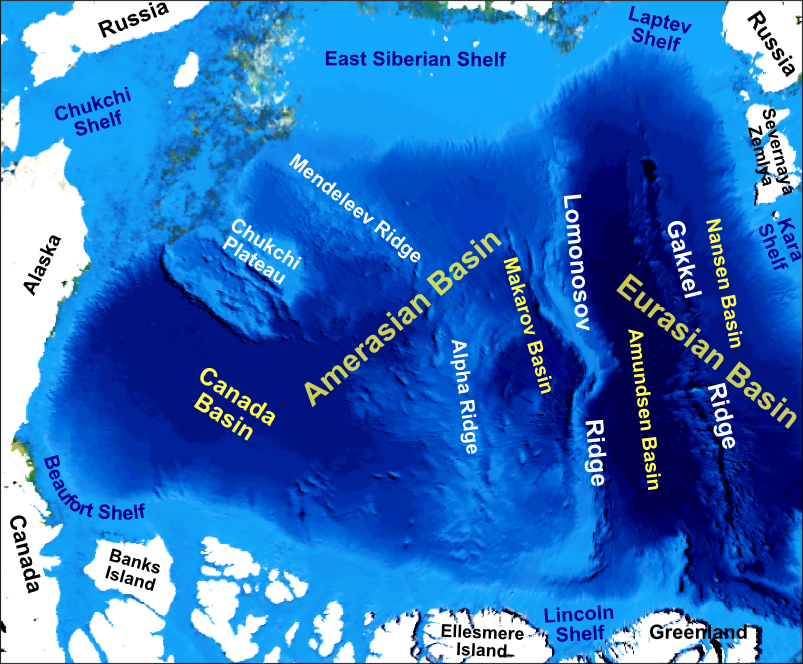
Map of bathymetric features in the Arctic Ocean, showing the location of the Canada Basin

The Canada Basin is a deep oceanic basin within the Arctic Ocean. It is part of the Amerasian Basin and lies off the coast of Alaska and northwest Canada between the Chukchi Plateau north of Alaska and the Alpha Ridge north of Ellesmere Island.
