= Eurasian Basin =

Coordinates: 83°N 50°W

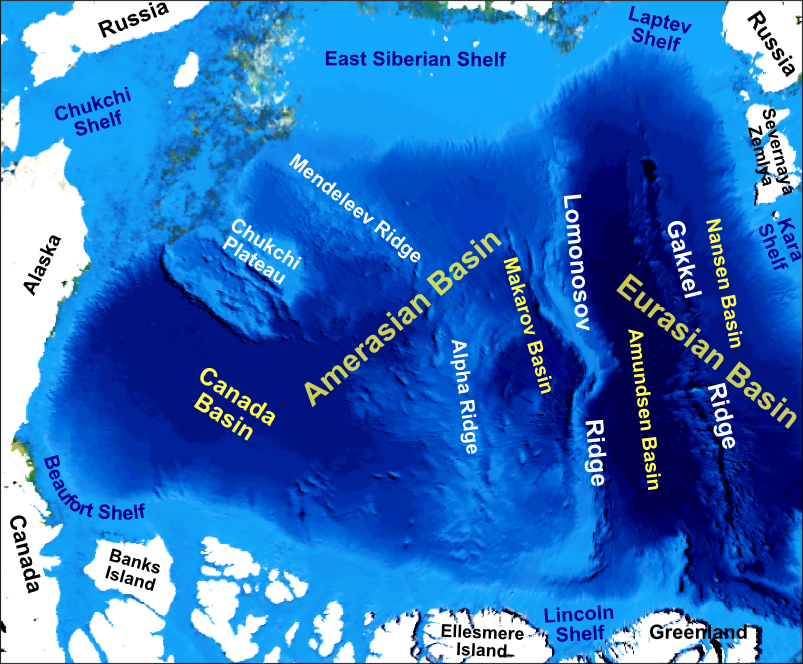
Main bathymetric features of the Arctic Ocean

The Eurasian Basin, or Eurasia Basin, is one of the two major basins into which the Arctic Basin of the Arctic Ocean is split by the Lomonosov Ridge (other being the Amerasia Basin). The Eurasia Basin may be seen as an extension of the North Atlantic Basin through Fram Strait. It is further split by the mid-ocean Gakkel Ridge into the Nansen Basin and the Amundsen Basin. The latter basin is the deepest one of the Arctic Ocean and the geographic North Pole is located there.

The Eurasian Basin is bounded by Greenland, the Lomonosov Ridge, and the shelves of the Laptev Sea, Kara Sea and Barents Sea. The maximum depth within the Eurasian Basin is reached at the Litke Deep with 5449 m depth.

Today, the Gakkel Ridge is the site of some of the slowest seafloor spreading on the Earth, with 10 mm/yr near the Fram Strait and 6 mm/yr near the Laptev Sea. Initial opening of the Eurasian Basin is constrained by magnetic anomaly and geologic information to the Cenozoic: it was first created about 53 Million years ago by the spreading of the sea floor.
