= Amerasia Basin =

Basin

Coordinates: 81°N 160°E

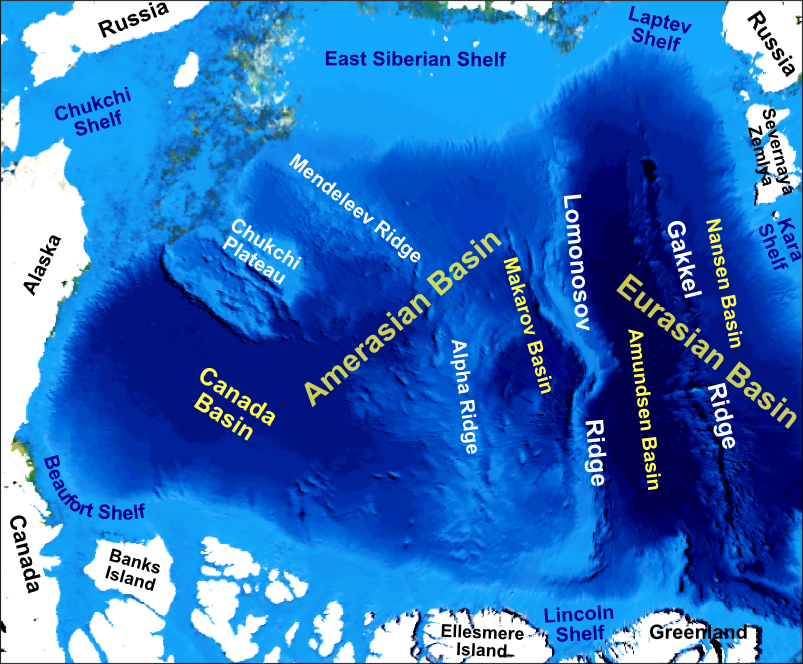
Main bathymetric/topographic features of the Arctic Ocean

The Amerasia Basin, or Amerasian Basin, is one of the two major basins from which the Arctic Ocean can be subdivided (the other one being the Eurasian Basin). The triangular-shaped Amerasia Basin broadly extends from the Canadian Arctic Islands to the East Siberian Sea, and from Alaska to the Lomonosov Ridge. The basin can be further subdivided based on bathymetric features; these include the Canada Basin, the Makarov Basin, the Podvodnikov Basin, the Alpha-Mendeleev Ridge, and the Chukchi Plateau.

The Amerasia Basin is connected to the Pacific Ocean via the Bering Strait and to the North Atlantic Ocean via the Eurasia Basin and the Fram Strait. The continental shelf around the Amerasia Basin is very broad, averaging up to 342 mi (550 km) in width. The average depth of the Amerasia Basin is 12,960 ft (3,950 m), and it covers 2,500,000 km^{2} (970,000 sq mi).

The Canada Basin (with a maximum depth of 4,000 m (13,000 ft)) is underlain by oceanic crust at its centre, as well as extended continental crust and transitional-type crust around its margins. The Makarov and Podvodnikov basins, may include oceanic crust, though have also been suggested to be highly extended continental crust or intruded by volcanics. The Alpha and Mendeleev ridges (also collectively referred to as the Alpha-Mendeleev Ridge) are considered to be predominantly volcanic in origin, possibly with a component of extended continental crust underneath. The Chukchi Plateau is made of continental crust.

Many scenarios have been proposed for the opening of the Amerasia Basin. The most popular, the "windshield wiper" model, proposes that the Arctic Alaska-Chukotka terrane (AAC) was rotated in a counter-clockwise motion, away from the Canadian Arctic Islands during the Late Jurassic–Cretaceous in one or several stages. Its opening was at the expense of an extinct ocean called the South Anuyi Ocean. It is possible that the windshield model can explain the opening of the Canada Basin, but that a more complex pattern of events is required to explain the structure of the Amerasia Basin as a whole.

The Alpha–Mendeleev Ridge forms part of the Cretaceous High Arctic Large Igneous Province (HALIP) which includes volcanic features offshore and onshore around the Arctic. An associated Early Cretaceous dyke swarm covering at least 350 km × 800 km (220 mi × 500 mi) has also been discovered. HALIP formation is related to the arrival of a mantle plume, possibly centered on the southern end of the Alpha Ridge. The plume arrival may have resulted in a regional plate reorganization event, including the opening of the Amerasia Basin and the rotation of the AAC.
