= Gakkel Ridge =

Mid-oceanic ridge under the Arctic Ocean

Coordinates: 84°N 1°W

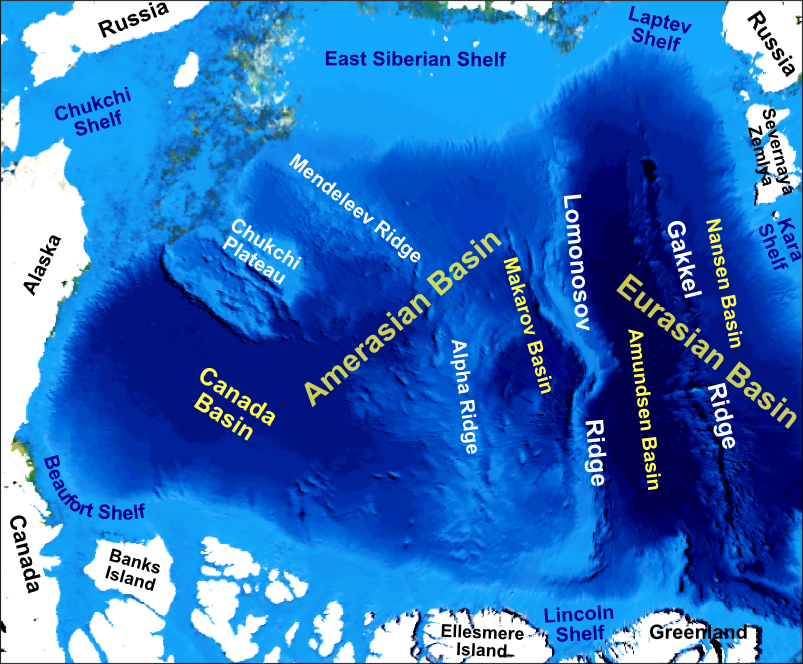
Main bathymetric or topographic features of the Arctic Ocean

The Gakkel Ridge (formerly known as the Nansen Cordillera and Arctic Mid-Ocean Ridge) is a mid-oceanic ridge, a divergent tectonic plate boundary between the North American Plate and the Eurasian Plate. It is located in the Eurasian Basin of the Arctic Ocean, between Greenland and Siberia. Geologically, it connects the northern end of the Mid-Atlantic Ridge with the Laptev Sea Rift.

== History ==
The existence and approximate location of the Gakkel Ridge were predicted by Soviet polar explorer Yakov Yakovlevich Gakkel and confirmed on Soviet expeditions in the Arctic around 1950. The Ridge is named after him, and the name was recognized in April 1987 by SCUFN (under that body's old name, the Sub-Committee on Geographical Names and Nomenclature of Ocean Bottom Features).

Until 1999, it was believed to be non-volcanic; that year, scientists operating from a nuclear submarine discovered active volcanoes along it. The largest, the Gakkel Ridge Caldera, is a supervolcano that erupted approximately 1.1 million years ago during the Pleistocene. In 2001 two research icebreakers, the German Polarstern and the American Healy, with several groups of scientists, cruised to the Gakkel Ridge to explore it and collect petrological samples. Among other discoveries, this expedition found evidence of hydrothermal vents. In 2007, Woods Hole Oceanographic Institution conducted the "Arctic Gakkel Vents Expedition" (AGAVE), which made some unanticipated discoveries, including the unconsolidated fragmented pyroclastic volcanic deposits that cover the axial valley of the ridge (whose area is greater than 10 km^{2}). These suggest volatile substances in concentrations ten times those in the magmas of normal mid-ocean ridges. Using "free-swimming" robotic submersibles on the Gakkel ridge, the AGAVE expedition also discovered what they called "bizarre 'mats' of microbial communities containing a half dozen or more new species". A hydrothermal site, named "Aurora", was discovered in 2014. Aurora has elevated levels of methane and high temperatures, suggesting interactions between water and ultramafic rock below the vent field (rather than basalt reactions). Aurora's geochemistry may resemble that of the Rainbow Vent Field in the Atlantic Ocean.

== Geology ==
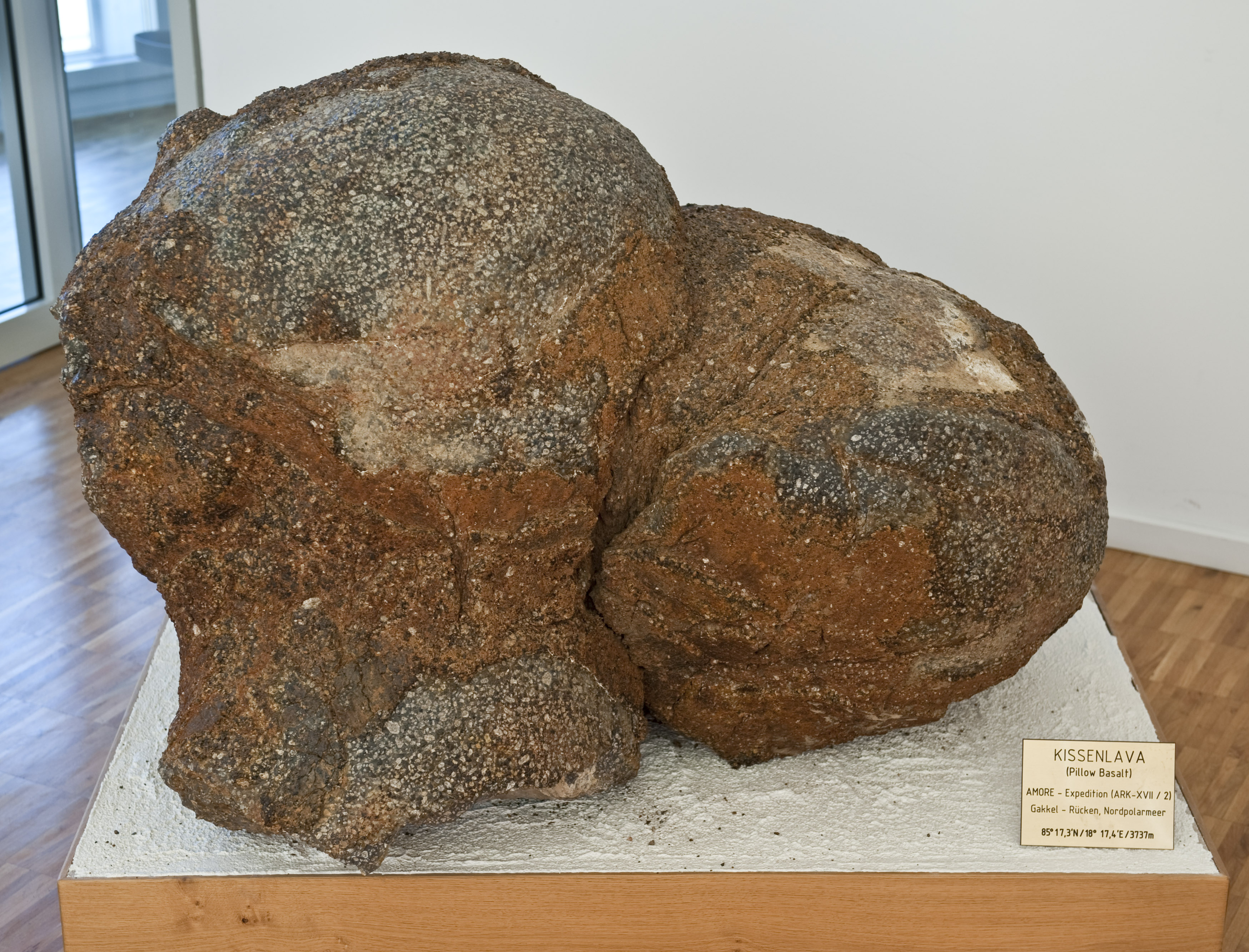
Pillow lava from the Gakkel Ridge

The Gakkel Ridge is approximately 1,800 kilometres (1,100 mi) long and is the slowest known spreading ridge on earth, with a rate of less than one centimeter per year. It continues to the south and connects with the Knipovich Ridge.

The Gakkel ridge is not offset by any transform faults. The ridge does have segments with variable orientation and varying degrees of volcanism: the Western Volcanic Zone (from the Lena trough, 7° W, to 3° E longitude), the Sparsely Magmatic Zone (from 3° E to 29° E longitude), and the Eastern Magmatic Zone (from 29° E to 89°E). The gaps of volcanic activity imply very cold crust and mantle, probably related to the very low spreading rate, but it is not yet known why some parts of the ridge are more magmatic than others. Some earthquakes have been detected from the mantle, below the crust, which is very unusual for a mid-ocean ridge. It confirms that the mantle and crust of Gakkel ridge, like some segments of the Southwest Indian Ridge, are very cold.

=== Hydrothermal Activity ===
The Gakkel ridge features several confirmed and inferred hydrothermal fields, including Aurora (visually confirmed in 2014) and Lucky B (dredged in 2001). More sites have been inferred, but not confirmed due to difficulties with ice at higher latitudes.

== See also ==
- Balagan-Tas
- Lomonosov Ridge
