= Arctic Ocean =

Oceanic division

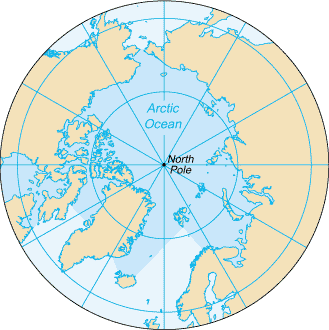
The Arctic Ocean, with borders as delineated by the International Hydrographic Organization (IHO), including Hudson Bay (some of which is south of 57°N latitude, off the map) and all other marginal seas.

The Arctic Ocean is the smallest and shallowest of the world's five oceanic divisions. It spans an area of approximately 14,060,000 km^{2} (5,430,000 sq mi) and is the coldest of the world's oceans. The International Hydrographic Organization (IHO) recognizes it as an ocean, although some oceanographers call it the Arctic Mediterranean Sea or North Polar Sea. It has also been described as being approximately equivalent to an estuary of the Atlantic Ocean. It is also seen as the northernmost part of the all-encompassing world ocean.

The Arctic Ocean includes the North Pole region in the middle of the Northern Hemisphere and extends south to about 60°N. The Arctic Ocean is surrounded by Eurasia and North America, and the borders follow topographic features: the Bering Strait on the Pacific side and the Greenland Scotland Ridge on the Atlantic side. It is partially covered by sea ice throughout the year and almost completely in winter. The Arctic Ocean's surface temperature and salinity vary seasonally as the ice cover melts and freezes; its salinity is the lowest on average of the five major oceans, due to low evaporation, heavy fresh water inflow from rivers and streams, and limited connection and outflow to surrounding oceanic waters with higher salinities. The summer shrinking of the ice has been quoted at 50%. The US National Snow and Ice Data Center (NSIDC) uses satellite data to provide a daily record of Arctic sea ice cover and the rate of melting compared to an average period and specific past years, showing a continuous decline in sea ice extent. In September 2012, the Arctic ice extent reached a new record minimum. Compared to the average extent (1979–2000), the sea ice had diminished by 49%.

== History ==
=== North America ===
Human habitation within the North American polar region goes back at least 17,000–50,000 years, during the Wisconsin glaciation. Falling sea levels allowed people to move across the Bering land bridge that joined Siberia to northwestern North America (Alaska), leading to the Settlement of the Americas.

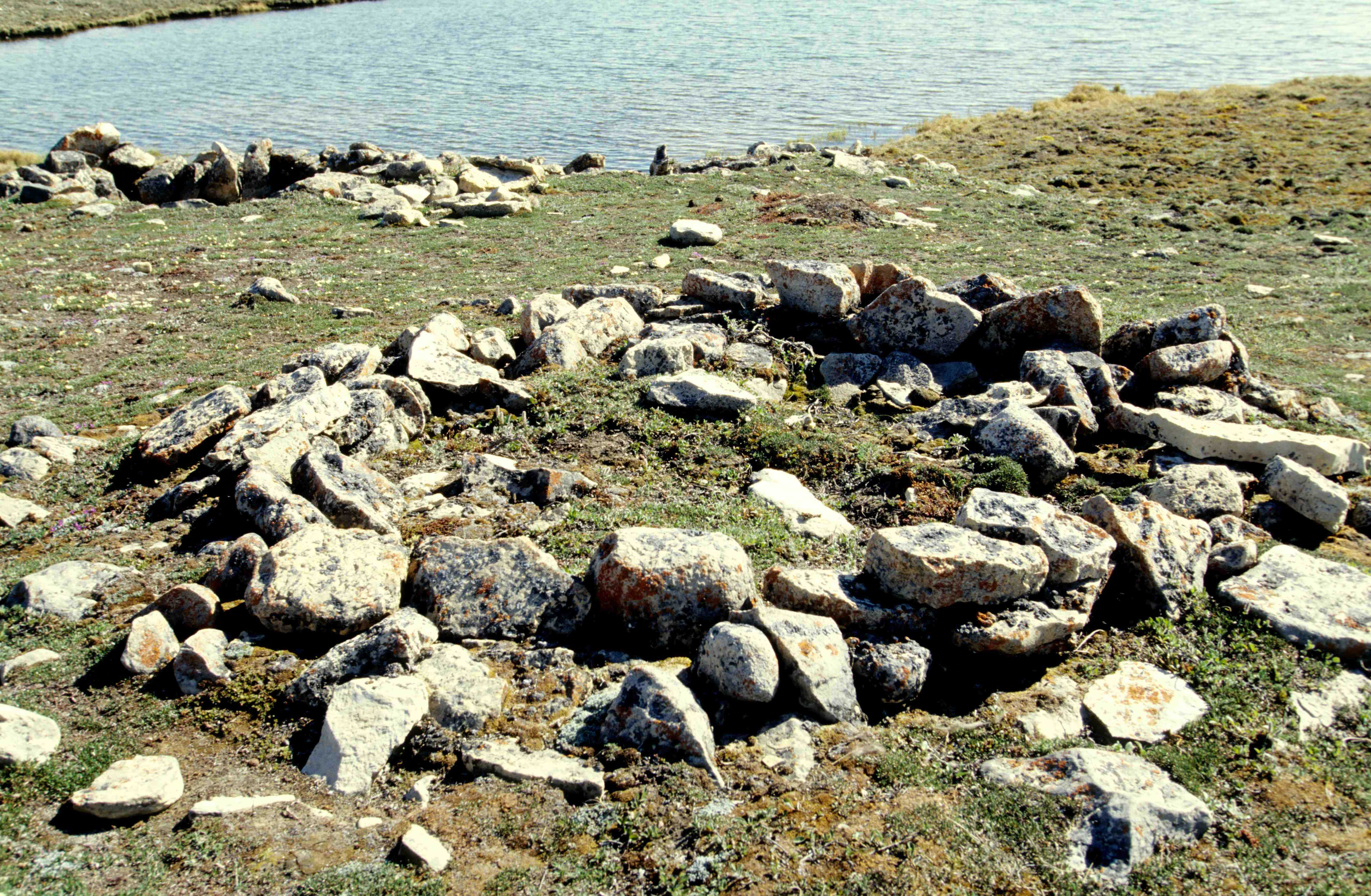
Thule archaeological site

Early Paleo-Eskimo groups included the Pre-Dorset (c. 3200–850 BC); the Saqqaq culture of Greenland (2500–800 BC); the Independence I and Independence II cultures of northeastern Canada and Greenland (c. 2400–1800 BC and c. 800–1 BC); and the Groswater of Labrador and Nunavik. The Dorset culture spread across Arctic North America between 500 BC and AD 1500. The Dorset were the last major Paleo-Eskimo culture in the Arctic before the migration east from present-day Alaska of the Thule people, ancestors of the modern Inuit.

The Thule Tradition lasted from about 200 BC to AD 1600, arising around the Bering Strait and later encompassing almost the entire Arctic region of North America. The Thule people were the ancestors of the Inuit, who now live in Alaska, Northwest Territories, Nunavut, Nunavik (northern Quebec), Labrador and Greenland.

=== Europe ===
For much of European history, the north polar regions remained largely unexplored and their geography conjectural. Pytheas of Massilia recorded an account of a journey northward in 325 BC, to a land he called "Eschate Thule", where the Sun only set for three hours each day and the water was replaced by a congealed substance "on which one can neither walk nor sail". He was probably describing loose sea ice known today as "growlers" or "bergy bits"; his "Thule" was probably Norway, though the Faroe Islands or Shetland have also been suggested.

Emanuel Bowen's 1780s map of the Arctic features a "Northern Ocean".

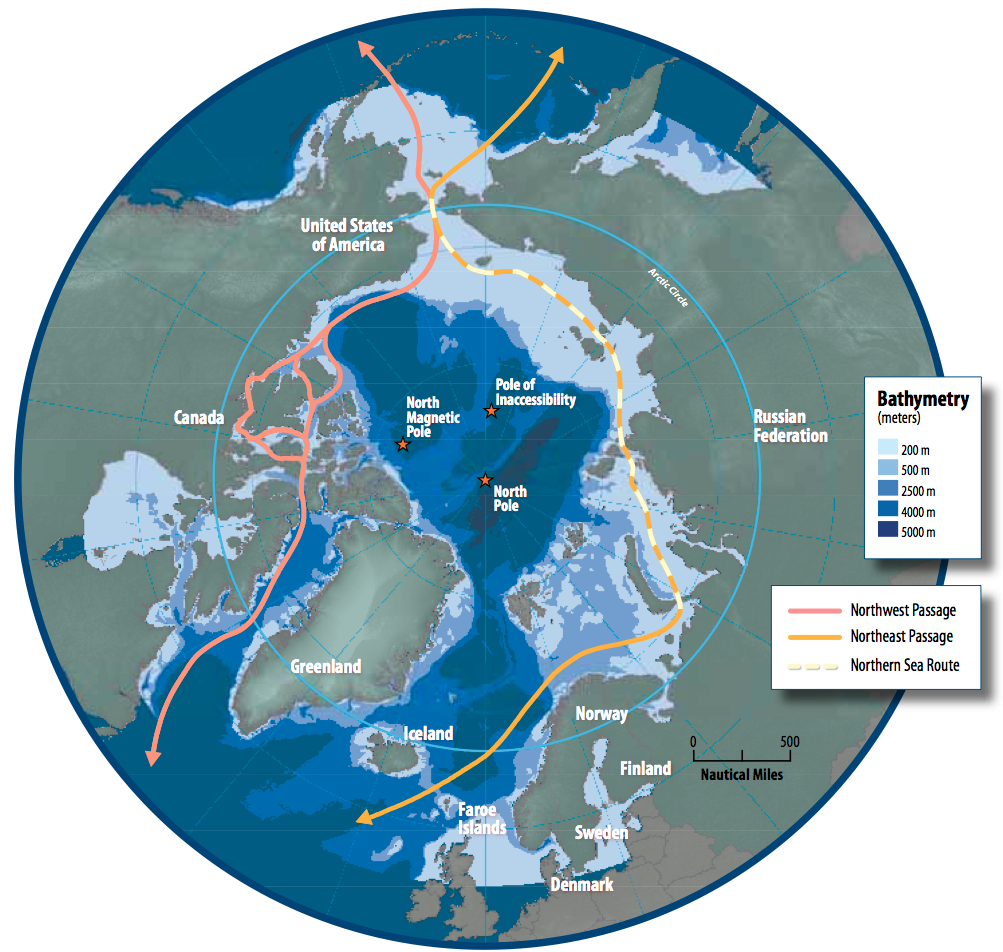
The Arctic region showing the Northeast Passage, the Northern Sea Route within it, and the Northwest Passage via Canadian Inland Waters.

Due to the limited information available at the time, early cartographers were unsure how to represent the regions around the North Pole, with some including regions of land (as in Johannes Ruysch's map of 1507, or Gerardus Mercator's map of 1595) or representing the entire region as water (as with Martin Waldseemüller's world map of 1507). The few expeditions to penetrate much beyond the Arctic Circle in that era added only small islands, such as Novaya Zemlya (11th century) and Spitzbergen (1596). From the late 16th to the early 20th century, expeditions to the Arctic Ocean became more common (see List of Arctic expeditions), often in search of trade routes from Europe to the Pacific Ocean, and so the geographical knowledge of the region gradually improved.

=== 19th century ===
The lack of knowledge of what lay north of the shifting barrier of ice gave rise to a number of conjectures. In England and other European nations, the myth of an "Open Polar Sea" was persistent. John Barrow, longtime Second Secretary of the British Admiralty, promoted exploration of the region from 1818 to 1845 in search of this.

In the United States in the 1850s and 1860s, the explorers Elisha Kane and Isaac Israel Hayes both claimed to have seen part of this elusive body of water. Even quite late in the century, the eminent authority Matthew Fontaine Maury included a description of the Open Polar Sea in his textbook The Physical Geography of the Sea (1883). Nevertheless, as all the explorers who travelled closer and closer to the pole reported, the polar ice cap is quite thick and persists year-round, and the open polar sea theory was widely considered to be disproven by the early 1900s.

Fridtjof Nansen was the first to make a nautical crossing of the Arctic Ocean, in the Fram Expedition from 1893 to 1896.

=== 20th century ===
The first surface crossing of the ocean was led by Wally Herbert in 1969, in a dog sled expedition from Alaska to Svalbard, with air support. The first nautical transit of the north pole was made in 1958 by the submarine USS Nautilus, and the first surface nautical transit occurred in 1977 by the icebreaker NS Arktika.

Since 1937, Soviet and Russian manned drifting ice stations have extensively monitored the Arctic Ocean. Scientific settlements were established on the drift ice and carried thousands of kilometres by ice floes.

In World War II, the European region of the Arctic Ocean was heavily contested: the Allied commitment to resupply the Soviet Union via its northern ports was opposed by German naval and air forces. In 1954 Scandinavian Airlines (SAS) established the first commercial flights over the Arctic Ocean, between Los Angeles and Copenhagen.

=== 21st century ===
In August 2019, US President Donald Trump publicly proposed the purchase of Greenland. He raised the idea firmly in December 2024, saying ownership of Greenland was necessary for the national security and economic interests of the United States. He has said the use of force is not ruled out. In a 10 December 2024, social media post, President-elect Trump referred to the prime minister of Canada as the governor of a purported 51st state. Previously he had said that annexation of Canada might be preferable from a trade point of view. On 1 February 2025, he began a trade war.

During a telephone call with new Canadian Prime Minister Mark Carney on 28 March 2025, Trump raised the idea of Canada becoming the 51st U.S. state and described his view of the advantages of annexation. In various other comments, formal and informal, he has expressed a desire to control Canada's resources and the Canadian Internal Waters of the Arctic, commonly known as the Northwest Passage.

== Geography ==
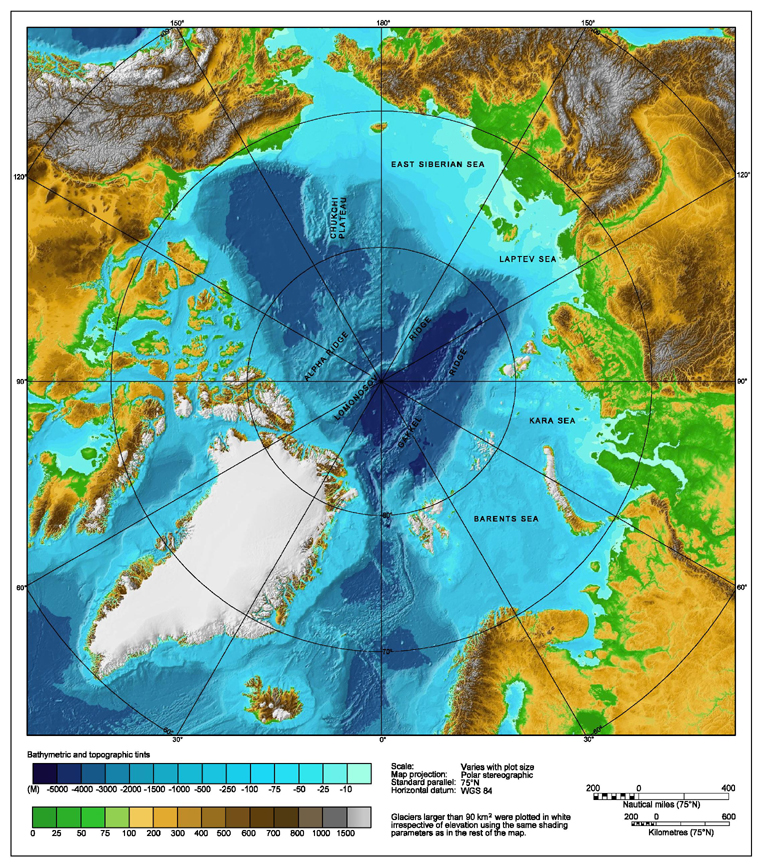
A bathymetric/topographic map of the Arctic Ocean and the surrounding lands.

The Arctic region; of note, the region's southerly border on this map is depicted by a red isotherm, with all territory to the north having an average temperature of less than 10 °C (50 °F) in July.

=== Size ===
The Arctic Ocean occupies a roughly circular basin and covers an area of about 14,056,000 km^{2} (5,427,000 sq mi), almost the size of Antarctica. The coastline is 45,390 km (28,200 mi) long. It is the only ocean smaller than Russia, which has a land area of 17,098,246 km^{2} (6,601,670 sq mi).

=== Surrounding land and exclusive economic zones ===
The Arctic Ocean is surrounded by the land masses of Eurasia (Russia and Norway), North America (Canada and the U.S. state of Alaska), Greenland, and Iceland.

Arctic exclusive economic zones
Country segment	Area	
Country segment	km^{2}	sq mi
Laptev Sea to Chukchi Sea, Russia	2,088,075	806,210
Kara Sea, Russia	1,058,129	408,546
Barents Sea, Russia	1,199,008	462,940
Mainland Norway	935,397	361,159
Svalbard Island, Norway	804,907	310,776
Jan Mayen Island, Norway	292,189	112,815
Mainland Iceland	756,112	291,936
Mainland Greenland, Denmark	2,278,113	879,584
East Coast	2,276,594	878,998
Arctic Canada	3,021,355	1,166,552
Arctic United States	508,814	196,454
Other	1,500,000	580,000
Arctic Ocean total	14,056,000	5,427,000

Note: Some parts of the areas listed in the table are located in the Atlantic Ocean. Other consists of Gulfs, Straits, Channels and other parts without specific names and excludes Exclusive Economic Zones.

=== Subareas and connections ===
The Arctic Ocean is connected to the Pacific Ocean by the Bering Strait and to the Atlantic Ocean through the Greenland Sea and Labrador Sea. (The Iceland Sea is sometimes considered part of the Greenland Sea, and sometimes separate.)

The largest seas in the Arctic Ocean:

1. Barents Sea—1.4 million km^{2} (540,000 sq mi)
2. Hudson Bay—1.23 million km^{2} (470,000 sq mi) (sometimes not included)
3. Greenland Sea—1.205 million km^{2} (465,000 sq mi)
4. East Siberian Sea—987,000 km^{2} (381,000 sq mi)
5. Kara Sea—926,000 km^{2} (358,000 sq mi)
6. Laptev Sea—662,000 km^{2} (256,000 sq mi)
7. Chukchi Sea—620,000 km^{2} (240,000 sq mi)
8. Beaufort Sea—476,000 km^{2} (184,000 sq mi)
9. Amundsen Gulf—93,000 km^{2} (36,000 sq mi)
10. White Sea—90,000 km^{2} (35,000 sq mi)
11. Pechora Sea—81,263 km^{2} (31,376 sq mi)
12. Lincoln Sea—64,000 km^{2} (25,000 sq mi)
13. Prince Gustaf Adolf Sea
14. Queen Victoria Sea
15. Wandel Sea

Different authorities put various marginal seas in either the Arctic Ocean or the Atlantic Ocean, including: Hudson Bay, Baffin Bay, the Norwegian Sea, and Hudson Strait.

=== Islands ===
The main islands and archipelagos in the Arctic Ocean are, from the prime meridian west:

- Jan Mayen (Norway)
- Iceland
- Greenland (Denmark)
- Arctic Archipelago (Canada, includes the Queen Elizabeth Islands and Baffin Island)
- Wrangel Island (Russia)
- New Siberian Islands (Russia)
- Severnaya Zemlya (Russia)
- Novaya Zemlya (Russia, includes Severny Island and Yuzhny Island)
- Franz Josef Land (Russia)
- Svalbard (Norway, including Bear Island)

=== Ports ===
There are several ports and harbours on the Arctic Ocean.

- Alaska
  - Utqiaġvik (Barrow)
  - Prudhoe Bay
- Canada
  - Manitoba: Churchill (Port of Churchill)
  - Nunavut: Nanisivik (Nanisivik Naval Facility)
  - Tuktoyaktuk and Inuvik in the Northwest Territories
- Greenland (Denmark): Nuuk (Nuuk Port and Harbour)
- Norway
  - Mainland: Kirkenes and Vardø
  - Svalbard: Longyearbyen
- Iceland
  - Akureyri
- Russia
  - Barents Sea: Murmansk
  - White Sea: Arkhangelsk
  - Kara Sea: Labytnangi, Salekhard, Dudinka, Igarka and Dikson
  - Laptev Sea: Tiksi
  - East Siberian Sea: Pevek

=== Arctic shelves ===
The ocean's Arctic shelf comprises a number of continental shelves, including the Canadian Arctic shelf and the Russian continental shelf, which is sometimes called the "Arctic Shelf" because it is larger. The Russian continental shelf consists of three separate, smaller shelves: the Barents Shelf, Chukchi Sea Shelf and Siberian Shelf. Of these three, the Siberian Shelf is the largest such shelf in the world; it holds large oil and gas reserves. The edge of the Chukchi shelf forms the border between Russian and the United States as defined by the Baker–Shevardnadze line in the 1990 USSR–USA Maritime Boundary Agreement. The whole area is subject to international territorial claims, as well as several territorial disputes. The Chukchi Plateau extends from the Chukchi Sea Shelf.

=== Underwater features ===
An underwater ridge, the Lomonosov Ridge, divides the deep sea North Polar Basin into two oceanic basins: the Eurasian Basin, which is 4,000–4,500 m (13,100–14,800 ft) deep, and the Amerasian Basin (sometimes called the North American or Hyperborean Basin), which is about 4,000 m (13,000 ft) deep. The bathymetry of the ocean bottom is marked by fault block ridges, abyssal plains, ocean deeps, and basins. The average depth of the Arctic Ocean is 1,038 m (3,406 ft). The deepest point is Molloy Hole in the Fram Strait, at about 5,550 m (18,210 ft).

The two major basins are further subdivided by ridges into the Canada Basin (between Beaufort Shelf of North America and the Alpha Ridge), Makarov Basin (between the Alpha and Lomonosov Ridges), Amundsen Basin (between Lomonosov and Gakkel ridges), and Nansen Basin (between the Gakkel Ridge and the continental shelf that includes the Franz Josef Land).

== Geology ==
The crystalline basement rocks of mountains around the Arctic Ocean were recrystallized or formed during the Ellesmerian orogeny, the regional phase of the larger Caledonian orogeny in the Paleozoic Era. Regional subsidence in the Jurassic and Triassic periods led to significant sediment deposition, creating many of the reservoirs for current day oil and gas deposits. During the Cretaceous period, the Canadian Basin opened, and tectonic activity due to the assembly of Alaska caused hydrocarbons to migrate toward what is now Prudhoe Bay. At the same time, sediments shed off the rising Canadian Rockies built out the large Mackenzie Delta.

The rifting apart of the supercontinent Pangea, beginning in the Triassic period, opened the early Atlantic Ocean. Rifting then extended northward, opening the Arctic Ocean as mafic oceanic crust material erupted out of a branch of Mid-Atlantic Ridge. The Amerasia Basin may have opened first, with the Chukchi Borderland moved along to the northeast by transform faults. Additional spreading helped to create the "triple-junction" of the Alpha-Mendeleev Ridge in the Late Cretaceous epoch.

Throughout the Cenozoic Era, the subduction of the Pacific plate, the collision of India with Eurasia, and the continued opening of the North Atlantic created new hydrocarbon traps. The seafloor began spreading from the Gakkel Ridge in the Paleocene Epoch and the Eocene Epoch, causing the Lomonosov Ridge to move farther from land and subside.

Because of sea ice and remote conditions, the geology of the Arctic Ocean is still poorly explored. The Arctic Coring Expedition drilling shed some light on the Lomonosov Ridge, which appears to be continental crust separated from the Barents-Kara Shelf in the Paleocene and then starved of sediment. It may contain up to 10 billion barrels of oil. The Gakkel Ridge rift is also poorly understood and may extend into the Laptev Sea.

== Oceanography ==
=== Water flow ===
Distribution of the major water mass in the Arctic Ocean. The section sketches the different water masses along a vertical section from Bering Strait over the geographic North Pole to Fram Strait. As the stratification is stable, deeper water masses are denser than the layers above.

Density structure of the upper 1,200 m (3,900 ft) in the Arctic Ocean. Profiles of temperature and salinity for the Amundsen Basin, the Canadian Basin and the Greenland Sea are sketched.

In large parts of the Arctic Ocean, the top layer (about 50 m [160 ft]) is of lower salinity and lower temperature than the rest. It remains relatively stable because the salinity effect on density is bigger than the temperature effect. It is fed by the freshwater input of the big Siberian and Canadian rivers (Ob, Yenisei, Lena, Mackenzie), the water of which quasi floats on the saltier, denser, deeper ocean water. Between this lower salinity layer and the bulk of the ocean lies the so-called halocline, in which both salinity and temperature rise with increasing depth.

Because of its relative isolation from other oceans, the Arctic Ocean has a uniquely complex system of water flow. It resembles some hydrological features of the Mediterranean Sea, referring to its deep waters having only limited communication through the Fram Strait with the Atlantic Basin, "where the circulation is dominated by thermohaline forcing". The Arctic Ocean has a total volume of 18.07 × 10^{6} km^{3}, equal to about 1.3% of the World Ocean. Mean surface circulation is predominantly cyclonic on the Eurasian side and anticyclonic in the Canadian Basin.

Water enters from both the Pacific and Atlantic Oceans and can be divided into three unique water masses. The deepest water mass is called Arctic Bottom Water and begins around 900 m (3,000 ft) depth. It is composed of the densest water in the World Ocean and has two main sources: Arctic shelf water and Greenland Sea Deep Water. Water in the shelf region that begins as inflow from the Pacific passes through the narrow Bering Strait at an average rate of 0.8 Sverdrups and reaches the Chukchi Sea. During the winter, cold Alaskan winds blow over the Chukchi Sea, freezing the surface water and pushing this newly formed ice out to the Pacific. The speed of the ice drift is roughly 1–4 cm/s. This process leaves dense, salty waters in the sea that sink over the continental shelf into the western Arctic Ocean and create a halocline. This water is met by Greenland Sea Deep Water, which forms during the passage of winter storms. As temperatures cool dramatically in the winter, ice forms, and intense vertical convection allows the water to become dense enough to sink below the warm saline water below. Arctic Bottom Water is critically important because of its outflow, which contributes to the formation of Atlantic Deep Water. The overturning of this water plays a key role in global circulation and the moderation of climate.

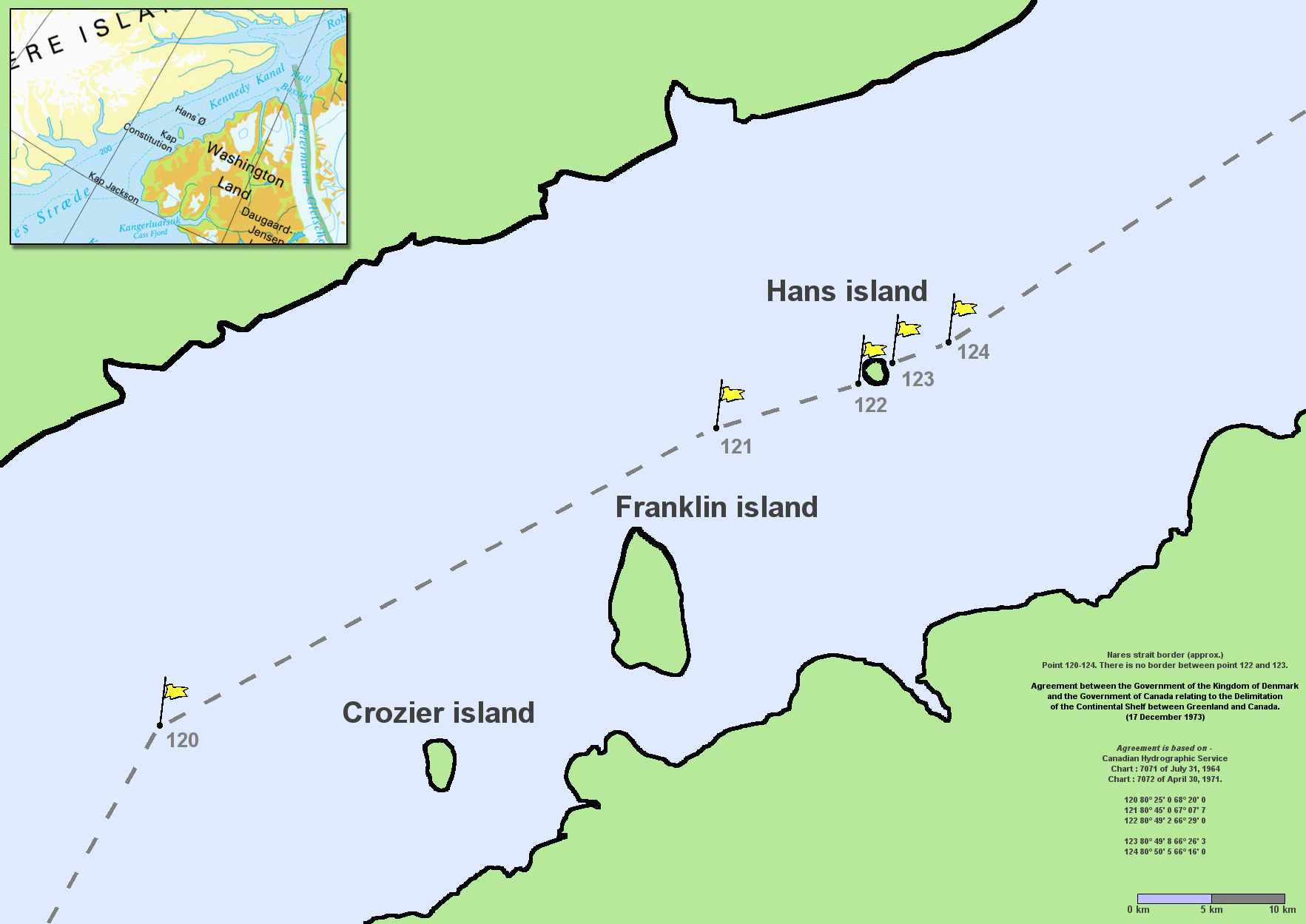
The Kennedy Channel.

In the depth range of 150–900 m (490–2,950 ft) is a water mass referred to as Atlantic Water. Inflow from the North Atlantic Current enters through the Fram Strait, cooling and sinking to form the deepest layer of the halocline, where it circles the Arctic Basin counter-clockwise. This is the highest volumetric inflow to the Arctic Ocean, equalling about 10 times that of the Pacific inflow, and it creates the Arctic Ocean Boundary Current. It flows slowly, at about 0.02 m/s. Atlantic Water has the same salinity as Arctic Bottom Water but is much warmer (up to 3 °C [37 °F]). In fact, this water mass is actually warmer than the surface water and remains submerged only due to the role of salinity in density. When water reaches the basin, it is pushed by strong winds into a large circular current called the Beaufort Gyre. Water in the Beaufort Gyre is far less saline than that of the Chukchi Sea due to inflow from large Canadian and Siberian rivers.

The final defined water mass in the Arctic Ocean is called Arctic Surface Water and is found in the depth range of 150–200 m (490–660 ft). The most important feature of this water mass is a section referred to as the sub-surface layer. It is a product of Atlantic water that enters through canyons and is subjected to intense mixing on the Siberian Shelf. As it is entrained, it cools and acts a heat shield for the surface layer on account of weak mixing between layers.

However, over the past couple of decades a combination of the warming and the shoaling of Atlantic water are leading to the increasing influence of Atlantic water heat in melting sea ice in the eastern Arctic. The most recent estimates, for 2016–2018, indicate the oceanic heat flux to the surface has now overtaken the atmospheric flux in the eastern Eurasian Basin. Over the same period the weakening halocline stratification has coincided with increasing upper ocean currents thought to be associated with declining sea ice, indicate increasing mixing in this region. In contrast direct measurements of mixing in the western Arctic indicate the Atlantic water heat remains isolated at intermediate depths even under the 'perfect storm' conditions of the Great Arctic Cyclone of 2012.

Waters originating in the Pacific and Atlantic both exit through the Fram Strait between Greenland and Svalbard Island, which is about 2,700 m (8,900 ft) deep and 350 km (220 mi) wide. This outflow is about 9 Sv. The width of the Fram Strait is what allows for both inflow and outflow on the Atlantic side of the Arctic Ocean. Because of this, it is influenced by the Coriolis force, which concentrates outflow to the East Greenland Current on the western side and inflow to the Norwegian Current on the eastern side. Pacific water also exits along the west coast of Greenland and the Hudson Strait (1–2 Sv), providing nutrients to the Canadian Archipelago.

As noted, the process of ice formation and movement is a key driver in Arctic Ocean circulation and the formation of water masses. With this dependence, the Arctic Ocean experiences variations due to seasonal changes in sea ice cover. Sea ice movement is the result of wind forcing, which is related to a number of meteorological conditions that the Arctic experiences throughout the year. For example, the Beaufort High—an extension of the Siberian High system—is a pressure system that drives the anticyclonic motion of the Beaufort Gyre. During the summer, this area of high pressure is pushed out closer to its Siberian and Canadian sides. In addition, there is a sea level pressure (SLP) ridge over Greenland that drives strong northerly winds through the Fram Strait, facilitating ice export. In the summer, the SLP contrast is smaller, producing weaker winds. A final example of seasonal pressure system movement is the low pressure system that exists over the Nordic and Barents Seas. It is an extension of the Icelandic Low, which creates cyclonic ocean circulation in this area. The low shifts to centre over the North Pole in the summer. These variations in the Arctic all contribute to ice drift reaching its weakest point during the summer months. There is also evidence that the drift is associated with the phase of the Arctic Oscillation and Atlantic Multidecadal Oscillation.

=== Sea ice ===
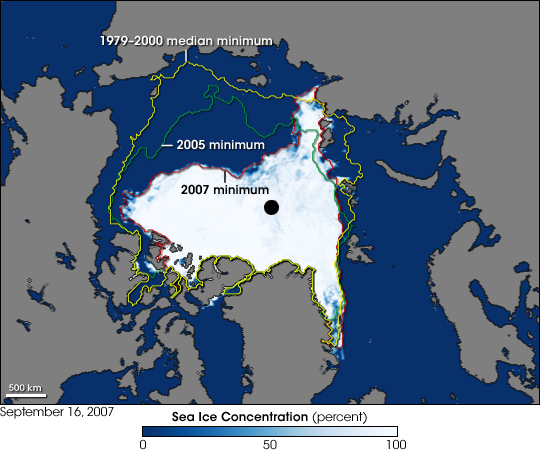
Sea cover in the Arctic Ocean, showing the median, 2005 and 2007 coverage

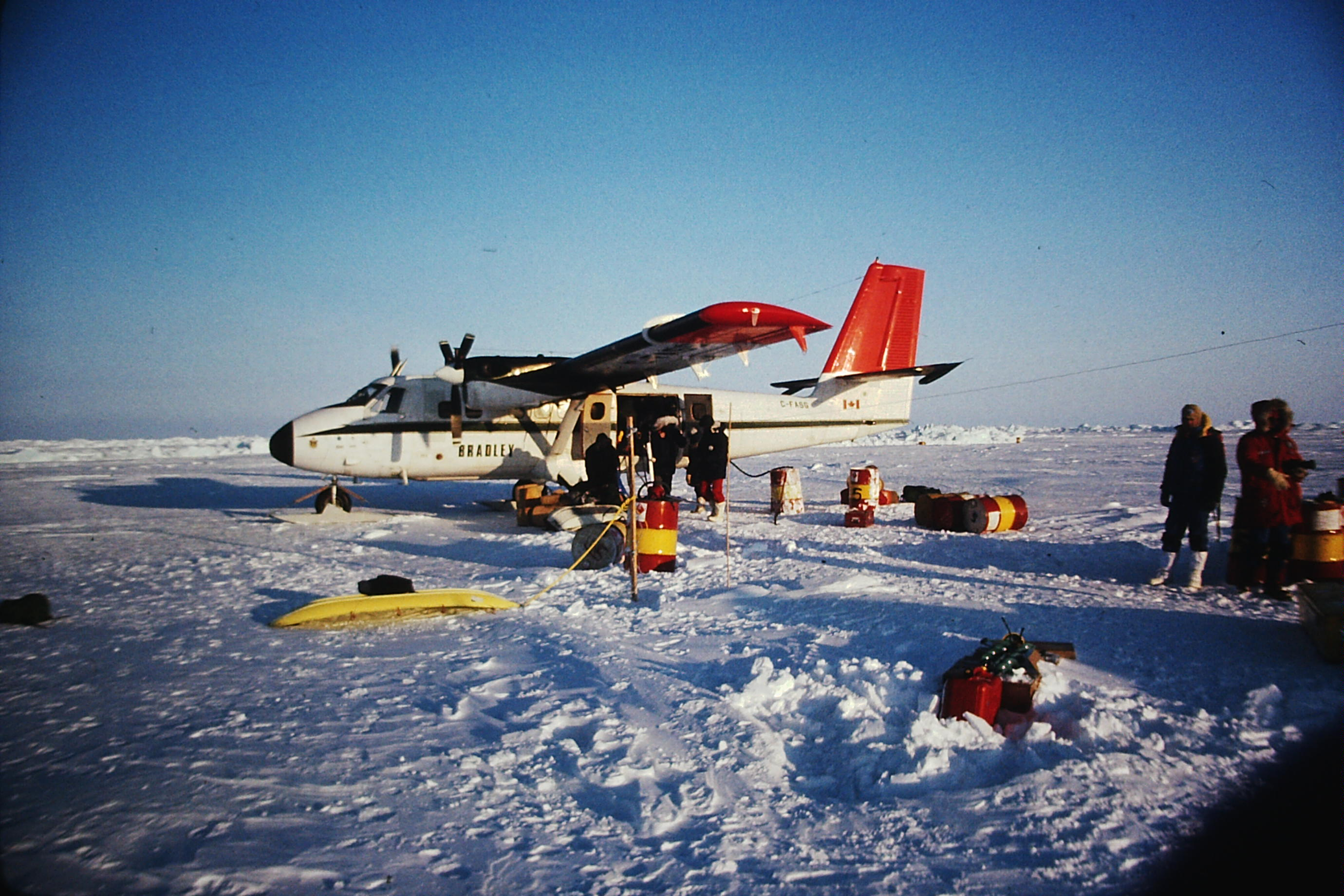
On the sea ice of the Arctic Ocean temporary logistic stations may be installed. Here, a Twin Otter is refueled on the pack ice at 86°N, 76°43'W. on April 16, 1990 during a flight to the North Pole

Much of the Arctic Ocean is covered by sea ice that varies in extent and thickness seasonally. The mean extent of the Arctic sea ice has been continuously decreasing in the last decades, declining at a rate of currently 12.85% per decade since 1980 from the average winter value of 15,600,000 km^{2} (6,023,200 mi^{2}). The seasonal variations are about 7,000,000 km^{2} (2,702,700 mi^{2}), with the maximum in April and minimum in September. The sea ice is affected by wind and ocean currents, which can move and rotate very large areas of ice. Zones of compression also arise, where the ice piles up to form pack ice.

Icebergs occasionally break away from northern Ellesmere Island, and icebergs are formed from glaciers in western Greenland and extreme northeastern Canada. Icebergs are not sea ice but may become embedded in the pack ice. Icebergs pose a hazard to ships, of which the Titanic is one of the most famous. The ocean is virtually icelocked from October to June, and the superstructure of ships are subject to icing from October to May. Before the advent of modern icebreakers, ships sailing the Arctic Ocean risked being trapped or crushed by sea ice (although the Baychimo drifted through the Arctic Ocean untended for decades despite these hazards).

== Climate ==
Changes in ice between 1990 and 1999

The Arctic Ocean is contained in a polar climate characterized by persistent cold and relatively narrow annual temperature ranges. Winters are characterized by the polar night, extreme cold, frequent low-level temperature inversions, and stable weather conditions. Cyclones are only common on the Atlantic side. Summers are characterized by continuous daylight (midnight sun), and air temperatures can rise slightly above 0 °C (32 °F). Cyclones are more frequent in summer and may bring rain or snow. It is cloudy year-round, with mean cloud cover ranging from 60% in winter to over 80% in summer.

The temperature of the surface water of the Arctic Ocean is fairly constant at approximately −1.8 °C (28.8 °F), near the freezing point of seawater.

The density of sea water, in contrast to fresh water, increases as it nears the freezing point and thus it tends to sink. It is generally necessary that the upper 100–150 m (330–490 ft) of ocean water cools to the freezing point for sea ice to form. In the winter, the relatively warm ocean water exerts a moderating influence, even when covered by ice. This is one reason why the Arctic does not experience the extreme temperatures seen on the Antarctic continent.

There is considerable seasonal variation in how much pack ice of the Arctic ice pack covers the Arctic Ocean. Much of the Arctic ice pack is also covered in snow for about 10 months of the year. The maximum snow cover is in March or April—about 20–50 cm (7.9–19.7 in) over the frozen ocean.

The climate of the Arctic region has varied significantly during the Earth's history. During the Paleocene–Eocene Thermal Maximum 55 million years ago, when the global climate underwent a warming of approximately 5–8 °C (9–14 °F), the region reached an average annual temperature of 10–20 °C (50–68 °F). The surface waters of the northernmost Arctic Ocean warmed, seasonally at least, enough to support tropical lifeforms (the dinoflagellates Apectodinium augustum) requiring surface temperatures of over 22 °C (72 °F).

Currently, the Arctic region is warming twice as fast as the rest of the planet.

== Biology ==
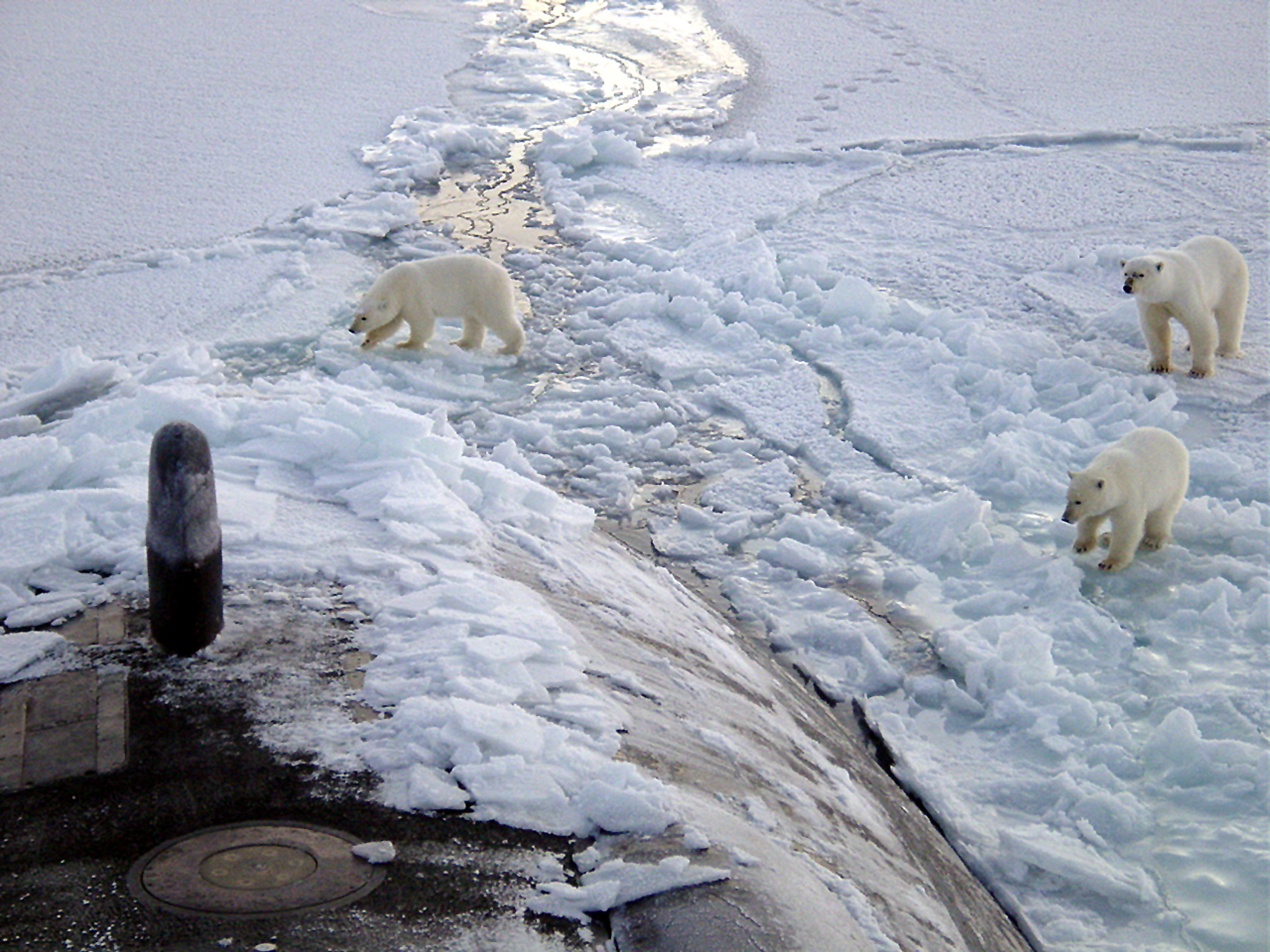
Three polar bears approach USS Honolulu near the North Pole.

Due to the pronounced seasonality of 2–6 months of midnight sun and polar night in the Arctic Ocean, the primary production of photosynthesizing organisms such as ice algae and phytoplankton is limited to the spring and summer months (March/April to September). Important consumers of primary producers in the central Arctic Ocean and the adjacent shelf seas include zooplankton, especially copepods (Calanus finmarchicus, Calanus glacialis, and Calanus hyperboreus) and euphausiids, as well as ice-associated fauna (e.g., amphipods). These primary consumers form an important link between the primary producers and higher trophic levels. The composition of higher trophic levels in the Arctic Ocean varies with region (Atlantic side vs. Pacific side) and with the sea-ice cover. Secondary consumers in the Barents Sea, an Atlantic-influenced Arctic shelf sea, are mainly sub-Arctic species including herring, young cod, and capelin. In ice-covered regions of the central Arctic Ocean, polar cod is a central predator of primary consumers. The apex predators in the Arctic Ocean—marine mammals such as seals, whales, and polar bears—prey upon fish.

Endangered marine species in the Arctic Ocean include walruses and whales. The area has a fragile ecosystem, and it is especially exposed to climate change, because it warms faster than the rest of the world. Lion's mane jellyfish are abundant in the waters of the Arctic, and the banded gunnel is the only species of gunnel that lives in the ocean.

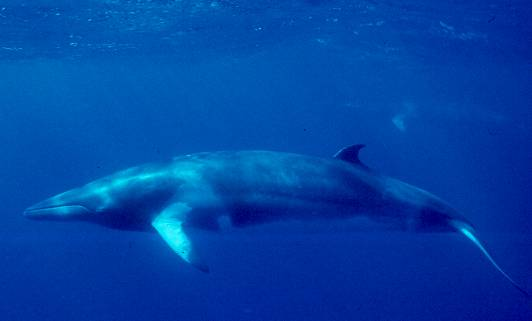
Minke whale

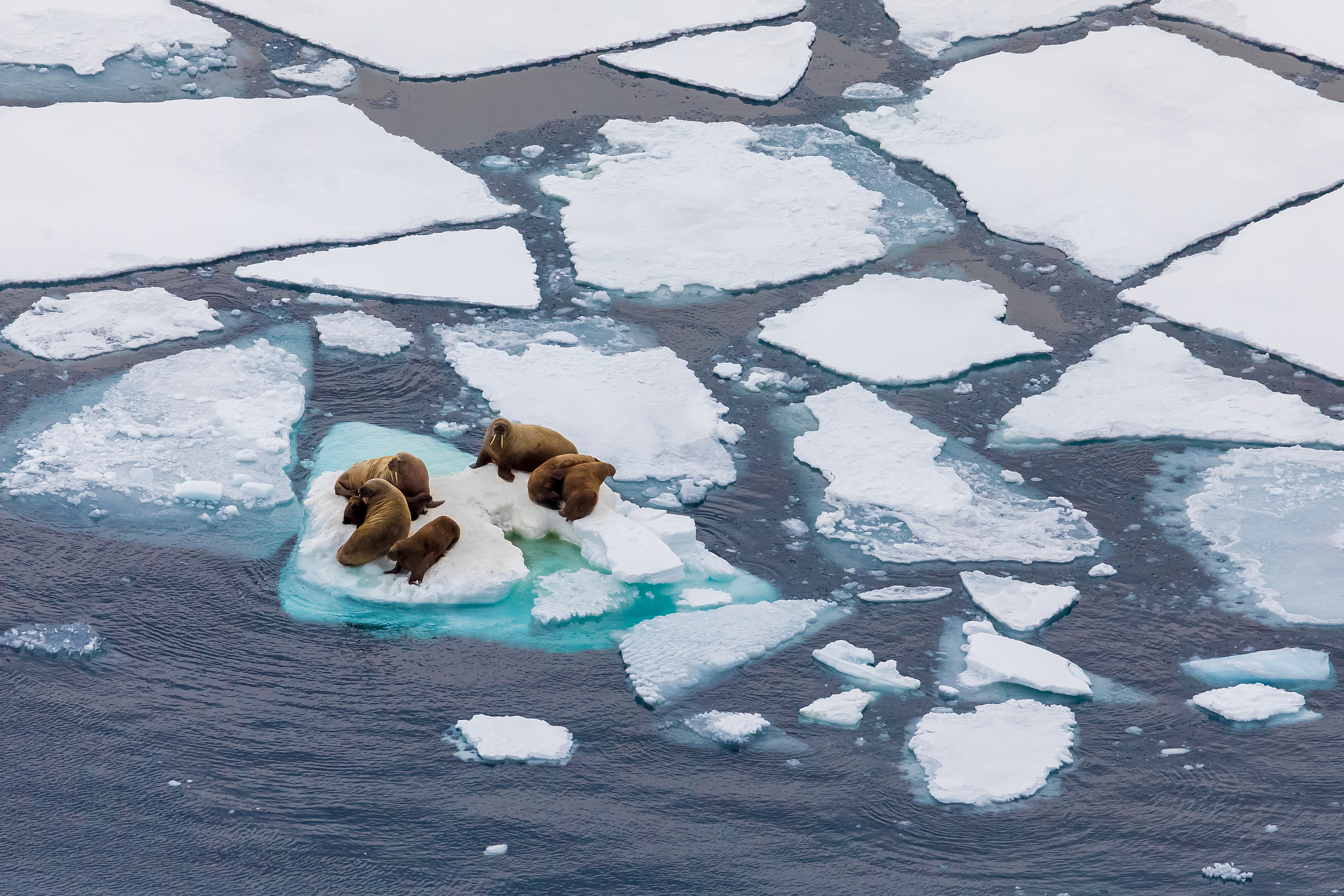
Walruses on Arctic ice floe

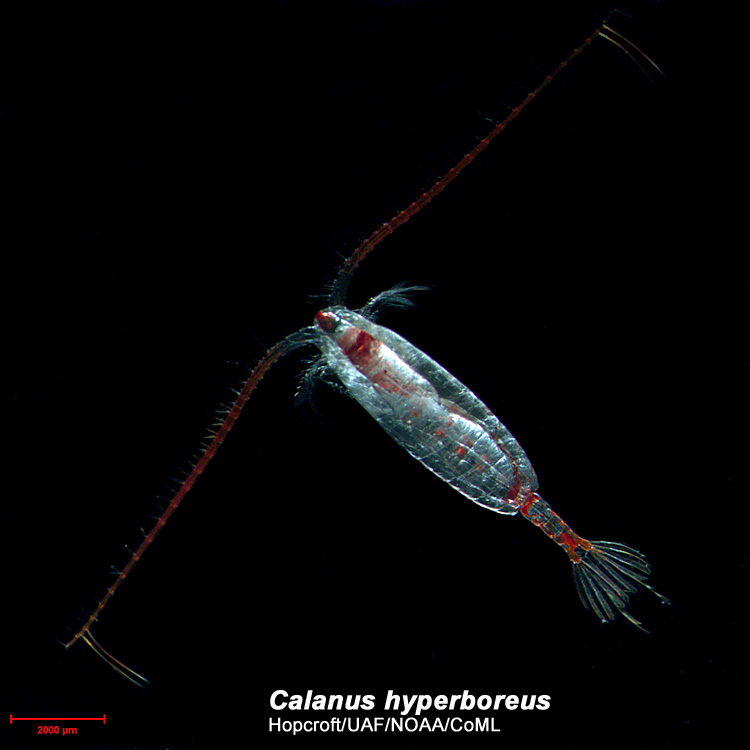
Calanus hyperboreus

== Natural resources ==
Petroleum and natural gas fields, placer deposits, polymetallic nodules, sand and gravel aggregates, fish, seals and whales can all be found in abundance in the region.

The political dead zone near the centre of the sea is also the focus of a mounting dispute between the United States, Russia, Canada, Norway, and Denmark. It is significant for the global energy market because it may hold 25% or more of the world's undiscovered oil and gas resources.

== Environmental concerns ==
=== Arctic ice melting ===
The Arctic ice pack is thinning, and a seasonal hole in the ozone layer frequently occurs. Reduction of the area of Arctic sea ice reduces the planet's average albedo, possibly resulting in global warming in a positive feedback mechanism. Research shows that the Arctic may become ice-free in the summer for the first time in human history by 2040. Estimates vary for when the last time the Arctic was ice-free: 65 million years ago when fossils indicate that plants existed there to as recently as 5,500 years ago; ice and ocean cores going back 8,000 years to the last warm period or 125,000 during the last intraglacial period.

Warming temperatures in the Arctic may cause large amounts of fresh melt-water to enter the north Atlantic, possibly disrupting global ocean current patterns. Potentially severe changes in the Earth's climate might then ensue. As the extent of sea ice diminishes and sea level rises, the effect of storms such as the Great Arctic Cyclone of 2012 on open water increases, as does possible salt-water damage to vegetation on shore at locations such as the Mackenzie Delta as stronger storm surges become more likely.

Global warming has increased encounters between polar bears and humans. Reduced sea ice due to melting is causing polar bears to search for new sources of food. Beginning in December 2018 and coming to an apex in February 2019, a mass invasion of polar bears into the archipelago of Novaya Zemlya caused local authorities to declare a state of emergency. Dozens of polar bears were seen entering homes, public buildings and inhabited areas.

=== Clathrate breakdown ===

The Permian–Triassic extinction event (the Great Dying) may have been caused by release of methane from clathrates. An estimated 52% of marine genera became extinct, representing 96% of all marine species.

Sea ice, and the cold conditions it sustains, serves to stabilize methane deposits on and near the shoreline, preventing the clathrate breaking down and outgassing methane into the atmosphere, causing further warming. Melting of this ice may release large quantities of methane, a powerful greenhouse gas, into the atmosphere, causing further warming in a strong positive feedback cycle and marine genera and species to become extinct.

=== Other concerns ===
Other environmental concerns relate to the radioactive contamination of the Arctic Ocean from, for example, Russian radioactive waste dump sites in the Kara Sea, Cold War nuclear test sites such as Novaya Zemlya, Camp Century's contaminants in Greenland, and radioactive contamination from the Fukushima Daiichi nuclear disaster.

On 16 July 2015, five nations (United States, Russia, Canada, Norway, Denmark/Greenland) signed a declaration committing to keep their fishing vessels out of a 1.1 million square mile zone in the central Arctic Ocean near the North Pole. The agreement calls for those nations to refrain from fishing there until there is better scientific knowledge about the marine resources and until a regulatory system is in place to protect those resources.

== See also ==
- Arctic Bridge
- Arctic cooperation and politics
- Extreme points of the Arctic
- International Arctic Science Committee
- List of rivers of the Americas by coastline
- Nordicity
- Seven Seas
- Subarctic
