= Nordicity =

Nordicity (French: nordicité) is the degree of northernness. The concept was developed by Canadian geographer Louis-Edmond Hamelin in the 1960s based on previous work done in the Soviet Union. Hamelin's system defined northern territories – like northern Canada – not by literal latitude, but as a continuum based on a number of natural and human factors.

Hamelin developed an index he called Valeurs polaires (French for "polar values") or VAPO, where the North Pole had a VAPO of 1000. The nordicity index had 10 natural and human components:

1. latitude
2. summer heat
3. annual cold
4. types of ice
5. total precipitation
6. natural vegetation cover
7. accessibility by means other than air
8. air service
9. population
10. degree of economic activity

Each component was graded on the scale of 0–100 where 100 represented extreme nordicity, with the VAPO representing the sum of these ten components. Hamelin proposed that areas with a VAPO of more than 200 should be considered "the North". He subdivided Canada into Extreme North, Far North, Middle North, and Near North (French: Extrême Nord, Grand Nord, Moyen Nord, Pré-Nord) based on their VAPO. Using the VAPO, most of Canada outside the Southern Vancouver Island and the Lower Mainland, the Prairies, the Quebec City-Windsor Corridor, and most of the Maritimes exhibits some degree of nordicity. . His Extreme North included the northern portion of Canada's Arctic Archipelago. The rest of the archipelago and tundra zone as well as parts of the boreal forest were included in the Far North.

The Canadian government uses a set system for measuring nordicity, which is used for determining a number of regulations in fields such as environmental protection, infrastructure, and many others. Northern Canada, apropos, is normally divided into three areas. The Middle North covering the northern parts of most provinces, as well as parts of the territories is largely populated by those of European descent and has significant resource extraction despite its low population. The Far North covers the northern part of the continent and the southern Arctic Archipelago. The Extreme North covers the northernmost islands and is largely uninhabitable. Other countries have their own systems of measuring nordicity.

The idea of nordicity and the changing conceptions of what is the north has also recently become a subject for historians.

== See also ==
- Extreme points of Canadian provinces
- Extreme communities of Canada
- Remote and isolated community
