= Lomonosov Ridge =

Underwater ridge of continental crust in the Arctic Ocean

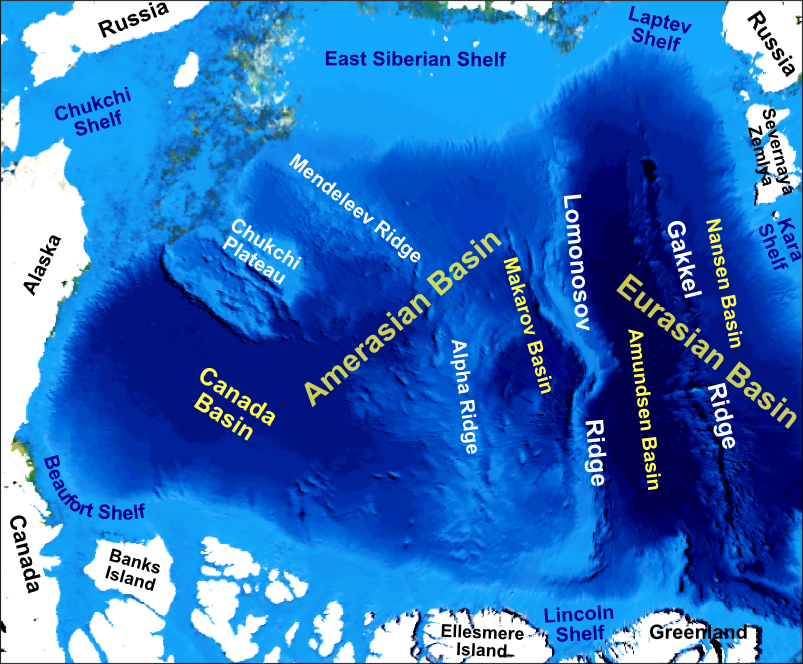
Main bathymetric/topographic features of the Arctic Ocean

The Lomonosov Ridge (Russian: Хребет Ломоносова, Danish: Lomonosovryggen) is an unusual underwater ridge of continental crust in the Arctic Ocean. It spans 1,800 kilometres (1,100 mi) between the New Siberian Islands over the central part of the ocean to Ellesmere Island of the Canadian Arctic Archipelago. The ridge divides the Arctic Basin into the Eurasian Basin and the Amerasian Basin. The width of the Lomonosov Ridge varies from 60 to 200 kilometres (37 to 124 mi). It rises 3,300 to 3,700 metres (10,800 to 12,100 ft) above the 4,200-metre (13,800 ft) deep seabed. The minimum depth of the ocean above the ridge is less than 400 metres (1,300 ft). Slopes of the ridge are relatively steep, broken up by canyons, and covered with layers of silt. It is an aseismic ridge.

The Lomonosov Ridge was first discovered by the Soviet high-latitude expeditions in 1948 and is named after Mikhail Lomonosov. The name was approved by the GEBCO Sub-Committee on Undersea Feature Names (SCUFN).

== 1979 LOREX expedition ==
A Canadian scientific expedition, based out of Alert on Ellesmere Island, established an ice camp on 22 March 1979. The camp, with two other smaller camps, Snowsnake and Iceman lasted a few months with all remnants gone by 10 June 1979.

== Territorial dispute ==
In the 2000s, the geological structure of the ridge attracted international attention due to a 20 December 2001 official submission by the Russian Federation to the UN Commission on the Limits of the Continental Shelf in accordance with the United Nations Convention on the Law of the Sea (article 76, paragraph 8). The document proposed establishing new outer limits for the Russian continental shelf, beyond the previous 200-nautical-mile (370 km; 230 mi) zone, but within the Russian Arctic sector. The territory claimed by Russia in the submission is a large portion of the Arctic reaching the North Pole. One of the arguments was a statement that the underwater Lomonosov Ridge and Mendeleev Ridge are extensions of the Eurasian continent. In 2002 the UN Commission neither rejected nor accepted the Russian proposal, recommending additional research.

Danish scientists hope to prove that the ridge is an extension of Greenland, rather than an extension of Canada's adjacent Ellesmere Island, and Denmark became another claimant to the area in 2014. Canada, also a claimant, asserts that the ridge is an extension of its continental shelf. In April 2007, Canadian and Russian scientists were sent to map the ridge as a possible precedent for determining sovereignty over the area. In late June 2007, Russian scientists reiterated their claim that the ridge is an extension of Russia's territory, and in 2011 a Russian scientist ignored Canada's claim, instead saying that Russia and Denmark claim different parts of the ridge and the claims are not conflicting. Other sources indicate that some areas are disputed.

Canada is expected to make further claims. Denmark and Russia have agreed to follow certain procedures when making claims. If the Danish claims are accepted by the Commission in summer 2015, the distribution of areas may still be a matter of negotiation between claiming countries – a process which can take several years. The rhetoric used in making claims is also subject to discussion.

A 21-member UN arbitration panel is considering the competing claims, with the focus on the Lomonosov Ridge.

=== Arktika 2007 Expedition ===
In late July 2007, a Russian expedition sent an icebreaker and two mini-submarines, Mir-I and Mir-II, to explore the region. Russian scientists dived down 4,261 metres (13,980 ft) below the surface and on 2 August planted a rust-proof titanium metal Russian flag on the seabed. In April 2007, Canada and Denmark, which both claimed part of the ridge, were also mapping it under the polar ice, Canada's CBC reported.

As a follow-up in mid-September 2007, Russia's Natural Resources Ministry issued a statement:

Preliminary results of an analysis of the earth crust model examined by the Arctic-2007 expedition, obtained on 20 September, have confirmed that the crust structure of the Lomonosov Ridge corresponds to the world analogues of the continental crust, and it is therefore part of the Russian Federation's adjacent continental shelf.

=== 2014 Danish claim ===
External images
- Area of the Greenland continental shelf in the Arctic Ocean beyond 200-nautical-mile zone – borders of the 200 nautical miles (370 km; 230 mi) zone are marked in red, territory claimed by Denmark is shaded
- Delineation points

In 2014 Denmark filed a claim with the UN Commission for a 895,000 square kilometres (346,000 sq mi) area around the Lomonosov Ridge, using paragraphs 4, 5 and 6 of Article 76. The connection between Greenland and Lomonosov is stated as going through the Lincoln shelf (400 metres or 1,300 feet below the Lincoln Sea, between the Wandel Sea in the east and Cape Columbia, Canada in the west), which was pushed up when Greenland moved northwards during the late Paleozoic, Paleocene and Eocene time frames. Some rocks from the ridge are similar to those found in Ellesmere, Greenland, Scandinavia and United Kingdom. Connectivity between land and the ridge may be defined from the Foot of the Slope. From the ridge foot claims are made out to 60 nautical miles (110 km; 69 mi) ("Hedberg formula"), or 100 nautical miles (190 km; 120 mi) where the sedimentary layer is more than 1 nautical mile (1.9 km; 1.2 mi) deep ("Gardiner formula", 1% of the distance).

== See also ==
- Russia's 2001 continental shelf claim
- Arctic policy of Russia
- Gakkel Ridge
