= Cerro Divisadero =

Mountain in Southern Patagonian Ice Field

Coordinates: 49°39′33″S 73°09′11″W

- Location within Southern Patagonia

Highest point
- Elevation: 2,570 m (8,430 ft)

Geography
- Location: Located in the disputed area between Argentina and Chile in the Southern Patagonian Ice Field.
- Countries: Argentina; Chile
- Parent range: Andes

Cerro Divisadero is a glaciated mountain in the Andes mountain range in Patagonia, located on the eastern edge of the Southern Patagonian Ice Field, west of Lake Viedma, and near the glacier of the same name within the disputed area between Chile and Argentina. The mountain was named by the French glaciologist Louis Lliboutry.

(from left): Cerro Moyano, Cerro Campana, Cerro Anders and Cerro Divisadero

For Argentina, the mountain has been part of Los Glaciares National Park since 1937, in the Lago Argentino Department of Santa Cruz Province, which was declared a UNESCO World Heritage Site in 1981. For Chile, its western side has been part of Bernardo O'Higgins National Park since 1969, in the Natales commune of Última Esperanza Province in the Magallanes and Chilean Antarctic Region. Its height is 2,570 m (8,430 ft) above sea level, and it is located near Cerro Campana, Cerro Mascarello, and Cerro Moyano.

== History ==
After the signing of the 1881 Treaty between Argentina and Chile, the boundary in the area was defined in 1898 by the boundary surveyors, Francisco Pascasio Moreno from Argentina and Diego Barros Arana from Chile. The surveyors had no differences in the area between Mount Fitz Roy and Cerro Stokes, unlike other territories that were subject to arbitration in the 1902 arbitral award. The boundary was defined by the following mountain landmarks and their natural continuity: Mount Fitz Roy, Torre, Huemul, Campana, Agassiz, Heim, Mayo, and Stokes (nowadays Cervantes).

In 1998, the "Agreement between the Republic of Chile and the Republic of Argentina to determine the boundary line from Mount Fitz Roy to Cerro Daudet" was signed, defining section A and a small part of section B, with the area between Fitz Roy and the Murallón still pending, including landmarks such as Cerro Divisadero.
