= Cerro Roma =

Mountain in Argentina and Chile

Cerro Roma / Vivod / Agassiz Norte
- Southern Patagonian Ice Field, Cerro Cono, Cerro Torino Este, Cerro Agassiz and Roma

Highest point
- Elevation: 3,180 m (10,430 ft)
- Coordinates: 49°57′52″S 73°30′09″W

Naming
- Etymology: Named by Father Alberto María de Agostini

Geography
- Location within Southern Patagonia
- Location: Southern Patagonian Ice Field
- Countries: Argentina; Chile
- Region: Patagonia
- Parent range: Andes

Climbing
- First ascent: Pedro Skvarca (1969)

The Cerro Roma, Cerro Vivod, or Agassiz Norte is a mountain in the Andes, located on the border between Argentina and Chile, in the Patagonia region. The mountain reaches 3,180 m a.s.l. and is located near the westernmost point of Argentina, as defined by the 1998 agreement (49°57′52″S 73°30′09″W DATUM WGS 84).

It is also called Agassiz Norte, distinguishing it from the nearby border peaks Cerro Agassiz and Cerro Agassiz Sur/Oasis.

Cerro Roma was named Cerro Bertrand in the 1998 agreement, however, according to the study carried out by the glaciologist Cedomir Marangunic, the historical Cerro Bertrand is the Cerro Oasis/Agassiz Sur.

On the Argentine side, the mountain is part of the Los Glaciares National Park in the Santa Cruz Province. On the Chilean side, it is part of the Bernardo O'Higgins National Park in the Magallanes and Chilean Antarctica Region.

== Etymology ==
The mountain was named "Roma" by its discoverer and explorer, Father Alberto María de Agostini.

== History ==
After the signing of the 1881 Treaty between Argentina and Chile, the border in the area was defined in 1898 by demarcation experts, Francisco Pascasio Moreno from Argentina and Diego Barros Arana from Chile. The Huemul was declared a boundary marker. The experts had no disagreements between Mount Fitz Roy and Cerro Stokes, unlike other territories that were submitted to arbitration in the 1902 award. The boundary was defined over the following mountain markers and their natural continuity: Fitz Roy, Torre, Huemul, Campana, Agassiz, Heim, Mayo, and Stokes.

In 1998, the "Agreement between the Republic of Chile and the Republic of Argentina to define the boundary between Monte Fitz-Roy and Cerro Daudet" was signed, establishing Section A and part of Section B, leaving the area between Fitz Roy and Murallón pending.
