= Southern Patagonian Ice Field dispute =

Boundary conflict between Chile and Argentina

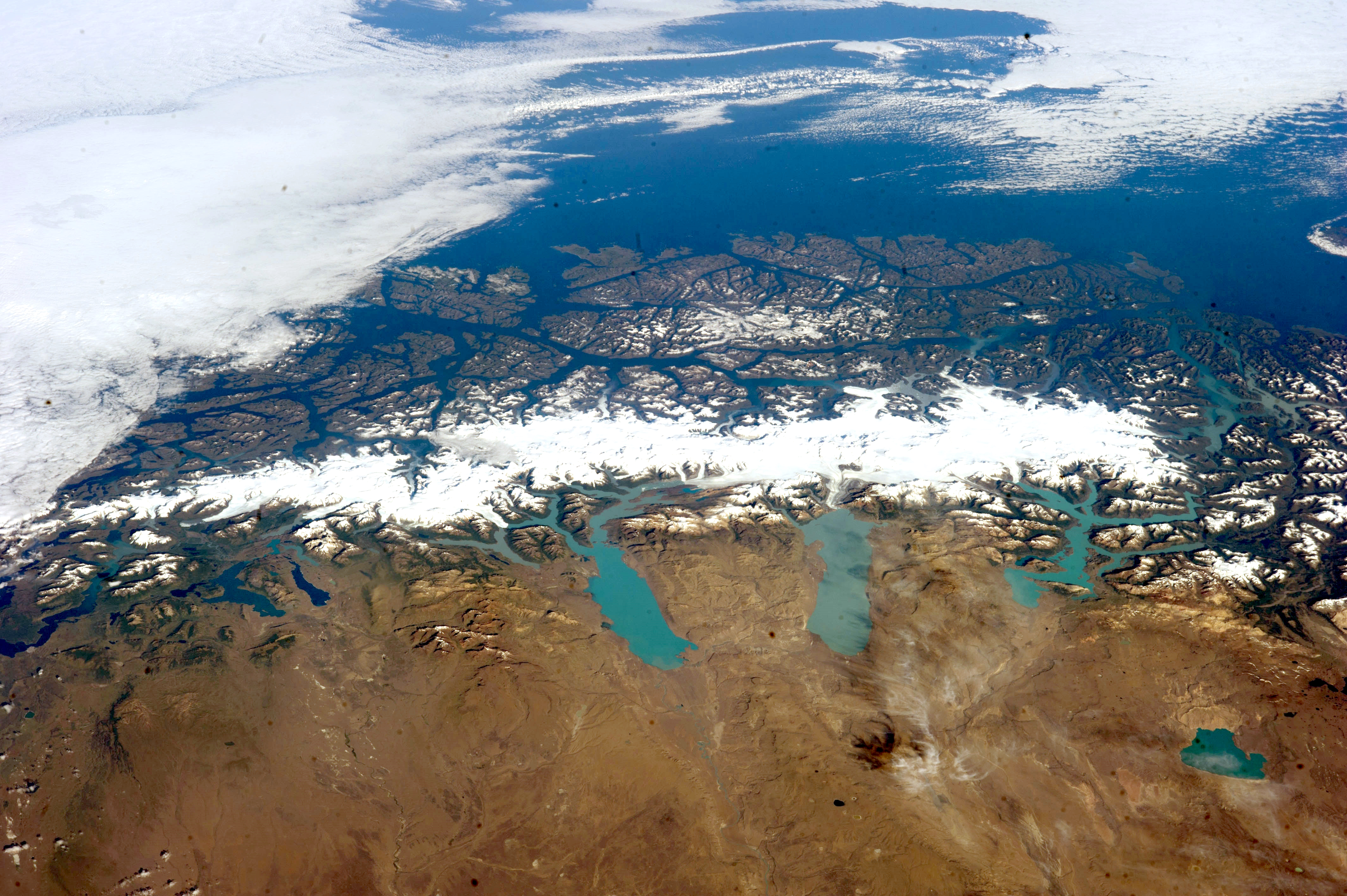
View of the Southern Patagonian ice field from the International Space Station

The Southern Patagonian ice field dispute is a border dispute between Argentina and Chile over the delineation of the boundary line between the two countries on the Southern Patagonian Ice Field, a large expanse of glaciers located in the Patagonian Andes, which is the largest non-polar continental ice field with land access. It is called continental ice in Argentina and southern ice field in Chile, to differentiate it from the northern ice field. As of 2026, the Argentine–Chilean border in this sector is still pending definition according to the 1998 agreement signed by both countries. The original border was defined 100 years prior on 1 October 1898 by experts from both countries.

== History ==
=== Delimitation ===
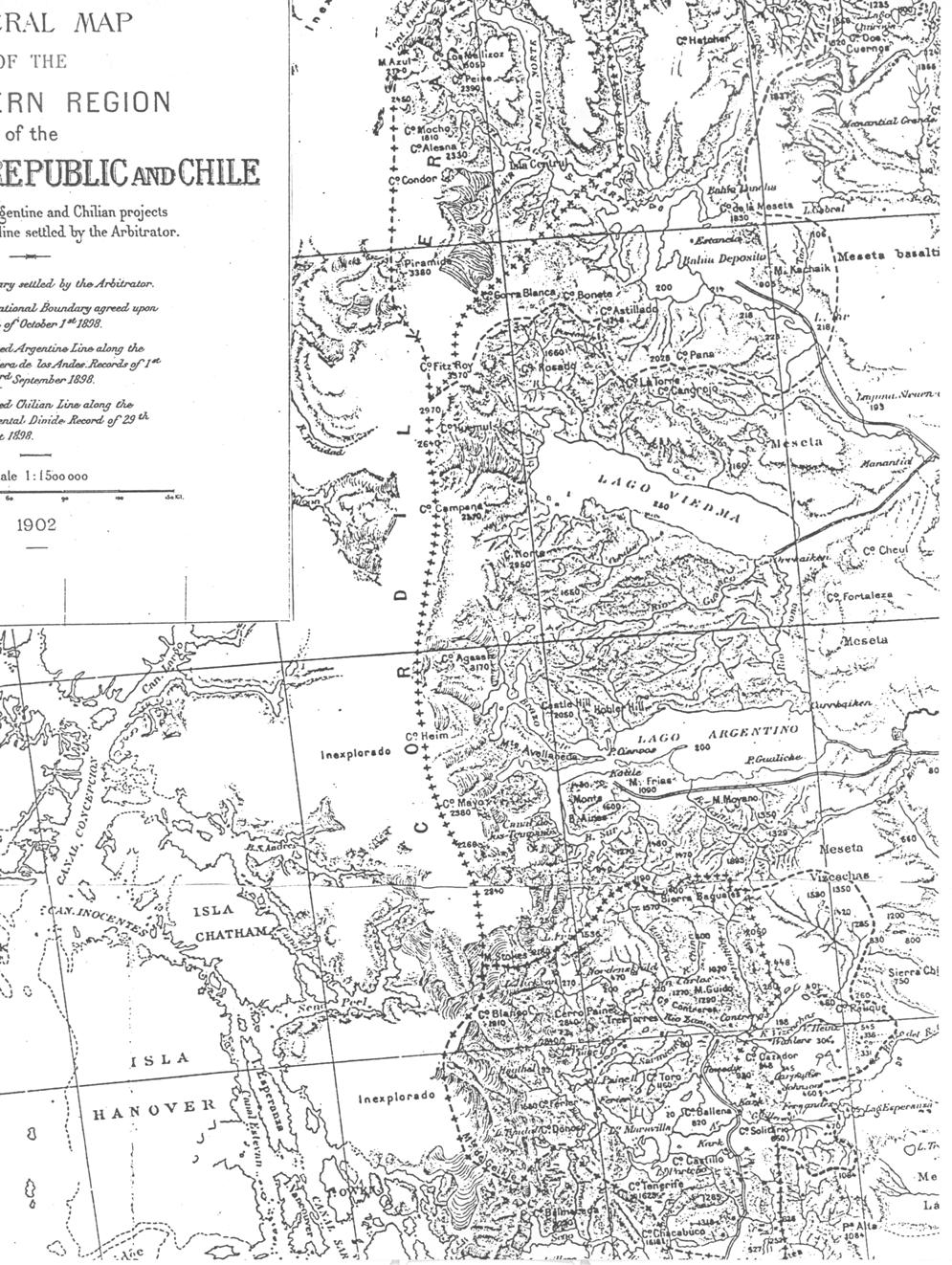
Map of the 1902 award between Argentina and Chile in the area of the Southern Patagonian Ice Field (which was not affected by it)

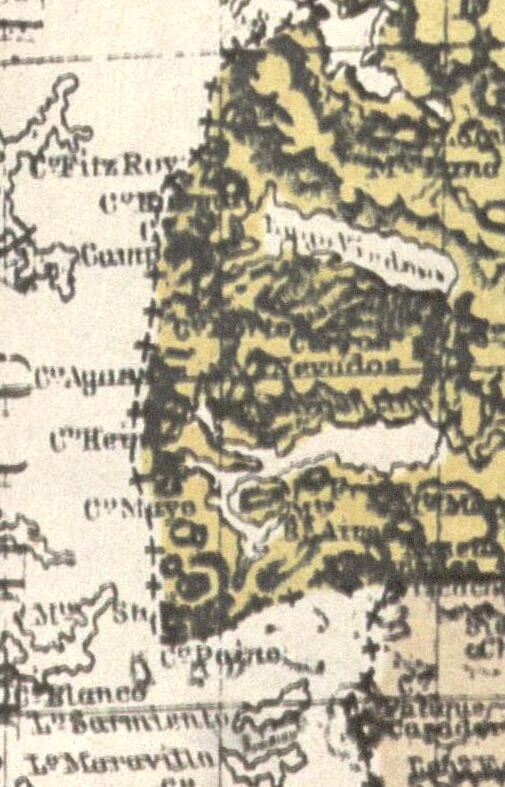
Argentine map of 1912 showing historical boundary markers agreed upon by the Argentine and Chilean experts (Fitz Roy, Huemul, Campana, Agassiz, Heim, Mayo, and Stokes/Cervantes)

The area was delimited by the Treaty of 1881 between Argentina and Chile

The boundary between Chile and the Argentine Republic is, from North to South, up to the fifty-second parallel of latitude, the Andes Mountain Range. The boundary line shall run in that extension along the highest peaks of said Cordillera dividing the waters, and shall pass between the slopes that break off on one side and the other. The difficulties that may arise due to the existence of certain valleys formed by the bifurcation of the Cordillera and where the dividing line of the waters is not clear, shall be resolved amicably by two experts appointed, one from each party. In case they do not reach an agreement, a third Expert appointed by both Governments shall be called upon to decide them. Of the operations carried out by them, a record shall be drawn up in duplicate, signed by the two Experts, on the points on which they have agreed, and also by the third Expert on the points decided by him. These minutes shall take full effect as soon as they have been signed by them and shall be considered firm and valid without the need for any other formalities or formalities. A copy of the minutes shall be sent to each of the Governments.

On 20 August 1888, an agreement was signed to carry out the demarcation of the limits according to the 1881 treaty, appointing the experts Diego Barros Arana for Chile and Octavio Pico Burgess for Argentina. In 1892, Barros Arana presented his thesis according to which the 1881 treaty had fixed the limit in the continental divortium aquarum, which was rejected by the Argentine expert.

Experts have shown that it is always convenient to take the mountain as a support for the boundary and not the watershed. Rey Balmaceda tells an anecdote of Perito Moreno, who diverted the course of the Fénix River, with the help of a crew of laborers, so that it would stop heading toward the Pacific and would swell the waters of the Deseado River. With this, Moreno wanted to demonstrate that the true basis for drawing a solid and efficient line is the mountains and not the course of the waters.

Because differences arose on several points of the border on which the experts could not agree, the demarcation was suspended in February 1892, until the Boundary Protocol between Chile and Argentina 1893 was subscribed, which in its article 1 provides:

Article One of the Treaty of July 23, 1881, stipulating that "the boundary between Chile and the Argentine Republic is from North to South up to the 52nd parallel of latitude, the Andes Cordillera", and that "the boundary line shall run along the highest peaks of the said Cordillera, dividing the waters, and that it shall pass between the slopes that break off on either side", the Experts and the Sub-Commissions shall have this principle as the invariable rule of their proceedings. Consequently, all lands and all waters, namely: lakes, lagoons, rivers and parts of rivers, streams and slopes east of the line of the highest peaks of the Andes Mountains dividing the waters, shall be considered in perpetuity as property and absolute domain of the Argentine Republic, and all lands and all waters, namely: lakes, lagoons, rivers and parts of rivers, streams and slopes east of the highest peaks of the Andes Mountains dividing the waters, shall be considered as property and absolute domain of Chile: lakes, lagoons, rivers, and parts of rivers, streams, slopes, which are found to the west of the highest peaks of the Andes Mountains that divide the waters.

This protocol is of particular importance, as the retreat of the glaciers could allow Pacific fjords to penetrate into Argentine territory.

In January 1894, the Chilean expert declared that he understood that the main chain of the Andes was the uninterrupted line of peaks that divide the waters and that form the separation of the basins or tributary hydrographic regions of the Atlantic to the east and the Pacific to the west. The Argentine expert Norberto Quirno Costa (Pico's replacement) replied that they had no authority to define the meaning of the main chain of the Andes as they were only demarcators.

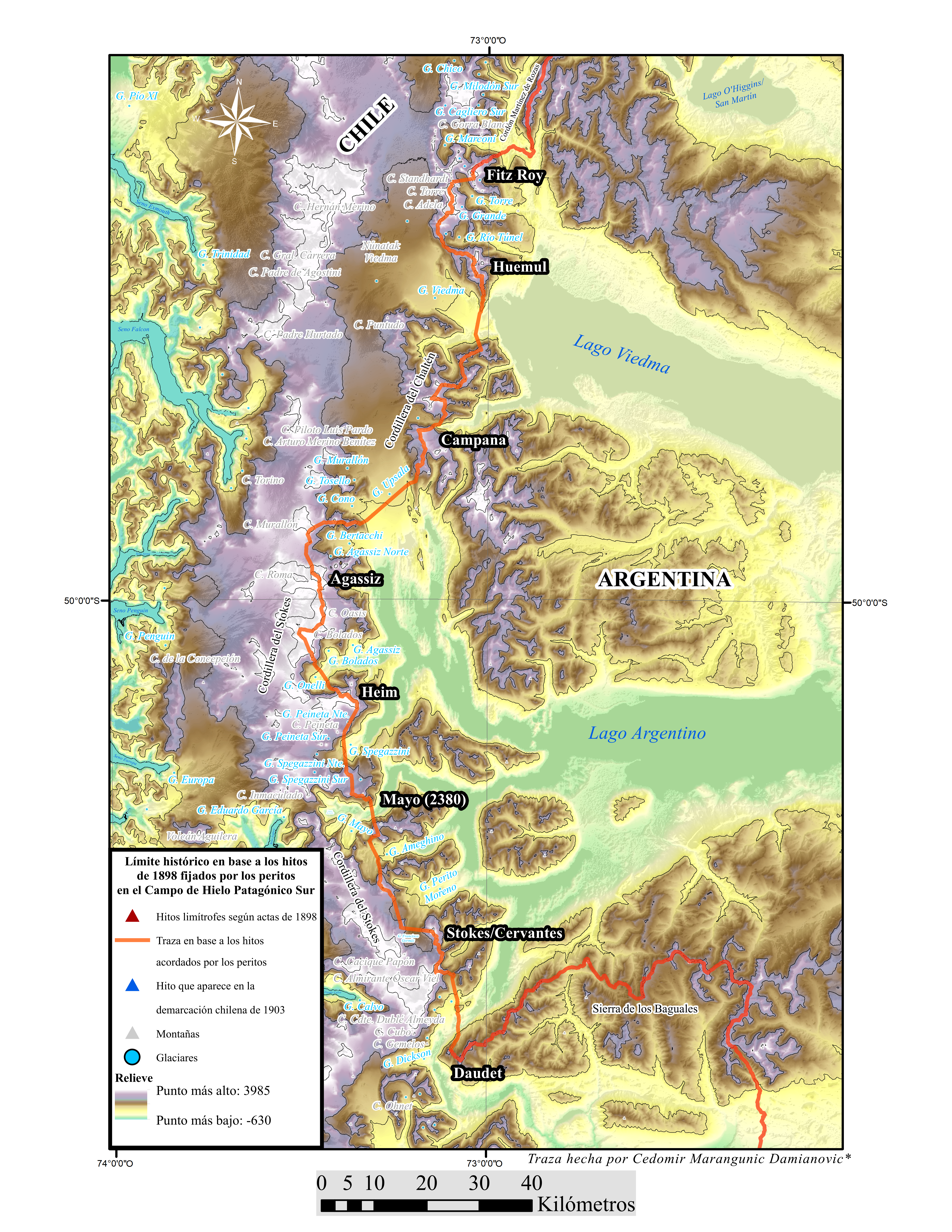
Boundary based on 1898 landmarks set by the peritos in the Southern Patagonian Ice Field.

In April 1896, the agreement to facilitate territorial delimitation operations was signed, which appointed the British monarch to arbitrate in case of disagreements. In the minutes of 1 October 1898, signed by Diego Barros Arana and Francisco Moreno (Quirno Costa's replacement, who resigned in September 1896) and by his assistants Clemente Onelli (from Argentina) and Alejandro Bertrand (from Chile), the experts:

agree with the points and stretches indicated [...] 331 and 332 [...], resolv[ing] to accept them as forming part of the dividing line [...] between the Republic of Argentina and the Republic of Chile [...].

On the attached map, point 331 is Fitz Roy and 332 is Mount Stokes, both being agreed as boundary markers, although the former is not on the watershed and was taken as a natural landmark. As the experts did not access the area, they established the caveat that if the geographical principle did not run where they had supposed it did, there could be modifications.

When the experts could not agree on different stretches of the border, it was decided in 1898 to resort to Article VI paragraph 2 of the 1881 Boundary Treaty and request Queen Victoria of the United Kingdom for an arbitration ruling on the issue, who appointed three British judges. In 1901, one of the judges, Colonel Thomas Holdich, traveled to study the disputed areas.

The Argentine government argued that the boundary should essentially be an orographic boundary along the highest peaks of the Andes and the Chilean government argued for a continental watershed. The tribunal considered that the language of the 1881 treaty and the 1893 protocol was ambiguous and susceptible to various interpretations, the two positions being irreconcilable. On 20 May 1902, King Edward VII issued the sentence which divided the territories of the four disputed sections within the boundaries defined by the extreme claims on both sides and appointed a British officer to demarcate each section in mid-1903. The award did not issue on the ice field, for, in its article 3, it sentenced:

From Mount Fitz Roy to Mount Stokes the boundary line has already been determined.

The award thus considered that in that area the high peaks are water dividing and therefore there was no dispute. Both experts, Francisco Moreno from Argentina and Diego Barros Arana from Chile agreed on the border between Fitz Roy and Stokes. Since 1898, the demarcation of the border in the ice field according to the minutes, between the two mountains, was defined on the next mountains and their natural continuity: Fitz Roy, Torre, Huemul, Campana, Agassiz, Heim, Mayo, and Stokes (nowadays Cervantes). In 1916, the Mariano Moreno range was visited by an expedition; however, Francisco Moreno already knew of its existence.

Landmarks recorded in the 1898 experts' records, and the location they understood them to be at
Landmark	Coordinates (DMS)	Coordinates (decimal)
Fitz Roy	49°16′17.02″ S, 73°02′36.80″ W	49.271394°S 73.043556°W
Huemul	49°25′21.59″ S, 73°02′08.57″ W	49.4226639°S 73.0357139°W
Campana	49°42′42.38″ S, 73°10′56.81″ W	49.7117722°S 73.1824472°W
Agassiz	49°57′34.19″ S, 73°27′16.71″ W	49.9594972°S 73.4546417°W
Heim	50°09′49.55″ S, 73°22′12.64″ W	50.1637639°S 73.3701778°W
Mayo 2380	50°20′35.25″ S, 73°19′16.45″ W	50.343125°S 73.3212361°W
Stokes (now Cervantes)	50°34′12.17″ S, 73°08′47.92″ W	50.5700472°S 73.1466444°W

=== Demarcation ===
Territorial dispute between Chile and Argentina over the Southern Patagonian Ice Field before 1994

In 1941, the protocol regarding the repositioning of milestones on the Argentine–Chilean border was signed, creating the Joint Commission on Boundaries (COMIX), formed by technicians from both countries. These technicians were to be in charge of demarcating the border on the basis of the criteria established by the 1881 treaty and the 1893 protocol.

On 29 August 1990, Presidents Carlos Menem and Patricio Aylwin signed the Santiago Declaration, which instructed the Joint Boundary Commission to accelerate demarcation work and issue a report on pending demarcation issues.

On 12 September 1990, the Joint Commission, through Minute No. 132, defined the 24 points that remained to be demarcated on the border. On 10 and 12 February 1990, the Commission met in Punta Arenas, resolving 22 of the 24 areas not yet demarcated.

In Chile, it was argued that the experts identified in 1898 as intermediate summits between the Fitz Roy and Stokes mounts: Torre, Huemul, Campana, Murallón, Agassiz, Bolados, Peineta, and Mayo. The Stokes of 1898 was considered to be the Cervantes. Giving definitive character to what they saw according to the techniques and knowledge of their time. With a chart of the Military Geographic Institute of 1972 at a scale of 1:50,000, they determined that the line should be drawn from the Fitz Roy by: the Adela range (Torre, Ñato, and Grande hills), Doblado, Huemul, Campana, Murallón, Cono, Agassiz, Bertrand (Oasis), Bolados, Peineta, Mayo, Cervantes, the Piedrabuena range, Cubo, and from there to the Daudet.

In Argentina, it was argued that the demarcation should be made along the highest peaks dividing waters, as agreed in 1881 and with the most modern techniques available to determine it. Taking as a reference six charts of the National Geographic Institute made between 1981 and 1991 at a scale of 1:100,000, they determined that the line should be drawn from Fitz Roy to a point on the Mariano Moreno range, from where the criterion of the highest peaks dividing waters is followed by the following hills: Murallón, East Torino, Roma, Bolados, Onelli Central, a peak of 2,130 meters (6,990 ft), the Malaspina range, the two hills Inmaculados, Dos Codos range, the Pietrobelli range, a hill of the Piedrabuena range, Cubo, and Stokes.

The Murallón and Bolados hills were the only two points in common of both intended routes.

On 2 August 1991, Presidents Menem and Aylwin signed an agreement to draw a polygonal line to equitably divide the disputed territory from Fitz Roy to Stokes, leaving aside what had been agreed upon in 1881 and 1893.

The polygonal line began at Fitz Roy, continued in a straight line westward to an unnamed point (2,584 m (8,478 ft) high), then crossed the Viedma glacier to Mount Puntudo and continued through East Torino, Roma, Inmaculado, Dos Picos, Teniente Feilberg, Gemelo, Stokes, and Daudet. All the points were connected by straight lines.

In his presentation to the congress on 27 February 1992, the Argentine minister Guido Di Tella argued that the polygonal shape had been agreed upon because of the geophysical impossibility to determine where the high peaks that divide waters are located.

The polygonal line was not accepted by the congresses of the two countries. Argentina claimed the loss of 1,057 square kilometers (408 mi^{2}) of Los Glaciares National Park and Chile claimed the loss of 1,238 square kilometers (478 mi^{2}) of Bernardo O'Higgins National Park if the line was approved.

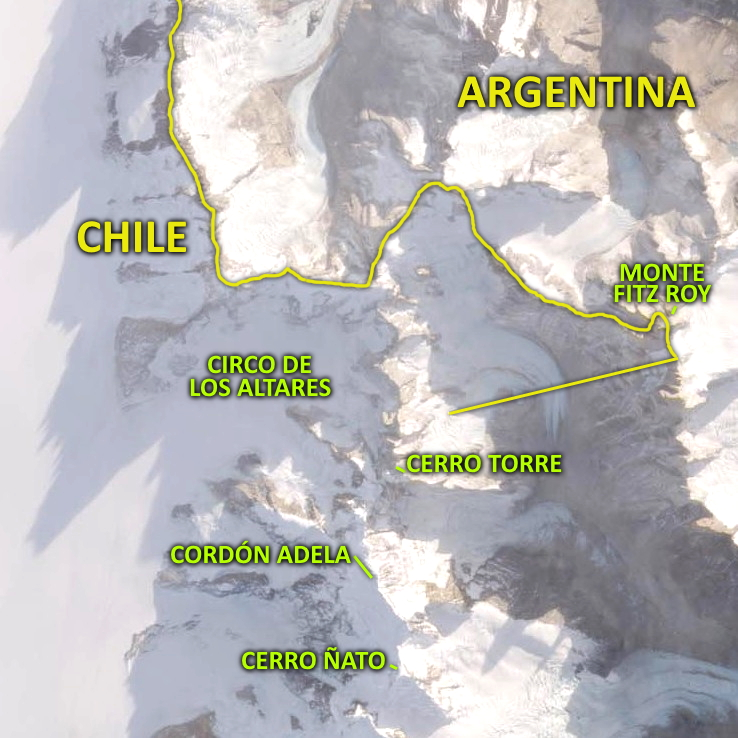
The ruling made the Circo de los Altares Chile's only access to Mount Fitz Roy.

In 1994, the Laguna del Desierto incident was solved which involved territory of the Ice Field, an international tribunal awarded almost the whole zone to Argentina. After a refused appeal in 1995, Chile accepted the award. Since then, Chile has a small corridor to access Fitz Roy and the Marconi Pass was defined as an international border crossing point.

== Agreement ==
This map shows section A and B of the agreement

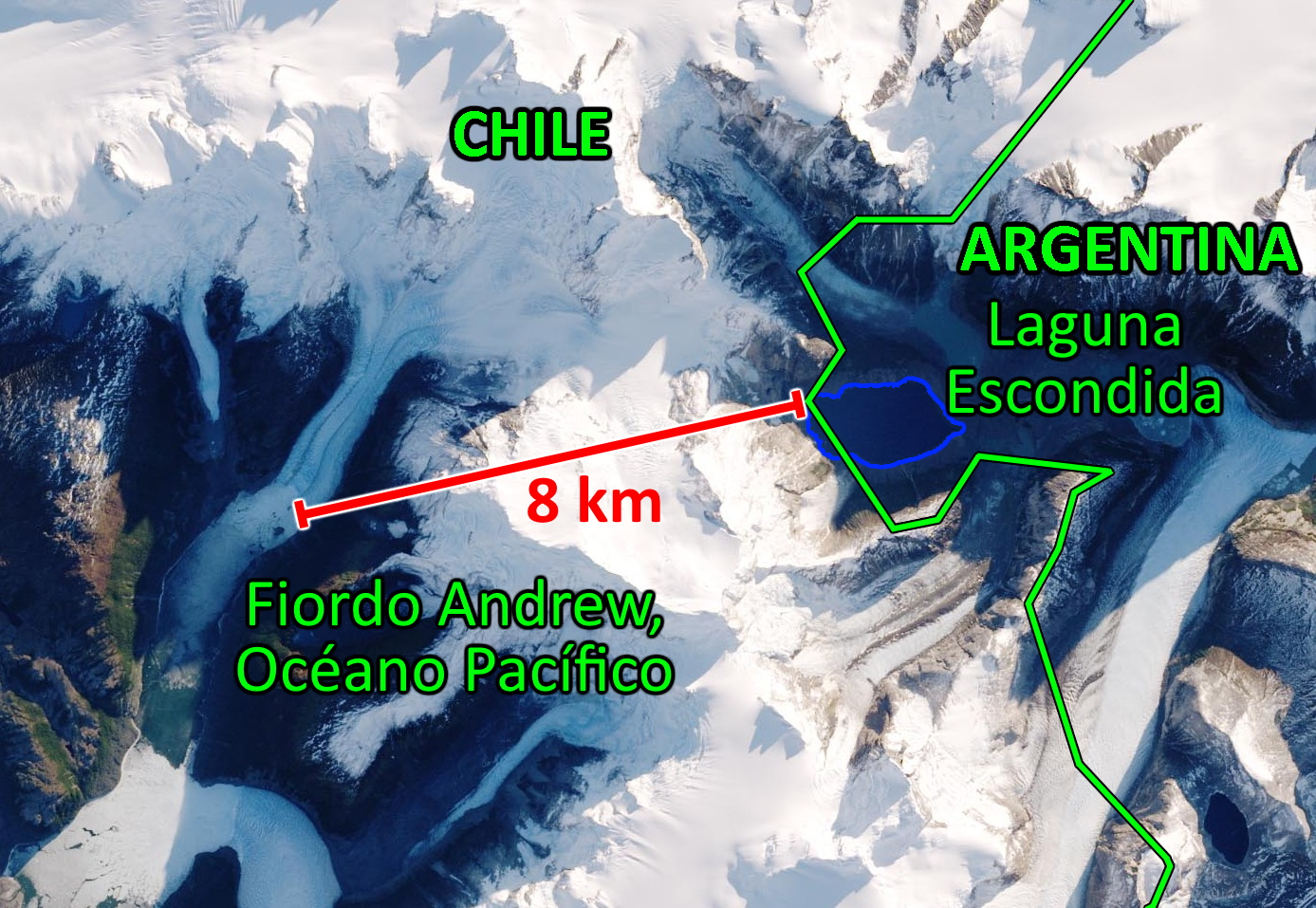
The area of Laguna Escondida is a point where the boundary would be in such a way that Argentina is approximately eight kilometers (5.0 mi) from the Pacific Ocean.

On 16 December 1998, the agreement was signed to specify the route of the boundary from Fitz Roy to Mount Daudet to replace the proposed polygonal line. The agreement maintains what was signed in the 1881 treaty, high peaks that divide waters and respects the continental watershed, except in some sectors where straight lines are drawn. It also maintains access for Chile to Fitz Roy and for Argentina to Mount Stokes.

The territory covered by the agreement is divided into two sectors:

- Section A: from Murallón Hill to Daudet Hill. The boundary line is determined as follows: starting from Murallón Hill, the line follows the watershed that passes through East Torino, North Agassiz (Roma, mistakenly named Bertrand), South Agassiz (Bertrand), Bolados, Onelli Central, Spegazzini North and Spegazzini South. Then the line continues by straight line segments joining, successively, the points marked with the letters A, B, C, D, E, F, F, G, H, I, and J. Between J and K, it follows the watershed, then by straight lines joining points L and M. It continues along the watershed to N, from where it continues along the watershed through the hills Pietrobelli, Gardener, Cacique Casimiro, and point Ñ. Then by a straight line it reaches point O and by another straight line it reaches Teniente Feilberg hill, continues along the watershed up to point P, from where by straight line segments it reaches point Q, Stokes hill, points R, S, T, and Daudet hill, where it ends its route.
- Section B: from the summit of Fitz Roy to Cerro Murallón. From the summit of Fitz Roy, the line will descend along the watershed to a point at coordinates 49°16′37″S 73°02′24″W (Point A). From there, it will continue in a straight line to a point located at coordinates 49°17′02″S 73°05′12″W (Point B). Then the line will follow the parallel of the site to the west and will be drawn in accordance with the Protocol on Replacement and Placement of Landmarks on the Chilean–Argentine Border of 16 April 1941 and in the Plan of Work and General Provisions governing the Chile–Argentine Joint Boundary Commission.

In the area determined between the parallels of South Latitude 49º10'00" and 49º47'30" and the meridians of West Longitude 73º38'00" and 72º59'00", the Chile–Argentina Joint Boundary Commission must draw up a chart at a scale of 1:50,000 in order to demarcate the boundary, in that sector the Additional Specific Protocol on Shared Water Resources of 2 August 1991 will not be applied. This sector corresponds to a rectangular territory that goes from a few kilometers north of the summit of Fitz Roy to Mount Murallón, in which there is an area without boundary demarcation. Within this area, however, the agreement itself demarcated the boundary from Fitz Roy to a few kilometers to the southwest (point B), and, from the same mountain to the north, it was defined by means of the 1994 Laguna del Desierto arbitration award.

It was agreed that all waters flowing into and out of the Santa Cruz River shall be considered for all purposes as a water resource belonging to Argentina. Likewise, the waters flowing toward the oceanic fjords shall be considered for all purposes as water resources belonging to Chile, each party committing itself not to alter, in quantity and quality, the exclusive water resources corresponding to the other party.

María Teresa Infante Caffi and José Miguel Insulza were some of the main promoters of the agreement within Chile.

== Pending border definition area ==
Boundary of the Southern Patagonian Ice Field shown on official Chilean cartography. The boundary agreed upon in the 1998 Agreement is shown and the pending area is specified.

Boundary of the Southern Patagonian Ice Field shown in the current official Argentine cartography. Nothing of what was established in 1998 by both countries is shown.

Boundary of the Southern Patagonian Ice Field according to official Chilean cartography prior to 1994

In February 2006, Ricardo Lagos appeared in a photo with the head of the Air Force, General Osvaldo Sarabia, in the undefined border area; this caused controversy with Argentina.

In 2006, the Argentine Instituto Geográfico Militar (IGM) (today Instituto Geográfico Nacional) edited a map without a note about the undefined border but showed the Argentine claims as the official borderline. After Chilean diplomatic protests, the Argentine government withdrew the map temporally and urged Chile to expedite the "demarcation" of the international border according to the 1998 agreement.

The Joint Commission on Boundaries that was entrusted by the Agreement to carry out the geographic studies and draw up the 1:50 000 scale chart, an essential requirement to carry out the demarcation on the ground, had not yet been formed as of 30 August the same year. On that date, the chancelleries of both countries issued communiqués, the communique of the Argentine Chancellery stating that:

In view of the statements made in a press release issued by the Chilean Ministry of Foreign Affairs today regarding the "Agreement between the Republic of Argentina and the Republic of Chile to specify the route of the boundary from Mount Fitz Roy to Mount Daudet" of December 16, 1998, the Argentine Ministry of Foreign Affairs takes note of Chile's interest in complying with the above-mentioned Agreement and recalls the invitation extended by the Argentine Boundary Commission to its Chilean counterpart by letter sent on February 16, 2006, to demand compliance with it, the Argentine Ministry of Foreign Affairs takes note of Chile's interest in complying with the aforementioned Agreement and recalls the invitation extended by the Argentine Boundary Commission to its Chilean counterpart by letter sent on February 27, 2006 to demarcate the boundary whose route is fully specified in that instrument.

Not having received to date no response from Chile to the aforementioned invitation, this Ministry of Foreign Affairs has instructed the Argentine International Boundary Commission to reiterate to its counterpart the need to begin the demarcation work as soon as possible and to propose the implementation of the first tasks necessary for this purpose.

The exchange of communiqués had occurred due to the Chilean government's complaint regarding the non-use of the rectangle of the undefined border area on maps of the Argentine Secretariat of Tourism. On 24 August 2006, the Argentine Undersecretary of Tourism stated that the maps used by the Secretariat of Tourism's website were official because they were approved by the Military Geographic Institute of Argentina (and are still used to this day).

In 2006, Presidents Michelle Bachelet and Néstor Kirchner held a meeting over the cartographic controversy. Kirchner served as the governor of the Santa Cruz Province from 1991 to 2003.

In the maps published in Argentina, the region continues to be shown without the white rectangle, as can be seen in a map of Santa Cruz on a website of an official Argentine agency; while in the official Chilean maps and most tourist maps, the rectangle is shown and it is clarified that the boundary is not defined according to the 1998 treaty.

Newspaper reports indicate that, on 8 January 2008, daily flights began in Argentine Army helicopters, based in El Chaltén, with personnel from the National Geographic Institute to carry out the geographic surveys necessary to draw up the map prescribed in the agreement. Reports indicate that Chilean personnel acted as overseers, while the Chilean Army performed similar tasks in other sectors. Technicians of both countries worked on the definition of the border.

In 2006 and 2010, the Argentine Foreign Ministry pressured to solve the dispute.

In 2018, Argentina made a National Ice Inventory in which are included some disputed glaciers. From 20 September to 4 October the same year, the Argentine army traveled to into the area that is pending to be definition. This caused controversy mainly in Chile where the mayor of O'Higgins denounced the fact as a "provocation" and made a call to the central government of Chile to reinforce the sovereignty in the zone.

After the Argentine government published its inventory of glaciers including undefined territory, the Chilean Foreign Ministry informed that a claim note had already been sent denying the Argentine inventory.

In 2021, the Chilean president Sebastián Piñera authorized the chart SHOA N° 8 not to show the rectangle in the non-defined zone and express the continental shelf claimed by Chile in the Sea of the Southern Zone. Until before the enacted decree, and also after it, on official Chilean maps and also on tourist maps, Chilean maps show a rectangle clarifying that the boundary was not defined according to the 1998 agreement. In the map of Piñera's decree of 23 August that year, it was not shown as such and the cartography prior to 1998 was used. Both countries consider that they have about a thousand kilometers more ice than the other, which is reflected in the cartographic difference.

The same year there was a controversy since the National Forest Corporation (from Chile) installed a dome in the Circo de los Altares, the southern part of which is claimed by both countries.

As of 2024, the new border definition is still pending between the line near Fitz Roy and Murallón.

== See also ==
- Dispute over the extended continental shelf in the Southern Sea between Argentina and Chile
- Laguna del Desierto incident
- Beagle conflict
- 1977 Beagle Channel arbitration
- Puna de Atacama dispute
- 1902 Arbitral award of the Andes between Argentina and Chile
- Alto Palena–Encuentro River dispute
- East Patagonia, Tierra del Fuego and Strait of Magellan dispute
- Argentina-Chile relations
