= Del Viento Pass =

Mountain pass of Chile and Argentina

Coordinates: 49.396°S 73.117°W

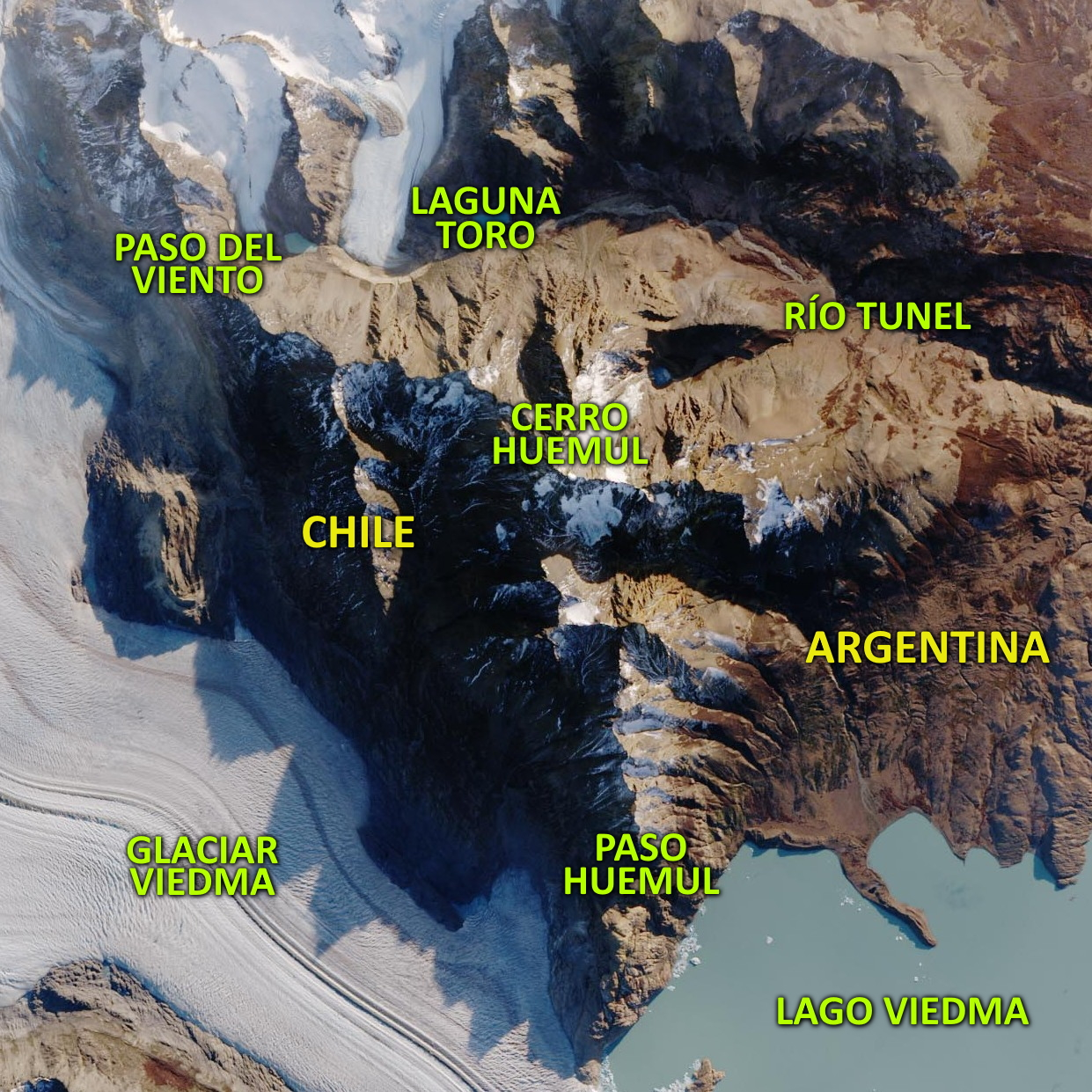
- Paso del Viento in the Southern Patagonian Ice Field.

Third Approach
- Location: Chile / Argentina
- Range: Andes

The Del Viento Pass (Paso del Viento in Spanish) is a mountain pass located in the disputed area between Chile and Argentina in the Southern Patagonian Ice Field. The pass connects the ice field with the Argentine town of El Chaltén.

On the Chilean side, it is part of the Bernardo O'Higgins National Park in the Natales commune, Última Esperanza Province, Magallanes and Chilean Antarctica Region, while on the Argentine side, it is part of the Los Glaciares National Park located in the Lago Argentino Department in the Santa Cruz Province. Prior to the 1998 agreement between the two countries, the area was considered a border crossing between the two countries by Chile.

The location offers the most panoramic view of the ice field, combining steppe, Patagonian Andean forest, and high mountain landscapes.

It is located near Cerro Huemul and Laguna Toro, with the closest settlements being El Chaltén in Argentina and Candelario Mancilla and Puerto Edén in Chile, as well as the Eduardo García Soto Refuge.

== See also ==
- Huemul Pass
- Cerro Huemul
