= Huemul Pass =

Coordinates: 49.4863°S 73.0146°W

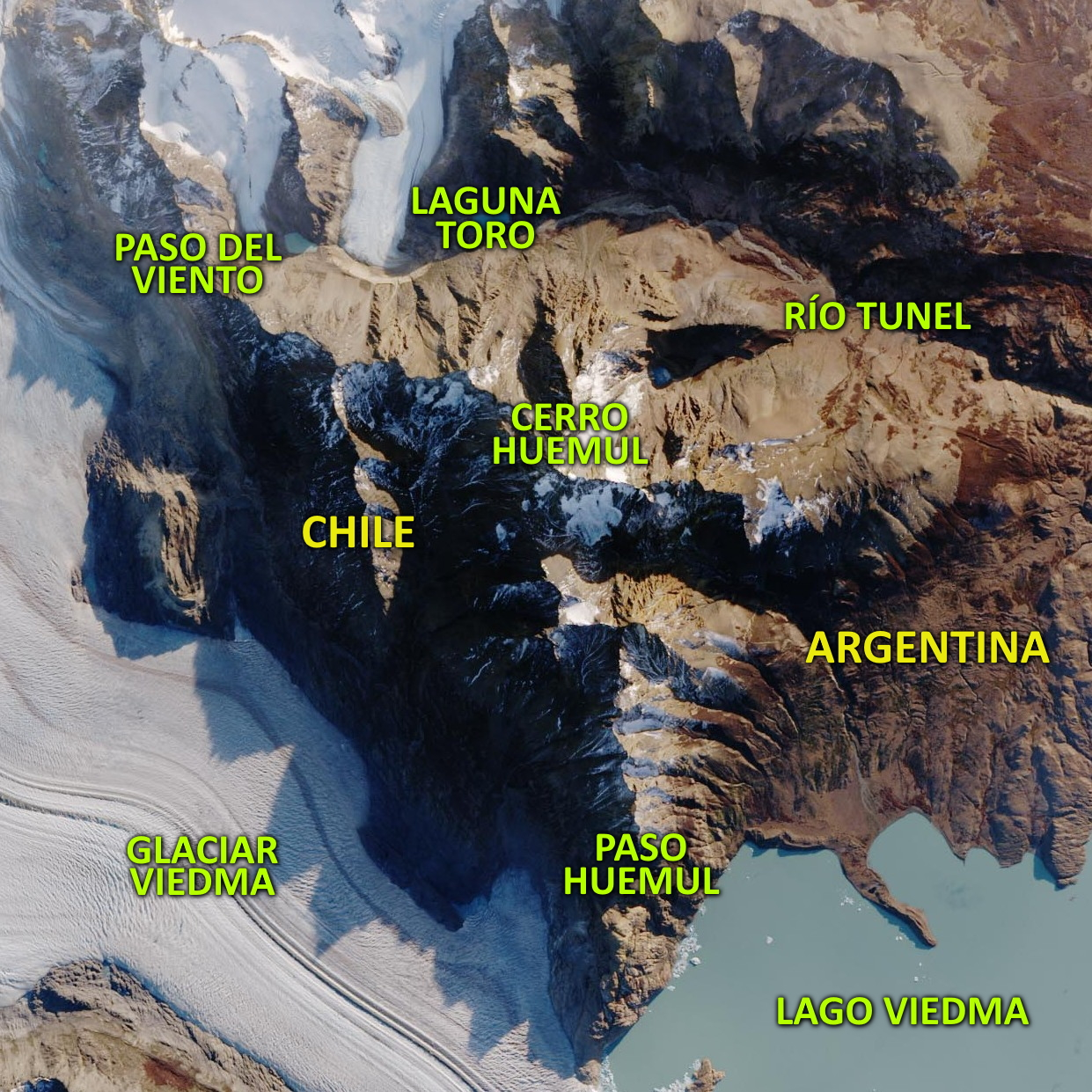
- Huemul Pass in the Southern Patagonian Ice Field.

Third Approach
- Location: Chile / Argentina
- Range: Andes

Huemul Pass is a mountain pass located in the disputed area between Chile and Argentina in the Southern Patagonian Ice Field. The pass connects the Viedma Glacier with the Argentine town of El Chaltén.

On the Chilean side, it is part of the Bernardo O'Higgins National Park in the Natales commune, Última Esperanza Province, Magallanes and Chilean Antarctic Region, while on the Argentine side it is located in the Los Glaciares National Park in the Lago Argentino Department, Santa Cruz Province. Prior to the 1998 agreement between both countries, the area was considered a border pass by Chile.

It is located near Cerro Huemul, with the nearest settlements being El Chaltén in Argentina and Candelario Mancilla and Puerto Edén in Chile, as well as the Eduardo García Soto refuge.

== See also ==
- Del Viento Pass
- Cerro Huemul
- Marconi Pass
