= Cerro Campana =

Mountain in Southern Patagonian Ice Field

Coordinates: 49°42′42″S 73°10′56″W

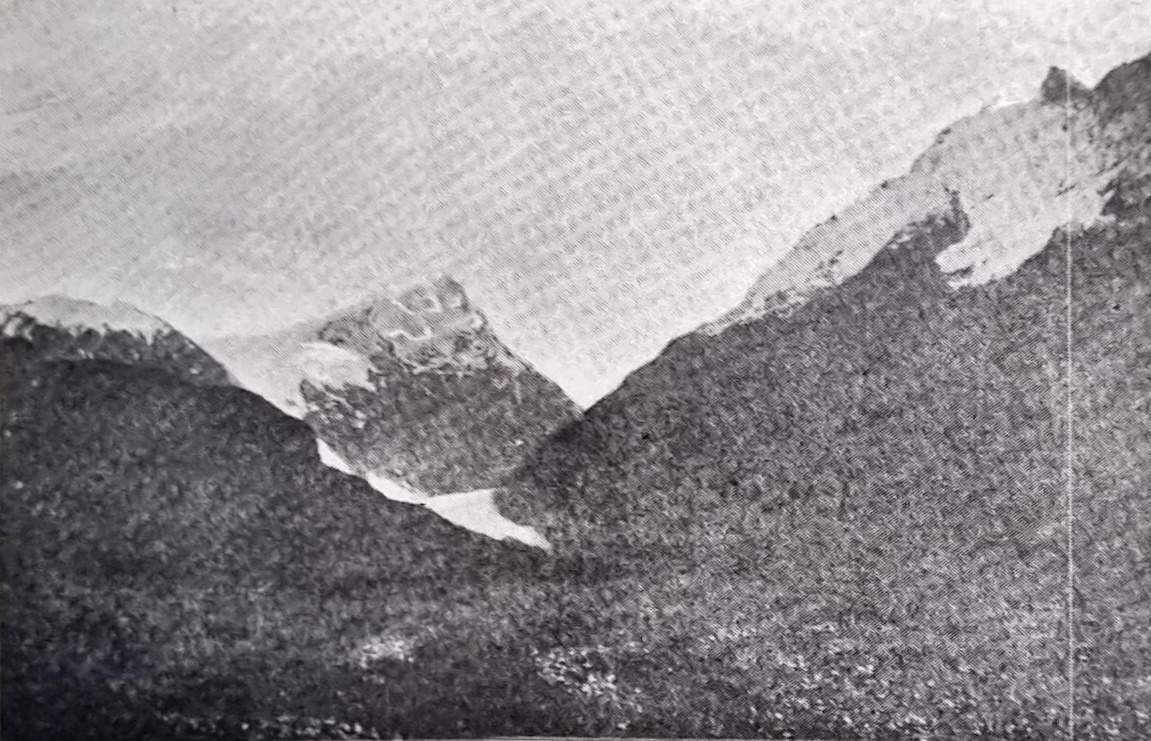
- Mount Campana in the Cordillera to the west of Lake Viedma, Francisco Pascacio Moreno, 1902.

Highest point
- Elevation: 2,094 m (6,870 ft)

Geography
- Location within Southern Patagonia
- Location: Located in the disputed area between Argentina and Chile in the Southern Patagonian Ice Field.
- Countries: Argentina; Chile
- Parent range: Andes

Cerro Campana or Cerro Cristal is a glaciated mountain in the Andes mountain range in Patagonia, located on the eastern edge of the Southern Patagonian Ice Field, west of Lake Viedma, and south of the glacier of the same name within the disputed area between Chile and Argentina.

For Argentina, the mountain has been part of Los Glaciares National Park since 1937, in the Lago Argentino Department of Santa Cruz Province, which was declared a UNESCO World Heritage Site in 1981. For Chile, its western side has been part of Bernardo O'Higgins National Park since 1969, in the Natales commune of Última Esperanza Province in the Magallanes and Chilean Antarctic Region. Its height is 2,094 m (6,870 ft) above sea level, and it is located near Cerro Divisadero, Cerro Mascarello and Cerro Moyano.

According to a study by the glaciologist Cedomir Marangunic, the original location understood by the expert Francisco Moreno in 1898 of the mountain is the same as cerro Cristal, being Agostini who misplaced it to the north in the Cerro Divisadero. Marangunic takes as reference a description of the mountain in Moreno's book called "Argentine-Chilean Border - Volume II".

== History ==
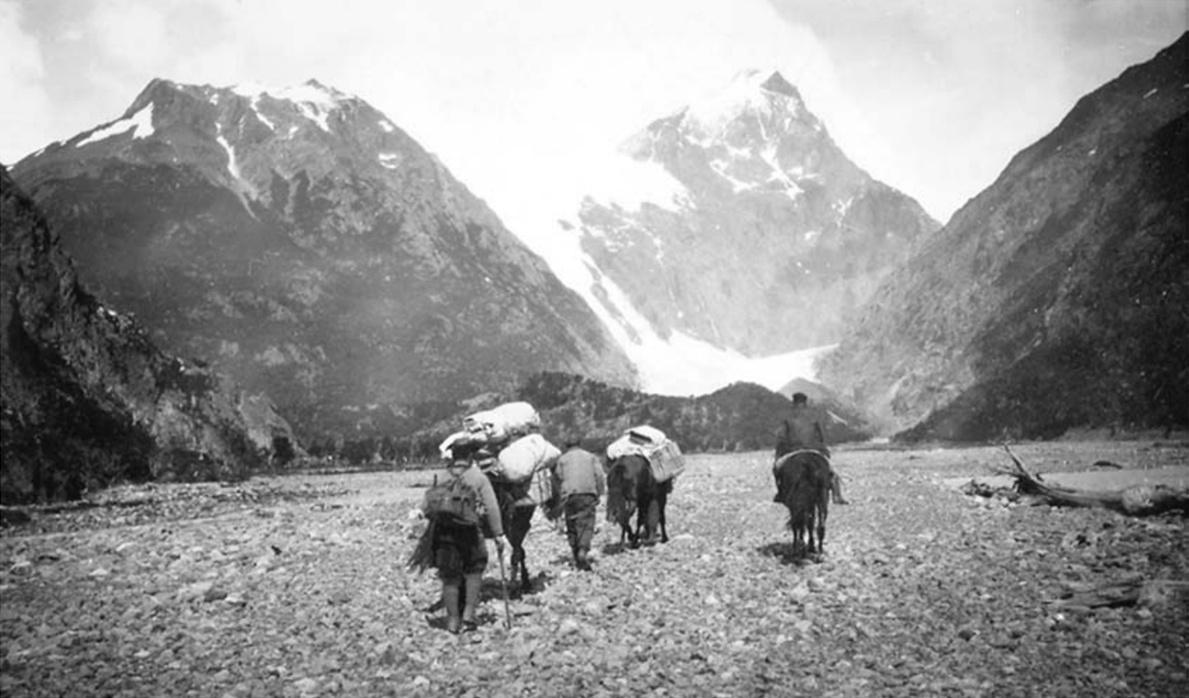
Cerro Campana seen from the Moyano Valley.

After the signing of the 1881 Treaty between Argentina and Chile, the boundary in the area was defined in 1898 by the boundary surveyors, Francisco Pascasio Moreno from Argentina and Diego Barros Arana from Chile. Huemul was declared a border landmark. The surveyors had no differences in the area between Mount Fitz Roy and Cerro Stokes, unlike other territories that were subject to arbitration in the 1902 arbitral award. The boundary was defined by the following mountain landmarks and their natural continuity: Mount Fitz Roy, Torre, Huemul, Campana, Agassiz, Heim, Mayo, and Stokes (nowadays Cervantes). Chile has defended it as a border landmark.

In 1998, the "Agreement between the Republic of Chile and the Republic of Argentina to determine the boundary line from Mount Fitz Roy to Cerro Daudet" was signed, defining section A and a small part of section B, with the area between Fitz Roy and the Murallón still pending.
