= Cerro Murallón =

Mountain in Chile and Argentina

- Cerro Murallón (in 2003)

Highest point
- Elevation: 2,656 m (8,714 ft)
- Coordinates: 49°47′53″S 73°25′34″W

Geography
- Location within Southern Patagonia
- Location: Argentina and Chile
- Parent range: Andes

Cerro Murallón is a glacier mountain of the Andes, in Patagonia, located on the eastern edge of the Southern Patagonian Ice Field, southwest of Lake Viedma, at the border between Chile and Argentina.

On the Argentine side, the hill has been part of the Los Glaciares National Park since 1937, in the Lago Argentino Department in the Santa Cruz Province, which was declared a World Heritage Site by UNESCO in 1981. On the Chilean side, it has been part of the Bernardo O'Higgins National Park, since 1969, in the commune of Natales in the Última Esperanza Province in the Magallanes and Chilean Antarctica Region. According to some sources its height is 2,656 meters (8,714 ft) above sea level, and according to others it is 2,831 meters (9,288 ft) above sea level.

== Toponymy ==
Cerro Murallón is named for its immense granite wall it presents. Cerro Murallón was photographed for the first time by the Salesian missionary Alberto María de Agostini in 1949, and its first ascent was made by Eduardo García, Cedomir Marangunic, Eric Shipton and Jack Ewer on January 24, 1961, on its west face. The first climb to the northeast wall was made in 1984 by the Italians Carlo Alde, Casimiro Ferrari and Paolo Vitali.

See also:

Cerro Murallón del Viedma, Cerro Huemul and Cerro Grande (in Fitz Roy massif)
