= Cerro Heim =

Mountain in Argentinian Patagonia close to Chile

Coordinates: 50°09′49″S 73°22′13″W

- Location within Southern Patagonia

Highest point
- Elevation: 2,521 m (8,271 ft)

Geography
- Location: Southern Patagonian Ice Field
- Country: Argentina

Cerro Heim is a mountain in the Southern Patagonian Ice Field. It is located in Santa Cruz Province, Argentina, and is part of Los Glaciares National Park. Prior to the 1998 agreement between Argentina and Chile, this hill was considered a border landmark by Chile and was established as a landmark by the surveyors of both countries in the 1898 protocol. It stands at an altitude of 2,465 m (8,087 ft).

== History ==
After the signing of the 1881 Treaty between Argentina and Chile, the boundary in the area was defined in 1898 by the boundary surveyors, Francisco Pascasio Moreno from Argentina and Diego Barros Arana from Chile. Huemul was declared a border landmark. The surveyors had no differences in the area between Mount Fitz Roy and Cerro Stokes, unlike other territories that were subject to arbitration in the 1902 arbitral award. The boundary was defined by the following mountain landmarks and their natural continuity: Mount Fitz Roy, Torre, Huemul, Campana, Agassiz, Heim, Mayo, and Stokes (nowadays Cervantes).

In 1998, the "Agreement between the Republic of Chile and the Republic of Argentina to determine the boundary line from Mount Fitz Roy to Cerro Daudet" was signed, defining section A and a small part of section B, with the area between Fitz Roy and the Murallón still pending.
