= Cerro Agassiz =

Mountain in Argentina and Chile

- Location within Southern Patagonia

Highest point
- Elevation: 3,177 m (10,423 ft)
- Coordinates: 49°57′39.90208″S 73°27′4.86976″W

Naming
- Etymology: Named after Swiss glaciologist Louis Agassiz

Geography
- Location: Southern Patagonian Ice Field
- Countries: Argentina; Chile
- Region: Patagonia
- Parent range: Andes

Cerro Agassiz is a mountain in the Andes, located on the border between Argentina and Chile, in the Patagonia region. It stands at an elevation of 3,177 meters.

On the Argentine side, the mountain is part of Los Glaciares National Park in Santa Cruz Province. On the Chilean side, it is part of Bernardo O'Higgins National Park in the Magallanes and Chilean Antarctic Region.

In 1898, the expert Francisco Moreno identified the mountain as Agassiz according to a study conducted by glaciologist Cedomir Marangunic, which takes as reference a photo of the mountain in Moreno's book called "Argentine-Chilean Border - Volume II". In some maps, the current Cerro Tomek (2940 meters in Lliboutry's map), or Roma (3270 meters in Lliboutry's map) or Agassiz Sur as Agassiz.

Alberto María de Agostini thought that the mountain was Cerro Bertrand; however, according to Marangunic, the historic Cerro Bertrand is Cerro Oasis/Agassiz Sur.

== Etymology ==
The mountain was named in honor of Swiss glaciologist Louis Agassiz.

== History ==
After the signing of the 1881 Treaty between Argentina and Chile, the border in the area was defined in 1899 by demarcation experts, Francisco Pascasio Moreno from Argentina and Diego Barros Arana from Chile. The Huemul was declared a boundary marker. The experts had no disagreements between Mount Fitz Roy and Cerro Stokes, unlike other territories that were submitted to arbitration in the 1902 award. The boundary was defined over the following mountain markers and their natural continuity: Fitz Roy, Torre, Huemul, Campana, Agassiz, Heim, Mayo, and Stokes.

In 1998, the "Agreement between the Republic of Chile and the Republic of Argentina to define the boundary between Monte Fitz-Roy and Cerro Daudet" was signed, establishing Section A and part of Section B, leaving the area between Fitz Roy and Murallón pending.
