= Cerro Cervantes =

Mountain in Argentina

Coordinates: 50°34′17″S 73°08′45″W

- Location within Southern Patagonia

Highest point
- Elevation: 2,380 m (7,810 ft)

Naming
- Etymology: Miguel de Cervantes
- Nickname: Cerro Stokes (1898)

Geography
- Location: Southern Patagonian Ice Field
- Country: Argentina

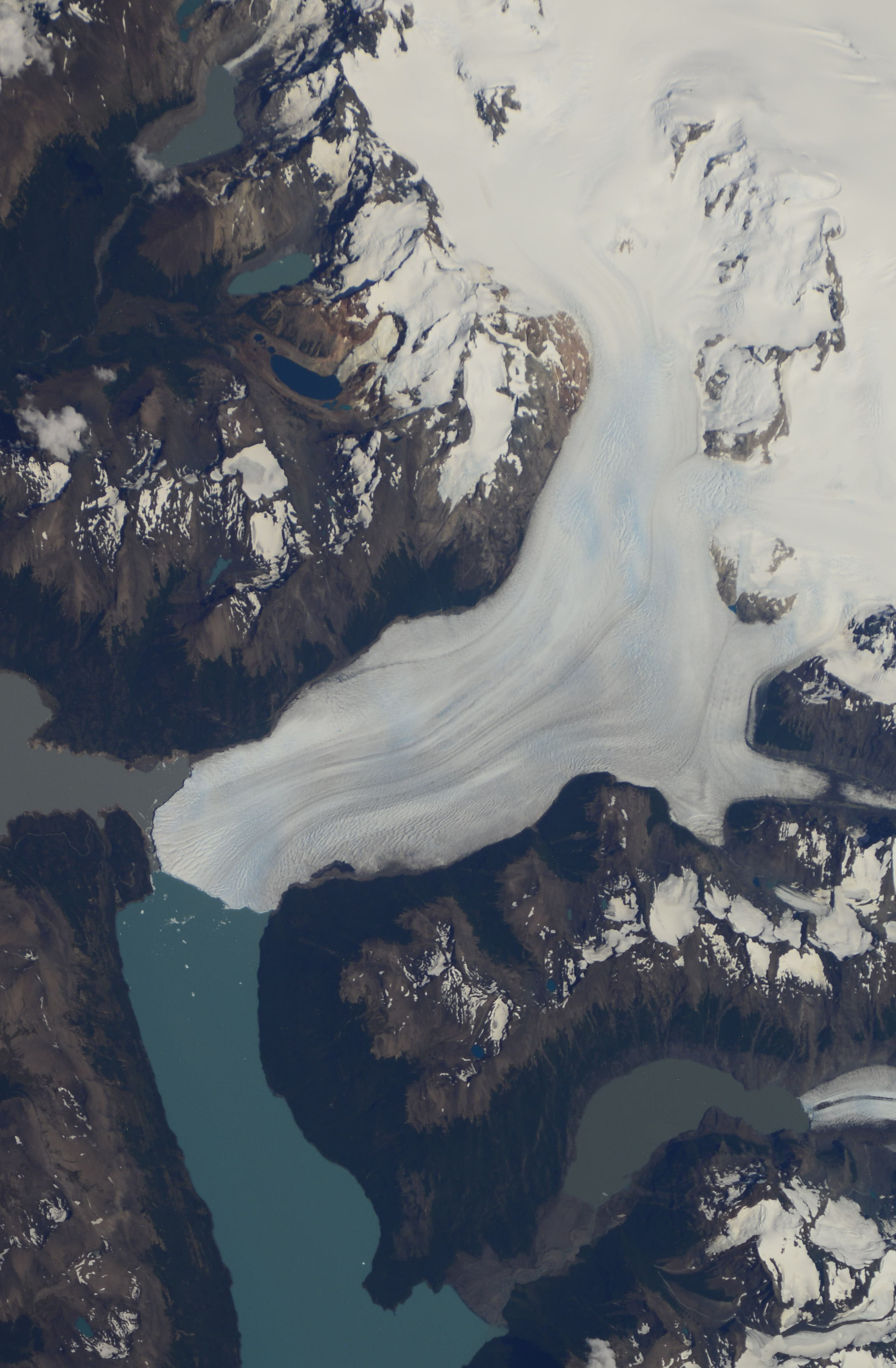
Cerro Cervantes and Perito Moreno Glacier

The Cerro Cervantes is a mountain in the Southern Patagonian Ice Field with an elevation of 2,380 meters above sea level or 680 meters above the surrounding terrain. Its foothills are about 5.6 kilometers wide. It is located in Santa Cruz Province, Argentina, and is part of Los Glaciares National Park. Before the 1998 agreement between Argentina and Chile, this mountain was considered a border landmark by Chile.

The terrain around Cerro Cervantes is mountainous to the east, but to the west, it is also mountainous. The highest area in the region has an elevation of 2,773 meters and is located 10.7 km south of Cerro Cervantes. Fewer than 2 people per square kilometer live around Cerro Cervantes. There are no settlements nearby.

Cerro Cervantes is almost entirely covered by ice. The climate is arctic. The average temperature is -9 °C. The warmest month is December, at -5 °C, and the coldest month is July, at -14 °C.

In 1898, the mountain was understood by the surveyors of Argentina and Chile as Cerro Stokes. The original Cerro Stokes from Fitz Roy's expedition is the current Cerro Mitre. In the 1998 agreement, another mountain was understood as Stokes.

== Etymology ==
It is named after the Spanish intellectual Miguel de Cervantes.

== History ==
After the signing of the 1881 Treaty between Argentina and Chile, the boundary in the area was defined in 1898 by the boundary surveyors, Francisco Pascasio Moreno from Argentina and Diego Barros Arana from Chile. Huemul was declared a border landmark. The surveyors had no differences in the area between Mount Fitz Roy and Cerro Stokes, unlike other territories that were subject to arbitration in the 1902 arbitral award. The boundary was defined by the following mountain landmarks and their natural continuity: Mount Fitz Roy, Torre, Huemul, Campana, Agassiz, Heim, Mayo, and Stokes (nowadays Cervantes).

In 1998, the "Agreement between the Republic of Chile and the Republic of Argentina to determine the boundary line from Mount Fitz Roy to Cerro Daudet" was signed, defining section A and a small part of section B, with the area between Fitz Roy and the Murallón still pending.
