= María Teresa Infante Caffi =

Chilean diplomat

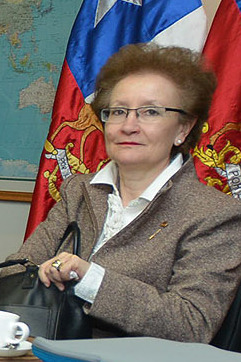
Official portrait of María Teresa Infante

María Teresa Infante Caffi (Recoleta, September 21, 1950) is a Chilean judge at the International Tribunal for the Law of the Sea. She is a diplomat and previously served as Chile's Ambassador to the Netherlands.

Throughout her career she has held different positions at the national level and abroad. She was co-counsel of Chile before the International Court of Justice (ICJ) of The Hague in the Peru-Chile case, National Director of Borders and Limits of Chile, and she was part of a group of 35 experts who advised Chile on lawsuit by Bolivia before the ICJ.

== Biography ==
Infante is a lawyer educated at the University of Chile. She obtained a doctorate at the Graduate Institute of International Studies of Geneva in 1979.

She was a tenured professor at the University of Chile, and she also taught at the Diplomatic Academy. She was also director of the Institute of International Studies of the University of Chile and has been a member of various international law organizations.

She was a promoter of the controversial 1998 agreement regarding the Southern Patagonian Ice Field dispute which sought to redraw the boundary already defined 100 years ago by the surveyors of both countries, together with José Miguel Insulza. In 2006, in the context of the controversy over the Argentine maps showing the border in the Southern Patagonian Ice Field, she downplayed the issue and stated that it was due to an "outdated version," a position that remained unchanged over the years.

Infante was in charge of Chile's legal and technical coordination in Peru's lawsuit for maritime boundaries, filed on July 9, 2009, and co-representative of Chile before the International Court of Justice (ICJ) in this Peru-Chile case.

Infante served as National Director of Borders and Limits of Chile, as part of the Ministry of Foreign Affairs.

In 2020, she was elected as a judge of the International Tribunal for the Law of the Sea.

== Publications ==
=== Books ===
- María Teresa Infante Caffi (2005). Modalidades de Integración en América Latina, París: Association Andrés Bello des Juristes Franco-Latino-Américains.
- María Teresa Infante Caffi, Rose Cave Schörh (1995). Solución judicial de controversias: el Derecho Internacional ante los tribunales internacionales e internos. Instituto de Estudios Internacionales, Sociedad Chilena de Derecho Internacional.
- María Teresa Infante Caffi, Sara Inés Pimentel Hunt, Rodrigo Díaz Albónico (1992(. El medio ambiente en la minería. Instituto de Estudios Internacionales, Universidad de Chile.

=== Articles ===
- "Antártica ante el Derecho Internacional". Audiovisual Library of International Law of the United Nations
