= Tres Lagos =

- Municipality and village
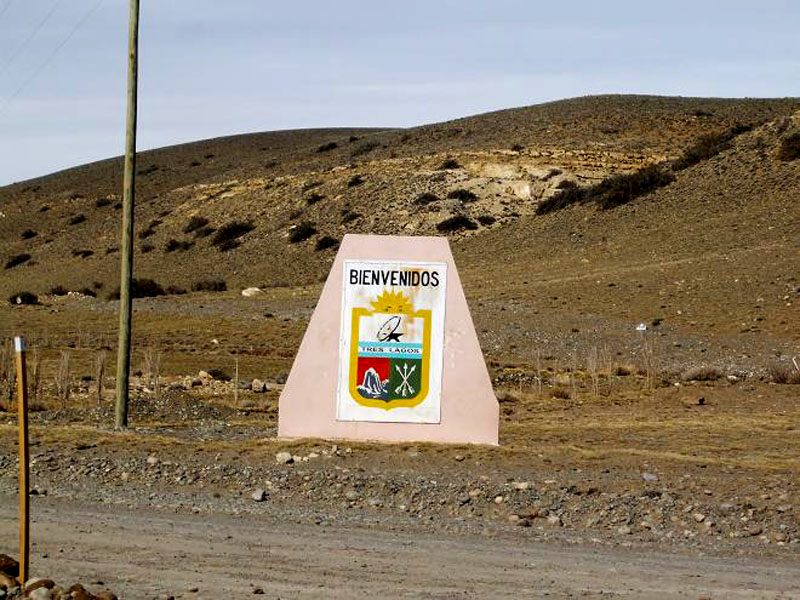

- Location within Argentina
- Coordinates: 49°37′S 71°30′W
- Country: Argentina
- Province: Santa Cruz Province
- Department: Lago Argentino
- Time zone: UTC−3 (ART)
- Climate: BSk

Tres Lagos is a village and municipality in Lago Argentino Department of Santa Cruz Province in southern Patagonia, Argentina.

== Popular culture ==
The village featured in Top Gear in which Jeremy Clarkson and Richard Hammond head off in search of some bolt cutters after coming across a locked fence. It is also featured briefly in Long Way Up where the expedition makes an overnight stop.
