= Cerro Mayo =

Mountain in Patagonia

Coordinates: 50°20′08″S 73°19′05″W

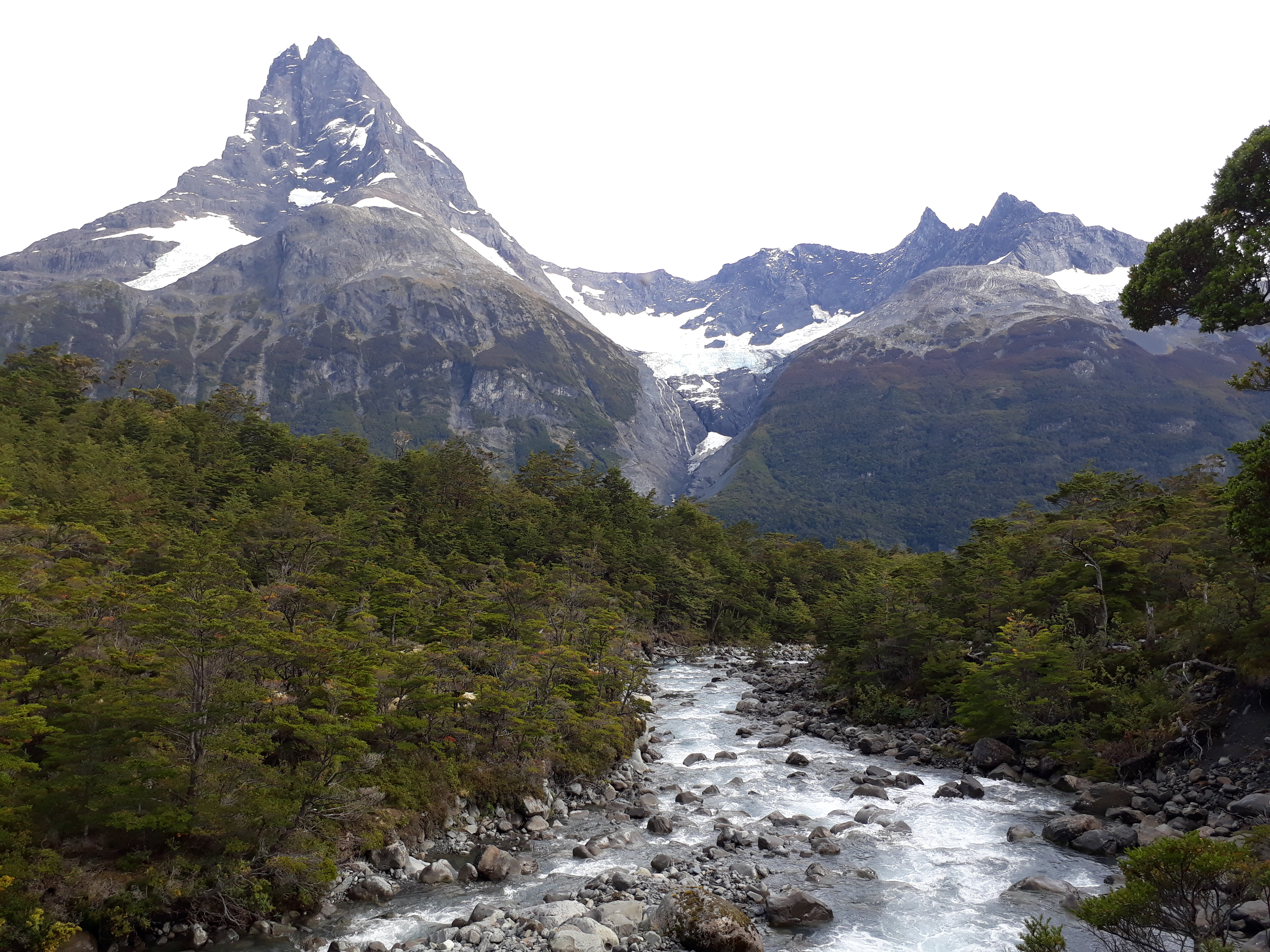
- Cerro Mayo.

Highest point
- Elevation: 1,816 m (5,958 ft)

Geography
- Location within Southern Patagonia
- Location: Southern Patagonian Ice Field
- Country: Argentina

Cerro Mayo or de Mayo is a mountain in the Southern Patagonian Ice Field, in Santa Cruz Province, Argentina. It is part of Los Glaciares National Park. Prior to the 1998 agreement between Argentina and Chile, this hill was considered a border landmark by Chile and was established as a landmark by the surveyors of both countries in the 1898 protocol.

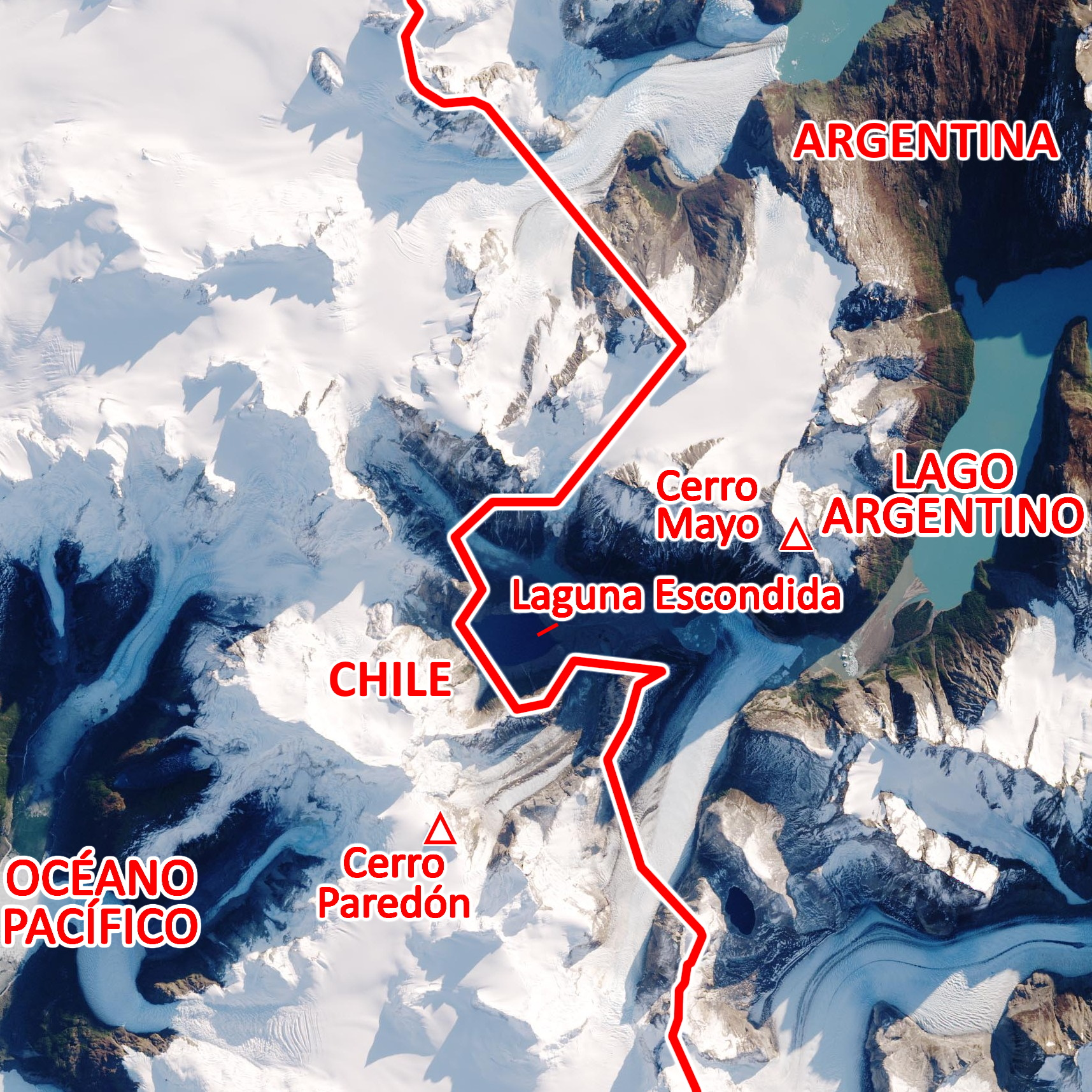
Cerro Mayo near the Argentina-Chile border in the Southern Patagonian Ice Field.

Nearby is the Mayo Glacier, which is accessible from the Mayo Bay of Lake Argentino and the Cerro Negro.

== History ==
After the signing of the 1881 Treaty between Argentina and Chile, the boundary in the area was defined in 1898 by the boundary surveyors, Francisco Pascasio Moreno from Argentina and Diego Barros Arana from Chile. Huemul was declared a border landmark. The surveyors had no differences in the area between Mount Fitz Roy and Cerro Stokes, unlike other territories that were subject to arbitration in the 1902 arbitral award. The boundary was defined by the following mountain landmarks and their natural continuity: Mount Fitz Roy, Torre, Huemul, Campana, Agassiz, Heim, Mayo, and Stokes (nowadays Cervantes).

On occasion, Mount Stokes has appeared on maps near the location of Cerro Mayo, leading some authors to postulate that Mayo is the Stokes identified by experts in 1898. However, according to a study by glaciologist Cedomir Marangunic, it is Cerro Cervantes that was identified as such. The original Stokes from the 1834 Fitz Roy expedition is nowadays Cerro Mitre. The geographical location of Stokes has varied on maps over time.

In 1998, the "Agreement between the Republic of Chile and the Republic of Argentina to determine the boundary line from Mount Fitz Roy to Cerro Daudet" was signed, defining section A and a small part of section B, with the area between Fitz Roy and the Murallón still pending.
