= Liolaemus morenoi =

Conservation status
- Vulnerable (IUCN 3.1)

Scientific classification
- Kingdom: Animalia
- Phylum: Chordata
- Class: Reptilia
- Order: Squamata
- Suborder: Iguania
- Family: Liolaemidae
- Genus: Liolaemus
- Species: L. morenoi

Binomial name
- Liolaemus morenoi Etheridge & Christie, 2003

Species of lizard

Liolaemus morenoi is a species of lizard in the family Liolaemidae. The species is endemic to Argentina.

== Etymology ==
The specific name, morenoi, is in honor of Argentinian zoologist Francisco Josue Pascasio Moreno (1852–1919).

== Geographic distribution ==
Liolaemus morenoi is found in western Argentina, in Neuquén Province.

== Habitat ==
The preferred natural habitats of Liolaemus morenoi are sand dunes, grassland, and shrubland, at elevations of 550–700 m (1,800–2,300 ft).

== Behavior ==
Liolaemus morenoi is terrestrial.

== Diet ==
Liolaemus morenoi preys predominately upon insects.

== Reproduction ==
Liolaemus morenoi is oviparous.
