= Cerro Huemul =

Mountain in the disputed area between Argentina and Chile

Coordinates: 49°25′25″S 73°02′05″W

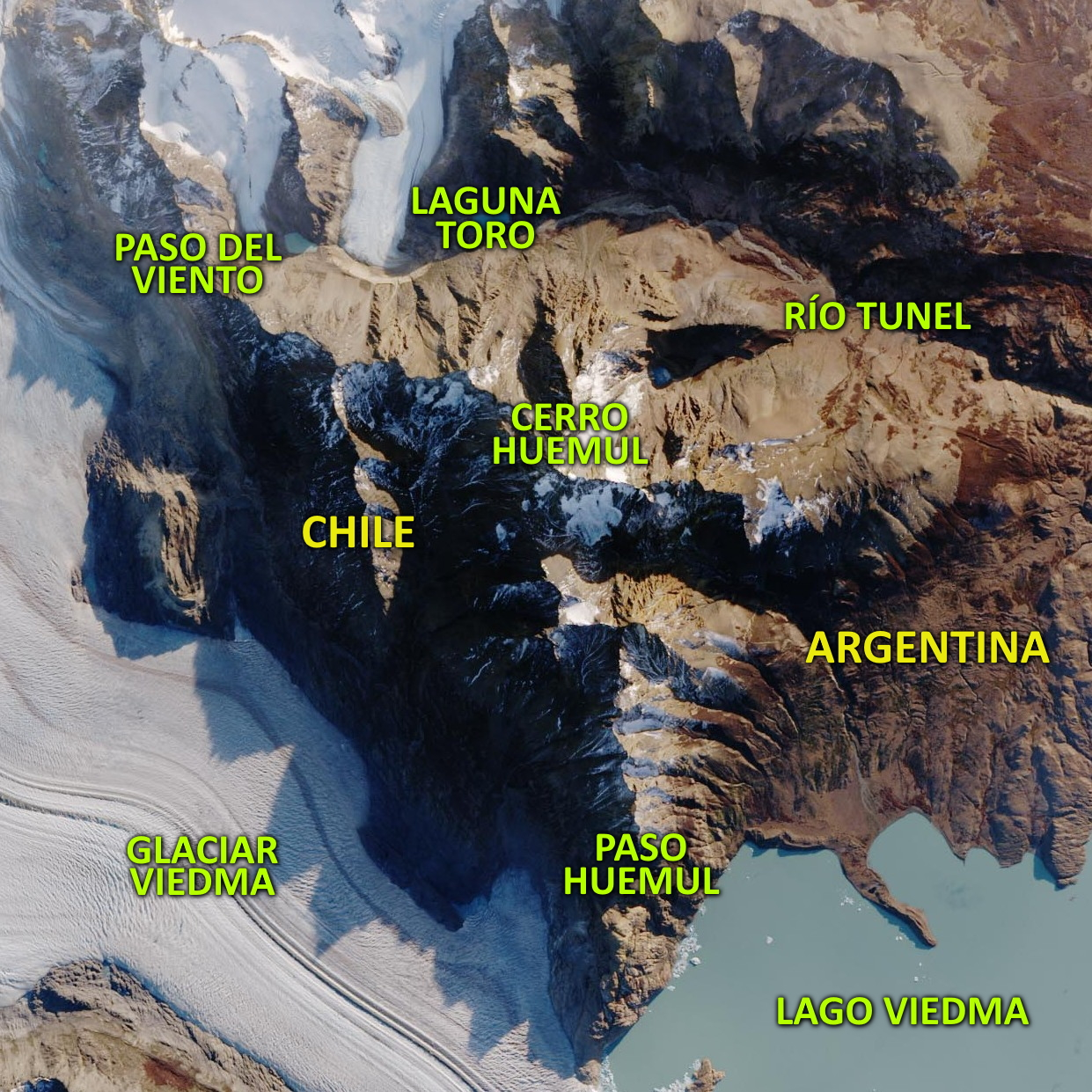
- Cerro Huemul in the Southern Patagonian Ice Field.

Highest point
- Elevation: 2,677 m (8,783 ft)

Naming
- Etymology: South Andean deer (Huemul)

Geography
- Location within Southern Patagonia
- Location: Located in the disputed area between Argentina and Chile in the Southern Patagonian Ice Field.
- Countries: Argentina; Chile
- Parent range: Andes

The Cerro Huemul is a glaciated mountain in the Andes located on the eastern edge of the Southern Patagonian Ice Field, west of Lake Viedma and north of the Viedma Glacier within the disputed area between Chile and Argentina.

For Argentina, the hill has been part of Los Glaciares National Park in the Lago Argentino Department, Santa Cruz Province, since 1937, and was declared a World Heritage Site by UNESCO in 1981. For Chile, its western side has been part of Bernardo O'Higgins National Park since 1969, in the Natales commune, Última Esperanza Province, Magallanes and Chilean Antarctic Region. Its elevation is 2,677 m (8,783 ft).

It can be accessed via a circuit from the Argentine town of El Chaltén, with the Huemul Pass and Del Viento Pass located nearby.

== History ==
After the signing of the 1881 Treaty between Argentina and Chile, the boundary in the area was defined in 1898 by the boundary surveyors, Francisco Pascasio Moreno from Argentina and Diego Barros Arana from Chile. Huemul was declared a border landmark. The surveyors had no differences in the area between Mount Fitz Roy and Cerro Stokes, unlike other territories that were subject to arbitration in the 1902 arbitral award. The boundary was defined by the following mountain landmarks and their natural continuity: Mount Fitz Roy, Torre, Huemul, Campana, Agassiz, Heim, Mayo, and Stokes (nowadays Cervantes). Chile has defended it as a border landmark.

In 1998, the "Agreement between the Republic of Chile and the Republic of Argentina to determine the boundary line from Mount Fitz Roy to Cerro Daudet" was signed, defining section A and a small part of section B, with the area between Fitz Roy and the Murallón still pending.
