= Cerro Torre =

Mountain in Southern Patagonia in South America

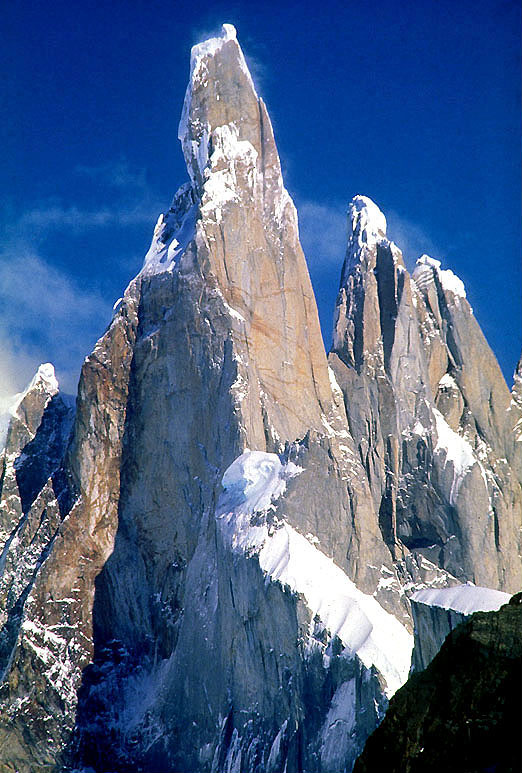
- Cerro Torre in 1987

Highest point
- Elevation: 3,128 m (10,262 ft)
- Prominence: 1,227 m (4,026 ft)

Geography
- Location within Southern Patagonia
- Location: Patagonia, Argentina
- Country: Argentina
- Parent range: Andes

Climbing
- First ascent: 1974 by Daniele Chiappa, Mario Conti, Casimiro Ferrari and Pino Negri (Italy)
- Easiest route: rock/snow/ice

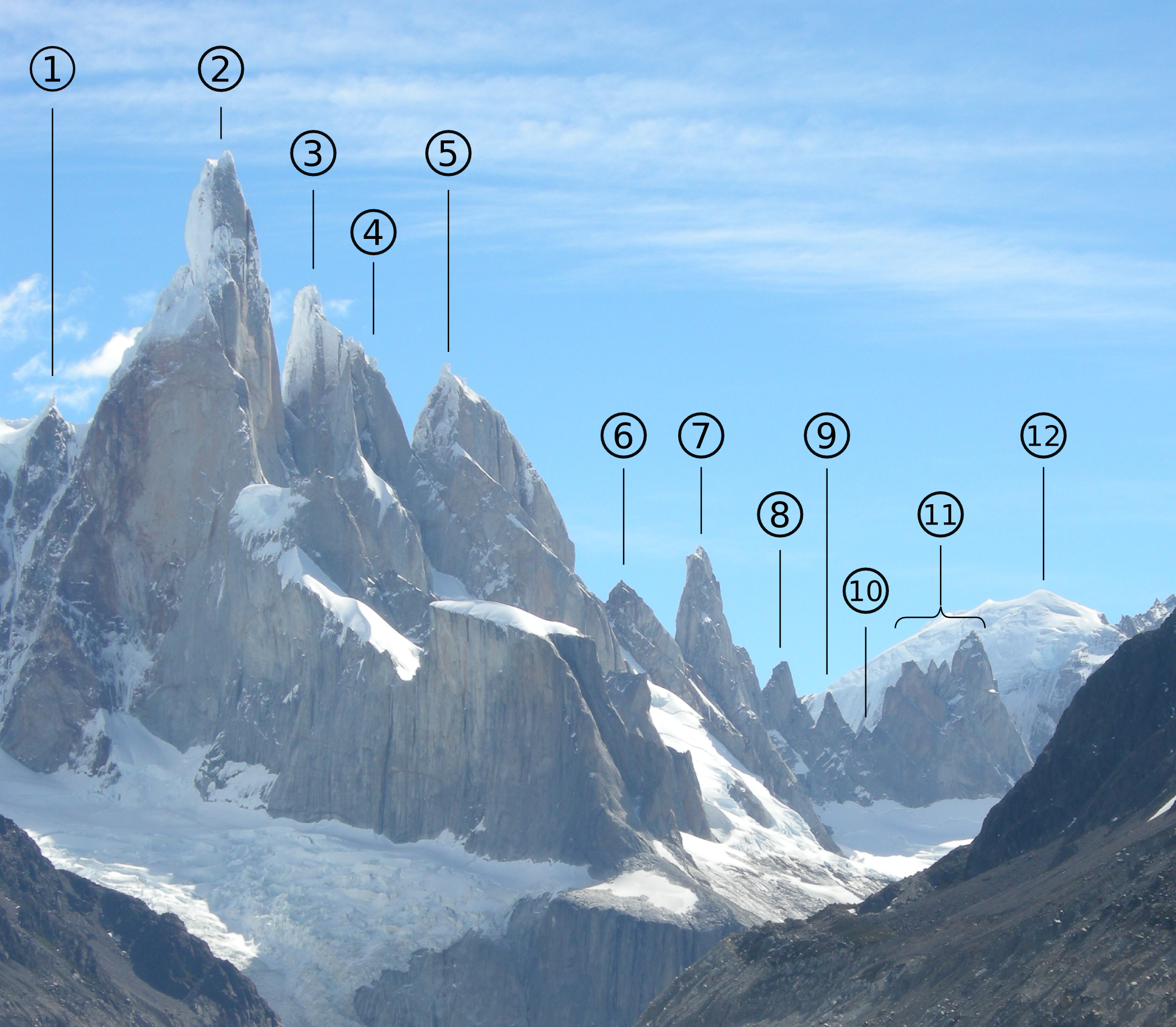
Some peaks of the Cerro Torre Group. 2: Cerro Torre, 3: Torre Egger, 4: Punta Herron, 5: Aguja Standhart, 7: Aguja Bífida, 11: Cuatro Dedos

Cerro Torre is one of the mountains of the Southern Patagonian Ice Field in South America. It is located on the border dividing Argentina and Chile, west of Fitz Roy (also known as Cerro Chaltén). At 3,128 m (10,262 ft), the peak is the highest of a four mountain chain: the other peaks are Torre Egger (2,685 m (8,809 ft)), Punta Herron, and Cerro Standhardt. The top of the mountain often has a mushroom of rime ice, formed by the constant strong winds, increasing the difficulty of reaching the actual summit.

== First ascent ==
Cesare Maestri claimed in 1959 that he and Toni Egger had reached the summit and that Egger had been swept to his death by an avalanche while they were descending. Maestri declared that Egger had the camera with the pictures of the summit, but this camera was never found. Inconsistencies in Maestri's account, and the lack of bolts, pitons or fixed ropes on the route, have led most mountaineers to doubt Maestri's claim. In 2005, Ermanno Salvaterra, Rolando Garibotti and Alessandro Beltrami, after many attempts by world-class alpinists, put up a confirmed route on the face that Maestri claimed to have climbed. They did not find any evidence of previous climbing on the route described by Maestri and found the route significantly different from Maestri's description.

Maestri went back to Cerro Torre in 1970 with Ezio Alimonta, Daniele Angeli, Claudio Baldessarri, Carlo Claus and Pietro Vidi, trying a new route on the southeast face. With the aid of a gas-powered compressor drill, Maestri equipped 350 metres (1,150 ft) of rock with bolts and got to the end of the rocky part of the mountain, just below the ice mushroom. Maestri claimed that "the mushroom is not part of the mountain" and did not continue to the summit. The compressor was left, tied to the last bolts, 100 m (330 ft) below the top. Maestri was heavily criticized for the "unfair" methods he used to climb the mountain.

The route Maestri followed is now known as the Compressor route and was climbed to the summit in 1979 by Jim Bridwell and Steve Brewer. Most parties consider the ascent complete only if they summit the often-difficult ice-rime mushroom.

The first undisputed ascent was made in 1974 by the "Ragni di Lecco" climbers Daniele Chiappa, Mario Conti, Casimiro Ferrari, and Pino Negri. The controversies regarding Maestri's claims are the focus of the 2014 book on Cerro Torre, The Tower, by Kelly Cordes.

== Subsequent ascents ==
In 1977, the first Alpine style ascent was completed by Dave Carman, John Bragg and Jay Wilson (USA). They took a week to summit Cerro Torre, which had taken the Italian group two months to summit. In 1980, Bill Denz (New Zealand) attempted the first solo of the Compressor Route. Over a five-month period, he made 13 concerted attempts but was driven back by storms on every occasion. On his last attempt, in November 1980, he got to within 60 metres (200 ft) of the summit.

In January 2008, Rolando Garibotti and Colin Haley made the first complete traverse of the entire massif, climbing Aguja Standhardt, Punta Herron, Torre Egger and Cerro Torre together. They rate their route at Grade VI 5.11 A1 WI6 Mushroom Ice 6, with 2,200 m (7,200 ft) total vertical gain. This had been "one of the world's most iconic, unclimbed lines", first attempted by Ermanno Salvaterra.

In 2010, Austrian climber David Lama was held responsible for around 30 new bolts and hundreds of meters of fixed rope added to the Compressor Route on the mountain (due to bad weather conditions, much of the gear was left on the mountain and later removed by local climbers). Although the bolts were drilled by Austrian guide Markus Pucher, and not by Lama himself, it was done as part of his trip sponsored by Red Bull, and many climbers regard Lama and Red Bull as responsible. Many of the bolts were drilled next to cracks, which are usually used by climbers for protection on the route. This has caused a large controversy in certain climbers' circles, as his actions are unethical according to climbing purists. Although Lama was not aware of the sheer number of bolts that were drilled, he took full responsibility for the actions. In the upcoming years, he publicly regretted what happened.

On 16 January 2012, American Hayden Kennedy and Canadian Jason Kruk made the first "fair-means" (a term used to describe a reasonable use of bolts for safety and aesthetics, "a long-accepted practice in [the Patagonian] mountain range") ascent of the Southeast Ridge, near the controversial Compressor Route, using only two of Maestri's original belay anchors on the headwall. After summiting, Kennedy and Kruk removed 125 of the bolt-ladder bolts during their descent. Colin Haley, who watched the ascent from Norwegos, estimated the climb took them thirteen hours from their bivy on the shoulder to the summit. "The speed with which they navigated virgin ground on the upper headwall is certainly testament to Hayden's great skills on rock", Haley reported. There has been much discussion concerning the removal of bolts from the compressor route by Kennedy and Kruk. However, the consensus amongst the climbing community is that of agreement for removing the bolts and it has embraced their actions as having "restored Cerro Torre's southeast ridge to the realm of genuine adventure".

In contrast to David Lama's free ascent (also "fair-means"; January 2012, together with Peter Ortner), Kennedy and Kruk used bolts, although not Maestri's, during their ascent. Lama estimated the difficulties of his free ascent, which followed a new line circumventing the bolt traverse and in the upper headwall, as grade X− (hard 8a but mentally highly demanding; e.g., climbing on loose flakes, long runouts). Lama stated that a free repetition of the original Compressor Route is virtually impossible, in particular as the rock of the last pitches comprise no climbable features.

== Notable ascents and attempts ==
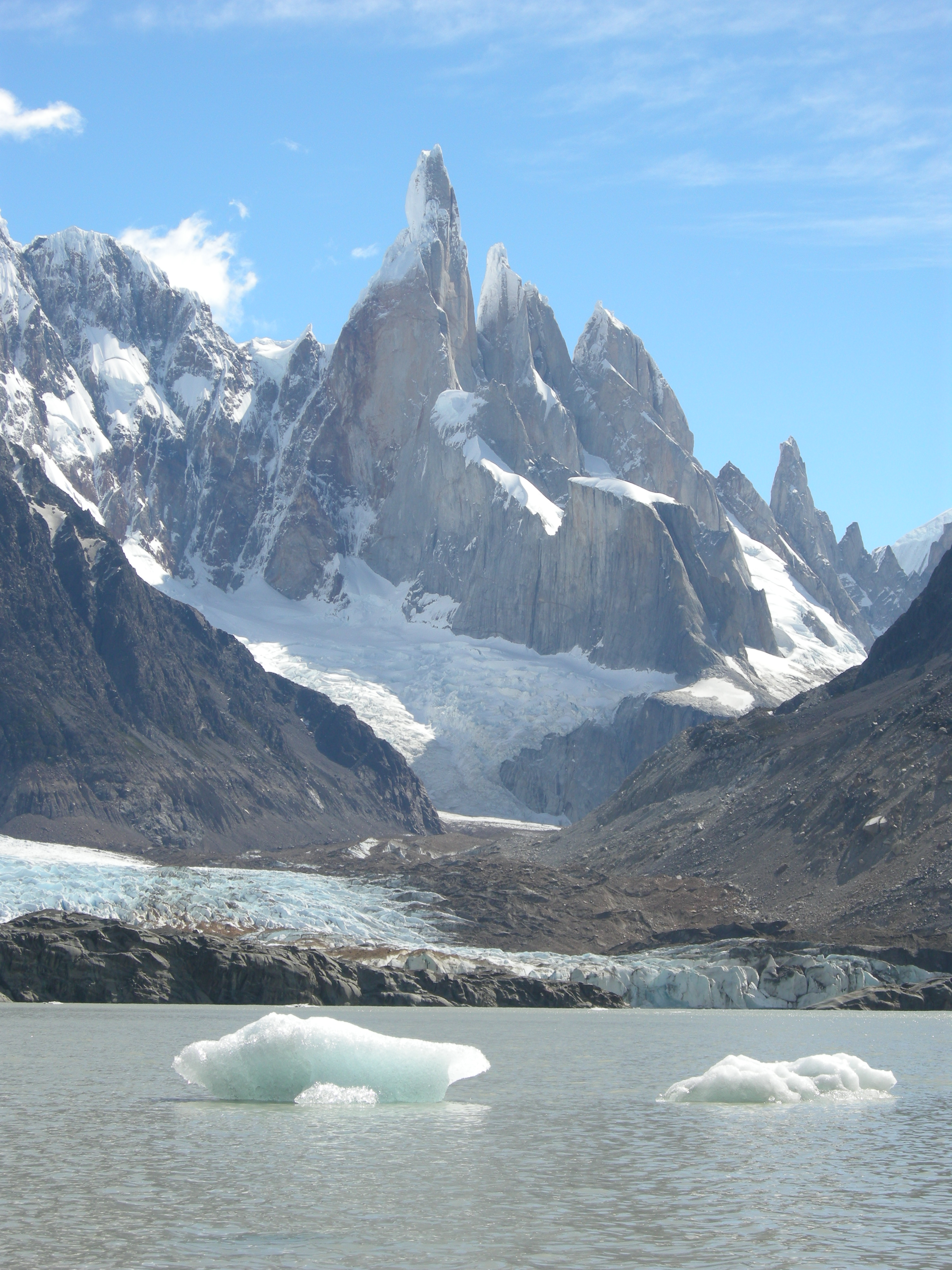
Cerro Torre (east face), Torre glacier and Laguna Torre, 2010

- 1959 – Cesare Maestri (Italy) and Toni Egger (Austria) - Unsuccessful attempt of North Face. Egger died.
- 1970 – Maestri et al. (Italy), Compressor route to 60 meters below summit.
- 1973 – Keven Carroll (AUS) and Steven McAndrews (USA) West Face 5th ascent. Died on descent from rock fall. Earlier seen on summit ridge.
- 1974 – Daniele Chiappa, Mario Conti, Casimiro Ferrari and Pino Negri (Italy). First undisputed ascent.
- 1977 – Dave Carman, John Bragg and Jay Wilson (USA). First Alpine-style ascent.
- 1979 – Jim Bridwell and Steve Brewer complete climb of Compressor Route.
- 1981 - Tom Proctor and Phil Burke (England). Diedre, East Face to North Face and retreat below cornices.
- 1985 July 3–8 First winter ascent by Paolo Caruso, Maurizio Giarolli and Ermanno Salvaterra (Italy).
- 1985 November 26 Compressor route - first solo by Marco Pedrini (Swiss). Filmed by Fulvio Mariani: Cerro Torre Cumbre.
- 2004 Five Years to Paradise (ED:VI 5.10b A2 95 deg, 1000 m) (right center on East Face): Ermanno Salvaterra, Alessandro Beltrami, and Giacomo Rossetti (all from Italy).
- 2006 January 22 – Krzysztof Belczynski and Marcin Tomaszewski made 2nd or 3rd ascent of "Compressor" route up to the summit in alpine style, 33 hours round trip from Norwegian shelter
- 2008 February 25 – Valery Rozov makes the first wingsuit BASE jump from Cerro Torre.
- 2012 January 16 – First 'fair means' ascent of the Southeast Ridge (5.11 A2), without using any of Cesare Maestri's bolts on the Compressor Route, by Hayden Kennedy and Jason Kruk.
- 2012 January 19 – First free ascent of the Southeast Ridge by a new variation, also without using any of Cesare Maestri's bolts on the Compressor Route, by David Lama; Lama and Ortner.
- 2013 February – First free solo of Cerro Torre by Austrian alpinist Markus Pucher.
- 2015 February 21 — Marc-André Leclerc, 22, soloed the 4,000-foot Corkscrew route (5.10d, A1) on Cerro Torre—the hardest route ever soloed on the granite tower—in a single day.
- 2020 February 7 – First climb and fly from the summit of Cerro Torre by German alpinist and paraglider Fabian Buhl.
- 2025 September 7 – First winter solo of Cerro Torre by American alpinist Colin Haley.

== History ==
After the signing of the 1881 Treaty between Argentina and Chile, the boundary in the area was defined in 1898 by the boundary surveyors, Francisco Pascasio Moreno from Argentina and Diego Barros Arana from Chile. Huemul was declared a border landmark. The surveyors had no differences in the area between Mount Fitz Roy and Cerro Stokes, unlike other territories that were subject to arbitration in the 1902 arbitral award. The boundary was defined by the following mountain landmarks and their natural continuity: Mount Fitz Roy, Torre, Huemul, Campana, Agassiz, Heim, Mayo, and Stokes (nowadays Cervantes). Chile has defended it as a border landmark.

In 1998, the "Agreement between the Republic of Chile and the Republic of Argentina to determine the boundary line from Mount Fitz Roy to Cerro Daudet" was signed, defining section A and a small part of section B, with the area between Fitz Roy and the Murallón still pending.

== In popular culture ==
Cerro Torre was featured in the 1991 film Scream of Stone, directed by Werner Herzog, from an idea by Reinhold Messner, and starring Vittorio Mezzogiorno, Stefan Glowacz, and Donald Sutherland.

Jon Krakauer mentions it briefly in Into Thin Air as one of his earlier difficult ascents (1992): "I'd scaled a frightening, mile-high spike of vertical and overhanging granite called Cerro Torre; buffeted by hundred-knot winds, plastered with frangible atmospheric rime, it was once (though no longer) thought to be the world's hardest mountain".

In March 2014, an adventure documentary was released following the "first ever free ascent" of Cerro Torre, featuring David Lama. Cerro Torre - A Snowball's Chance in Hell premiered at San Sebastián International Film Festival in September 2013.

Cerro Torre acts as the main setting for season 3 and 4 of the horror audiodrama The White Vault.
