= Fitz Roy =

Mountain in the Southern Andes; part of the Argentina-Chile border

Monte Fitz Roy
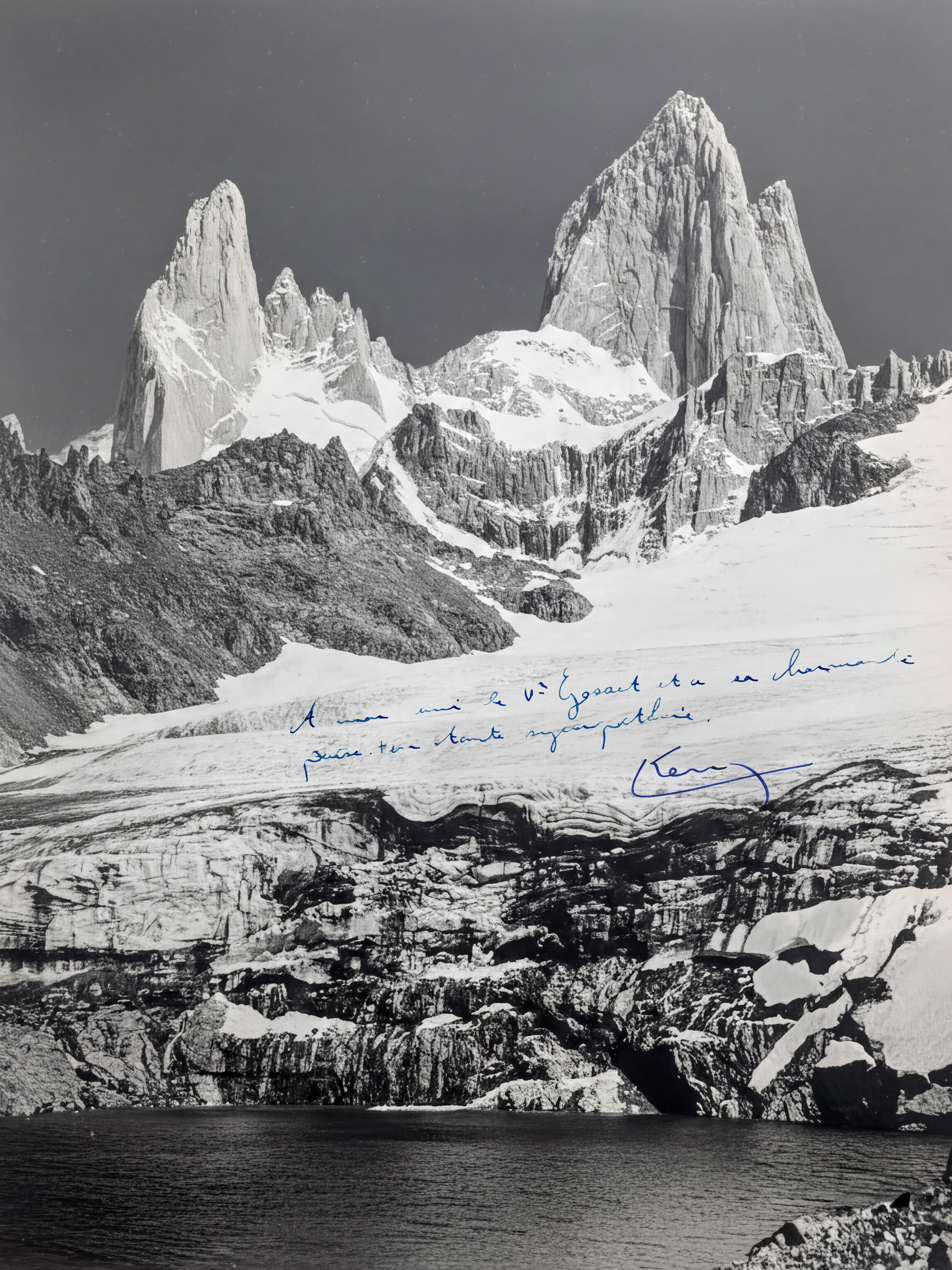
- Signed photograph of Mt Fitz Roy by Lionel Terray (Aguja Poincenot to left)

Highest point
- Elevation: 3,405 m (11,171 ft)
- Prominence: 1,951 m (6,401 ft)
- Listing: Ultra
- Coordinates: 49°16′16.6″S 73°02′35.6″W

Geography
- Location within Southern Patagonia
- Location: Patagonia, Argentina—Chile border
- Countries: Argentina; Chile
- Parent range: Andes

Geology
- Mountain type: Granite

Climbing
- First ascent: 1952 by Lionel Terray & Guido Magnone
- Easiest route: Franco Argentina (650m., 6a+, 6c/A1)

Monte Fitz Roy (also known as Cerro Chaltén, Cerro Fitz Roy, or simply Mount Fitz Roy) is a mountain in Patagonia, on the border between Argentina and Chile. It is located in the Southern Patagonian Ice Field, near El Chaltén village and Viedma Lake. It was first climbed in 1952 by French alpinists Lionel Terray and Guido Magnone.

== First European encounter ==
The first Europeans recorded as seeing Mount Fitz Roy were the Spanish explorer Antonio de Viedma and his companions, who reached the shores of Viedma Lake in 1783. Argentine explorer Francisco Moreno saw the mountain on 2 March 1877; he named it Fitz Roy in honour of Robert FitzRoy who, as captain of HMS Beagle, had travelled up the Santa Cruz River in 1834 and charted large parts of the Patagonian coast.

Cerro is a Spanish word meaning ridge or hill, while Chaltén comes from a Tehuelche (Aonikenk) word meaning "smoking mountain", because a cloud usually forms around the mountain's peak. Fitz Roy is one of several peaks the Tehuelche called Chaltén.

== Geography ==
Argentina and Chile have agreed that their international border detours eastwards to pass over the main summit, but a large part of the border to the south of the summit, as far as Cerro Murallón, remains undefined. The mountain is the symbol of the Argentine Santa Cruz Province, which includes its representation on its flag and its coat of arms.

On February 27, 2014, Chile's National Forestry Corporation created the Chaltén Mountain Range Natural Site by Resolution No. 74, which covers the Chilean side of Mount Fitz Roy and the surrounding mountain range.

== Notable ascents ==
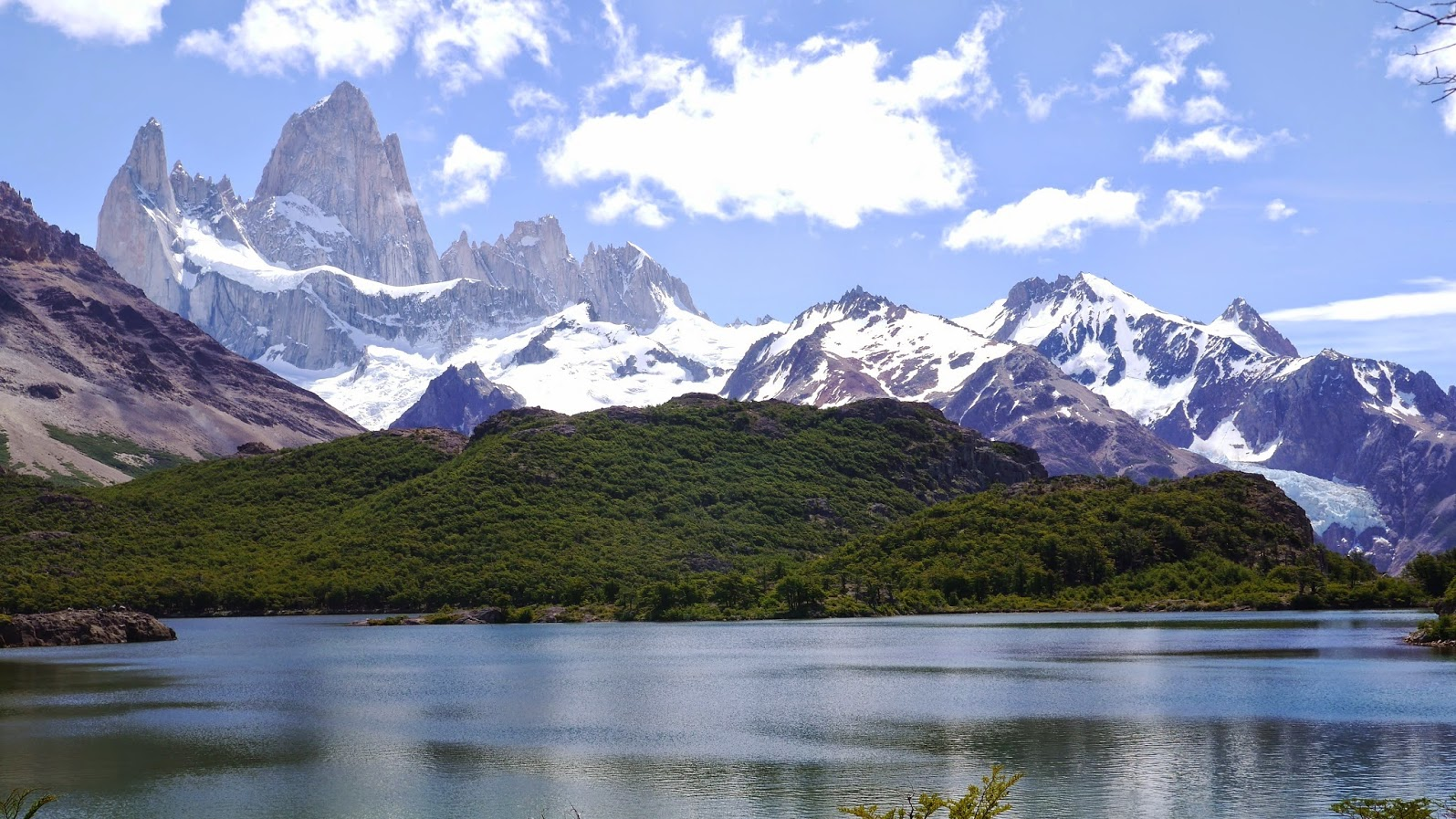
Fitz Roy and Lake Capri - Parque Nacional Los Glaciares

- 1952, Lionel Terray and Guido Magnone via Southeast Ridge (Franco-Argentine Ridge) (first ascent - 2 February 1952).
- 1965, Carlos Comesaña and José Luis Fonrouge (from Argentina) via Supercanaleta (1,600m, TD+ 5.10 90deg) in 2 1/2 days (second ascent).
- 1968, Southwest Ridge aka The Californian Route (third ascent). Ascent by the "Fun Hogs": Yvon Chouinard (who went on to found outdoor clothing and equipment company Patagonia and climbing equipment company Black Diamond Equipment), Dick Dorworth, Chris Jones, Lito Tejada-Flores (filmmaker, whose 16mm Bolex camera footage of the ascent was used for the film of the expedition entitled Mountain of Storms) and Douglas Tompkins (who, in 1964, had co-founded outdoor equipment and clothing company The North Face).
- 1972, Southeast Ridge (fourth ascent). Ian Wade (U.S.), Dave Nicol (UK), Mo Anthoine (UK), Guy Lee (UK), Larry Derby (U.S.) & Eddie Birch (UK).
- 1980, following the Col Americano route, Gino Casassa (Chile, monitor of the Andinism Federation of Chile) and Walter Bertsch (Austria) arrived at the peak together. Alejandro Izquierdo (Chilean) climbed to 2,800 m.
- 1983, First ascent of the west face: R. Gálfy, M. Orolin and V. Petrík, “Slovak Way”.
- 1984, Polaca Route (Polish Route) by Wiesław Burzyński, Miroław Falco Dąsal, Michał Kochańczyk, Jacek Kozaczkiewicz and Piotr Lutyński. Poland, 24/12/1984. 900m 6a A2. This route is still unrepeated.
- 1984, Franco Argentina Route by Marcos Couch, Eduardo Brenner, Alberto Bendinger, and Pedro Friedrich.
- 1986, First winter ascent, in July, by Argentines Eduardo Brenner, Sebastián De La Cruz and Gabriel Ruiz, over three days via Supercanaleta.
- 1990, First winter solo ascent, in July, by Yasushi Yamanoi.
- 2002, Dean Potter, first free solo, via Supercanaleta
- 2009, Colin Haley, solo via Supercanaleta
- 2009, Matthew McCarron, solo via The Californian Route
- 2014, Between 12 and 16 February, Tommy Caldwell and Alex Honnold completed the highly prized first full traverse, Fitz Roy Traverse, climbing across the ridge line of Fitz Roy and its satellite peaks. The route is 5 kilometers long and has approximately 4,000 meters of cumulative elevation gain, with technical climbing of up to 5.11d (7a). They were both awarded the Piolet d'Or for their climb.
- 2019, Jim Reynolds, free solo.
- 2021, Sean Villanueva O’Driscoll completed the second ascent and first solo ascent of the traverse but completed the route in reverse, which he called the Moonwalk Traverse. He was awarded a Piolet d'Or award in 2022.
- 2022, Colin Haley, first solo winter ascent of the Supercanaleta Route on Fitz Roy.

== History ==
After the signing of the 1881 Treaty between Argentina and Chile, the boundary in the area was defined in 1898 by the boundary surveyors, Francisco Pascasio Moreno from Argentina and Diego Barros Arana from Chile. Huemul was declared a border landmark. The surveyors had no differences in the area between Mount Fitz Roy and Cerro Stokes, unlike other territories that were subject to arbitration in the 1902 arbitral award. The boundary was defined by the following mountain landmarks and their natural continuity: Mount Fitz Roy, Torre, Huemul, Campana, Agassiz, Heim, Mayo, and Stokes (nowadays Cervantes). Chile has defended it as a border landmark.

In 1998, the "Agreement between the Republic of Chile and the Republic of Argentina to determine the boundary line from Mount Fitz Roy to Cerro Daudet" was signed, defining section A and a small part of section B, with the area between Fitz Roy and the Murallón still pending.

== Tourism ==
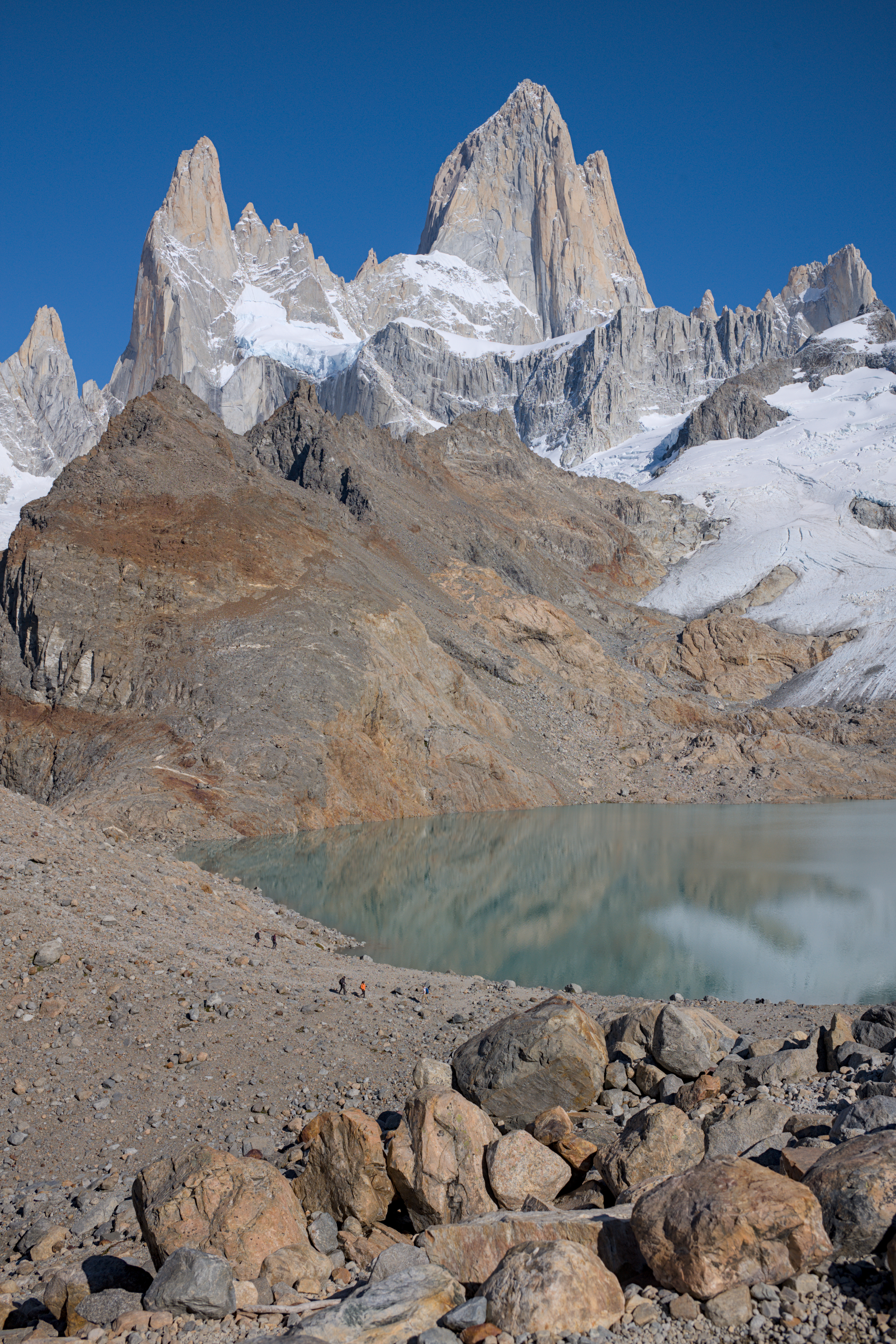
Mount Fitz Roy as seen from the Laguna de Los Tres

Fitz Roy is a popular tourist destination for hikers, as a viewpoint between the Laguna de Los Tres and the Laguna Sucia can be reached by foot from the town of El Chaltén. The total trek is around 20 kilometers for the round trip, making it possible to do the out-and-back hike within a single day, while also passing by the Poincenot campground that is run by a local association, for people who want to take more time.

== See also ==
- Chaltén Mountain Range Natural Site
- Villa O'Higgins
- Candelario Mancilla
- Del Desierto Lake
- Torres del Paine National Park
- Bernardo O'Higgins National Park
- Los Glaciares National Park
- Perito Moreno Glacier
- Cordillera del Paine
- O'Higgins/San Martín Lake
