= Lago Argentino Department =

Coordinates: 50°20′19″S 72°16′26″W

Lago Argentino
- Department
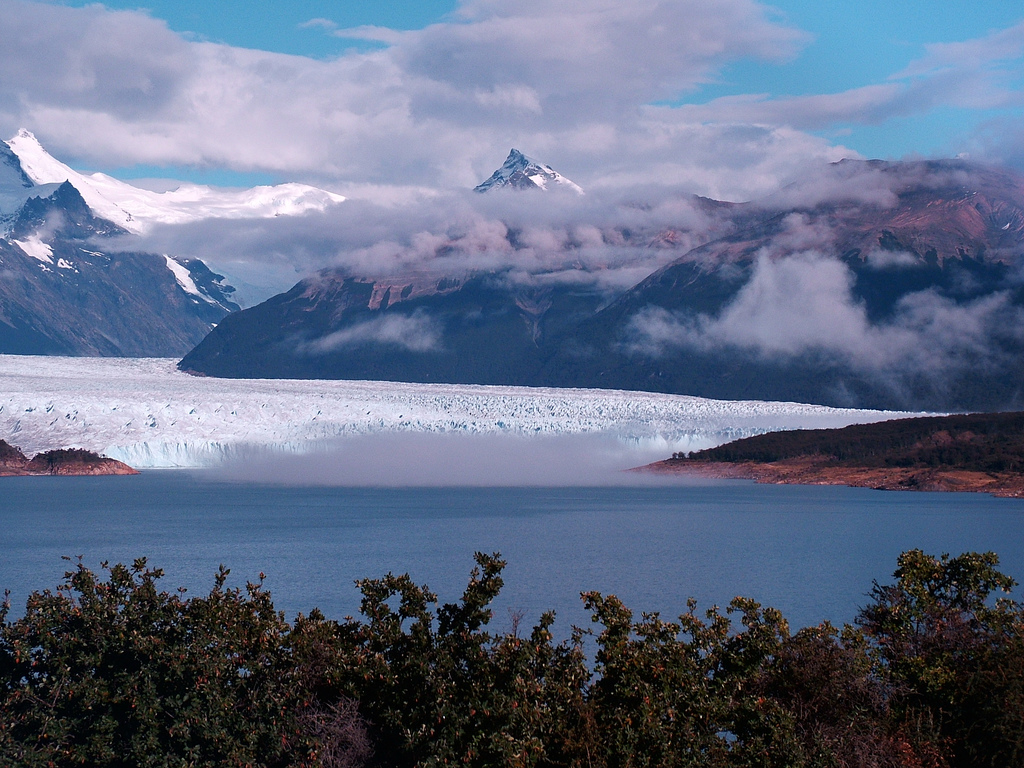

- Location of Lago Argentino Department in Santa Cruz Province.
- Country: Argentina
- Province: Santa Cruz
- Seat: El Calafate

Area
  - Total: 37,292 km^{2} (14,399 sq mi)

Population
  - Total: 25,586

Lago Argentino Department is one of the seven departments in Santa Cruz Province, Argentina. It has an area of 37,292 km^{2} and had a population of 25,586 at the 2022 Census. The seat of the department is in El Calafate.

Lago Argentino is a major lake in the department, in the foothills of the Andes.

== Municipalities ==
- El Calafate
- El Chaltén
- Tres Lagos
