= Francisco Moreno =

Argentine explorer

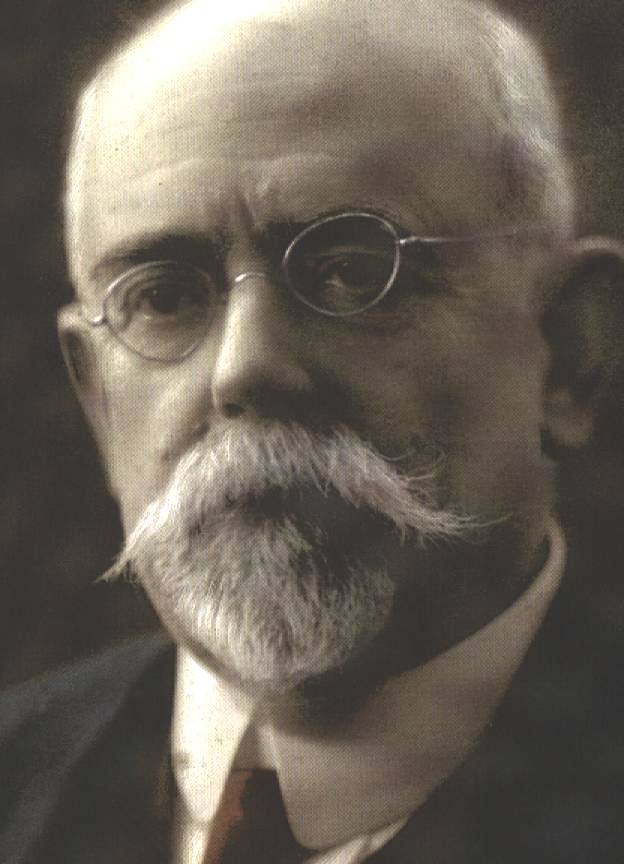
- Francisco P. Moreno
- Born: Francisco Pascasio Moreno; May 31, 1852; Buenos Aires, Argentina
- Died: November 22, 1919 (aged 67); Buenos Aires, Argentina
- Known for: Exploration of the Patagonia
- Awards: Founder's Medal (1907); Cullum Geographical Medal (1909)

Francisco Pascasio Moreno (May 31, 1852 – November 22, 1919) was a prominent explorer and academic in Argentina, where he is usually referred to as Perito Moreno (perito means "specialist, expert"). Perito Moreno has been credited as one of the most influential figures in the Argentine incorporation of large parts of Patagonia and its subsequent development.

== Life and work ==
Moreno was born to Francisco and Juana Thwaites Moreno in Buenos Aires. Raised in a traditional patrician family, he studied in local parochial schools. He shared his spare time with his father searching for artifacts and fossils and, at age 14, created a homemade museum of his extensive collections.

Following graduation in 1872, he participated in the founding of the Argentine Scientific Society. He embarked on the first of the series of scientific expeditions that made him well known: a survey of Río Negro Territory, largely uncharted country. In January 1876, he reached Lake Nahuel-Huapi in the southern Andes, and on February 15, 1877, he discovered and named Lake Argentino. He also explored numerous rivers in Patagonia. On March 2, he discovered and named Mount Fitz Roy, after the commander of the expedition of HMS Beagle in the 1830s. The native people also called it Chalten.

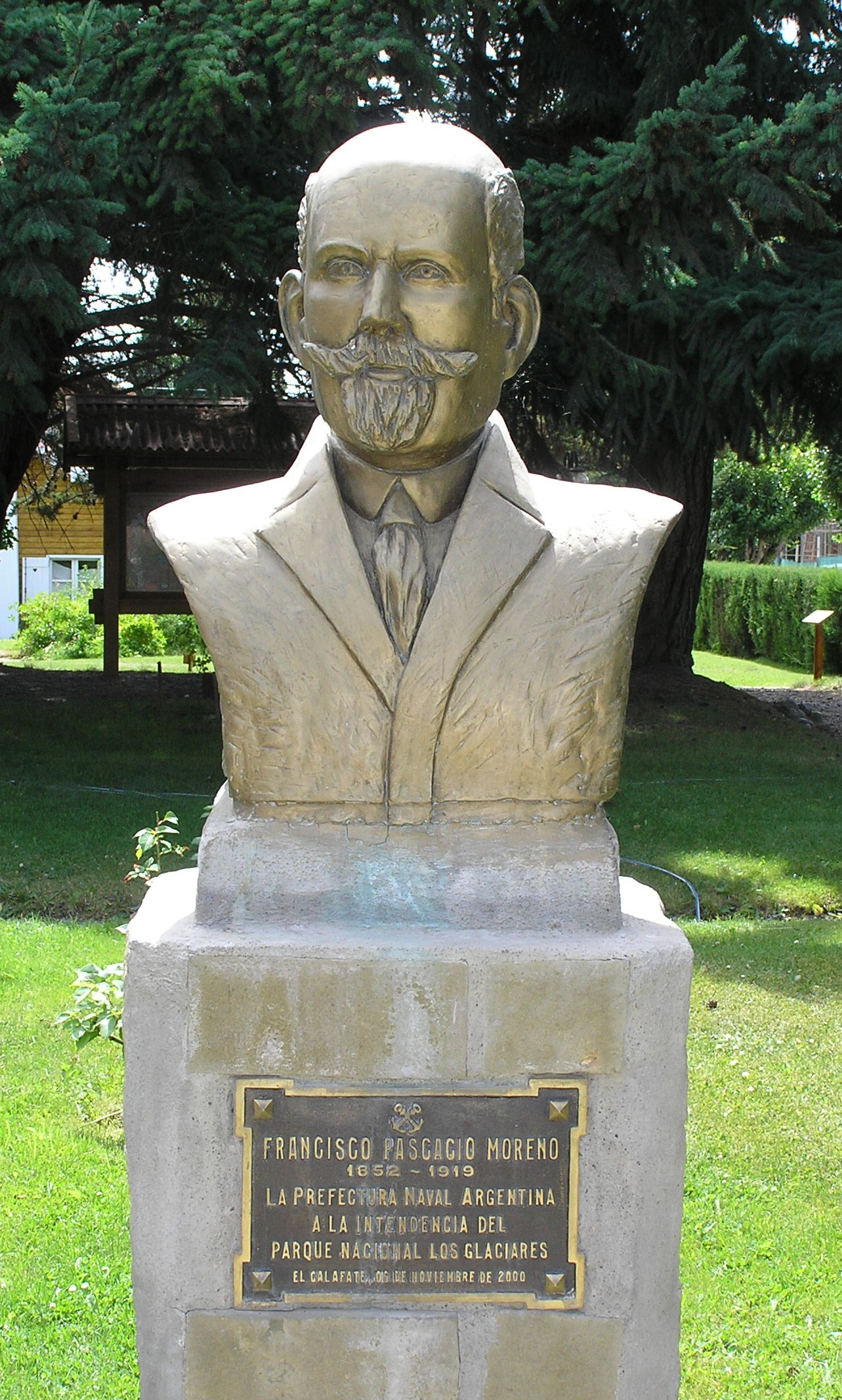
Bust of Francisco Moreno, in front of the Los Glaciares National Park offices in El Calafate.

In 1880, Moreno went to France, where he spoke at a meeting of the Anthropology Society of Paris, discussing two prehistoric skulls he had unearthed in Río Negro territory. He believed one was from the Quaternary period, and the other had ritual deformation in a manner similar to the skulls of the Aymara people of the Andes and Altiplano.

After his return to Argentina, that year he embarked on his second major expedition to the territory of Patagonia. He was taken prisoner by a Tehuelche aboriginal tribe and condemned to death. He escaped on March 11, one day before the appointed execution. During this period he met the Tehuelche chief, Inacayal, who was hospitable to him. Later Inacayal led a resistance to the government, not surrendering until 1884.

In 1882–1883 Moreno explored the Andes from Bolivia southward, and in 1884–1885 he made new explorations of the territory south of the Río Negro and of Patagonia. He was appointed as chief of the Argentine exploring commission of the southern territories, and member of numerous European scientific societies. For his contributions to science, Moreno received a doctorate Honoris causa from the National University of Córdoba in 1877.

He is also known for his role in defending Argentine interests. He made defining surveys that led to the Boundary treaty of 1881 between Chile and Argentina. In honor to this contribution, the Argentinian glacier Perito Moreno, was named after him. These surveys and others yielded Moreno a vast collection of archaeological and anthropological data and artifacts, for which he founded an anthropological museum in Buenos Aires in 1877.

=== Museum director and perito ===
In 1888, he founded the La Plata Museum of Natural History, the most important of its kind in South America. The scholar Jens Andermann has studied how Moreno's collection of artifacts at these two museums helped establish Argentine history, and the government's claim to its territory. Through these scientific and cultural collections, Moreno contributed to the national mythology. He brought artifacts and materials in from remote regions to be examined, catalogued and studies at the museum in the capital. Andermann has written that such museums of natural history and anthropology "enabled and justified state control of both the natural resources and indigenous populations of Argentina." They also helped develop the national narratives being shaped. Moreno served as the first Director of Museo de la Plata, guiding it until 1906.

As director of La Plata Museum of Natural History, Moreno sacked Florentino Ameghino in 1888, even denying him entry to the museum.

In 1902 Moreno was appointed Perito (a technical specialist or expert), in which capacity he disproved Chilean claims to the continental divide in the Southern Cone. Moreno proved that many Patagonian lakes draining to the Pacific Ocean were part of the Atlantic Ocean basin. During the quaternary glaciations, they had become dammed by moraines, which changed their outlets to drain to the west and Chilean territory.

In 1903, Moreno donated some of the land previously given to him in order to establish the Nahuel Huapi National Park. In a letter dated 3 November 1903 to the Minister of Agriculture Wenceslao Escalante, Moreno justified his donation, among other things, by comparing it with the establishment of national parks in the USA. He was appointed assistant director of the National Education Council in 1911 and helped secure funding for the Bernasconi Institute, a landmark primary school built in Buenos Aires. It was constructed on land Moreno sold to Swiss Argentine industrialist Félix Bernasconi. Its archaeological and natural history museums were created in part with his extensive collections of artifacts.

He established the Scouting and Guiding in Argentina, the Argentine Boy Scouts Association in 1912, and joined former U.S. President Theodore Roosevelt in a tour of Patagonia. He continued to oversee the La Plata Museum well after his official retirement.

In later years Moreno responded to political developments in South America at the time of World War I by joining the reactionary Argentine Patriotic League shortly before his death in 1919. Moreno was first interred in a La Recoleta Cemetery crypt. In 1944 his remains were transferred and reinterred at Centinela Isle in Lake Nahuel Huapi.

A species of Argentinian lizard, Liolaemus morenoi, is named in his honor.

== Gallery ==
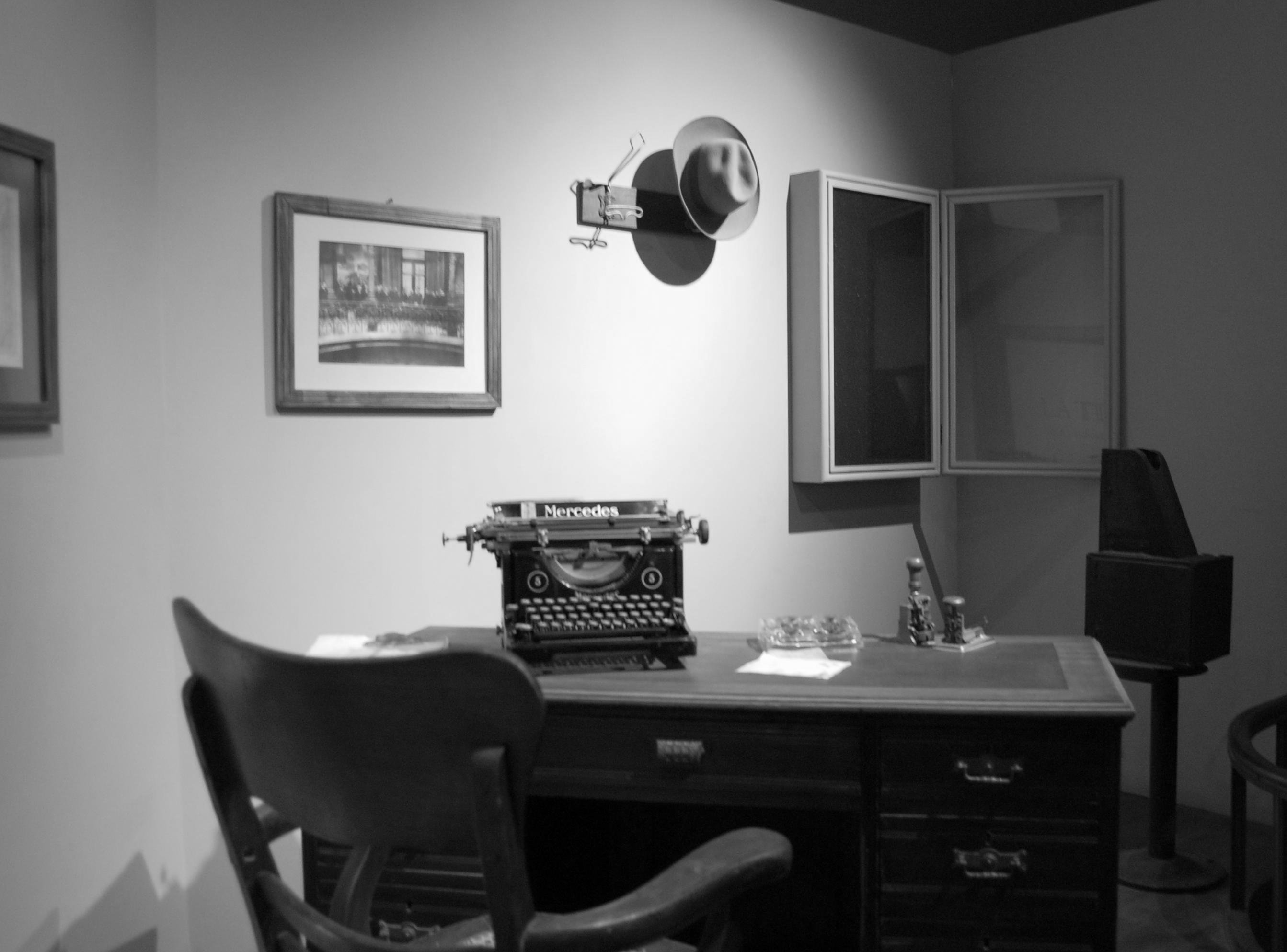
Moreno's office at the La Plata Museum, his last post

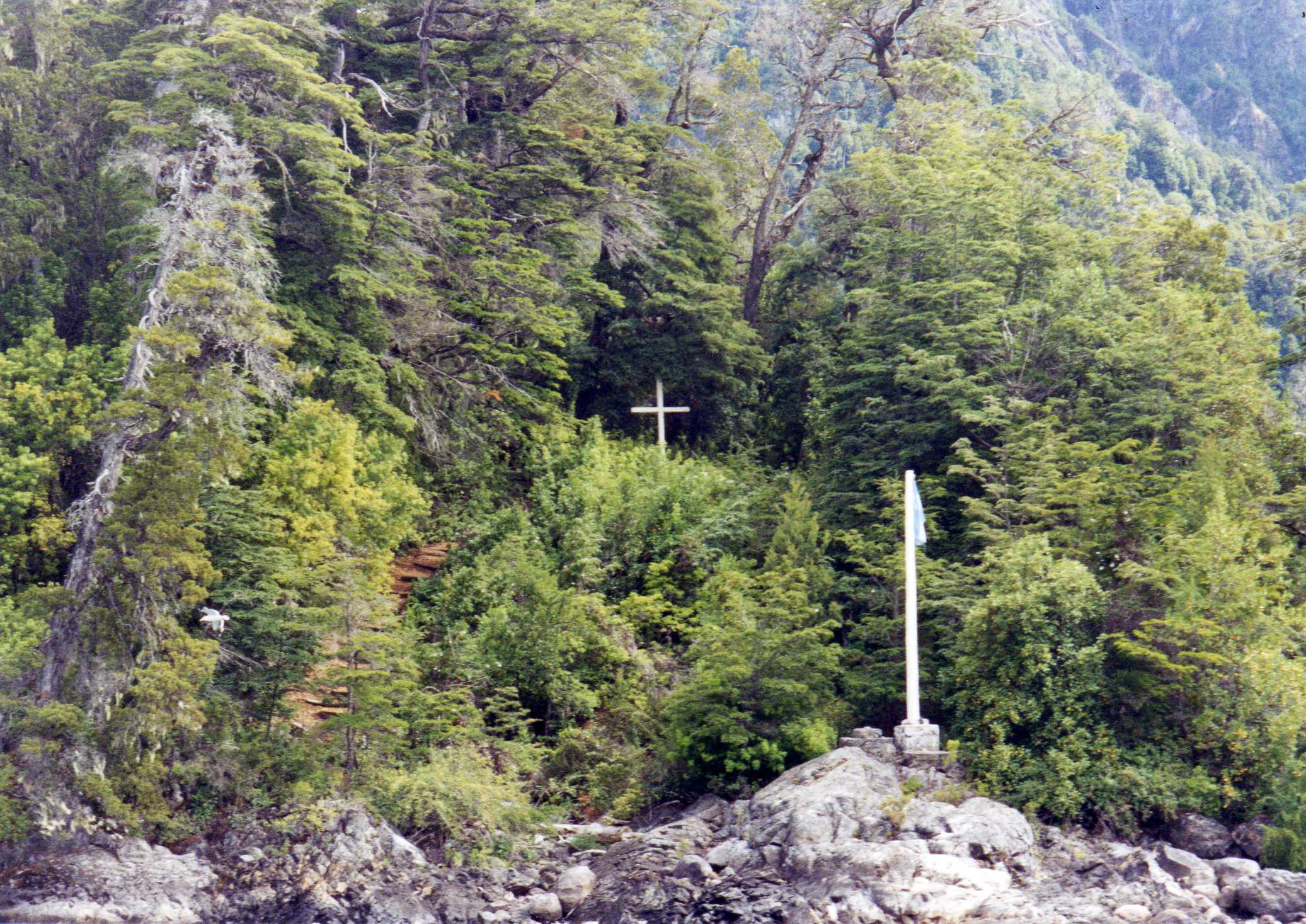
Moreno's resting place on Centinela Isle
