= Diego Barros Arana =

Chilean historian (1830–1907)

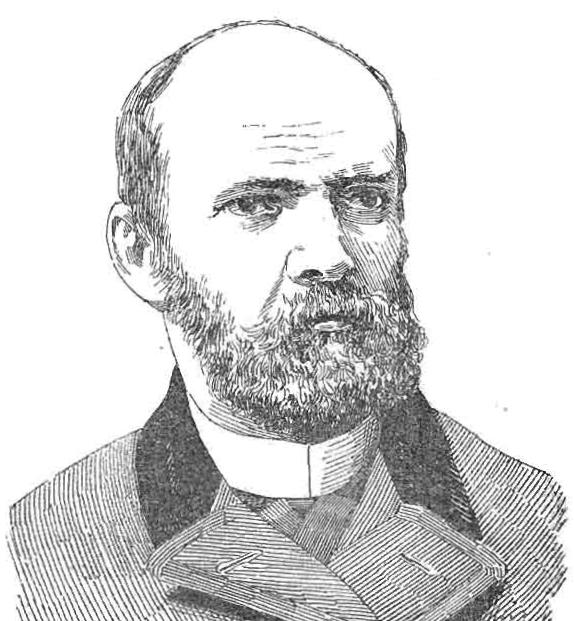
- Born: August 16, 1830; Santiago, Chile
- Died: November 4, 1907 (aged 77); Santiago, Chile
- Known for: Historia General de Chile

Academic work
- Discipline: History of Chile

Diego Jacinto Agustín Barros Arana (Latin American Spanish: [ˈdjeɣo ˈβaros aˈɾana]; August 16, 1830 – November 4, 1907) was a Chilean professor, legislator, minister and diplomat. He is considered the most important Chilean historian of the 19th century. His main work General History of Chile (Spanish: Historia General de Chile) is a 15-volume work that spanned over 300 years of the nation's history.

Barros Arana was of Basque descent. He also was an educator and a diplomat. He was director of the Instituto Nacional, a public high school, and of the University of Chile.

== Works ==
- Estudios históricos sobre Vicente Benavides y las campañas del Sur: 1818–1822 (in Spanish). Santiago, Chile: Imprenta de Julio Belin y Compañia. 1850.
- Historia General de la Independencia de Chile (in Spanish). Vol. I–IV. Santiago, Chile: Imprenta del Ferrocarril. 1855.
- Vida y Viajes de Hernando de Magallanes (in Spanish). Santiago, Chile: Imprenta Nacional. 1864.
- Compendio de Historia Moderna (in Spanish). Valparaíso, Chile: Imprenta y Libreria del Mercurio. 1870.
- Riquezas de los Antiguos Jesuítas de Chile (in Spanish). Valparaíso, Chile: Imprenta y Libreria del Mercurio. 1872.
- Mi Destitución (in Spanish). Santiago, Chile: Imprenta del Ferrocarril. 1873.
- Proceso de Pedro de Valdivia y Otros Documentos Inéditos Concernientes a Este Conquistador (PDF) (in Spanish). Santiago, Chile: Librería Central de Augusto Raymond. 1873.
- Don Miguel Luis Amunátegui, Candidato a la Presidencia de la República (in Spanish). Santiago, Chile: Imprenta del Ferrocarril. 1875.
- Don Claudio Gay, su Vida y sus Obras, Estudio Biográfico y Crítico (in Spanish). Santiago, Chile: Imprenta Nacional. 1876. Online , p. PP7, at Google Books
- Historia de la Guerra del Pacífico (1879-1880) (in Spanish). Vol. I & II. Santiago, Chile: Librería Central de Mariano Servat. 1880.
  - Histoire de la Guerre du Pacifique (1879-1880) (in French). Paris, France: Librairie Militaire de Dumaine. 1881.
- Historia General de Chile (in Spanish). Vol. I–XVI. Santiago, Chile: Rafael Jover. 1884–1902.
- Elementos de Geografía Física (in Spanish). Santiago, Chile: Librería Central de Mariano Servat. 1888.
- La Cuestión de Límites entre Chile y la República Argentina (in Spanish). Santiago, Chile: Imprenta Cervantes. 1895.
- El Doctor Don Rodolfo Amando Philippi su Vida y sus Obras (in Spanish). Santiago, Chile: Imprenta Cervantes. 1904.
- Un Decenio de la Historia de Chile (1841-1851) (in Spanish). Vol. I & II. Santiago, Chile: Imprenta y Encuadernación Universitaria. 1905.

=== List of works ===
- Chiappa, Víctor M. (1907). Bibliografía de don Diego Barros Arana (in Spanish). Imprenta alemana.

== See also ==
- History of Chile
