= Cerro Ñato =

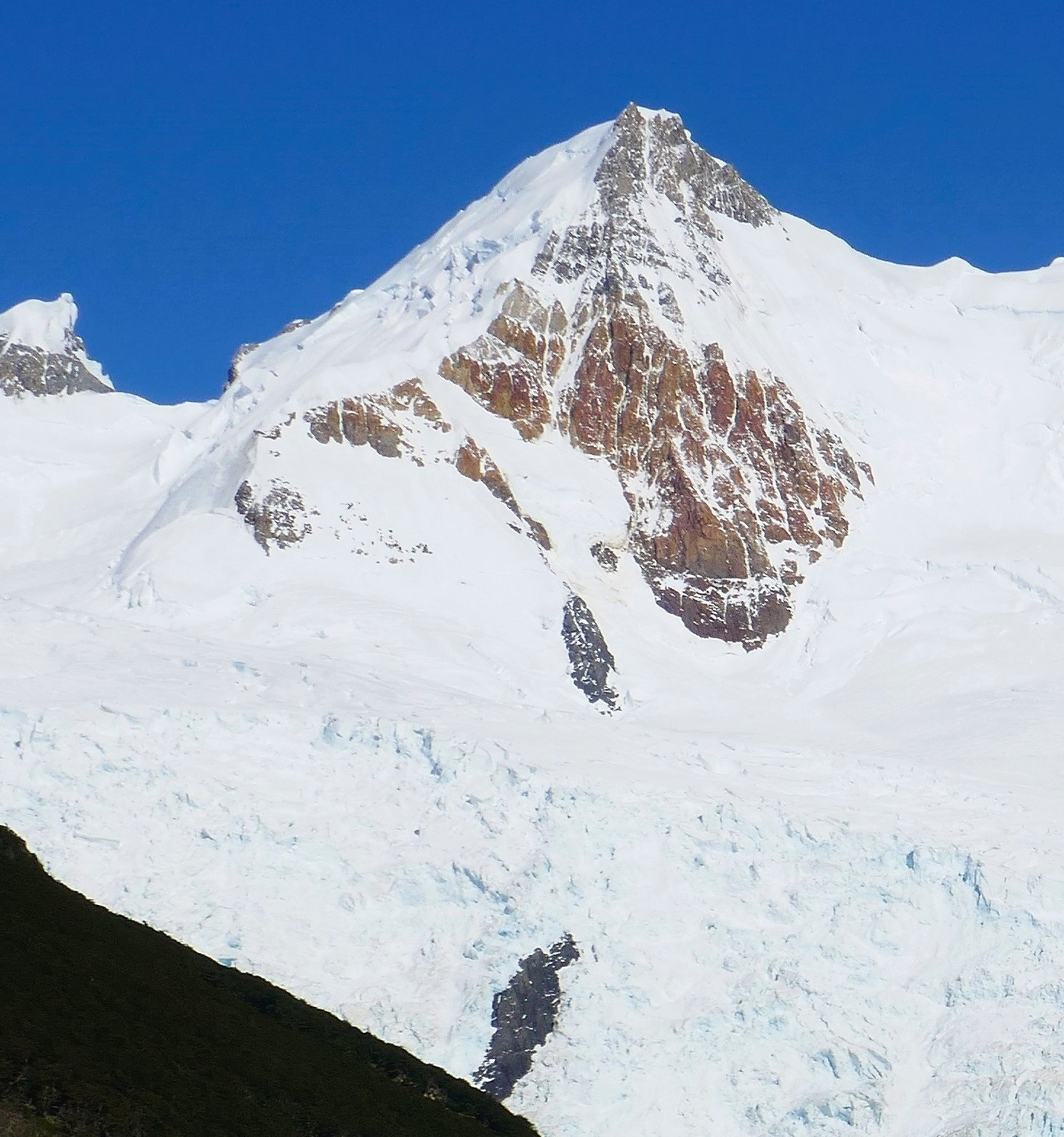
- East aspect

Highest point
- Elevation: 2,797 m (9,177 ft)
- Prominence: 195 m (640 ft)
- Parent peak: Cerro Torre
- Isolation: 0.7 km (0.43 mi)
- Coordinates: 49°19′12″S 73°05′43″W

Geography
- Location within Argentina Location within South America Location within Southern Patagonia
- Interactive map of Cerro Ñato
- Country: Argentina
- Province: Santa Cruz
- Protected area: Los Glaciares National Park
- Parent range: Andes
- Topo map: IGN 4769‑III El Chaltén

Geology
- Rock age: Cretaceous
- Rock type: Granite

Climbing
- First ascent: 1937

Cerro Ñato is a mountain in Santa Cruz Province, Argentina.

== Description ==
Cerro Ñato is a 2,797-meter-elevation (9,177-foot) summit in the Andes. The peak is located six kilometers (3.7 miles) southwest of Fitz Roy and 15 kilometers (9.3 miles) west of El Chaltén, in Los Glaciares National Park of Patagonia. It is also within the undefined border area subject to a dispute between Chile and Argentina, whose resolution has been suspended by an agreement in 1998 between the two countries. The Chilean-claimed side of the peak would be in Bernardo O'Higgins National Park and Chile's Magallanes Region. Precipitation runoff from the mountain's slopes drains to Viedma Lake. Topographic relief is significant as the summit rises 2,160 meters (7,086 ft) above Laguna Torre in five kilometers (3.1 miles), and 1,500 meters (4,921 ft) above the Viedma Glacier in four kilometers (2.5 miles). The nearest higher peak is Cerro Adela Sur, 0.8 kilometer (0.5 mile) to the north.

== History ==
German explorer Alfred Kölliker named this mountain during his 1915–16 Buenos Aires Sociedad Científíca Alemana expedition. The descriptive Spanish toponym translates as flat‑nosed, or snub‑nosed, mountain. The first ascent of the summit was made in 1937 by an Italian expedition composed of Ettore Castiglioni, Leo Dubosc, and Giovanni Titta Gilberti via the southwest ridge. The north ridge was first climbed on February 7, 1958, by Walter Bonatti and Carlo Mauri, while the southeast ridge was first climbed by Davide Brighenti and Alberto Rampini on April 11, 1987.

== Climate ==
According to the Köppen climate classification system, Cerro Ñato is located in a tundra climate zone with cold, snowy winters, and cool summers. Weather systems are forced upward by the mountains (orographic lift), causing moisture to drop in the form of rain and snow. This climate supports the Glaciar Grande on the east slope and the Viedma Glacier to the west. The months of November through March offer the most favorable weather for visiting or climbing in this area.

== Gallery ==
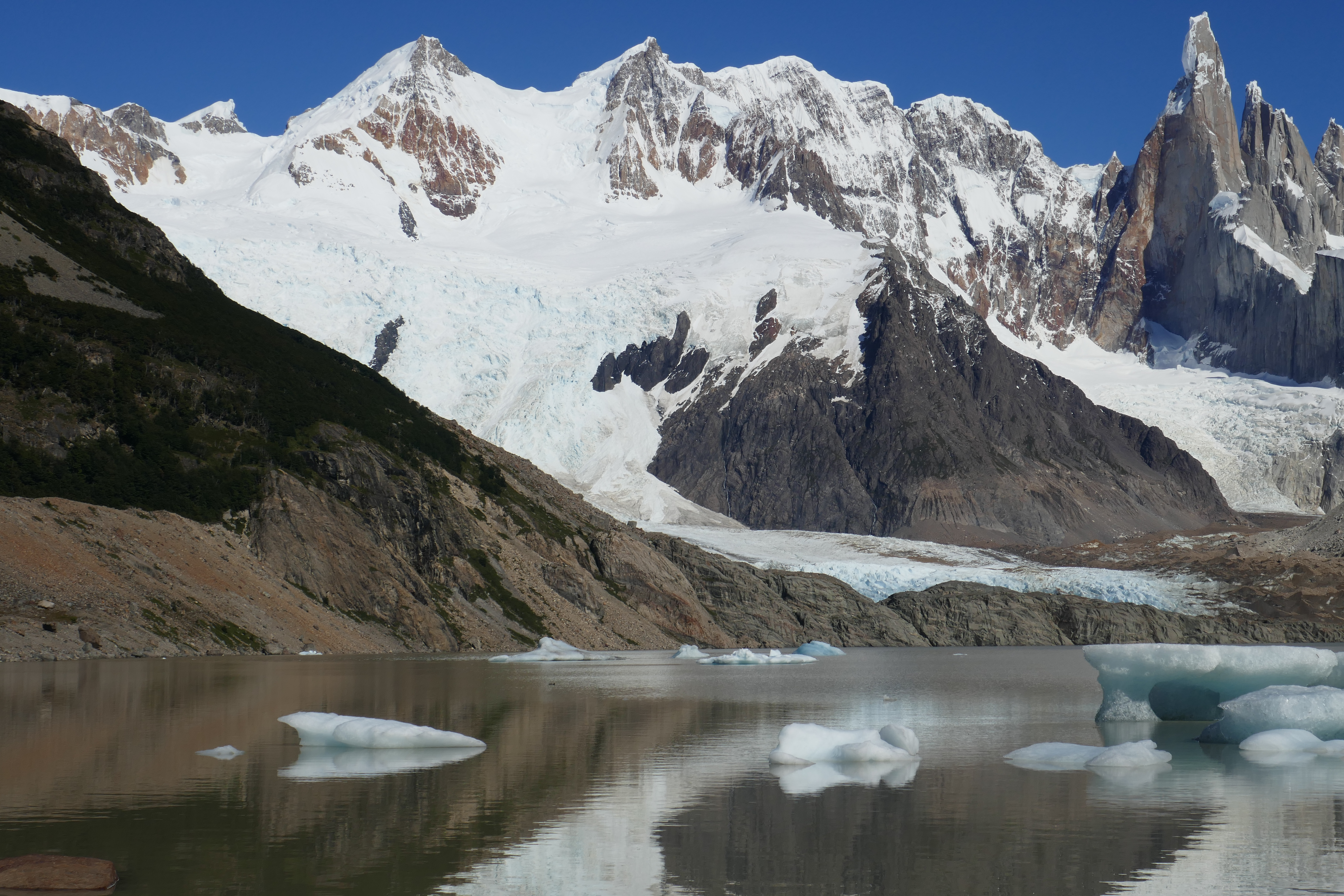
Cerro Ñato (left), Cerro Adela (center), and Cerro Torre (right) from Laguna Torre

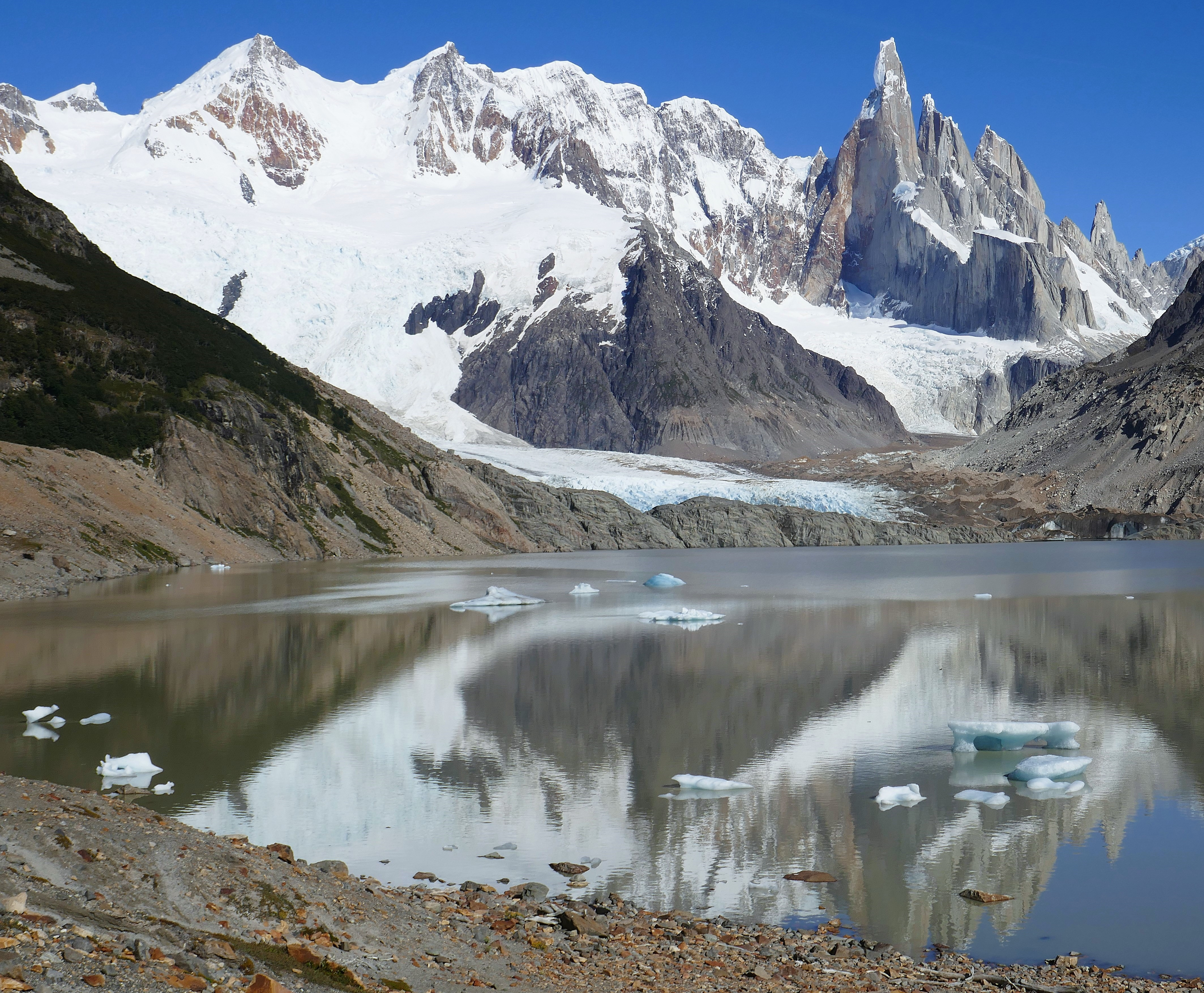
Cerro Ñato (left), Cerro Adela (center), and Cerro Torre (right) from Laguna Torre

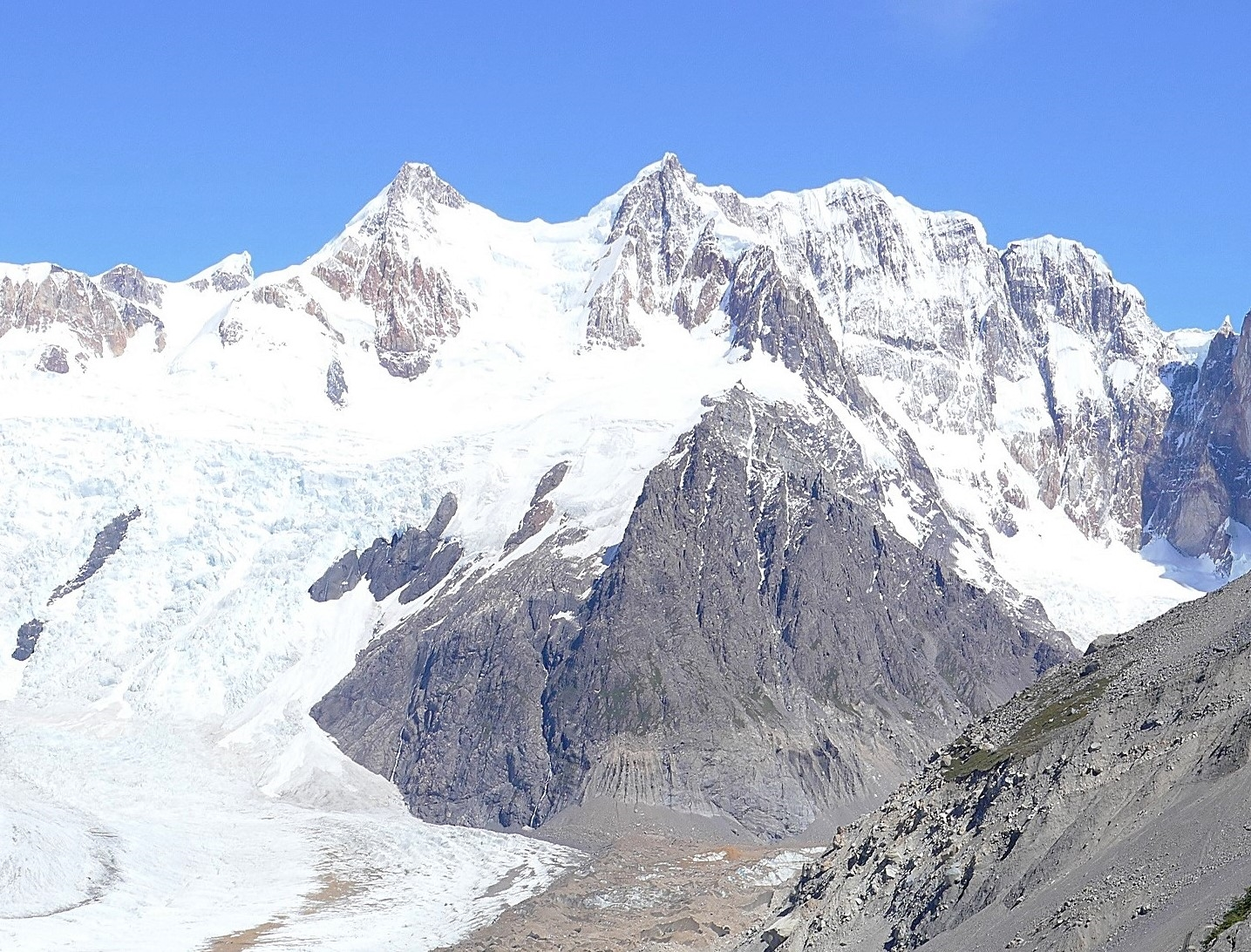
Cerro Ñato (left), Cerro Adela (right)

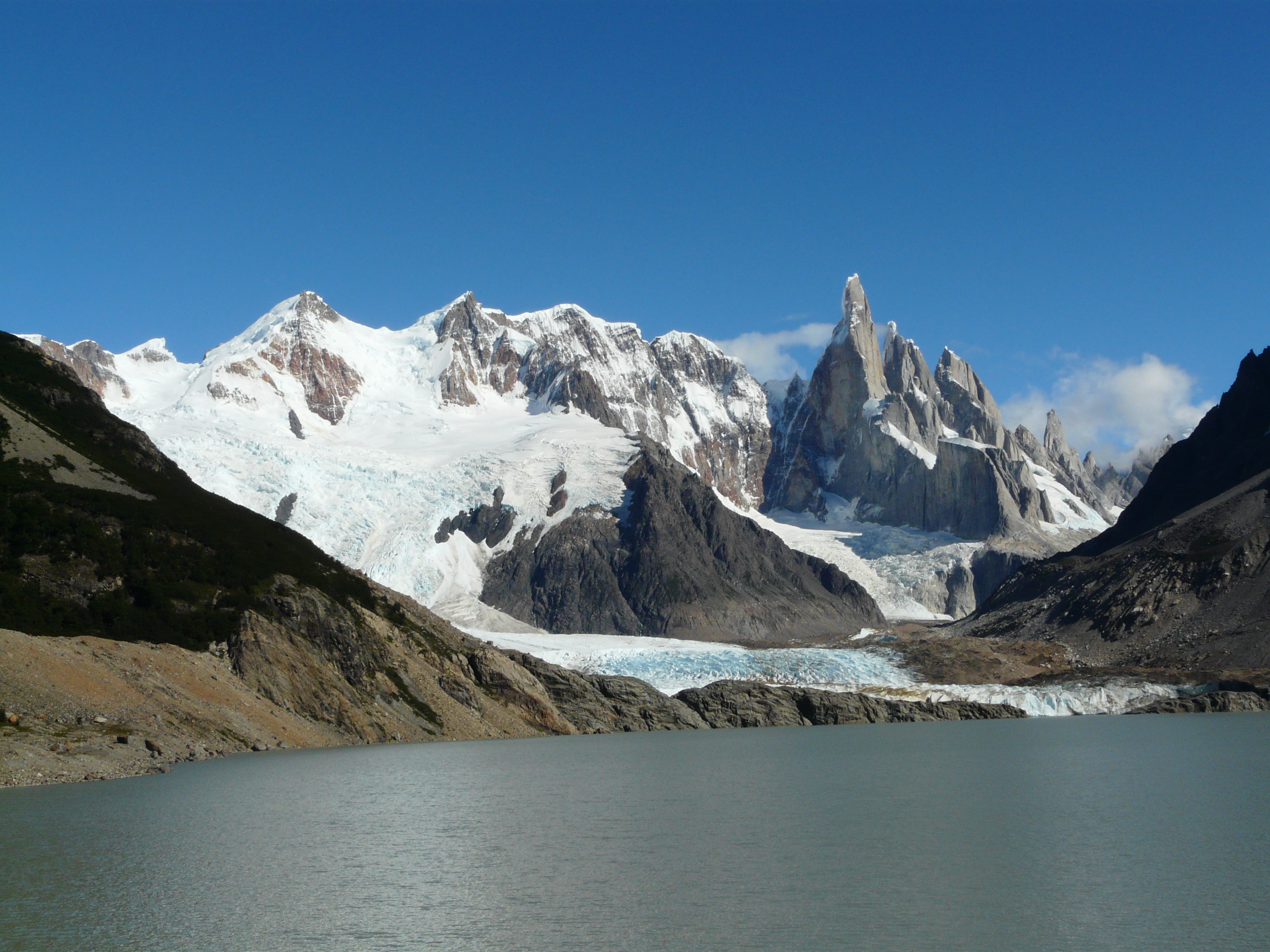
Cerro Ñato (left), Cerro Adela, and Cerro Torre (right) from Laguna Torre

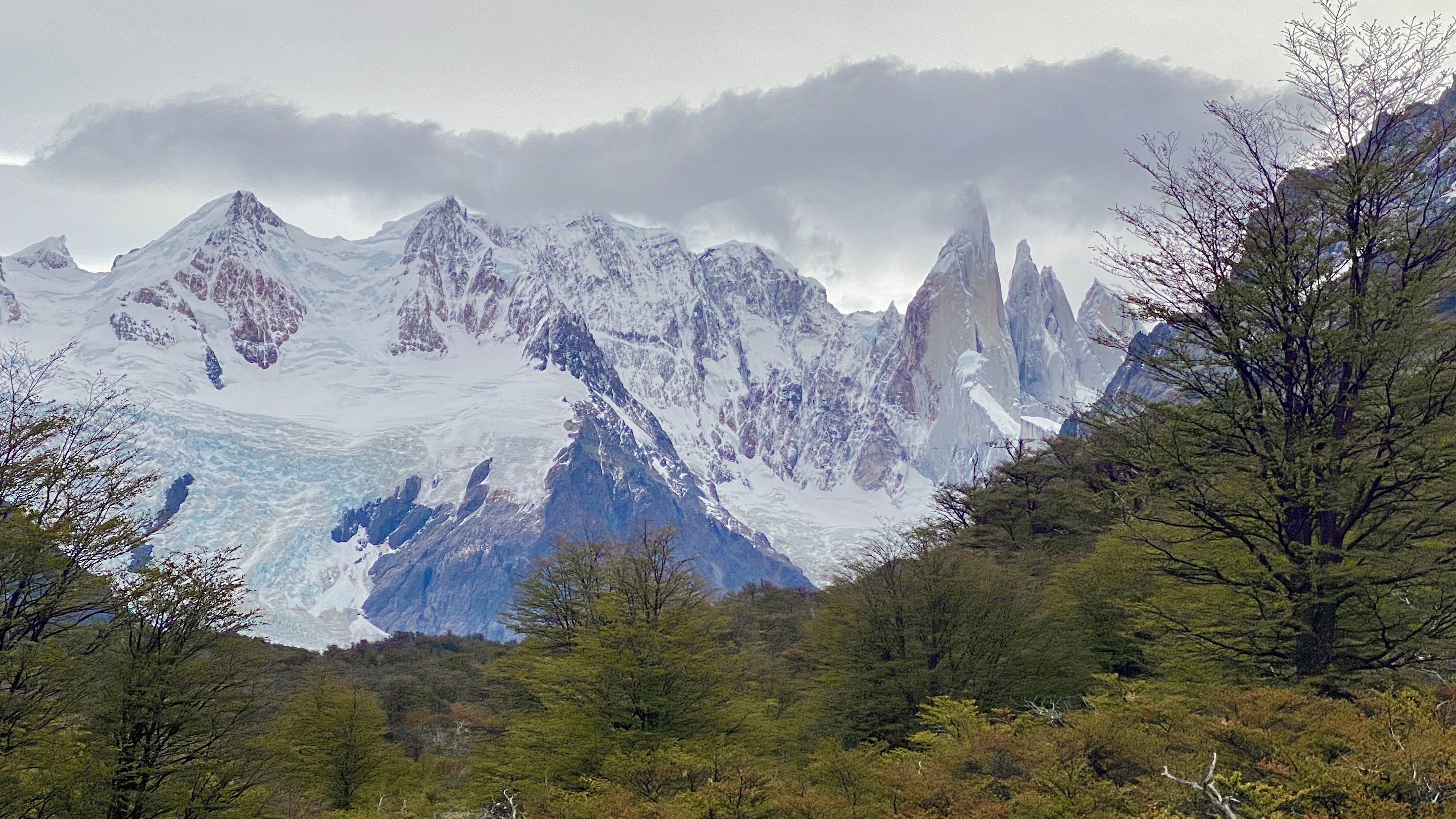
Cerro Ñato (left), Cerro Adela, and Cerro Torre (right)

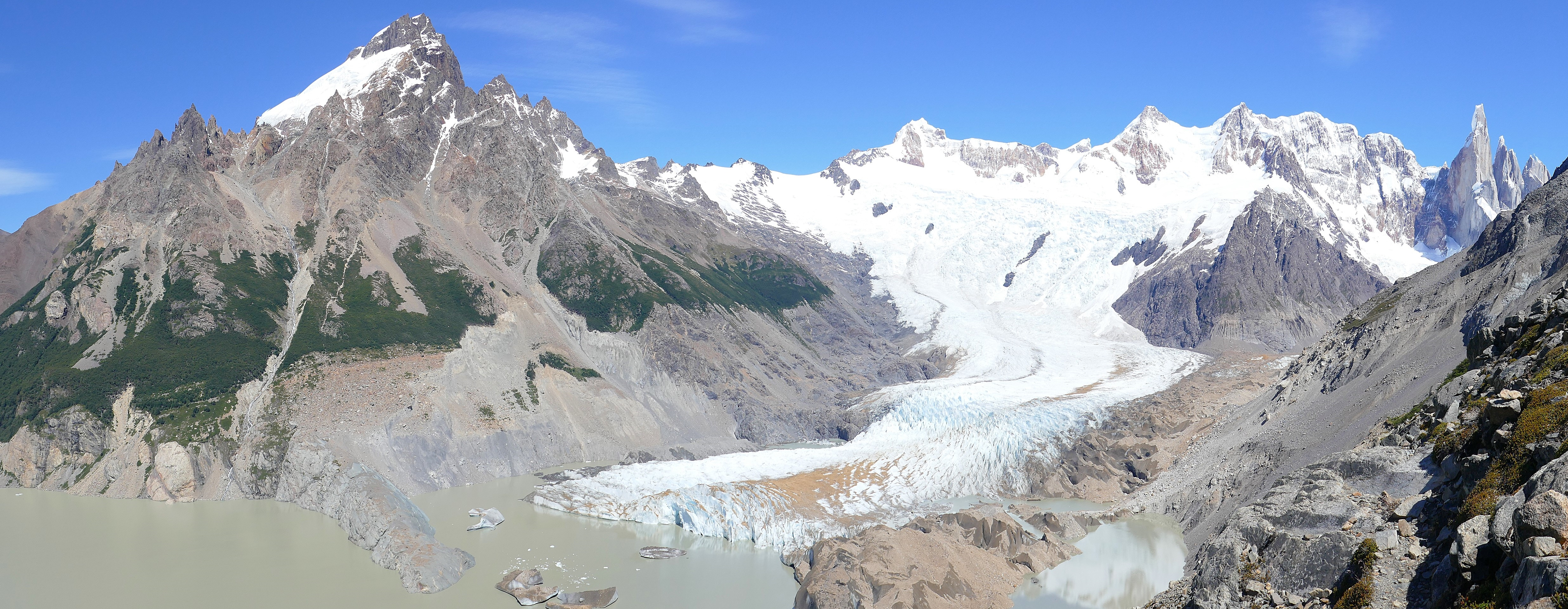
Laguna Torre, Cerro Solo, Glaciar Grande, Cerro Grande, Cerro Ñato, Cerro Adela, Cerro Torre

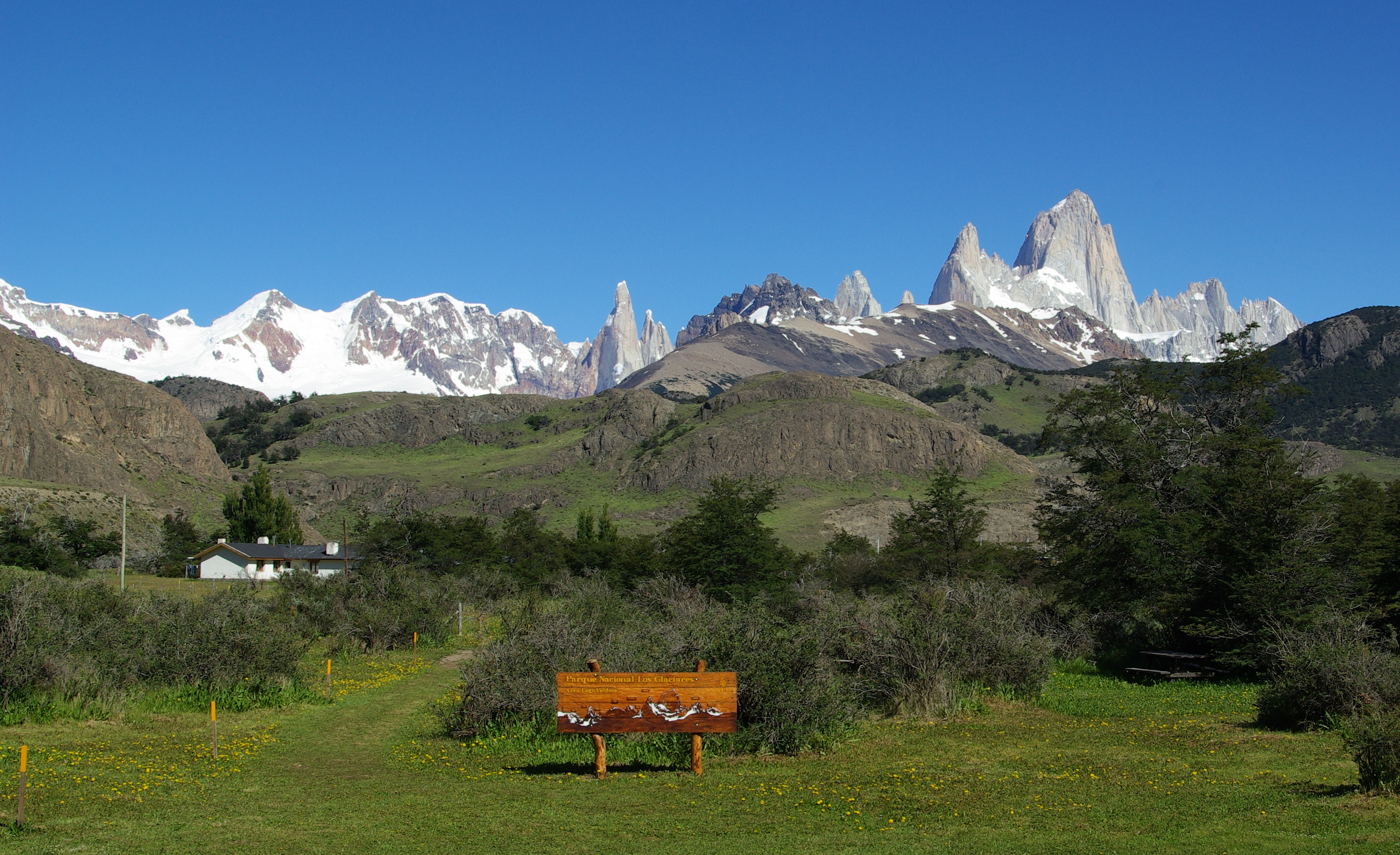
Cerro Ñato (left), Cerro Adela, Cerro Torre, and Fitz Roy (right)

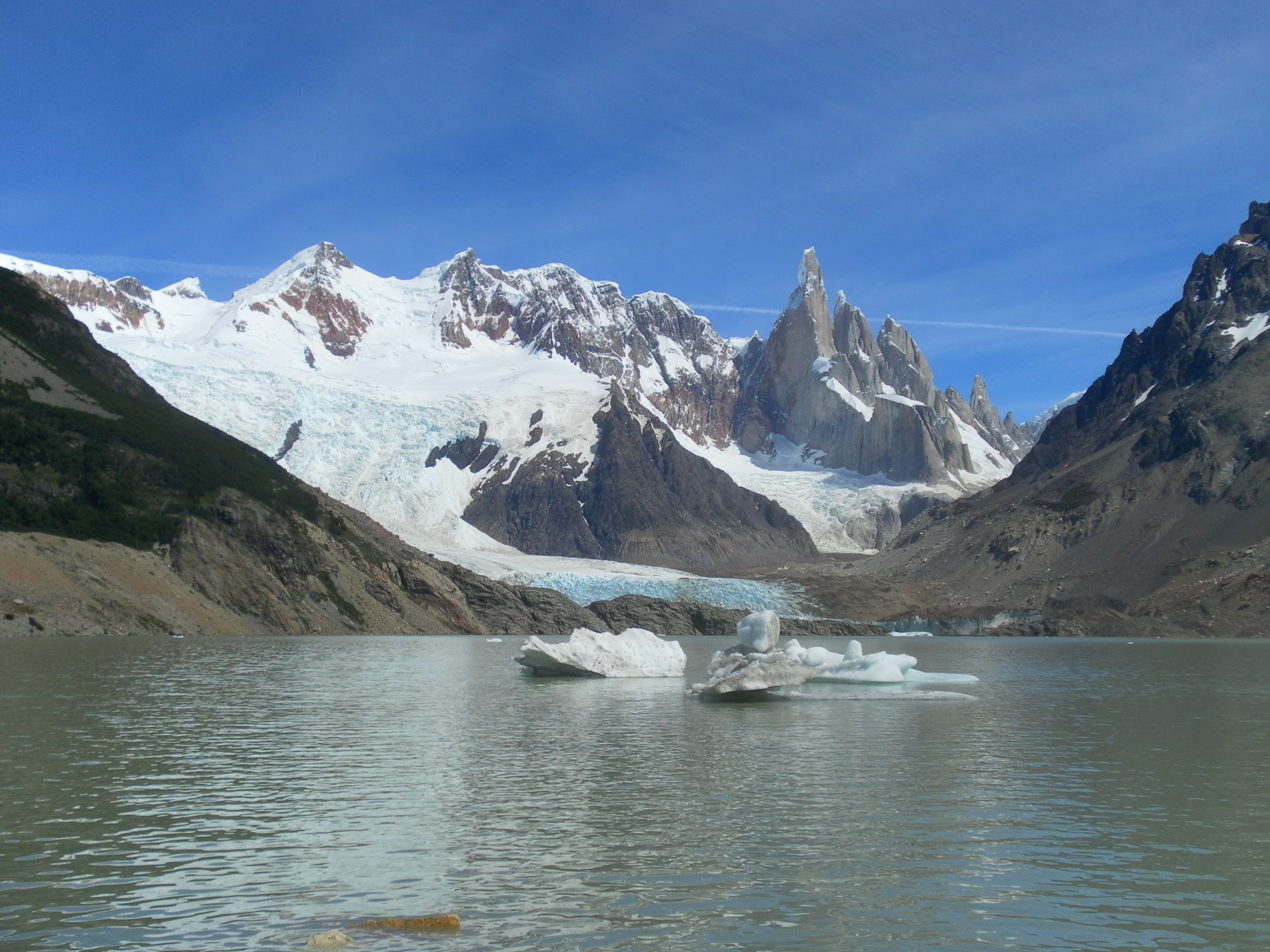
Cerro Ñato (left), Cerro Adela, and Cerro Torre (right) from Laguna Torre

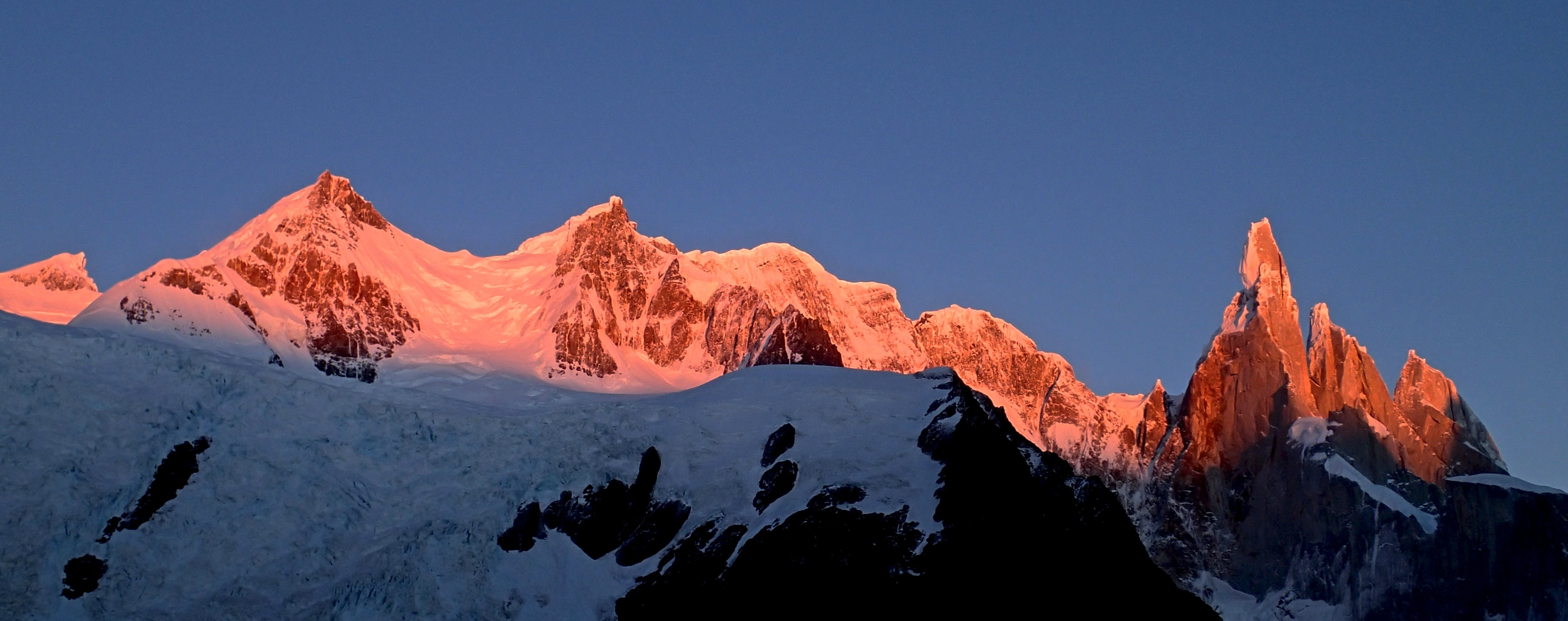
Cerro Ñato (left), Cerro Adela, Cerro Torre

== See also ==
- List of mountains in Argentina
- Southern Patagonian Ice Field dispute
