= Cerro Adela =

Mountain in Santa Cruz Province, Argentina

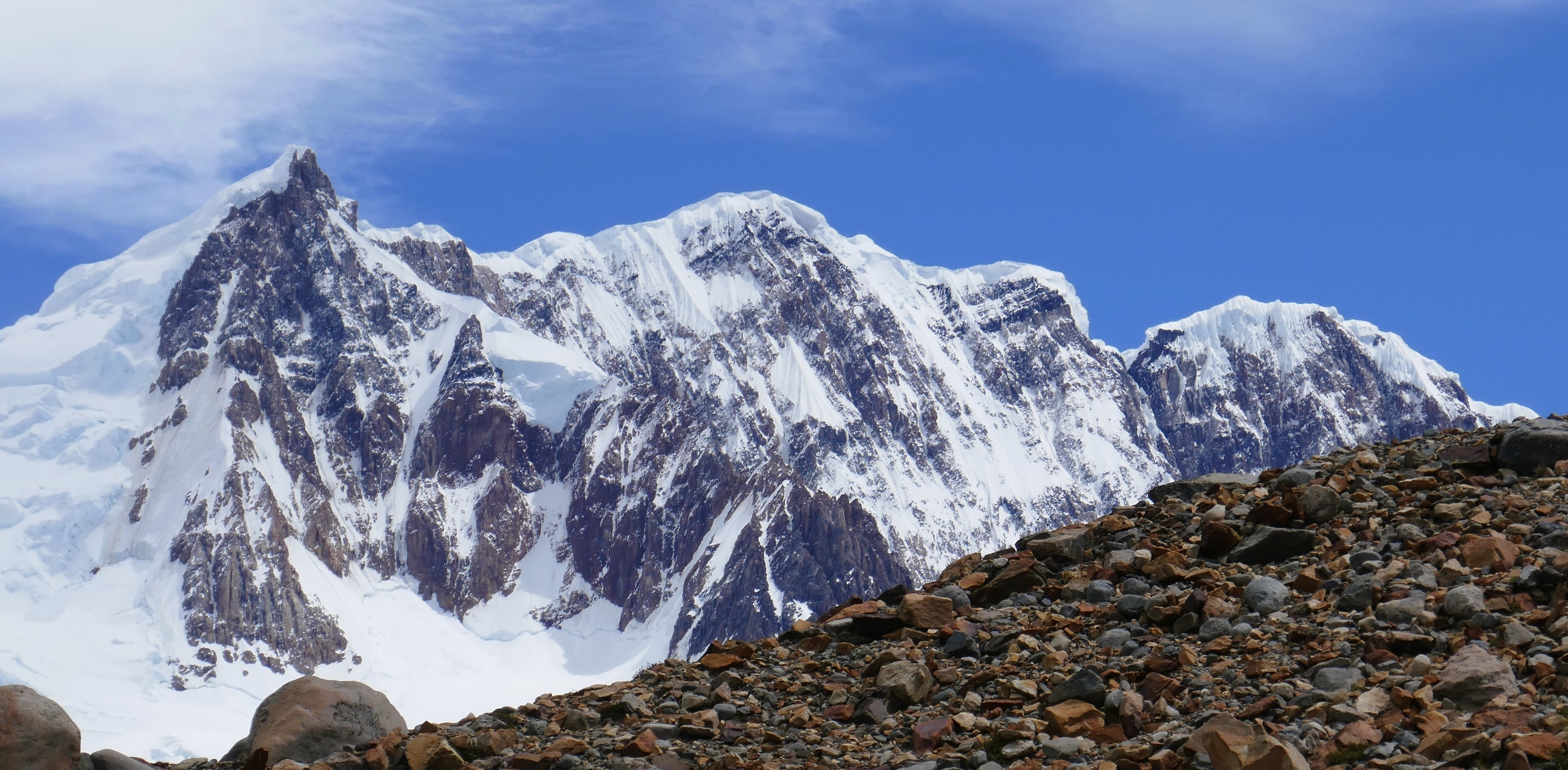
- East aspect, summit centered

Highest point
- Elevation: 2,938 m (9,639 ft)
- Prominence: 313 m (1,027 ft)
- Parent peak: Cerro Torre
- Isolation: 1.5 km (0.93 mi)
- Coordinates: 49°18′25″S 73°06′05″W

Geography
- Location within Argentina Location within South America Location within Southern Patagonia
- Interactive map of Cerro Adela
- Country: Argentina
- Province: Santa Cruz
- Protected area: Los Glaciares National Park
- Parent range: Andes
- Topo map: IGN 4769‑III El Chaltén

Geology
- Rock age: Cretaceous
- Rock type: Granite

Climbing
- First ascent: 1958

Cerro Adela is a mountain in Santa Cruz Province, Argentina.

== Description ==
Cerro Adela, also known as Cordón Adela, is a 2,938-meter-elevation (9,639-foot) summit in the Andes. The peak is located 5.8 kilometers (3.6 miles) southwest of Fitz Roy and 16 kilometers (10 miles) west of El Chaltén, in Los Glaciares National Park of Patagonia. It is also within the undefined border area subject to a dispute between Chile and Argentina, whose resolution has been suspended by an agreement in 1998 between the two countries. The Chilean side is in Bernardo O'Higgins National Park and the Magallanes Region. Precipitation runoff from the mountain's slopes drains to Viedma Lake. Topographic relief is significant as the summit rises 2,300 meters (7,546 ft) above Laguna Torre in six kilometers (3.7 miles), and 1,600 meters (5,250 ft) above the Viedma Glacier in three kilometers (1.86 miles). The nearest higher peak is Cerro Torre, 1.53 kilometers (0.95 mile) to the north-northeast.

== History ==
During German explorer Alfred Kölliker's 1915–16 Buenos Aires Sociedad Científíca Alemana expedition, he named this mountain in memory of his mother in 1916. The first ascent of the main summit was made on February 7, 1958, by Italians Walter Bonatti and Carlo Mauri. They also made the first ascent of the south summit (2,840 m) later the same day. The north summit (2,825 m) was first climbed in 1988 by Eduardo Brenner and Silvia Fitzpatrick.

== Climate ==
According to the Köppen climate classification system, Cerro Adela is located in a tundra climate zone with cold, snowy winters, and cool summers. Weather systems are forced upward by the mountains (orographic lift), causing moisture to drop in the form of rain and snow. This climate supports the Glaciar Grande on the east slope and the Viedma Glacier to the west. The months of November through March offer the most favorable weather for visiting or climbing in this area.

== Gallery ==
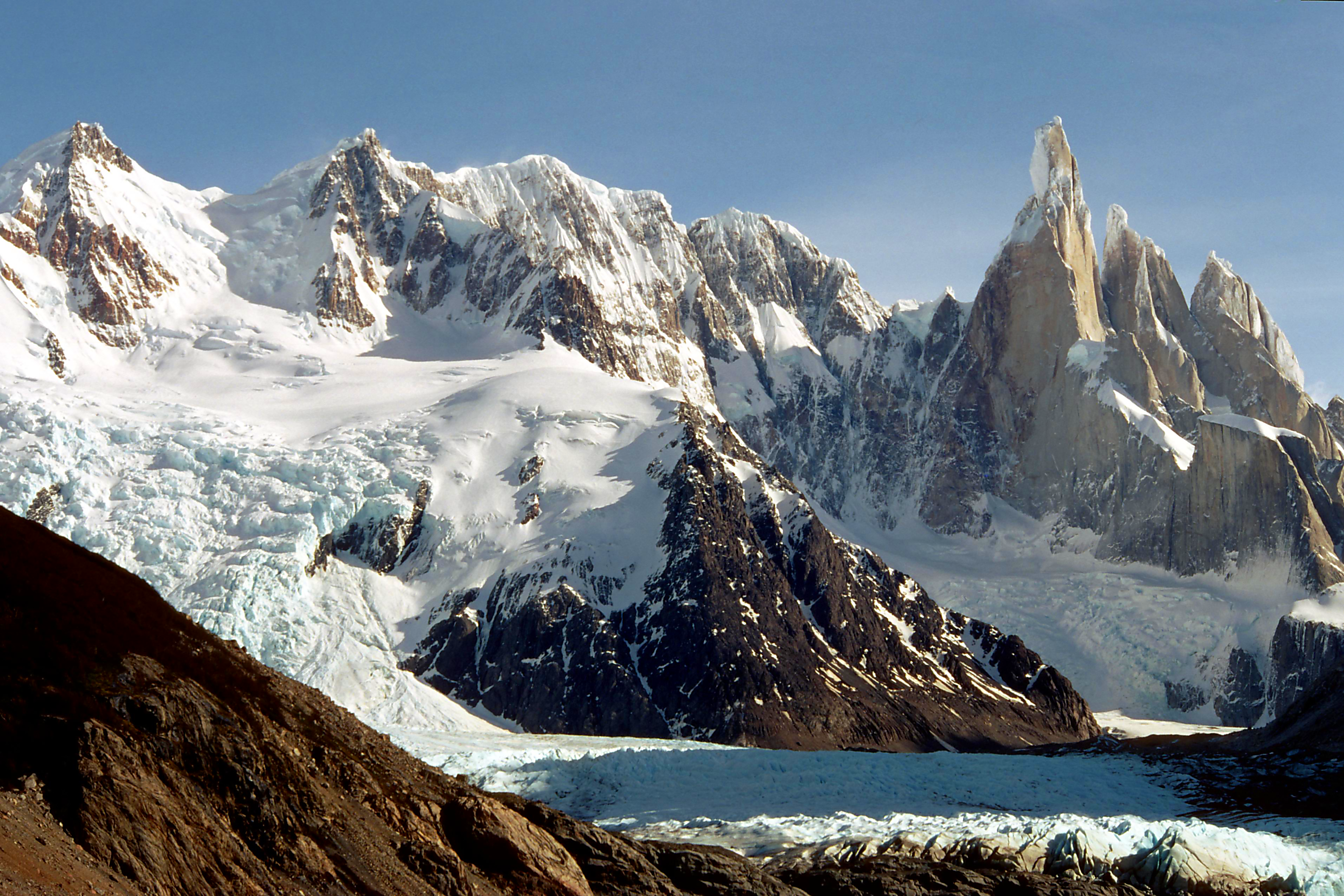
Cerro Adela (left) and Cerro Torre (right)

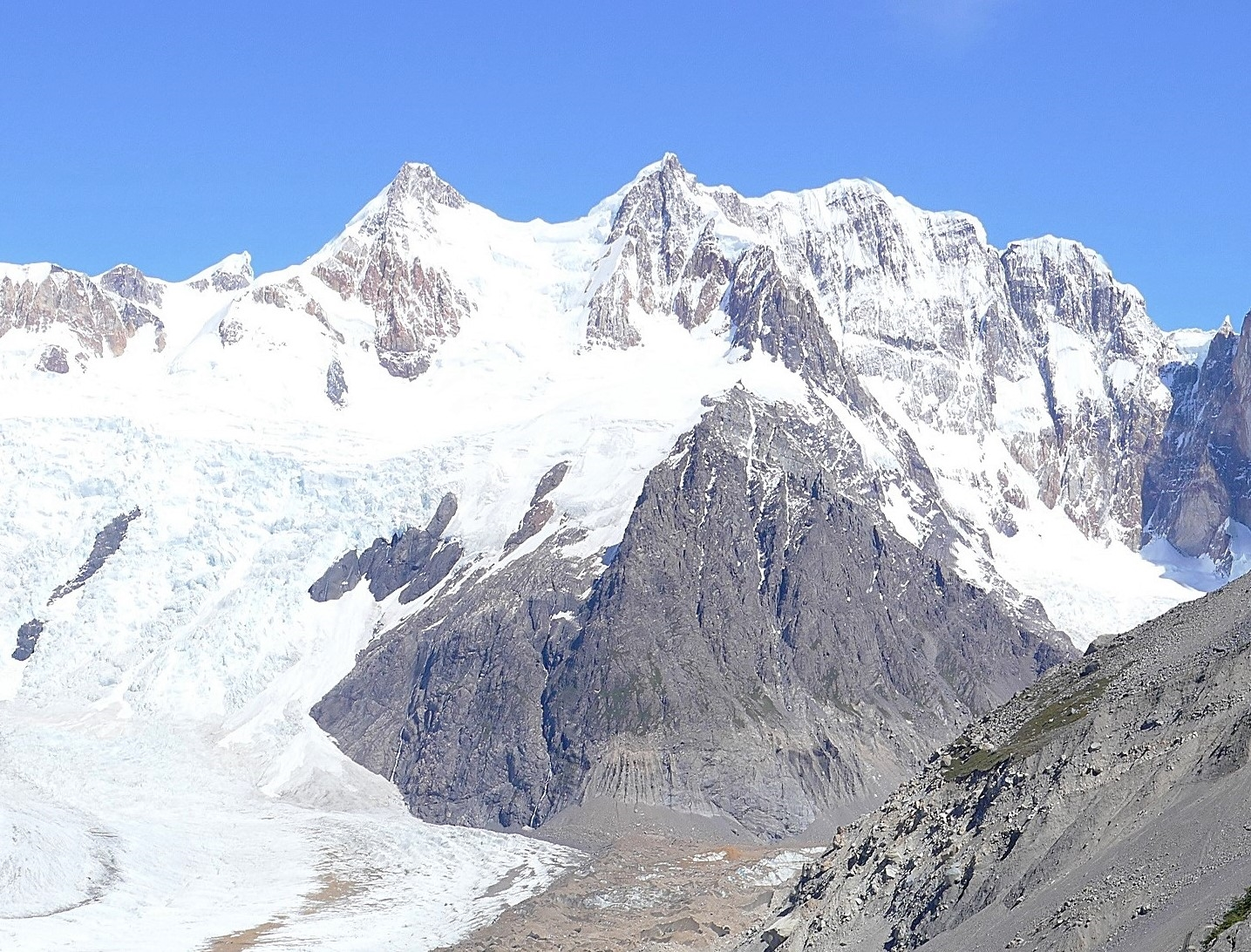
Cerro Ñato (left), Cerro Adela (right)

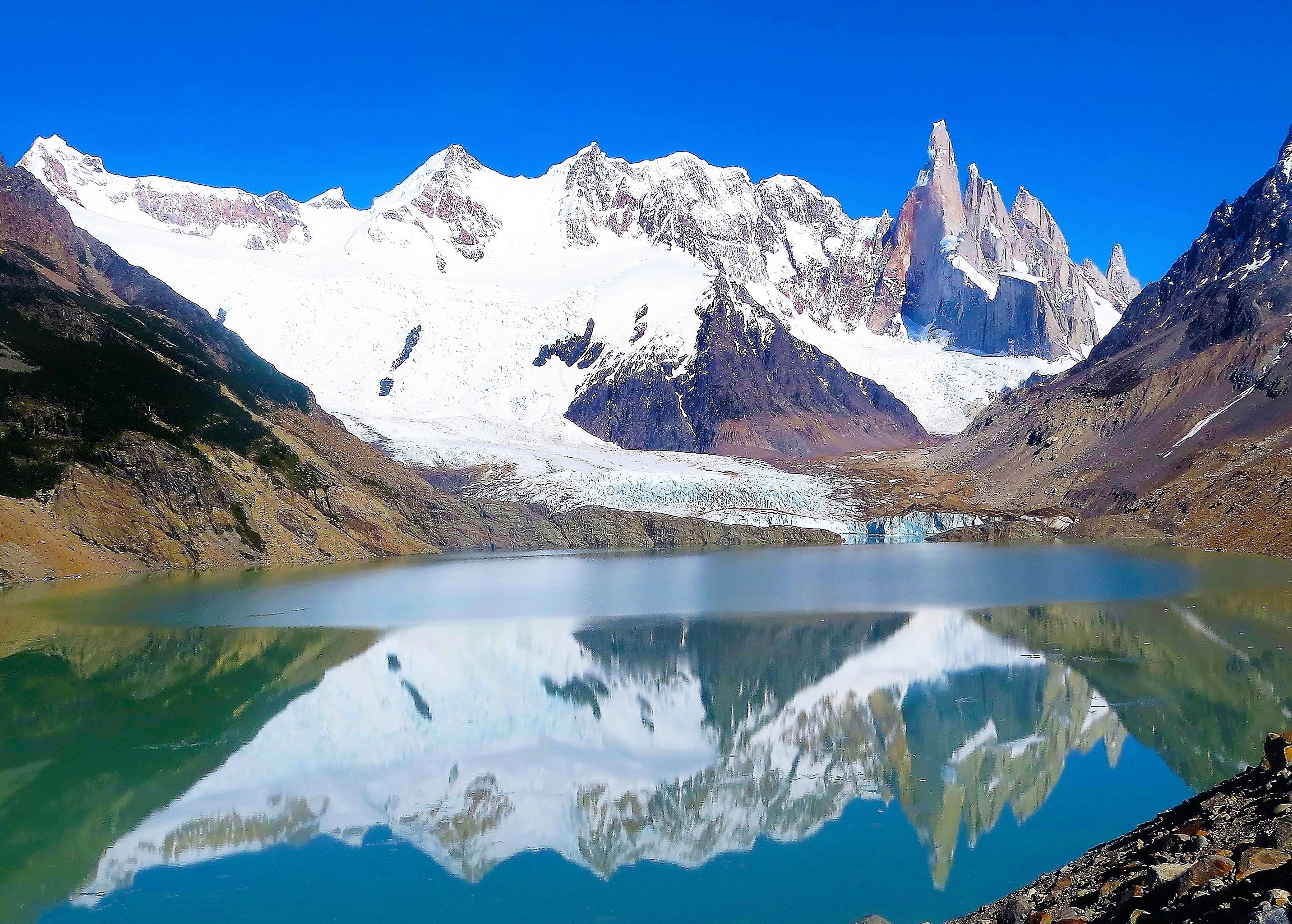
Cerro Adela centered on skyline

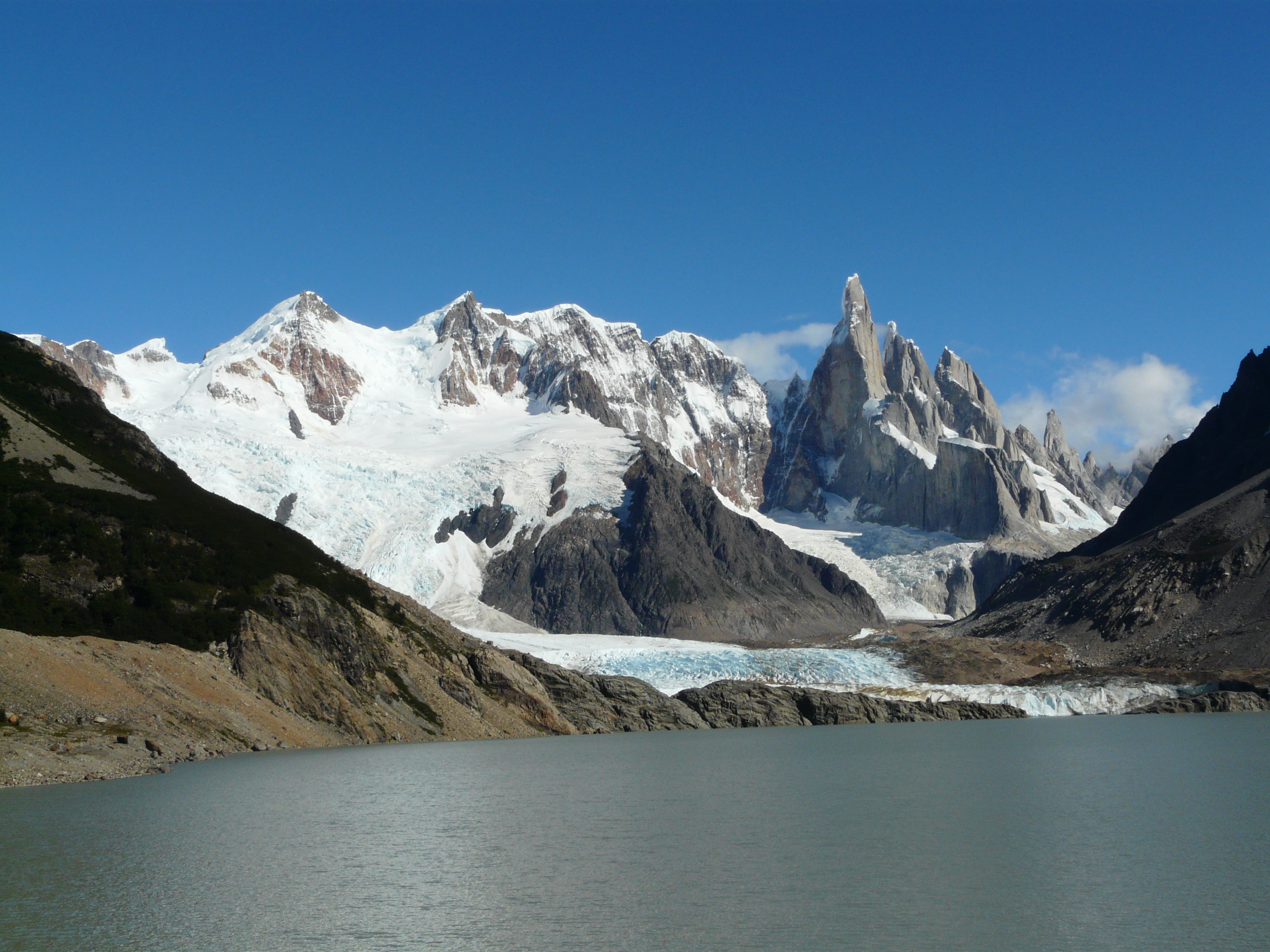
Cerro Adela (left) and Cerro Torre (right) from Laguna Torre

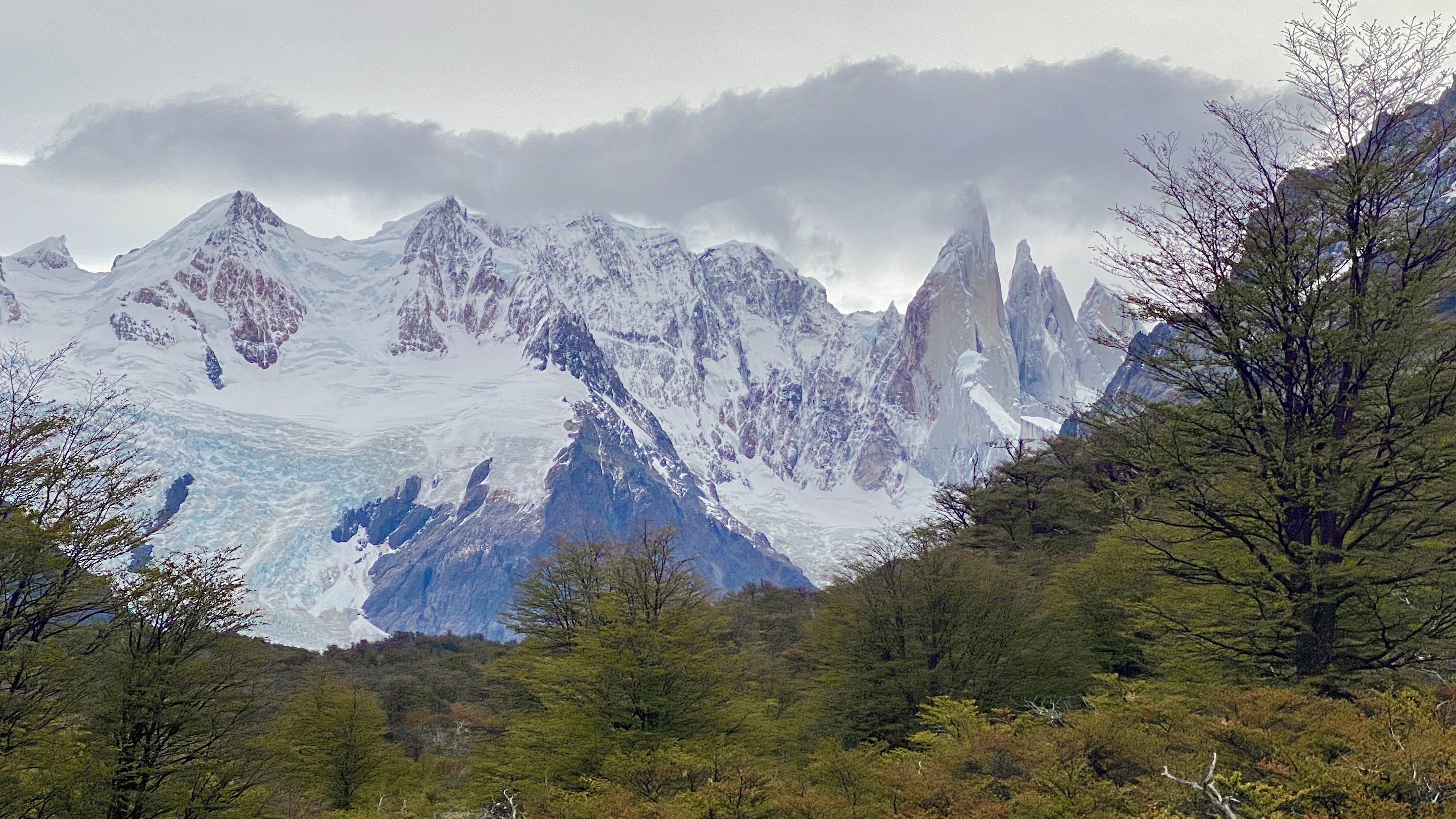
Cerro Ñato (left), Cerro Adela, and Cerro Torre (right)

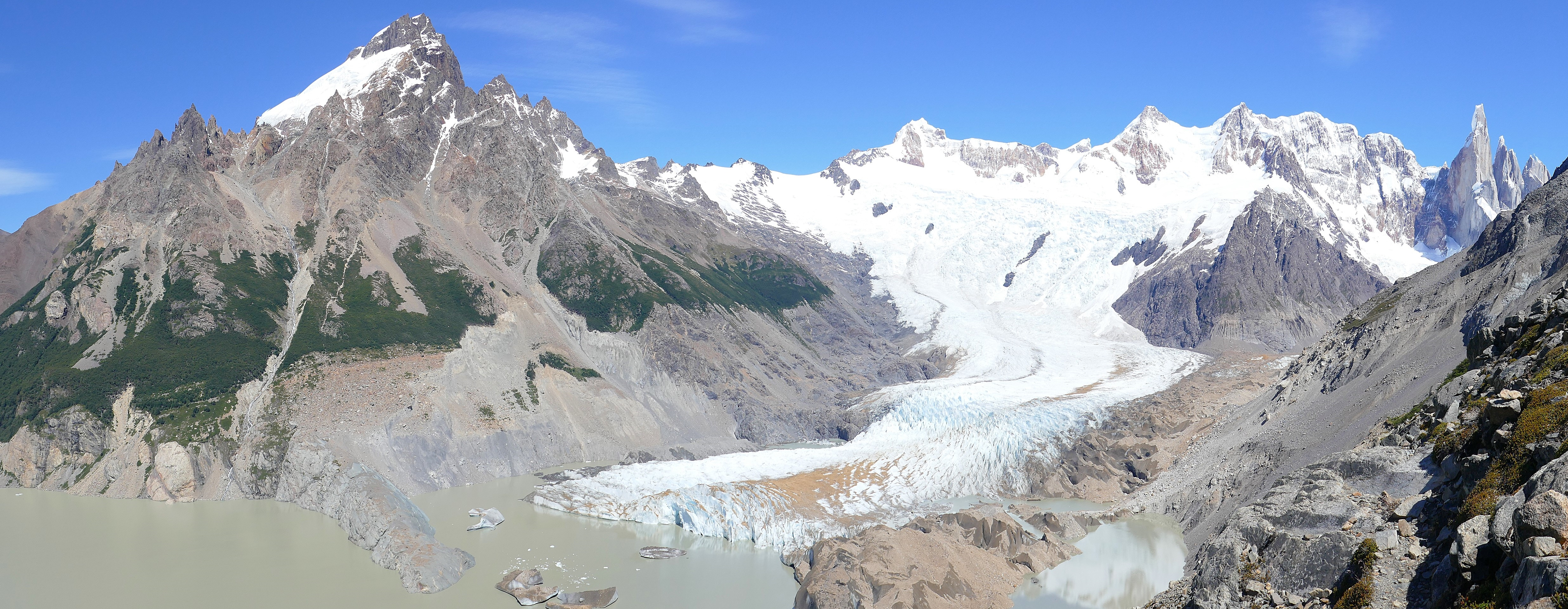
Laguna Torre, Cerro Solo, Glaciar Grande, Cerro Grande, Cerro Ñato, Cerro Adela, Cerro Torre

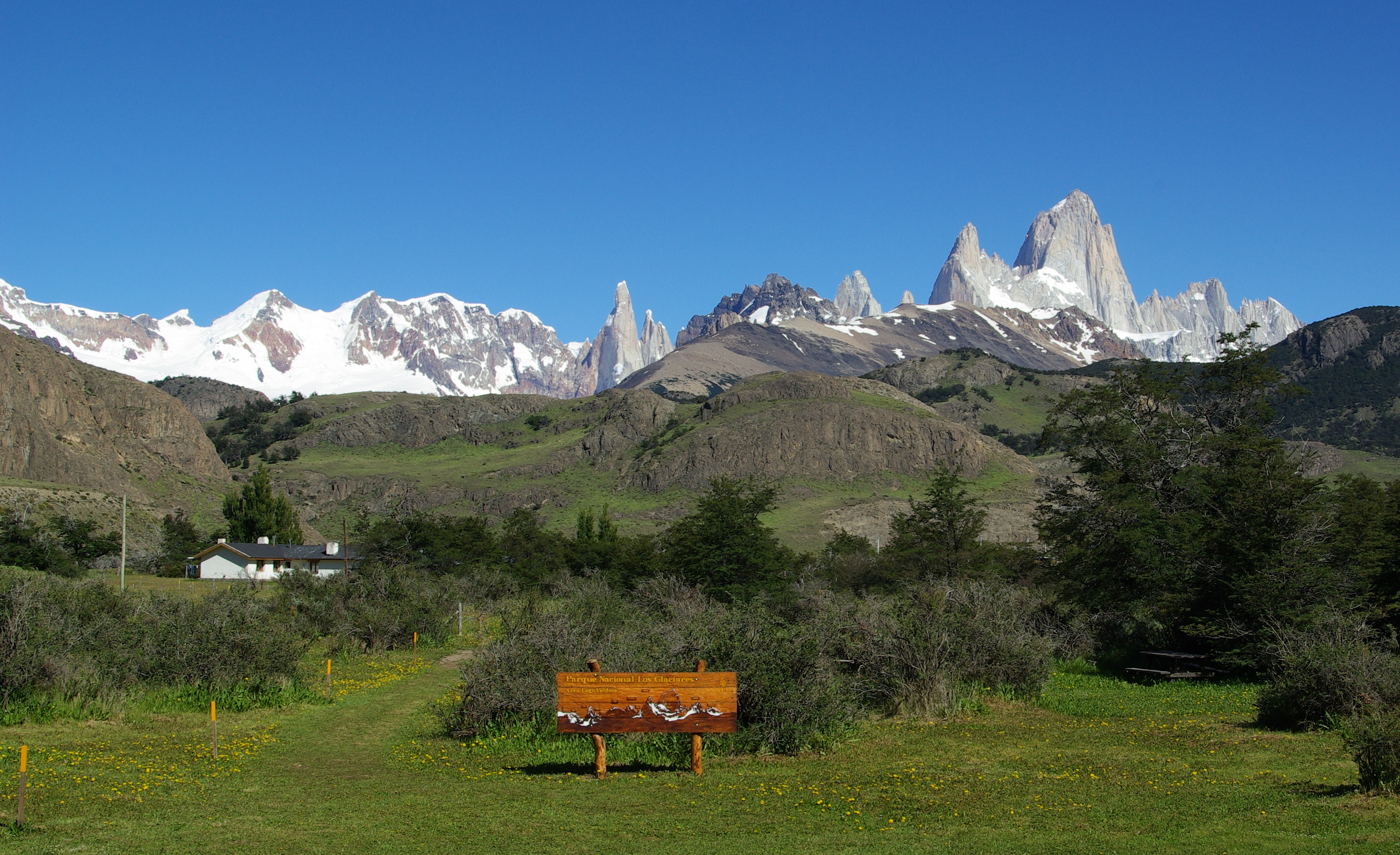
Cerro Adela (left) and Fitz Roy (right)

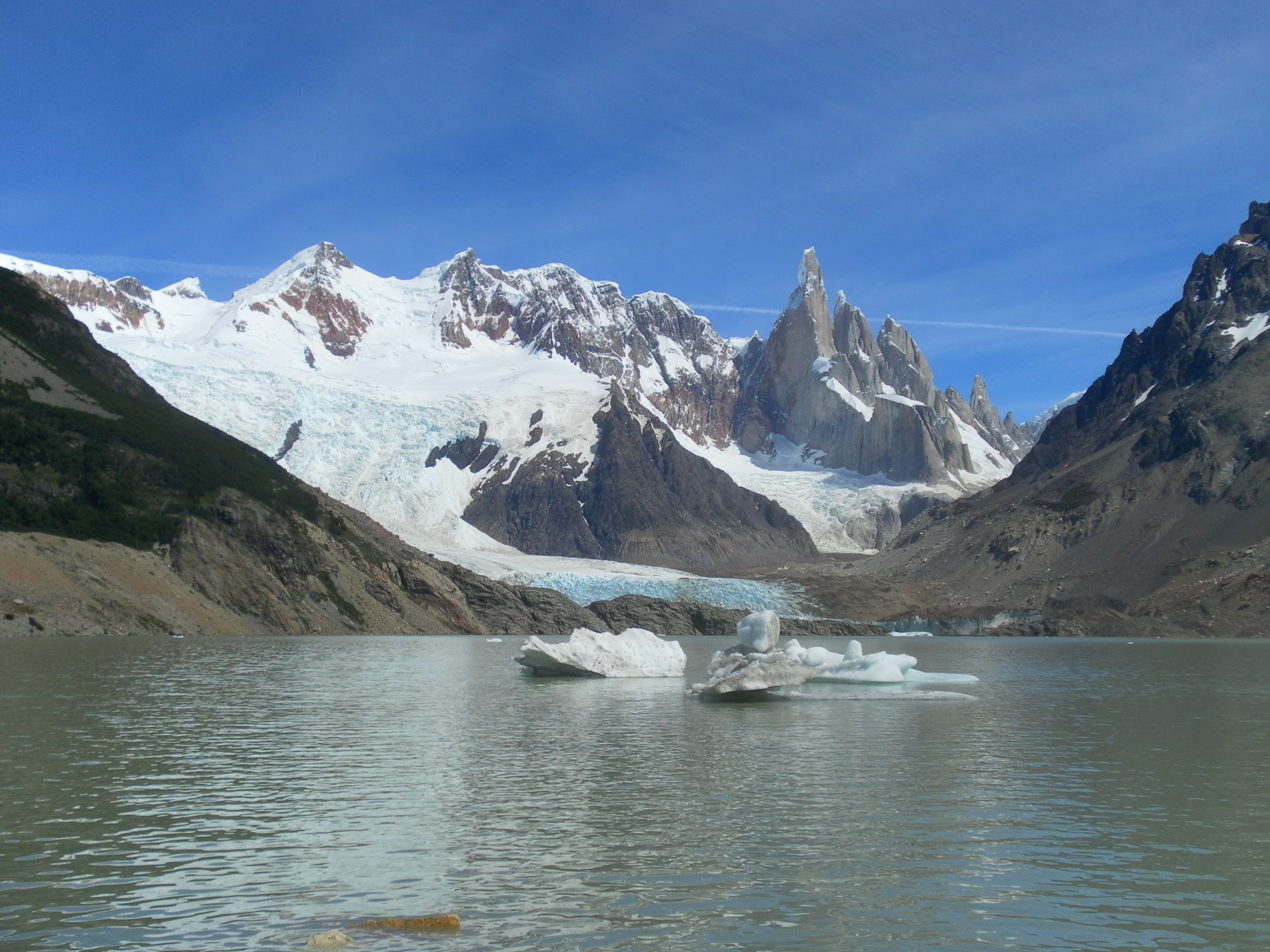
Cerro Adela (left) and Cerro Torre (right) from Laguna Torre

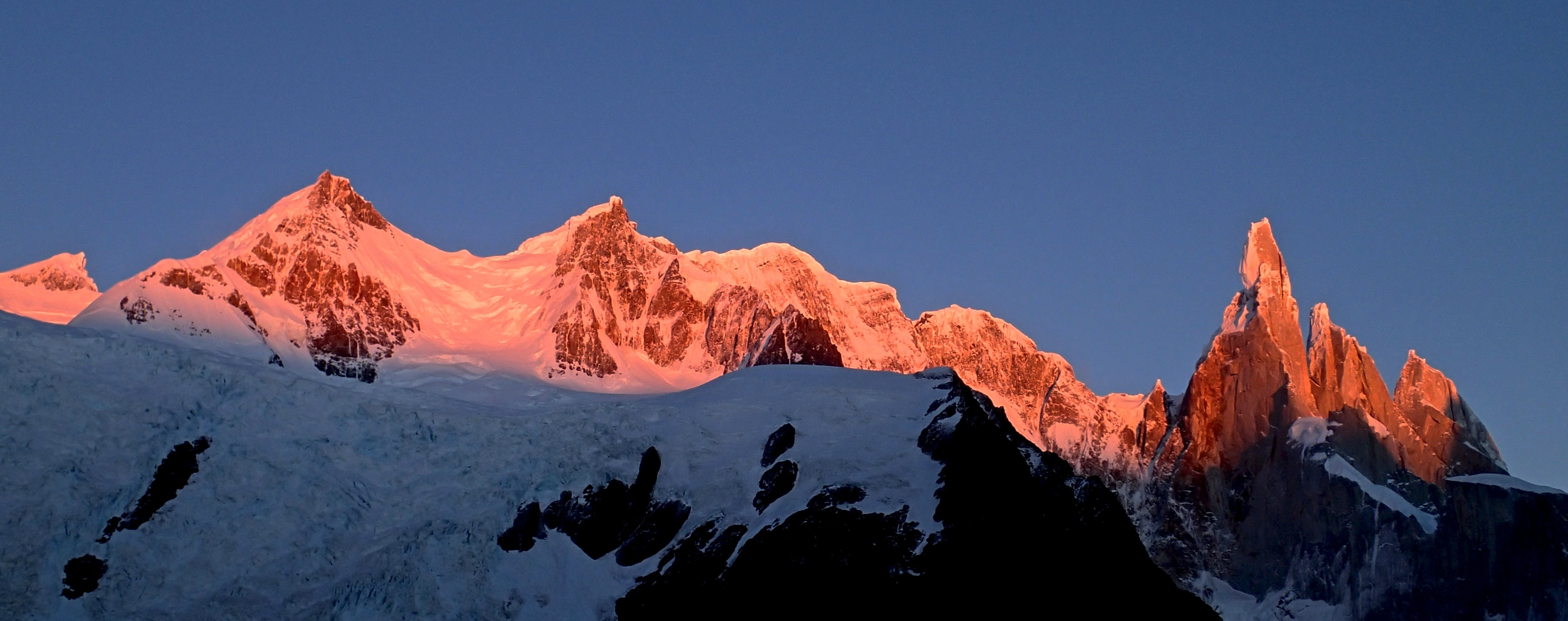
Cerro Ñato, Cerro Adela (centered), Cerro Torre

== See also ==
- List of mountains in Argentina
- Southern Patagonian Ice Field dispute
