= Cerro Grande (Los Glaciares National Park) =

Mountain in Argentina

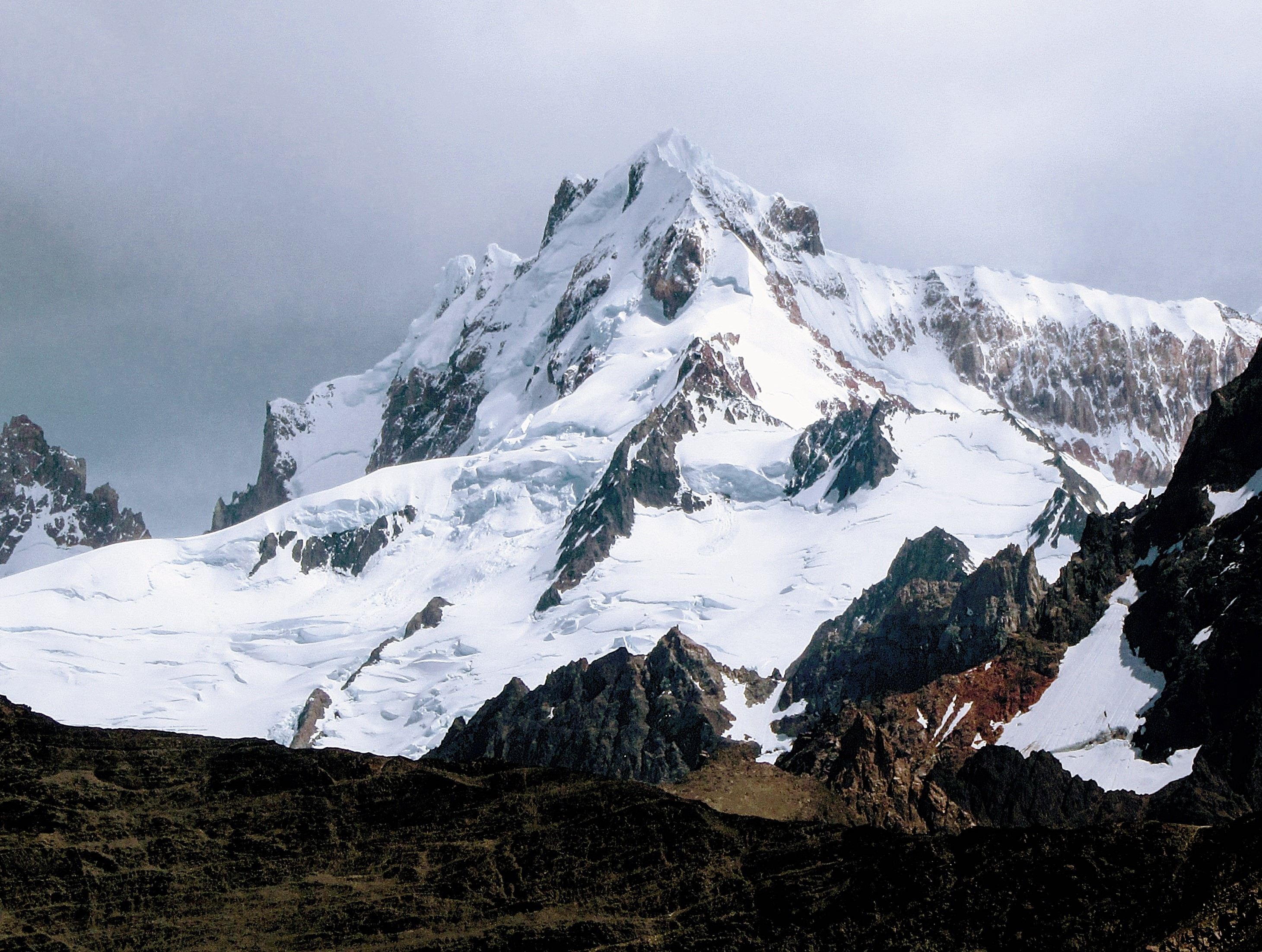
- East aspect

Highest point
- Elevation: 2,751 m (9,026 ft)
- Prominence: 289 m (948 ft)
- Parent peak: Cerro Torre
- Isolation: 2.09 km (1.30 mi)
- Coordinates: 49°20′21″S 73°05′49″W

Geography
- Location within Argentina Location within South America Location within Southern Patagonia
- Interactive map of Cerro Grande
- Country: Argentina
- Province: Santa Cruz
- Protected area: Los Glaciares National Park
- Parent range: Andes
- Topo map: IGN 4769‑III El Chaltén

Geology
- Rock age: Cretaceous
- Rock type: Granite

Climbing
- First ascent: 1958

Cerro Grande is a mountain in Santa Cruz Province, Argentina.

== Description ==
Cerro Grande is a 2,751-meter-elevation (9,026-foot) glaciated summit in the Andes. The peak is located eight kilometers (5 miles) south-southwest of Fitz Roy and 15 kilometers (9.3 miles) west of El Chaltén, in Los Glaciares National Park of Patagonia. It is also within the undefined border area subject to a dispute between Chile and Argentina, whose resolution has been suspended by an agreement in 1998 between the two countries. The Chilean side is in Bernardo O'Higgins National Park and the Magallanes Region. Precipitation runoff from the mountain's slopes drains to Viedma Lake. Topographic relief is significant as the summit rises 2,110 meters (6,922 ft) above Laguna Torre in 5.5 kilometers (3.4 miles), and 1,500 meters (4,921 ft) above the Viedma Glacier in four kilometers (2.5 miles). German explorer Alfred Kölliker mapped and named this mountain during his 1915–16 Buenos Aires Sociedad Científíca Alemana expedition. The Spanish toponym translates as "Big Mountain." The nearest higher peak is Cerro Ñato, 2.09 kilometers (1.3 miles) to the north.

== Climbing history ==
The first ascent of the summit was made in February 1958 by Italians Cesare Maestri, Catullo Detassis, and Marino Stenico via the north ridge. The north face was first climbed by Werner Stucki in January 1991; the east ridge by Thomas Villars in January 1991; the south face by Casimiro Ferrari in March 1993; and the southeast face by Marcello Cominetti and Gianluca Maspes in February 2002.

== Climate ==
According to the Köppen climate classification system, Cerro Grande is located in a tundra climate zone with cold, snowy winters, and cool summers. Weather systems are forced upward by the mountains (orographic lift), causing moisture to drop in the form of rain and snow. This climate supports the Rio Túnel Glacier on the south slope, Grande Glacier on the northeast slope, and the Viedma Glacier to the west. The months of November through March offer the most favorable weather for visiting or climbing in this area.

== Gallery ==
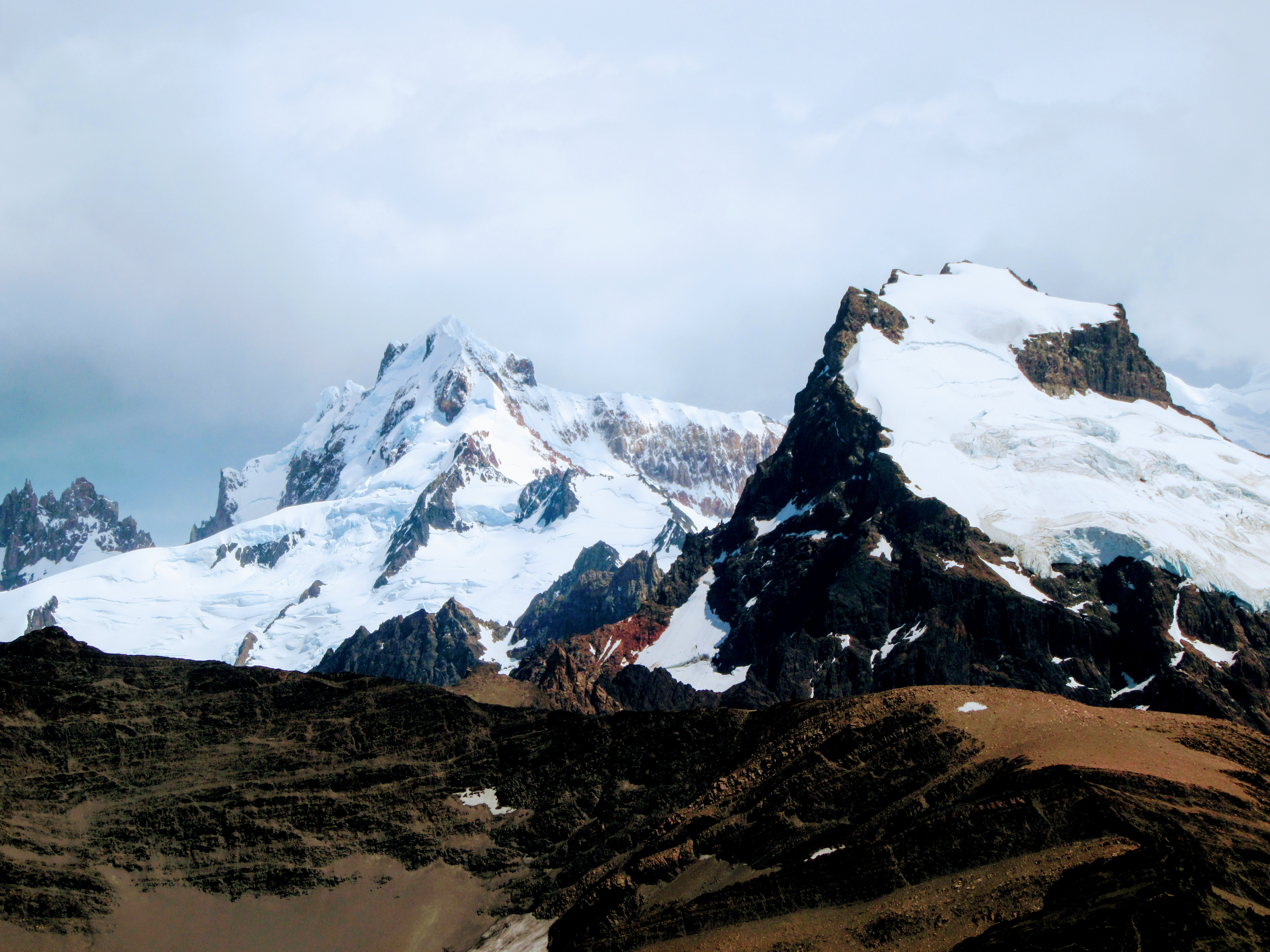
Cerro Grande (left) and Cerro Solo (right)

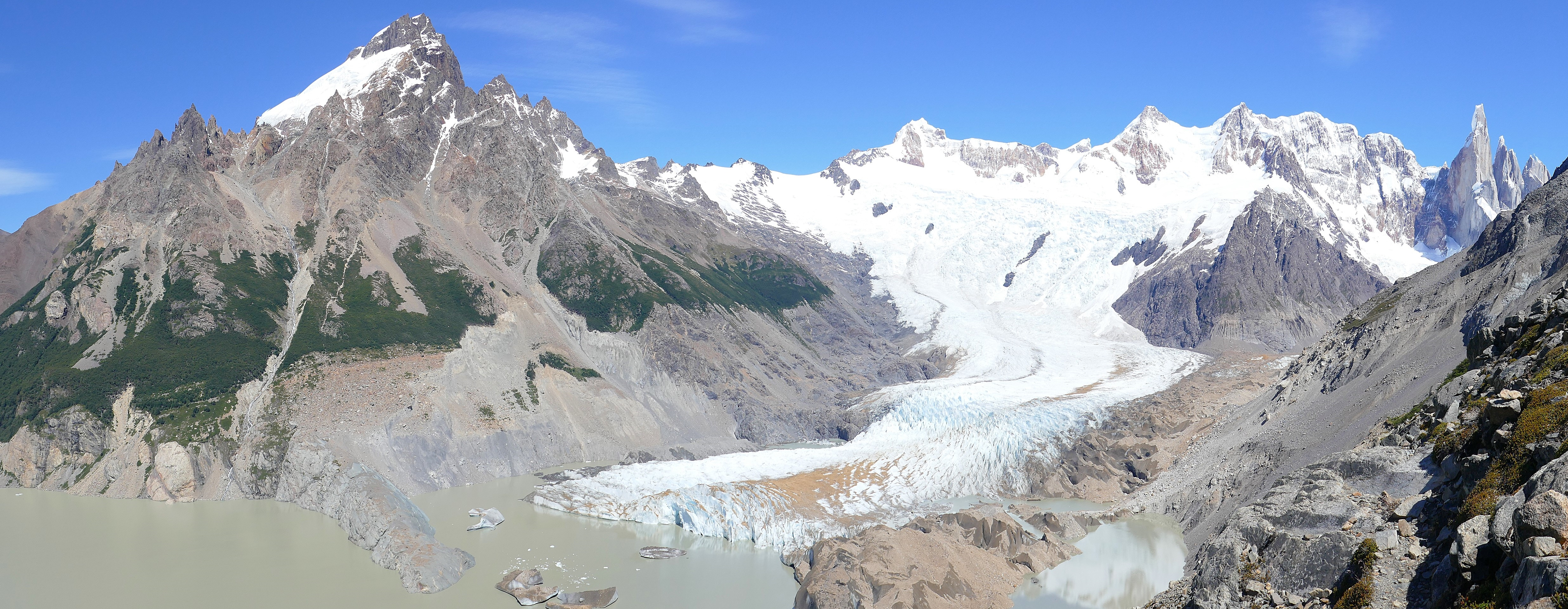
L → R: Laguna Torre, Cerro Solo, Glaciar Grande, Cerro Grande, Cerro Ñato, Cerro Adela, Cerro Torre

== See also ==
- List of mountains in Argentina
- Southern Patagonian Ice Field dispute
