= List of highest points of Mexican states =

This is a list of the highest points of the 31 states and one federal entity (Mexico City) of Mexico, ordered by elevation.

The highest point in Mexico is Pico de Orizaba (5,636 m), a stratovolcano on the border of Veracruz and Puebla, which is also the third-highest peak and tallest volcano in North America.

== List ==
Rank	State	Peak	Height	Image
1	Puebla	Pico de Orizaba	5,636 metres (18,491 ft)	
1	Veracruz	Pico de Orizaba	5,636 metres (18,491 ft)	
3	México	Popocatépetl	5,393 metres (17,694 ft)	
4	Morelos	Popocatépetl	<5,393 metres (17,694 ft) (Note: Morelos extends most of the way up, but not at the summit of, Popocatépetl)	
5	Tlaxcala	Malinche	4,461 metres (14,636 ft)	
6	Jalisco	Nevado de Colima	4,260 metres (13,980 ft)	
7	Chiapas	Volcán Tacaná	4,060 metres (13,320 ft)	
8	Mexico City	Ajusco	3,930 metres (12,890 ft)	
9	Michoacán	Pico de Tancítaro	3,840 metres (12,600 ft)	
10	Colima	Volcán de Colima	3,830 metres (12,570 ft)	
11	Nuevo León	Cerro Potosí	3,747 metres (12,293 ft)	
12	Oaxaca	Cerro Nube Flane	3,721 metres (12,208 ft)	
13	Coahuila	Cerro de la Viga	3,712 metres (12,178 ft)	
14	Guerrero	Cerro Teotepec	3,540 metres (11,610 ft)	
15	Tamaulipas	Cerro Peña Nevada	3,510 metres (11,520 ft)	
16	Hidalgo	Cerro La Peña de Tepozán	3,370 metres (11,060 ft)	
17	Guanajuato	Cerro El Zamorano	3,366 metres (11,043 ft)	
17	Querétaro	Cerro El Zamorano	3,366 metres (11,043 ft)	
19	Durango	Cerro Gordo	3,352 metres (10,997 ft)	
20	Chihuahua	Cerro Mohinora	3,300 metres (10,800 ft)	
21	Zacatecas	Cerro El Refugio	3,200 metres (10,500 ft)	
22	San Luis Potosí	Cerro Grande	3,170 metres (10,400 ft)	
23	Baja California	Picacho del Diablo	3,090 metres (10,140 ft)	
24	Aguascalientes	Sierra Fría	3,020 metres (9,910 ft)	
25	Sinaloa	Sinaloa High Point	2,920 metres (9,580 ft)	
26	Nayarit	Cerro Del Faro	2,760 metres (9,060 ft)	
27	Sonora	Cerro Pico Guacamayas	2,620 metres (8,600 ft)	
28	Baja California Sur	Sierra La Laguna High Point	2,080 metres (6,820 ft)	
29	Tabasco	Tabasco High Point	1,140 metres (3,740 ft)	
30	Campeche	Cerro Champerico	390 metres (1,280 ft)	
31	Quintana Roo	Cerro El Charro	240 metres (790 ft)	
32	Yucatán	Cerro Benito Juaréz	210 metres (690 ft)	
