= Cerro Solo (Los Glaciares National Park) =

Mountain in Argentina

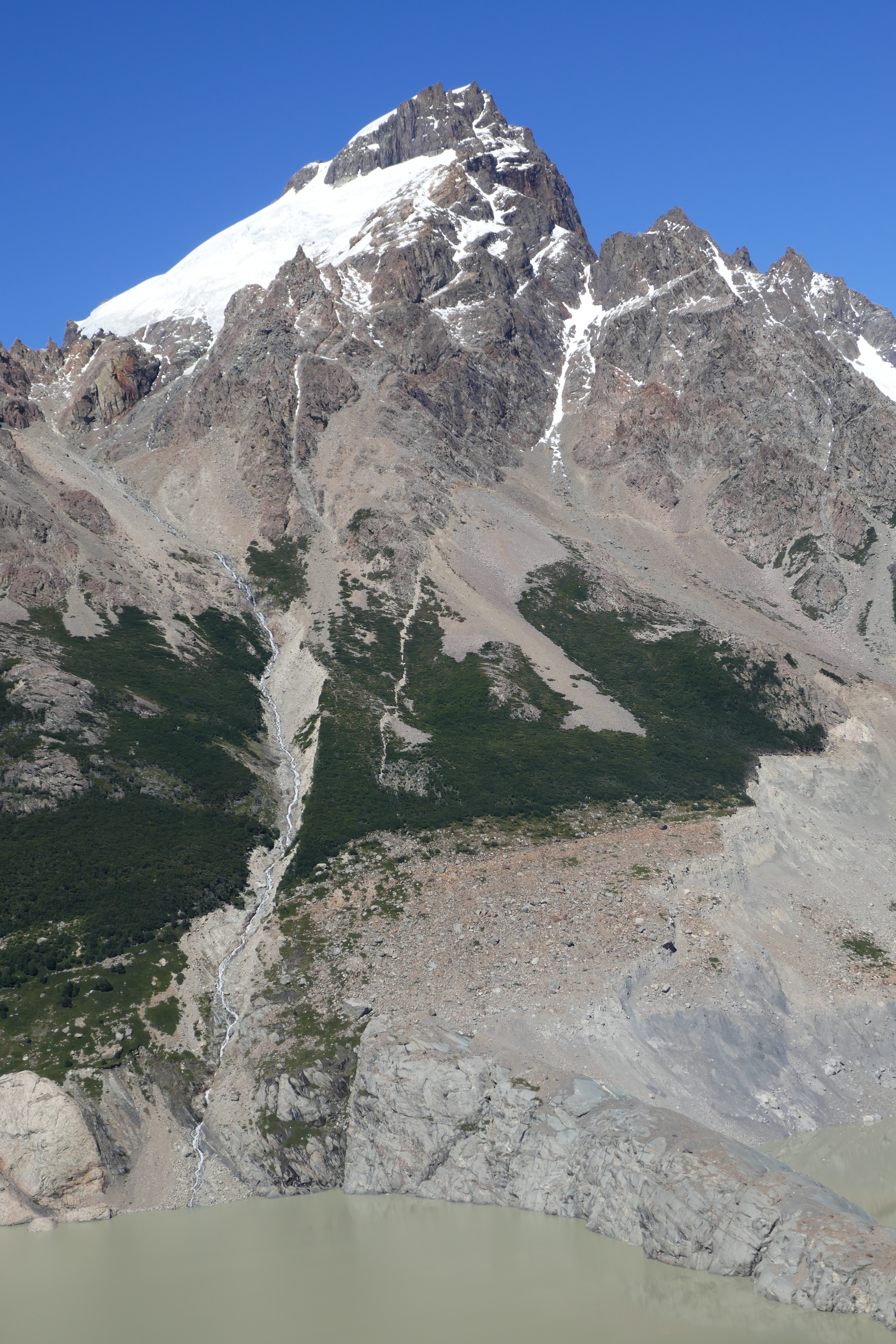
- Northeast aspect

Highest point
- Elevation: 2,213 m (7,260 ft)
- Prominence: 488 m (1,601 ft)
- Parent peak: Fitz Roy
- Isolation: 3.38 km (2.10 mi)
- Coordinates: 49°20′34″S 73°01′46″W

Geography
- Location within Argentina Location within South America Location within Southern Patagonia
- Interactive map of Cerro Solo
- Country: Argentina
- Province: Santa Cruz
- Protected area: Los Glaciares National Park
- Parent range: Andes
- Topo map: IGN 4769‑III El Chaltén

Climbing
- First ascent: 1949

Cerro Solo is a mountain in Santa Cruz Province, Argentina.

== Description ==
Cerro Solo is a 2,213-meter-elevation (7,260-foot) summit in the Andes. The peak is located eight kilometers (5 miles) south of Fitz Roy and 10 kilometers (6 miles) west of El Chaltén, in Los Glaciares National Park of Patagonia. Precipitation runoff from the mountain's slopes drains to Viedma Lake. Topographic relief is significant as the summit rises 1,570 meters (5,151 ft) above Laguna Torre in two kilometers (1.24 miles). The first ascent of Cerro Solo was made on February 14, 1949, by Roberto Matzi and Enrique Sabatte. The nearest higher peak is Cerro Grande, five kilometers (3.1 miles) to the west.

== Climate ==
According to the Köppen climate classification system, Cerro Solo is located in a tundra climate zone with cold, snowy winters, and cool summers. Weather systems are forced upward by the mountains (orographic lift), causing moisture to drop in the form of rain and snow. This climate supports small glaciers on the east and southwest slopes. The months of November through March offer the most favorable weather for climbing in this area.

== Gallery ==
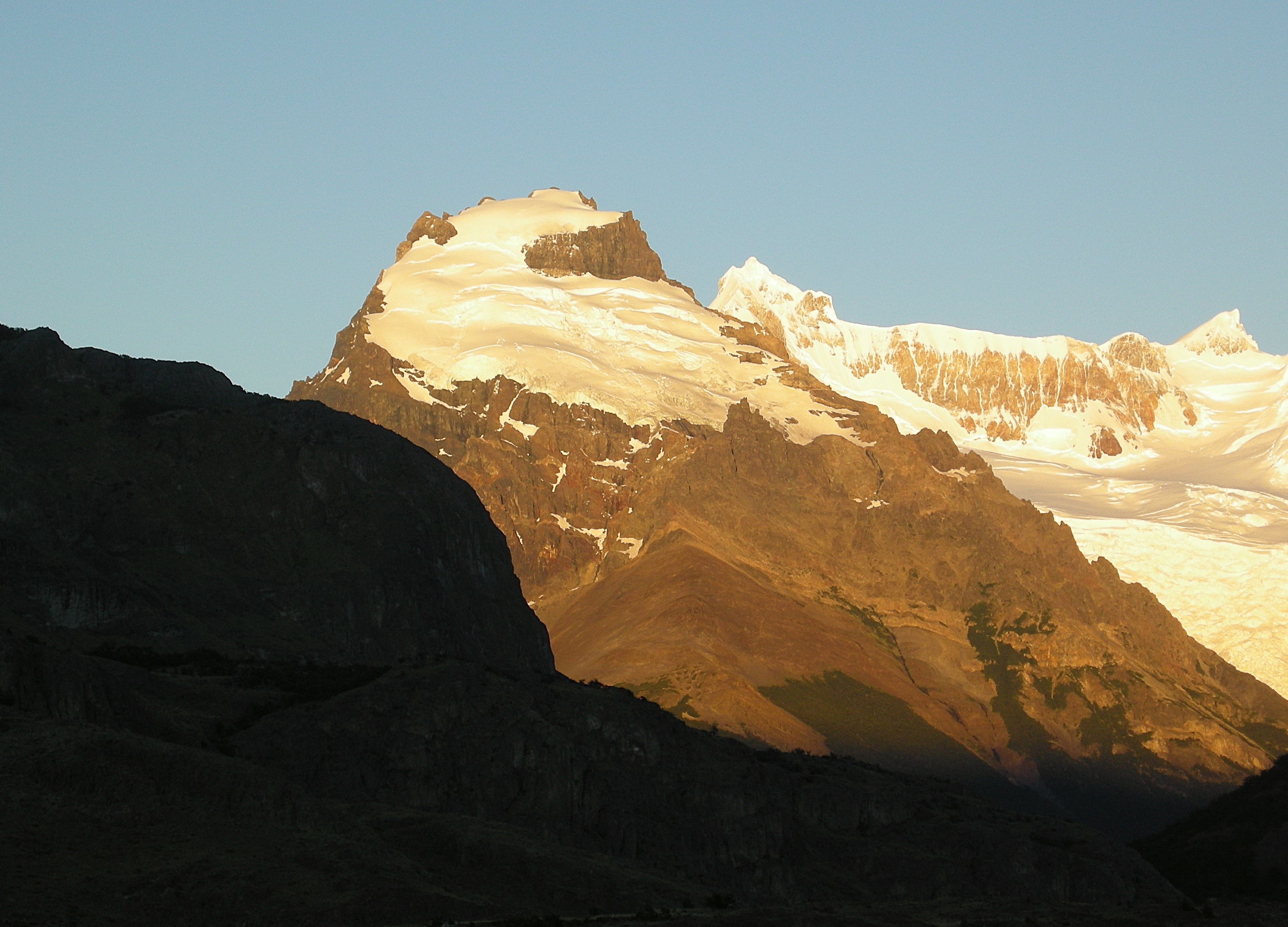
East aspect at sunrise (Cerro Grande behind)

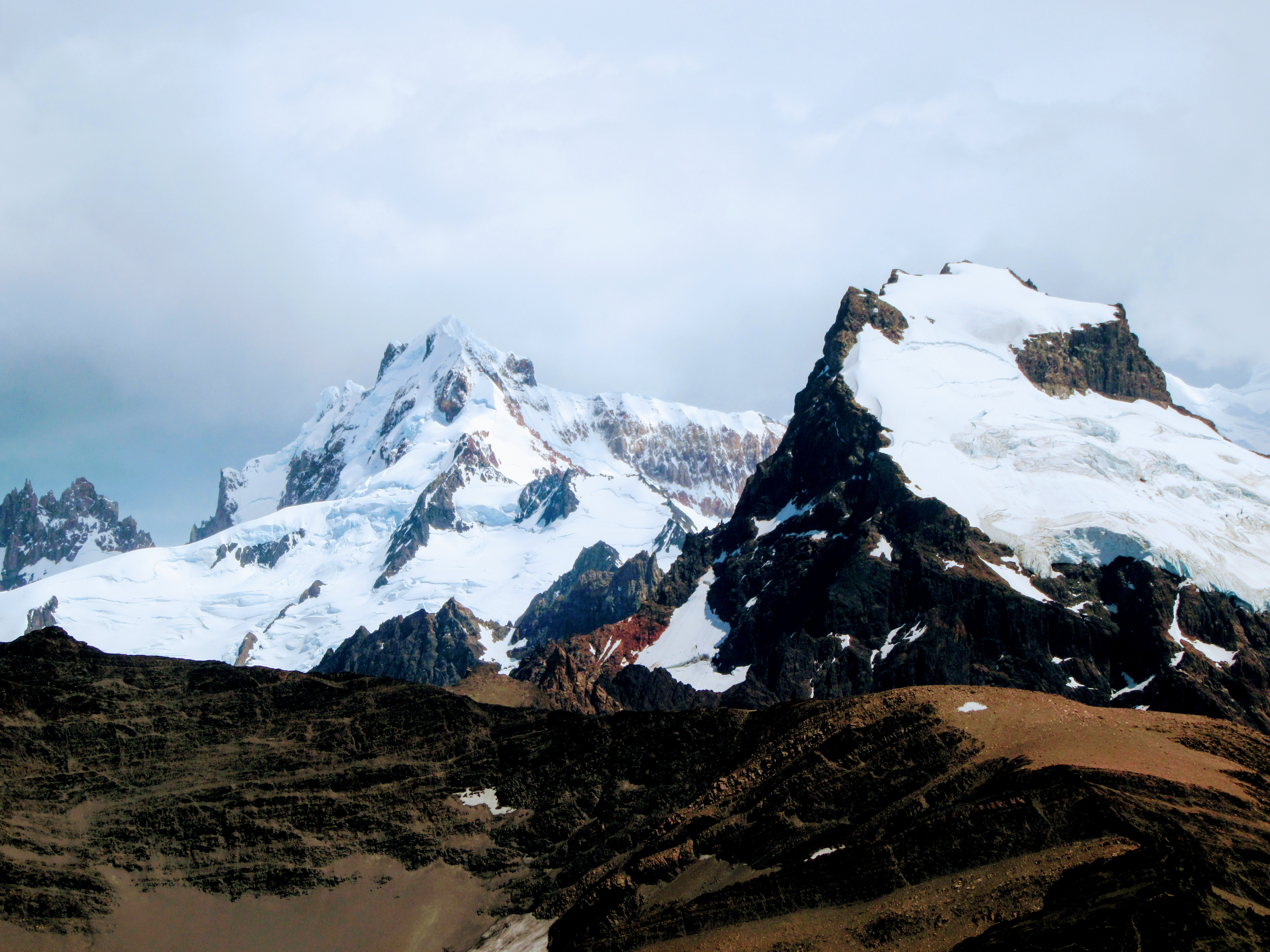
Cerro Grande (left) and Cerro Solo (right)

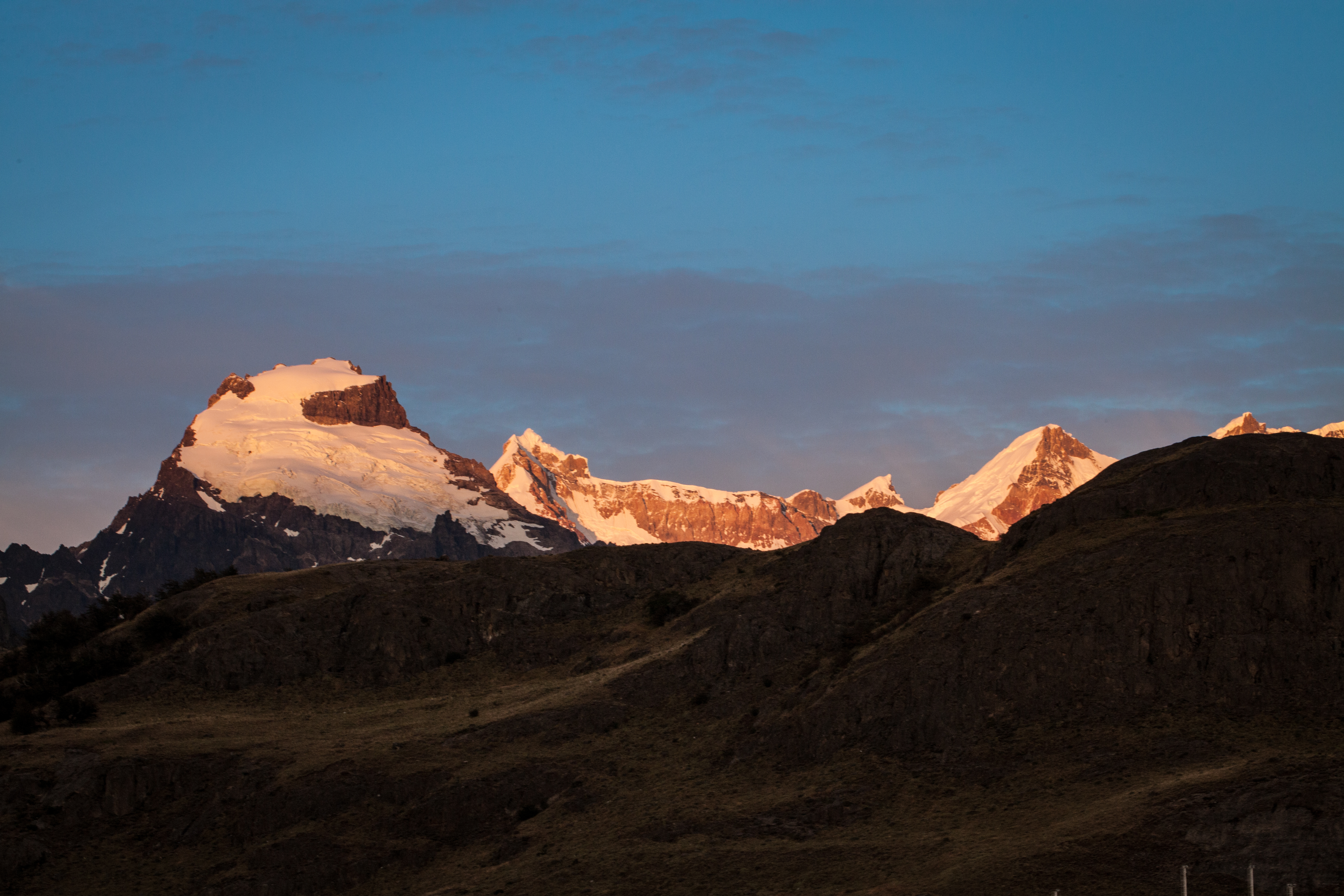
Cerro Solo to left

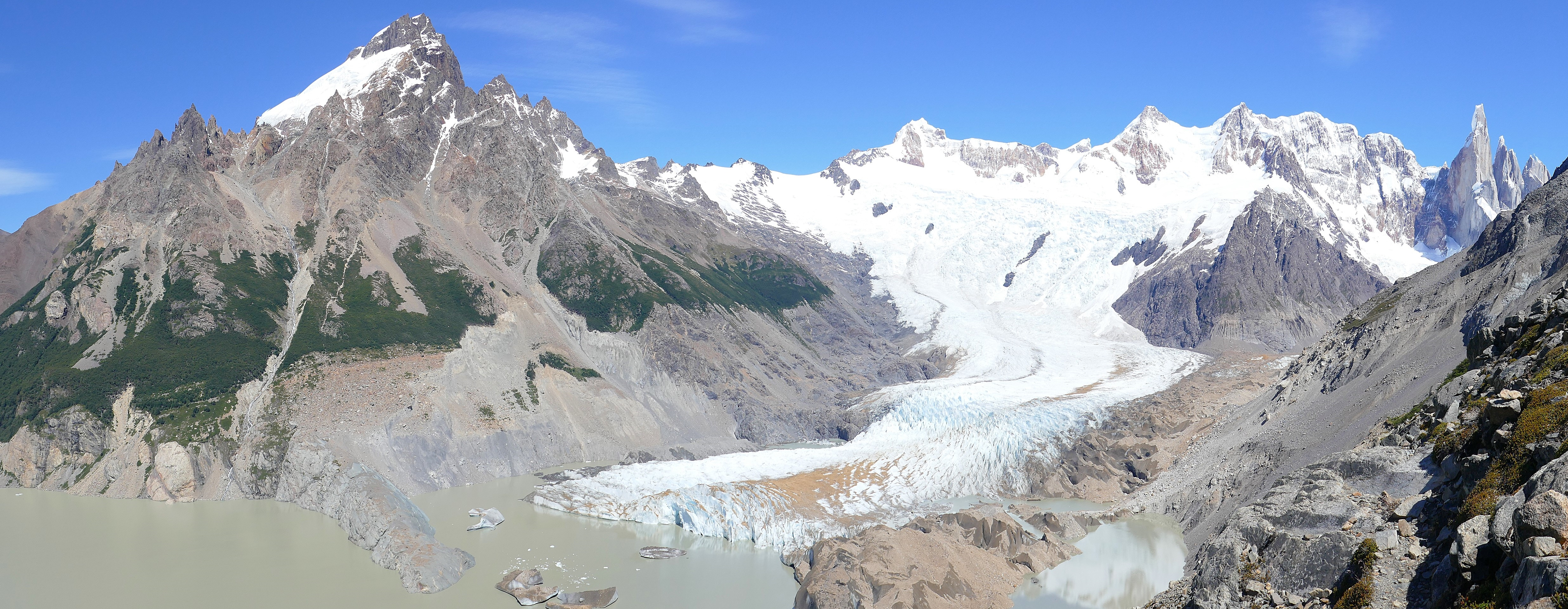
L→R: Laguna Torre, Cerro Solo, Glaciar Grande, Cerro Grande, Cerro Ñato, Cerro Adela, Cerro Torre

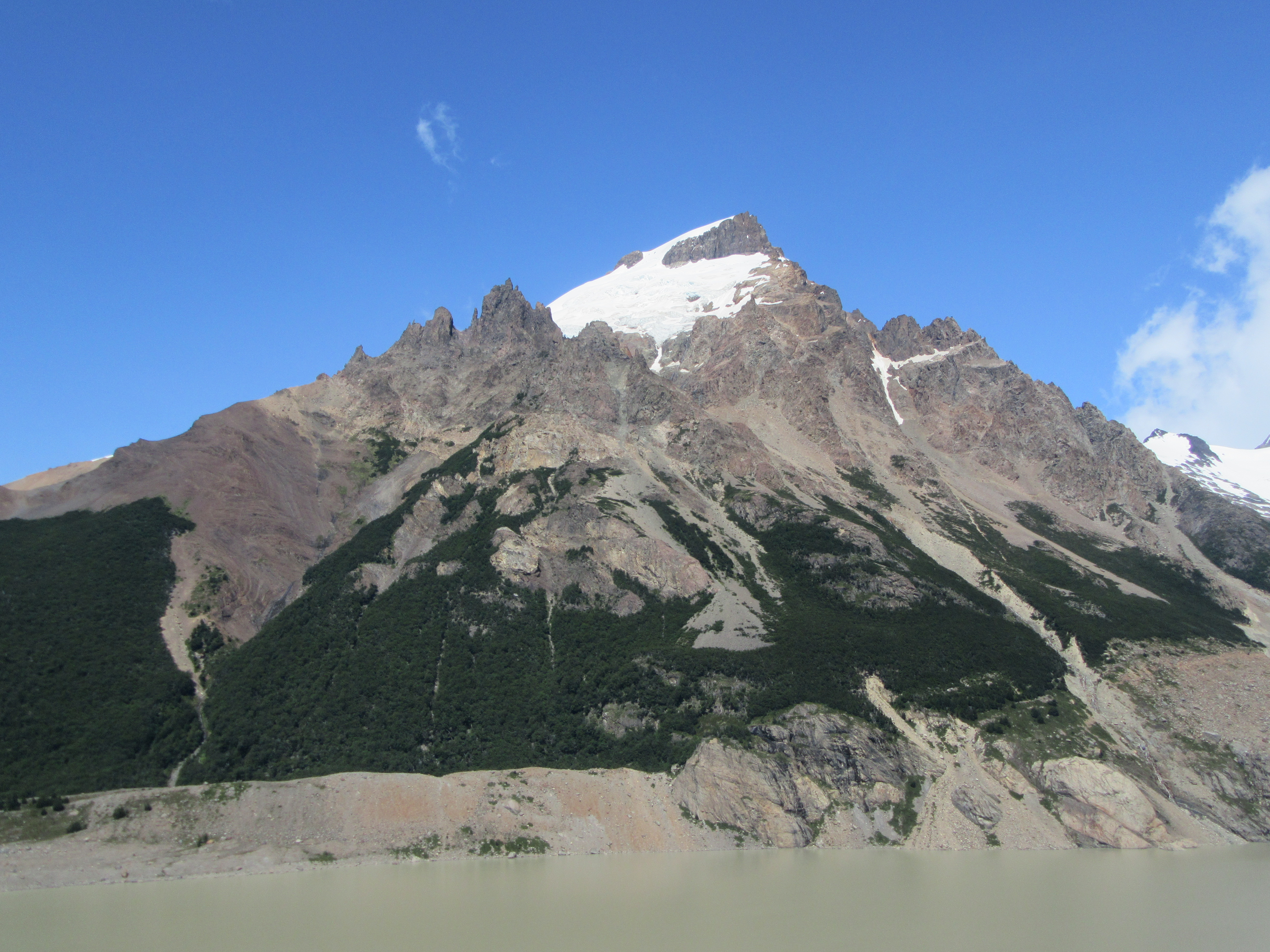
Cerro Solo rises above Laguna Torre

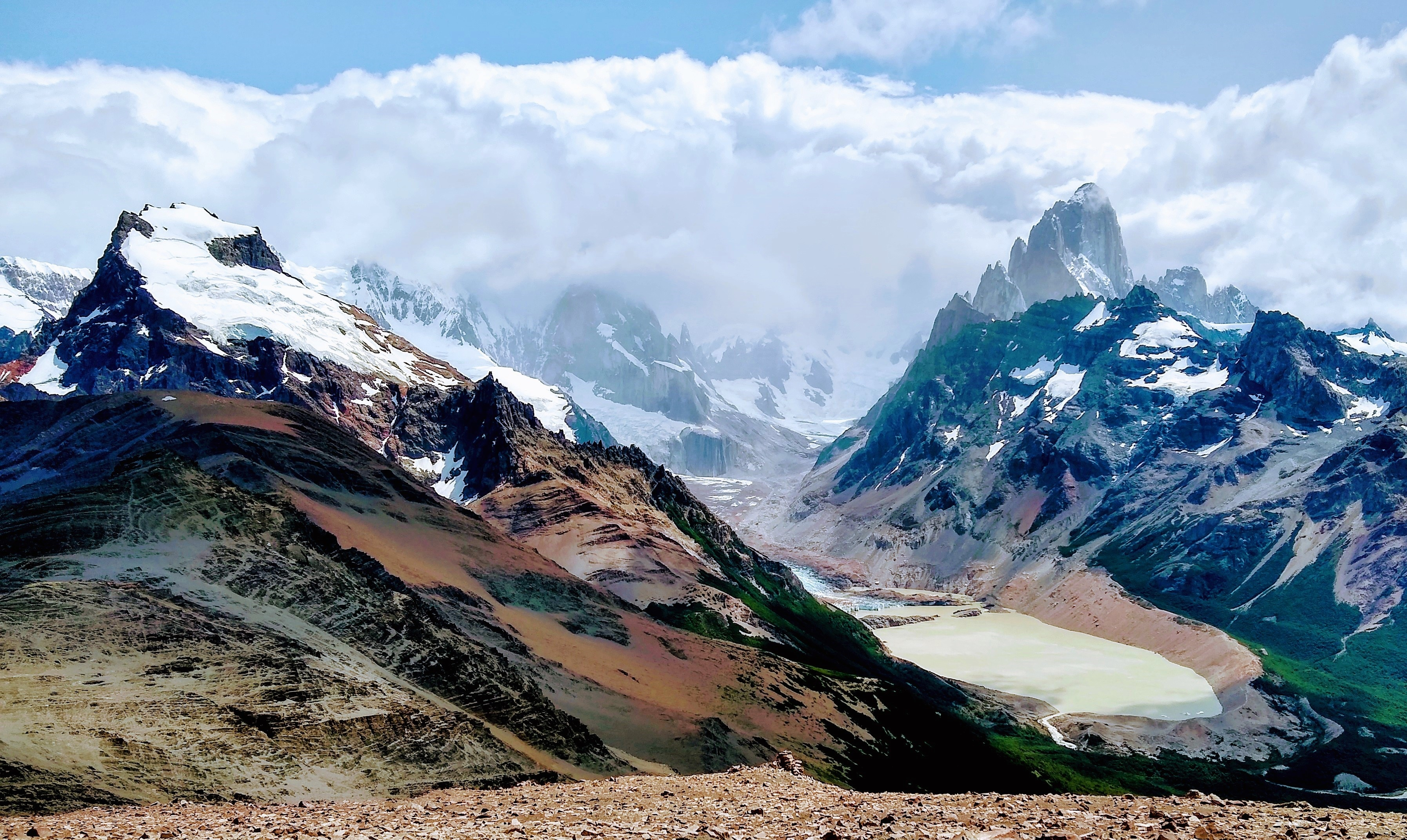
Cerro Solo (left), Laguna Torre, and Fitz Roy (right)

== See also ==
- List of mountains in Argentina
