= Cerro Grande =

Cerro Grande (Spanish for "big hill") may refer to:

== Mountains ==
- Cerro Grande (New Mexico), a summit near Los Alamos, New Mexico that was the starting point of a major forest fire in May 2000
- Cerro Grande (Chihuahua), a prominent mountain overlooking Chihuahua City
- Cerro Grande (San Luis Potosí), a mountain in San Luis Potosí
- Cerro Ciénaga Grande, a mountain in the Salta Province of Argentina
- Cerro Grande (La Serena), a mountain in the Coquimbo Region of Chile
- Cerro Grande (Los Glaciares National Park), a mountain in Patagonia

== Other places ==
- Cerro Grande, Rio Grande do Sul, a municipality in Mesoregion Noroeste Rio-Grandense, Rio Grande do Sul, Brazil
- Cerro Grande do Sul, a municipality in Mesoregion Metropolitana de Porto Alegre. Rio Grande do Sul, Brazil
