= Cerro Gordo =

Cerro Gordo (Spanish meaning: "Fat Hill") may refer to:

== Places ==
=== Mexico ===
- Cerro Gordo (Mexibús), a BRT station in Ecatepec, Mexico
- Cerro Gordo, mountain north of Teotihuacan
- Cerro Gordo, Sierra de Guadalupe
- Cerro Gordo, Sierra Madre Occidental

=== Spain ===
- Cerro Gordo, a dormant volcano in the Campo de Calatrava Volcanic Field

=== United States ===
- Cerrogordo, Florida
- Cerro Gordo, Illinois
- Cerro Gordo, Minnesota
- Cerro Gordo Township, Minnesota
- Cerro Gordo, North Carolina
- Cerro Gordo, Aguada, Puerto Rico, a neighborhood
- Cerro Gordo, Añasco, Puerto Rico, a neighborhood
- Cerro Gordo, Bayamón, Puerto Rico, a neighborhood
- Cerro Gordo, Moca, Puerto Rico, a neighborhood
- Cerro Gordo, San Lorenzo, Puerto Rico, a neighborhood
- Cerro Gordo, Tennessee
- Cerro Gordo County, Iowa
- Cerro Gordo, California, east of the Owens Valley
  - Cerro Gordo Mines in Inyo County, California
- Cerro Gordo River, a branch of New River (Broward County, Florida)

== Other ==
- The Battle of Cerro Gordo in the Mexican–American War
