= Viedma Glacier =

Glacier in Patagonia

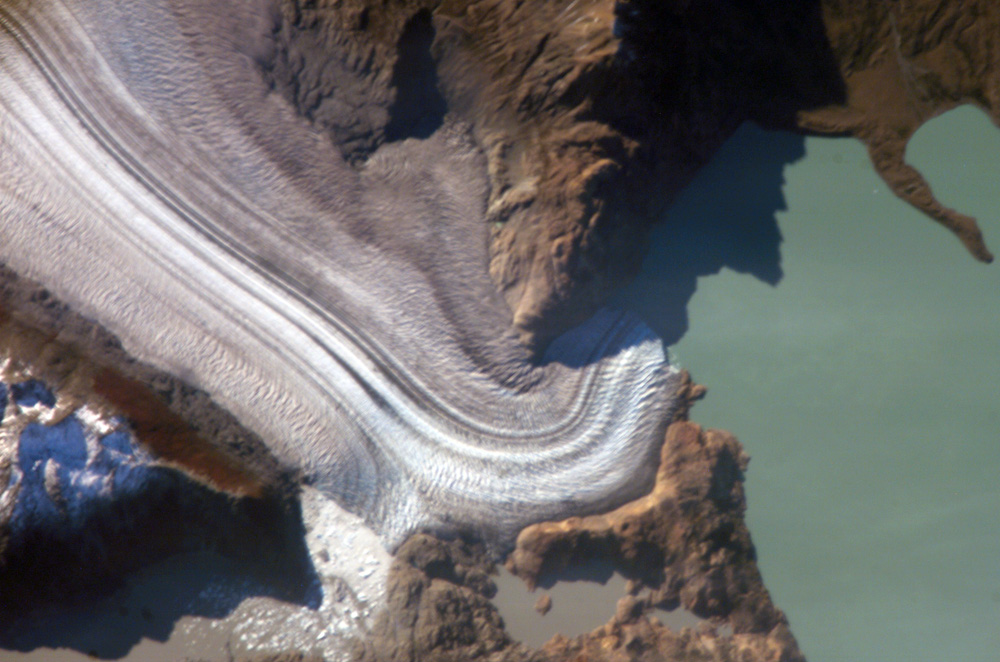
- The Viedma glacier (tan) flows into Lake Viedma (light blue). (NASA)

- Location within Southern Patagonia
- Type: Valley glacier
- Location: Santa Cruz Province, Argentina; Magallanes y la Antártica Chilena, Chile
- Coordinates: 49°27′36″S 73°11′42″W
- Terminus: Lake Viedma

Viedma Glacier is a large glacier that is part of the huge Southern Patagonian Ice Field, located at the southern end of mainland South America. Viedma Glacier is a valley glacier and its moraine-rich terminus flows into the western end of Lake Viedma, which is fed primarily by its melting ice. Viedma Glacier is located in the undefined part of the limit between Chile and Argentina, in Argentinian legislature it is in Los Glaciares National Park which was declared a World Heritage Site in 1981. in Chilean legislature part of it is in Bernardo O'Higgins National Park. The Southern Patagonian Ice Field is 13,000 square kilometres (5,000 sq mi); Viedma Glacier is one of the Ice Field's 48 outlet glaciers that have more than 20 square kilometres (7.7 sq mi) of ice field area each.

== Glacier terminus ==
Viedma Glacier's glacier terminus is about 2 kilometres (1.2 mi) wide at the point it enters Lake Viedma. Chunks of ice fall off the terminus and float off into the lake, eventually melting. Glacial moraines are glacial debris of soil and rock that collect in front of, and along the sides of, the glacier as it flows across the land.

The dark parallel lines inside the white central mass of the Viedma Glacier show where the debris-filled moraines have become entwined within the center of the new glacial ice mass as it forms. At right angles to the glacial moraines in the middle, crevasses, large, canyon-sized cracks, are apparent in the grey-brown ice that can be seen along the sides of the glacier. These cracks are formed from the stress arising between ice along the valley walls (that is slower moving as the friction is greater) and the relatively fast moving ice at the glacier's center. On the southwestern side of the glacier terminus, calving of ice is visible. The glacier terminus ends in a cliff.
