= Laguna Torre =

Lake in Argentina

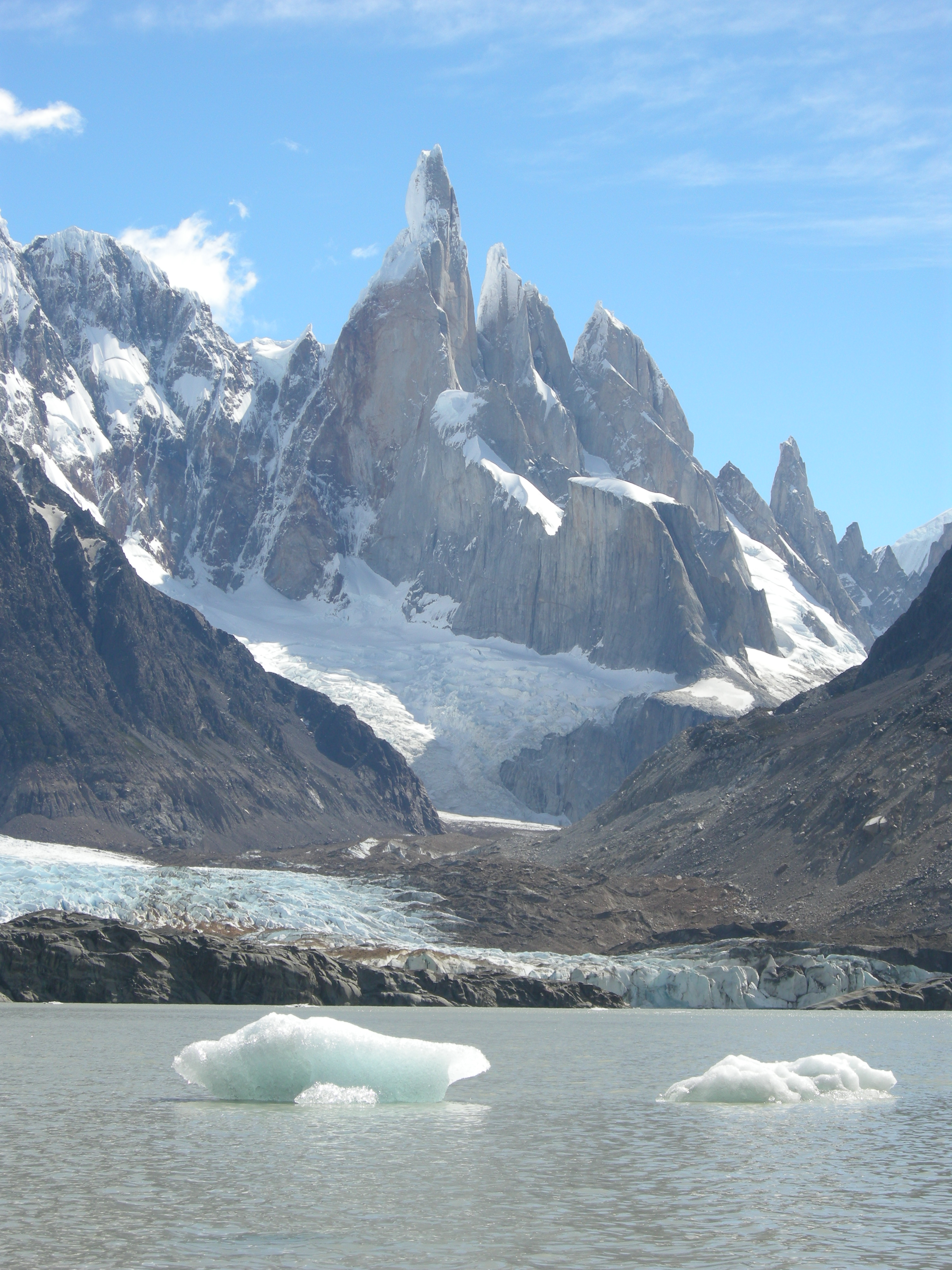
- Laguna Torre with Cerro Torre (east face) in the background, 2010.

- Location within Santa Cruz Province
- Location: Southern Patagonian Ice Field
- Coordinates: 49°19′30″S 73°00′02″W

The Laguna Torre lake is located in the Los Glaciares National Park, Santa Cruz Province, Argentina. It is formed from glacial melt water and is a popular site for hikers and climbers to see surroundings peaks, including the east face of Cerro Torre.

The glacial lake is sited approximately 10 km west of the El Chaltén tourist village, from which it can be easily accessed by hikers between the months October to April as a day-hike.

In December 2025, a paper studying the increased risk of a glacial lake outburst flood (GLOF) was published, highlighting how the continued change of the landscape from glacial to para-glacial environment increases the risk of event happening. Around the same time, a local advisory committee decided to change the routing of the Sendero Laguna Torre hiking path within the national park, to avoid areas of particular risk, including moving a campground further away from the Rio Fitz Roy.

== Gallery ==
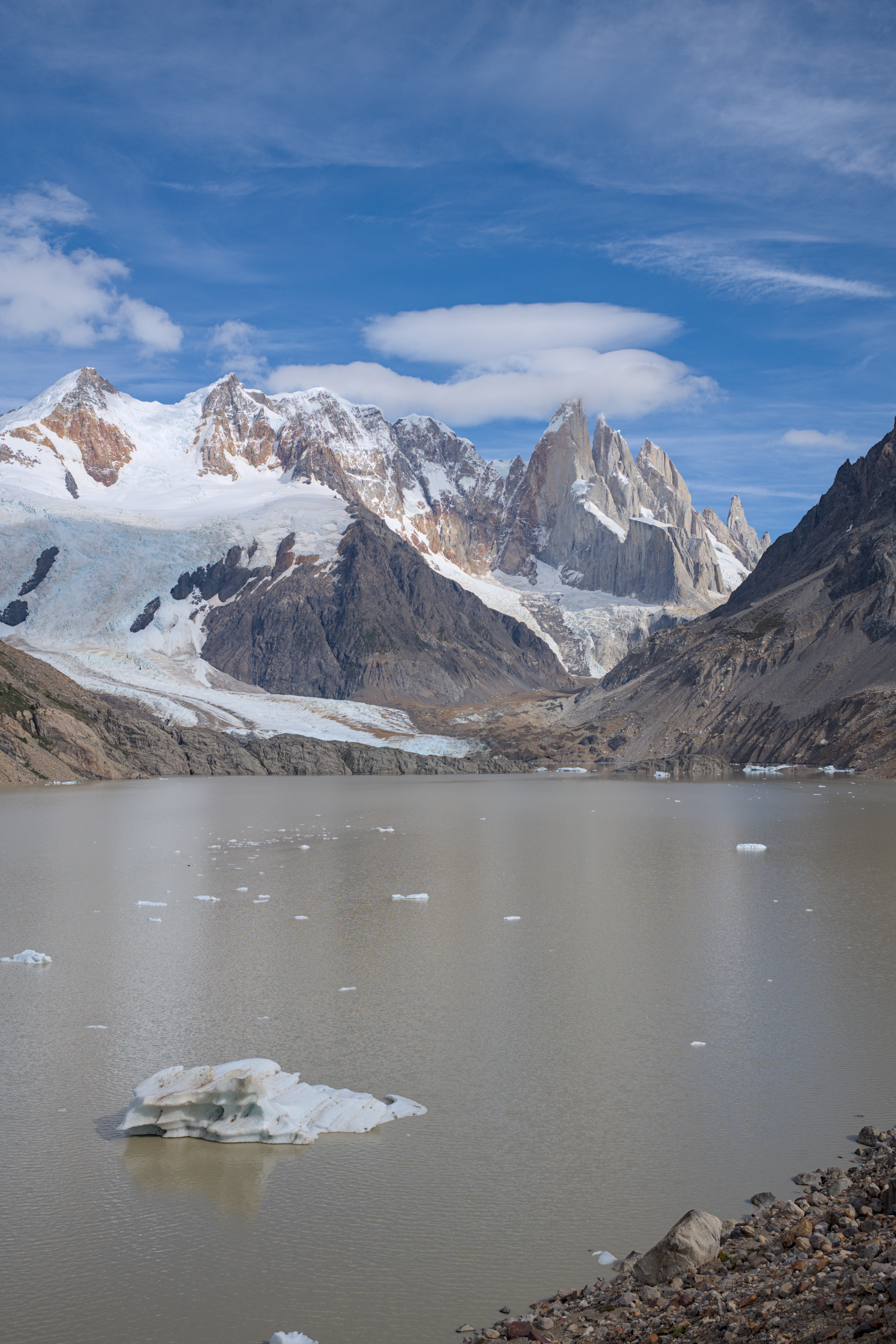

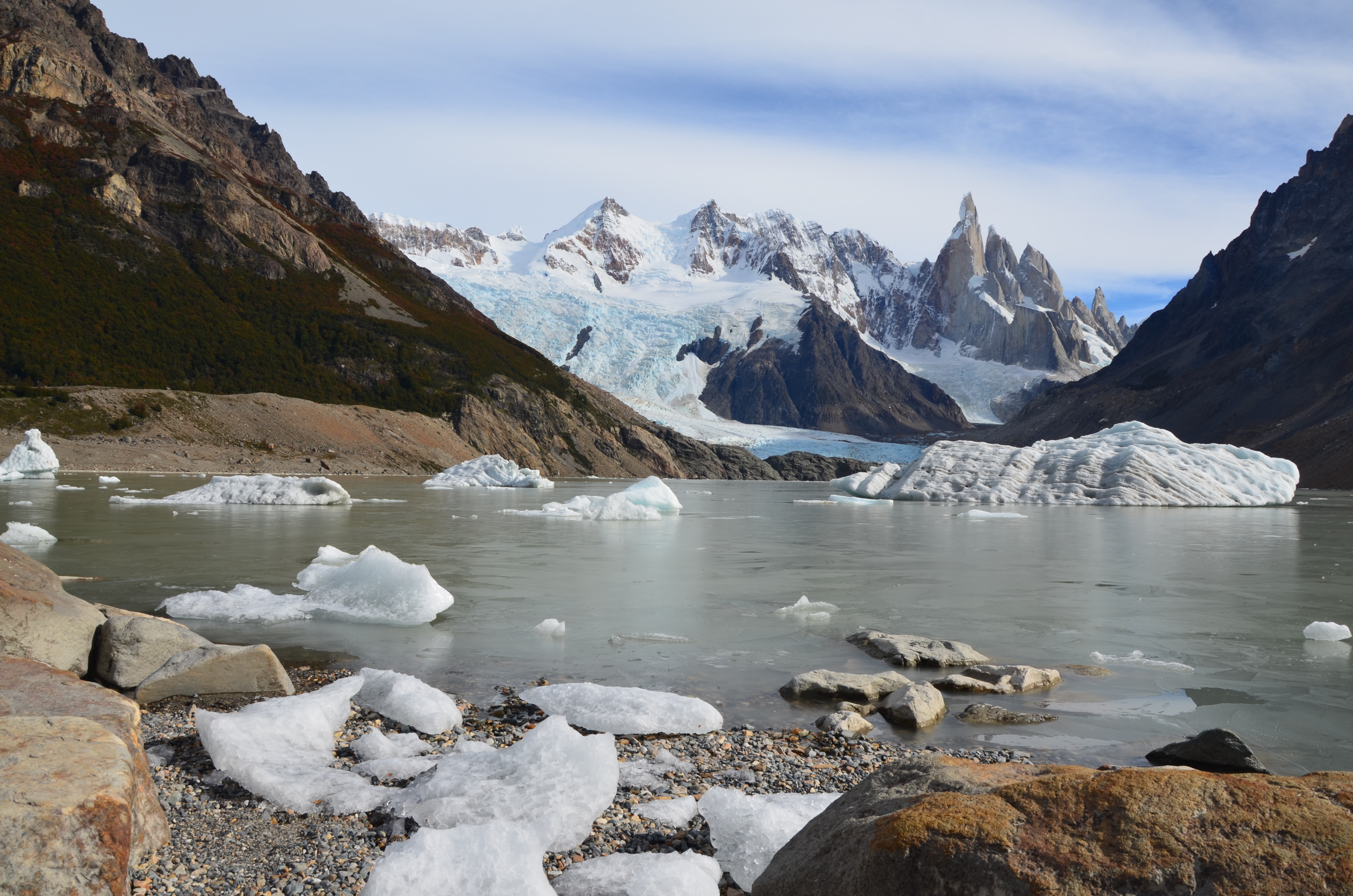

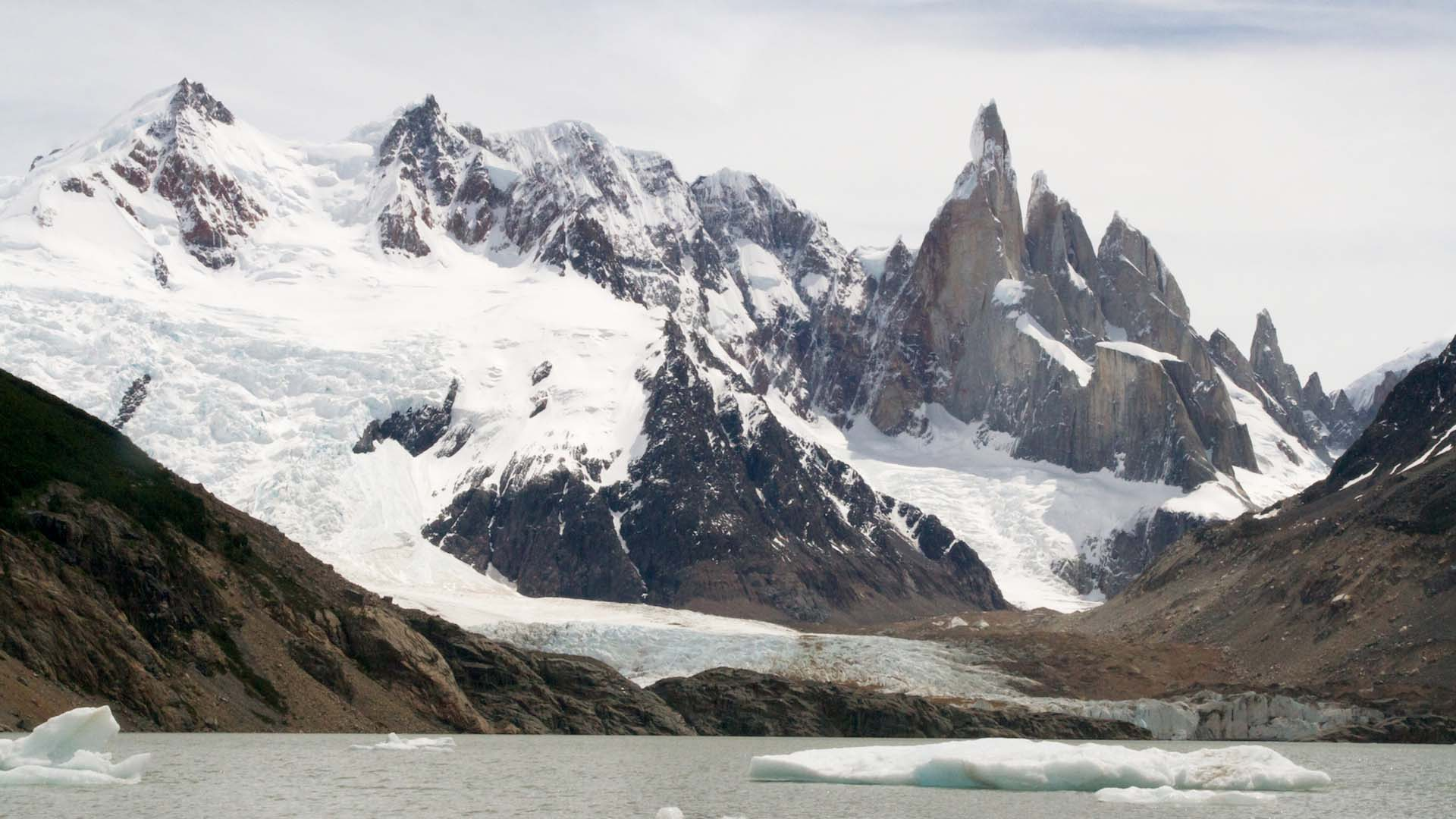
