= Viedma Lake =

Lake in Santa Cruz province, Argentina

- Lago Viedma (Spanish)
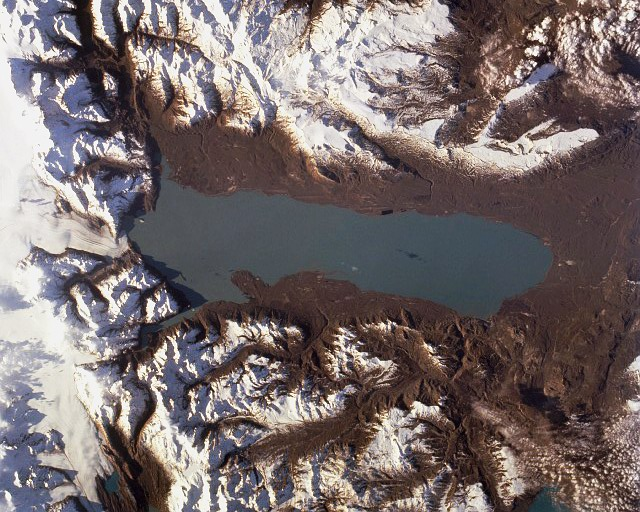
- from space, October 1994

- Location within Santa Cruz Province Location within Argentina Location within Southern Patagonia
- Location: Lago Argentino Department, Santa Cruz Province (Argentina)
- Coordinates: 49°35′S 72°30′W
- Type: periglacial lake
- Primary inflows: Viedma Glacier
- Primary outflows: La Leona River
- Catchment area: 7,342 km^{2} (2,835 sq mi)
- Basin countries: Argentina, Chile
- Max. length: 80 km (50 mi)
- Max. width: 15 km (9.3 mi)
- Surface area: 1,193 km^{2} (461 sq mi)
- Average depth: 100 m (330 ft)
- Max. depth: ~900 m (3,000 ft)
- Water volume: 119 km^{3} (29 cu mi)
- Shore length^{1}: 291 km (181 mi)
- Surface elevation: 252 m (827 ft)
- ^{1} Shore length is not a well-defined measure.

Viedma Lake (Spanish: Lago Viedma, Spanish pronunciation: [laɣo ˈβjeðma]) is a Patagonian lake in the province of Santa Cruz, Argentina, situated near its border with Chile. Measuring approximately 50 miles (80 km) in length, it is a major elongated trough lake formed from melting glacial ice. Viedma Lake is the deepest lake in the Americas and the fifth deepest in the world, with a depth of 900 meters, and is the second largest perennial lake located entirely within Argentina.

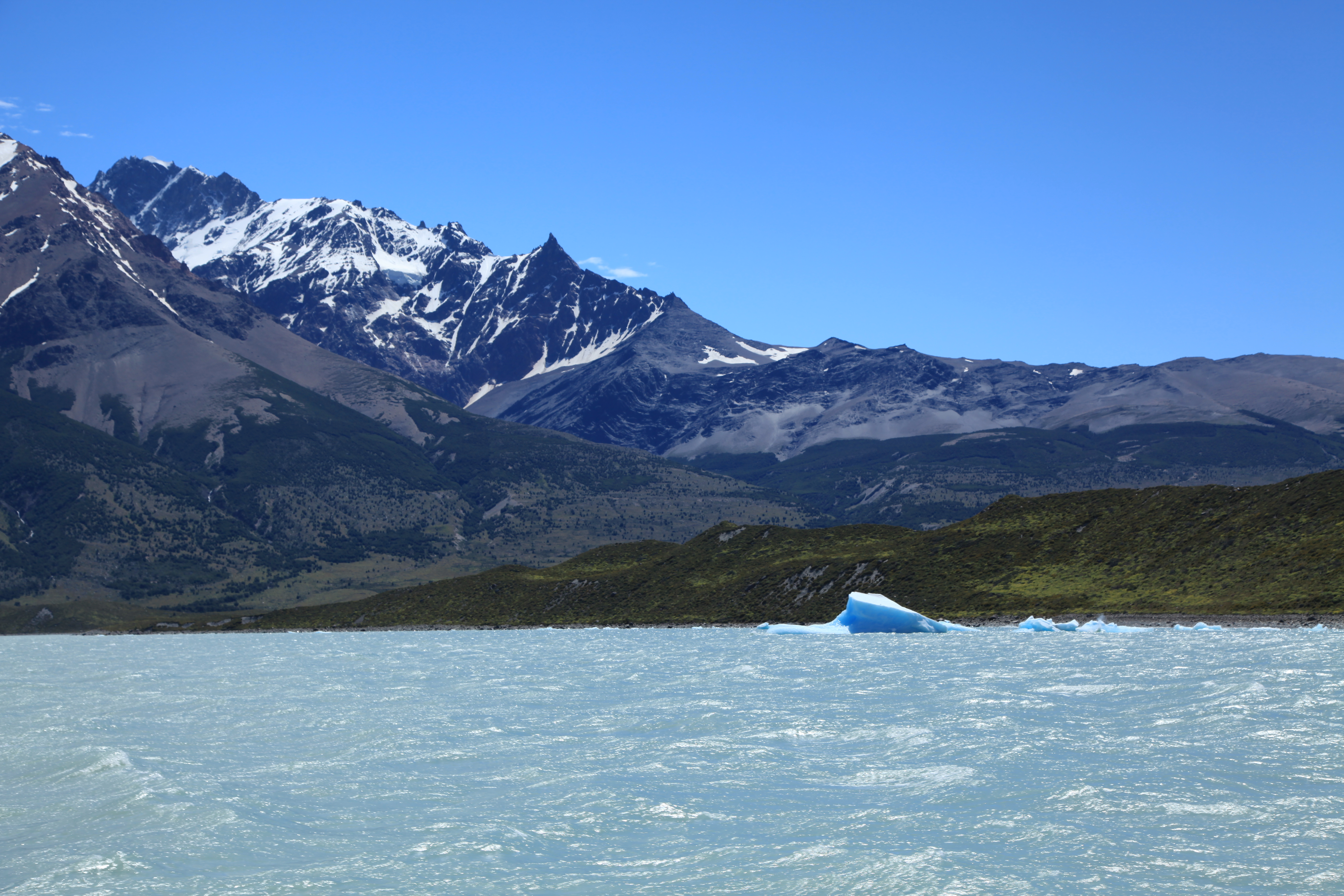
An iceberg floating in Lake Viedma.

The name of the lake comes from the Spanish explorer Antonio de Viedma, who in 1783 became the first European to reach its shores.

The town of El Chaltén and the Andes peaks Cerro Torre and Fitz-Roy lie in the proximity of the lake.

Lake Viedma is fed primarily by the Viedma Glacier at its western end. The Viedma Glacier measures 3 miles (5 kilometers) wide at its terminus at Lake Viedma. The brown landscape is a result of ice scouring, which left virtually no vegetation on the steep-walled valleys.

Water from Lake Viedma flows into Lake Argentino through the La Leona River, and eventually from there into the Atlantic Ocean through the Santa Cruz River.

Although the lake lies in Argentine territory, the western shores of the lake reach the Southern Patagonian Ice Field in an area where the border remains undefined.

A group of researchers developed an expedition to Los Glaciares National Park, in Santa Cruz Province, it was verified that the body of water reaches 900 meters deep in some sectors through which they found that Lake Viedma is the deepest in the Americas and the fifth in the world.

== See also ==
- Lake San Martín
- Lake Argentino
