= Steph Davis =

American rock climber (born 1973)

Stephanie Davis
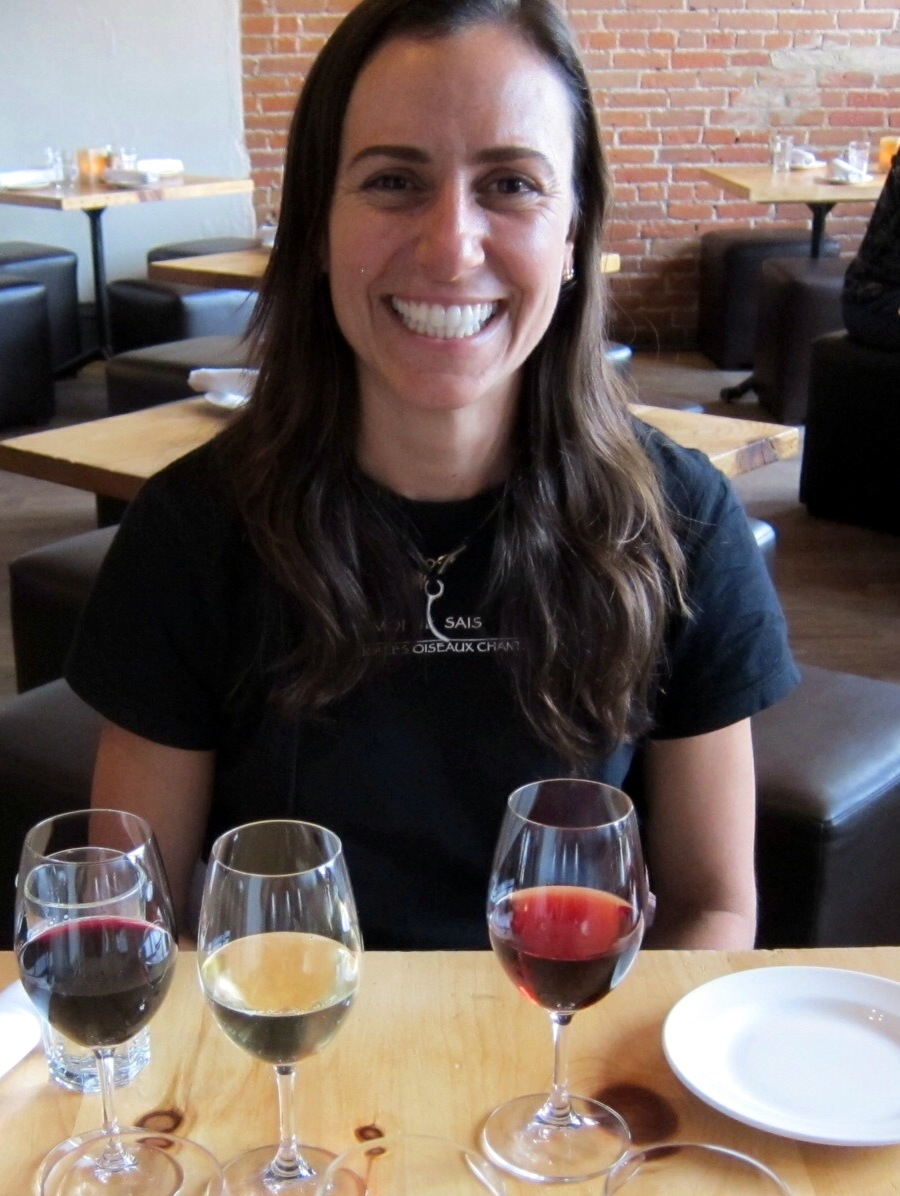
- Davis in 2010

Personal information
- Born: November 4, 1973 (age 52) Illinois, U.S.
- Education: B.A. University of Maryland; M.A. Colorado State University
- Occupation: Rock climber
- Height: 5 ft 5 in (165 cm)
- Weight: 120 lb (54 kg) (2006)

Climbing career
- Type of climber: Traditional climber, Free soloist, Free climber, BASE jumper
- Known for: Second woman to free climb El Capitan in one day; First woman to free climb the Salathé Wall; First female ascent of Torre Egger; First woman to free solo The Diamond on Long's Peak; First woman to summit Fitz Roy in Patagonia; First woman to summit all 7 major peaks of the Fitzroy Range

Stephanie "Steph" Davis (born November 4, 1973) is an American rock climber, BASE jumper and wingsuit flyer. She is one of the world's leading climbers, having completed some of the hardest routes in the world. She has free soloed up to 5.11a (6b+), and was the first woman to summit all the peaks of the Fitzroy Range in Patagonia, the second woman to free climb El Capitan in a day, the first woman to free climb the Salathė Wall on El Capitan, the first woman to free solo The Diamond on Longs Peak in Colorado and the first woman to summit Torre Egger. Davis was married to fellow climbers and BASE jumpers Dean Potter and Mario Richard (both of whom died wingsuiting) and currently to sky-diving instructor, flyer and jumper Ian Mitchard. Davis is also a blogger who writes about her interests in climbing, BASE jumping, yoga and veganism.

== Early life ==
Davis was born in Illinois and grew up in New Jersey and Columbia, Maryland. Her father, Virgil, was an aeronautical engineer and her mother, Connie, a school teacher. Davis describes herself as an unathletic child, a straight-A student and very musical. She grew up playing the piano from the age of three using the Suzuki method. By the time she was 18, she practiced six hours a day; she also played the flute and sang. In the documentary A Perfect Circle, Davis said that she learned "discipline" and "how to project things" from her 15 years of playing the piano. Her own self-description has been mirrored by others. In one Outside profile, for example, her "greatest assets" are described as "sheer will and a brainy, methodical work ethic" rather than "natural athletic talent and flawless technique".

In 1990, she attended the University of Maryland, becoming an English major. In the spring of 1991, a fellow student offered to take her climbing and she fell in love with it. She describes herself as "lit up" after climbing for the first time. She did not have this same love for piano so she quit. Ever since then, she has "had a hard time wanting to do anything else". She says that "climbing was challenging for me from day one and I think that's why I got so sucked in." In her breaks from school, Davis climbed on Longs Peak and bouldered in Hueco Tanks.

She moved to Colorado, where she was an exchange student at Colorado State University (CSU) for a year, and continued to pursue climbing there. She graduated with a bachelor's degree from the University of Maryland then moved to Colorado and attended CSU to get a master's degree in English. Her thesis focused on the canon of mountaineering literature and "the ways in which reality can be so disparate and shifting for each individual who is living through extreme circumstances" as Davis describes it. She considered attending doctoral programs in English but decided against it. She attended University of Colorado's law school beginning in September 1995, but quit after five days, knowing it was not the life for her. Against the will of her parents, she decided to pursue her passion for climbing. Davis' mother, Connie, said "It was a big shock. We were just a regular family so climbing wasn't something we could relate to. She did it by herself with no help from us."

== Climbing career ==
"Free soloing is a practice for life. What I learned is that it is all about controlling what is going on in the brain. ... There's a euphoria to finishing a long free solo. That's the only way I can describe it. I've never felt that with anything else I've done. But I always feel it after free soloing."
—Steph Davis

For the seven years after she graduated from college, Davis lived out of her car, which at first was her grandmother's Oldsmobile Cutlass Ciera; she even built a bed in the backseat. She drove around to climbing areas, guiding and waiting tables to make ends meet, earning only about US$6,000 a year. She read throughout her journeys, from novels by Gabriel García Márquez to an autobiography by Kirstie Alley, to French short stories in the original language. Some of her favorite authors are T.C. Boyle, Victor Villasenor, and Rumi. Among her climbing heroes is Layton Kor. Her parents continued to disapprove of her lifestyle, however, and she felt very alone: "My parents did not like my choices and thought I was doing stupid things with my life, and they told me so. I didn't feel like anyone cared if I did a climb I was proud of. They were just like, 'Great. What about your future schooling?'" As Davis became more well-known and successful at climbing, however, she was able to make a better living, particularly from sponsorships from major companies such as Patagonia, Five Ten, Clif Bar, and Black Diamond.

In 1998, Patagonia hired Davis as its first female "climbing ambassador". In exchange for money and free gear, she promoted their products. For Davis, it was the "validation she craved"; "it was like they were playing the role my parents never did. Their support of my passion—even more than the financial support—means everything to me." However, being a paid promoter meant that Davis had to adjust her ideas of climbing. "To be a professional climber, you have to sell yourself and convince everybody you're the best. But I don't think there is a 'best'".

=== Freerider ===
In 2004, Davis started working on Freerider (5.12d), a 38-pitch climb on El Capitan. Her aim was to free climb the route. In order to be able to achieve this in one climb, she had to know the route through and through, so she practiced it extensively. Two to three times a week, she would hike 10 miles to the summit, rope solo 1,000 feet (300 m) to the lower parts of the route and climb up alone. Potter belayed her, during her actual attempt in April 2004. After a grueling four-day climb, she became the first woman to free climb the route. In May, with the assistance of Heinz Zak, she became the second woman, after Lynn Hill, to execute a one-day free climb of El Capitan.

=== Salathé Wall ===
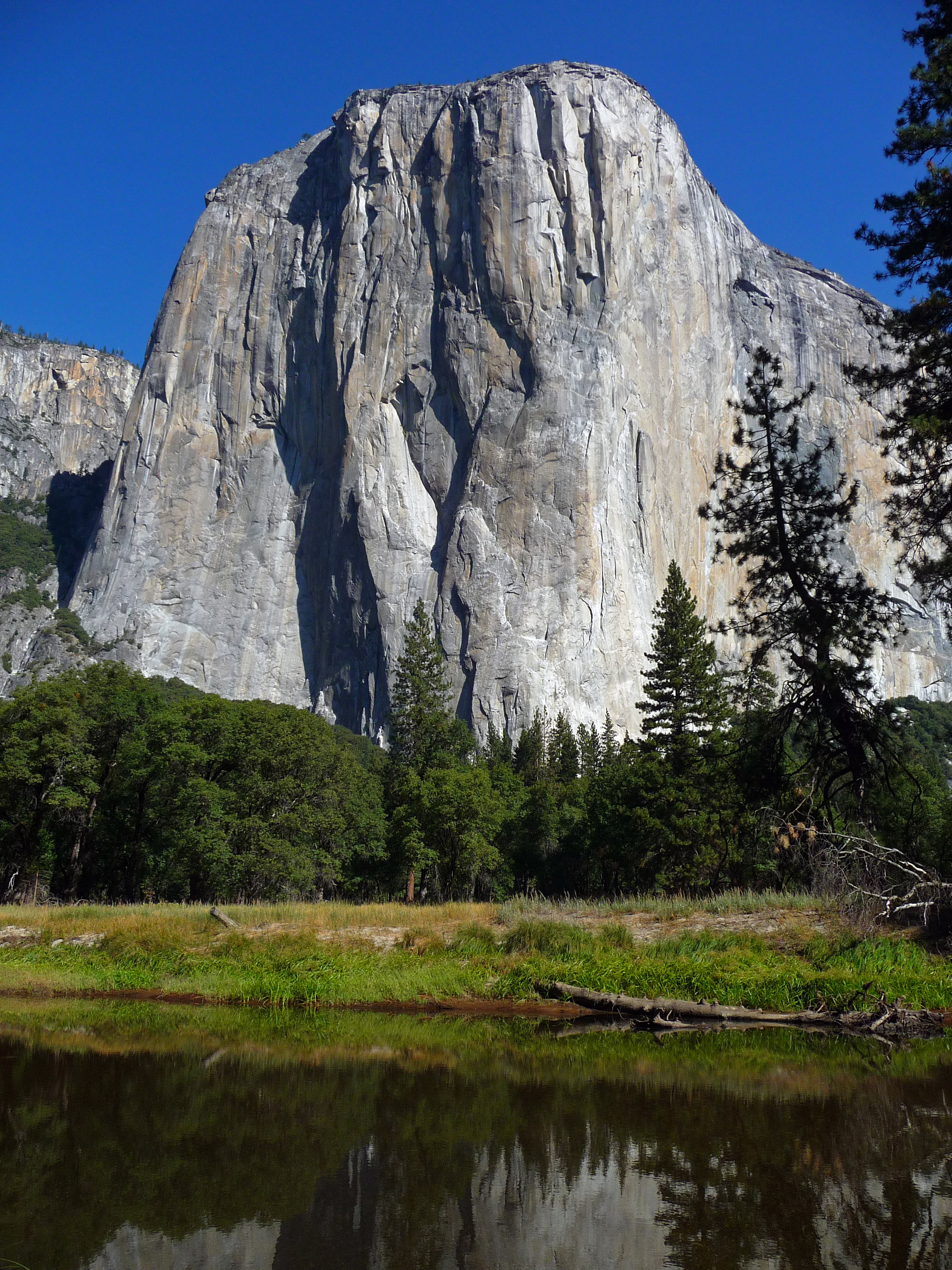
Davis free climbed the Salathé Wall route (at left) on El Capitan in Yosemite, which stretches 3,200 feet (980 m).

In 2004, Davis became the second woman to free climb El Capitan in one day. One year later, in October 2005, she became the first woman to free climb the Salathé Wall, on El Capitan, The route is rated 5.13b/c, is 35 pitches, and approximately 3,200 feet (980 m) long. The difficulty of the climb can be described as "spidering up the side of a skyscraper, climbing to [handholds] no bigger than lentils". What makes Davis' achievement even more impressive is that she free climbed the route, meaning that she used only her hands and feet to climb the rock; she did not hang off the rope or any other mechanical aids. Davis worked on the route throughout September, learning every inch of the climb and meeting Cybele Blood, who became her belayer. Davis had initially planned for the climb to take five days and had cached water and food along the route for that length of the time, but poor weather, high numbers of climbers on the route and difficult climbing made the climb take eleven days. In fact, Davis wore only light climbing shoes, climbing tights, long underwear, and a light wind jacket. The only other gear she had was climbing gear, a lightweight sleeping bag, a portable espresso maker, water and food. When the two ran low on food and water, Blood went looking for the cached supplies but couldn't find them, so Davis "jugged" to the top to get some water and then returned to the route to continue the free climb. This climb was Davis' "dream come true" and afterwards she said, "I don't have to prove anything to myself anymore, or to anyone else."

She is also the first woman to climb Torre Egger, a difficult summit in Patagonia, of which she made the first one-day ascent, with her then partner Dean Potter. When Davis arrived in Patagonia, Potter was already established, and they both climbed Cerro Stanhardt via what might have been a new route on the east face. They next attempted Torre Egger, but half-a-rope-length from the top had to turn back because of a melting ice mushroom that would have made it dangerous to continue. Once colder weather returned, the couple climbed Titanic on the east side of Torre Egger, a feat that took them 23 hours. As of December 2015, according to Dougald MasDonald, it was the first ascent by a woman, and may have been the peak's first one-day ascent.

The 2006 and 2007 were pivotal years for Davis in terms of her relationships and her climbing. In 2006, Davis' marriage to Potter ended after he climbed Delicate Arch that year. The controversial climb resulted in a public outcry, and there was a lot of criticism directed at him for climbing "such a revered landmark". The couple lost much of their financial stability because they lost a lot of sponsorships. This financial stress added to their already tension-filled relationships and led to their divorce. As a result, Davis drove from Yosemite to Colorado; she could not face going home to Moab.

=== Free soloing ===
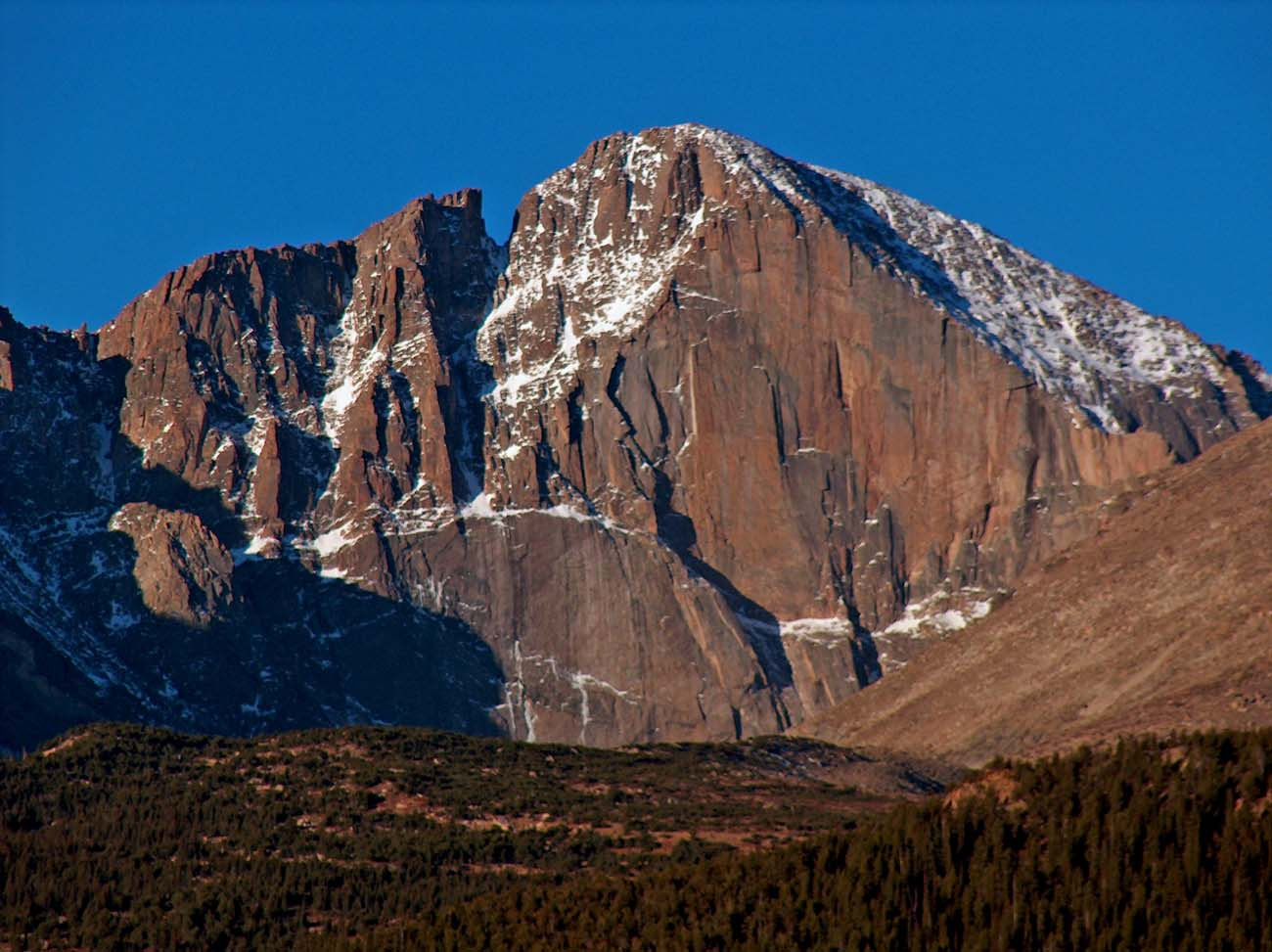
The Diamond on Longs Peak is the most famous alpine rock climbing area in Colorado.

Davis has made free solo climbing a specialty and is "one of the world's most experienced" free solo climbers. In free solo climbing, climbers rely only on themselves to ascend the rock and use no protective gear; they use no ropes, harnesses or anything else. Davis has said that she is not into free soloing for the "death-defying buzz" but rather for the sense of "control".

The Diamond on Longs Peak in Colorado is the first place Davis went alpine-climbing. It is "the most famous alpine rock climbing destination in Colorado". It is vertical to overhung granite full of cracks and at the top is 4,346 metres (14,259 ft). After her first experience there at the age of 24, she returned frequently in the summers. She began her free solo experience of the area by soloing Kiener's Route (5.3) July 7, 2007, working up to harder routes. Next, on July 14, she free soloed Casual Route (5.10) and returned again on August 27, after soloing a route on another mountain, to see if she would feel more at ease.

In September 2007, Davis free-soloed Pervertical Sanctuary (5.11a), which was her goal, a difficult route on the east face of Longs Peak (14,255 feet [4,345 m]), a thousand-foot granite wall known as "The Diamond" in Rocky Mountain National Park in Colorado. She repeated the feat on September 13 with Peter Mortimer filming. Famous among climbers, Ryan Minton explains in his article about Davis' achievement that "The Diamond is one of the most revered alpine walls in North America" and all of the climbing routes on it are extremely difficult. To be fully prepared and be sure she was not bothered by other climbers, Davis slept close to the peak itself on 3 September and began climbing at 4:15am. Interviewed after the climb, Davis said that positive thinking was central to her success, as well as knowing that she was carrying very little gear and the conception of herself as a crack climber. Davis is the first woman to free solo the Diamond and the second person to free solo the Pervertical Sanctuary route (the other is Derek Hersey).

In May 2008, Davis free soloed the North Face (5.11b) of the Castleton Tower, at the 5.11 grade. It is a famous formation in Castle Valley, Utah. After Davis climbed it, she BASE jumped from the top. In describing this climb, she referred to her climb and jump as "the cleanest possible style". Davis prepared by climbing the route multiple times in April and waiting for the perfect weather conditions. BASE jumping requires specific conditions, especially around Moab, where the cliffs are so short. On 4 May, the weather and Davis' mental state coincided, and she was ready to free solo the route. Although she woke up with a cold, for her the mental state was more important than the physical. However, while climbing she accidentally stepped on the cuff of her pants, which she unusually had unrolled due to cool temperatures and slipped; because she had such good hand and arm placement, however, she did not fall. The climb was filmed by a close friend, Jim Hurst. Davis has said in an interview that while she had always refused to have her free solos filmed in the past because she has known him so long and because he knows how she climbs, having him film was not an imposition. There was no communication between them during the filming.

Davis has made first ascents around Moab, including the Tombstone. In 2008, she climbed Concepcion (5.13), one of the hardest pure crack climbs in the world, making the third overall ascent and first female ascent of the route. She described it as her most technically demanding climb ever.

=== Expedition climbing ===
Davis has been on successful international expeditions to climb new routes in alpine, big wall, and solo styles, including in Pakistan, Kyrgyzstan, Baffin Island, Argentina, Italy, and Patagonia. Davis was the first American woman to summit Fitzroy in Patagonia and to summit all seven major peaks of the Fitzroy Range.

Davis was inspired to go to the Karakoram by photographs she saw of the Trango Towers and Shipton Spire. Davis began her mountain climbing career in 1998 by climbing Inshallah (VI 5.12 A1) with Kennan Harvey and Seth Shaw, which is on the southeast face of Shipton Spire in the Karakoram. As one article describes it, "the ascent is one of the few big-wall expeditions to have pushed the limits of free climbing in a hostile, high-altitude environment". Davis returned to the Karakoram in 2000, this time to the Kondus Valley, making a first ascent of Tahir Tower via All Quiet on the Eastern Front (VI 5.11 A3) with Jimmy Chin, Brady Robinson, and Dave Anderson. The tower was previously unknown. In her article about women in the Karakoram, climber Lizzy Scully points out that the 1990s saw an increase in the number of women not only climbing in the Karakoram but also writing about it, including Davis, putting her in the tradition of the first professional female mountaineer, Fanny Bullock Workman.

Davis has written in the past about the hurdles she faced being a woman in a male-dominated sport, but in 2009 she commented to an interviewer that she felt much of that discrimination had disappeared.

== Skydiving and base jumping career ==
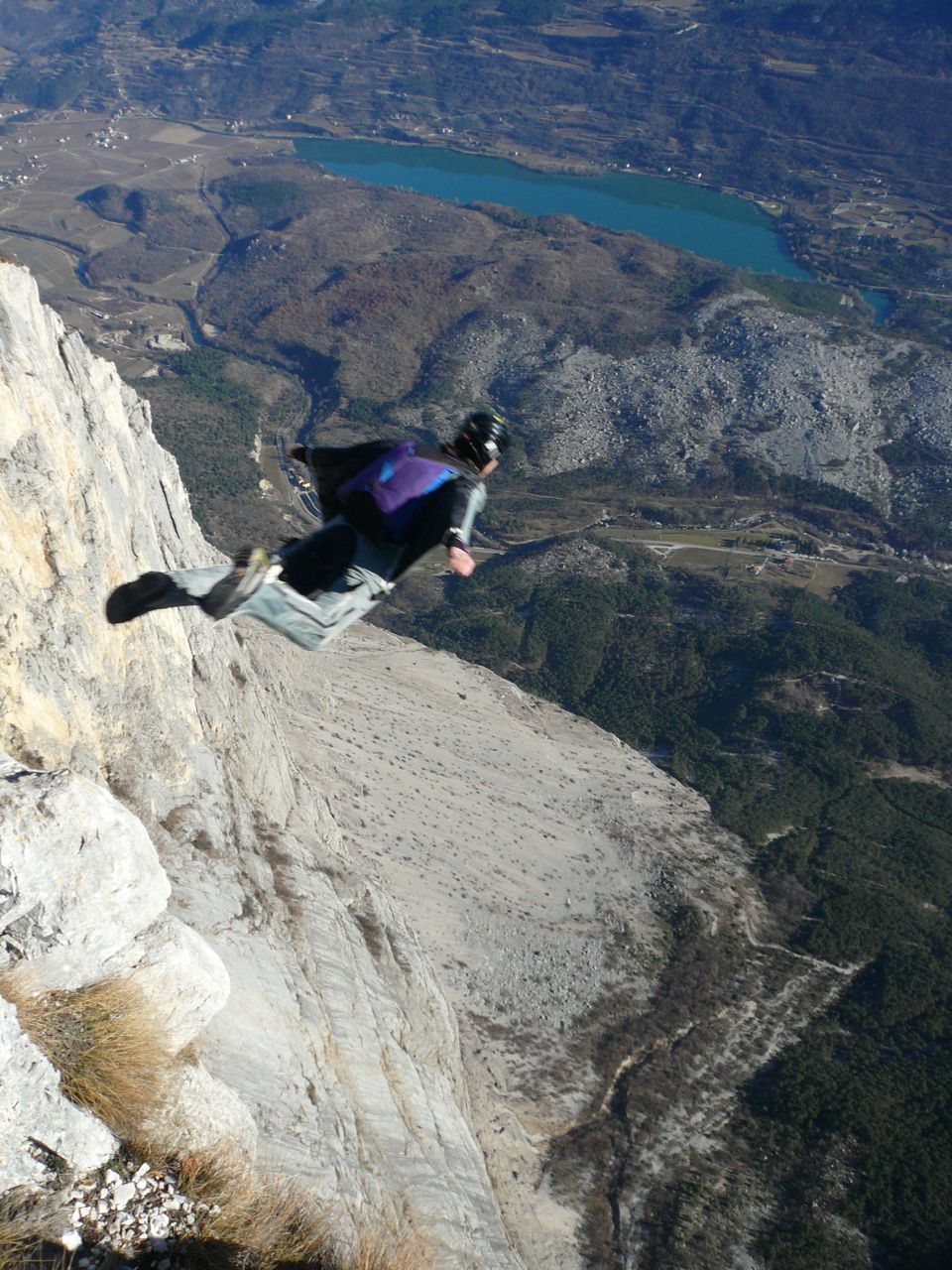
Steph Davis BASE jumping with a wingsuit.

Davis started skydiving in 2007. As she explains in A Perfect Circle, because there are not official dropzones in Moab and she became enamored of skydiving, she needed to learn to BASE jump, so she quickly became a BASE jumper so she could jump in the area around where she lived. In the winter of 2007, she sprained and crushed an ankle, sprained a knee, and required seven stitches in her thigh due to BASE jumping and other sporting activities. Ultimately it was BASE jumping that made her "comfortable with falling, feeling afraid and responding to fear with deliberate action instead of hesitation." As of January 2014, Davis reported trying to BASE jump every day or every other day, estimating that she jumps 300 times a year.

=== Moab BASE Adventures ===
In 2011, Davis and her then-husband, BASE jumper Mario Richard, started Moab BASE Adventures. It also offered guided hikes and climbs, jumps with Richard, and classes and training specifically for women. As Davis put it, "I just wanted to create an opportunity for women to take control of their own BASE career" and not be dependent on anyone.

The venture ended when Richard died wingsuiting August 18, 2013; Davis had jumped successfully just before him, but Richard hit the wall of a cliff and died.

== Media ventures ==
Davis's book High Infatuation: A Climber's Guide to Love and Gravity (ISBN 1594850658), has been translated into multiple languages. In it, according to Michael Robinson, professor of history who specializes in exploration and adventure, she "asks difficult questions about high-risk climbing, examining her own motives, personal relationships, and the broader meanings of her life's work". Davis, who loves reading and writing, has said about this book that "I've just always really loved writing and I do it all the time," describing the book as "a kind of ongoing conglomeration of what it is like to live this lifestyle".

After four years of working on the project, Davis published Learning to Fly: An Uncommon Memoir of Human Flight, Unexpected Love, and One Amazing Dog in March 2013. Written after her difficult break up with Potter, it is about how she recovered from the loss of her partner and financial stability and used her developing love of skydiving to overcome her fear of falling. Described as "gripping", it is a "story of personal growth". She had faced a lot of fear free soloing, BASE jumping and sky diving and felt that she could offer people advice about facing fear in general. As she said in an interview, "A big part of the reason I wanted to write the book is that most people have had experiences like this [fear in climbing], or will, whether it's a relationship or a career or whatever. … Life's about change. Don't be afraid."

== Notable climbs ==
=== Ascents ===
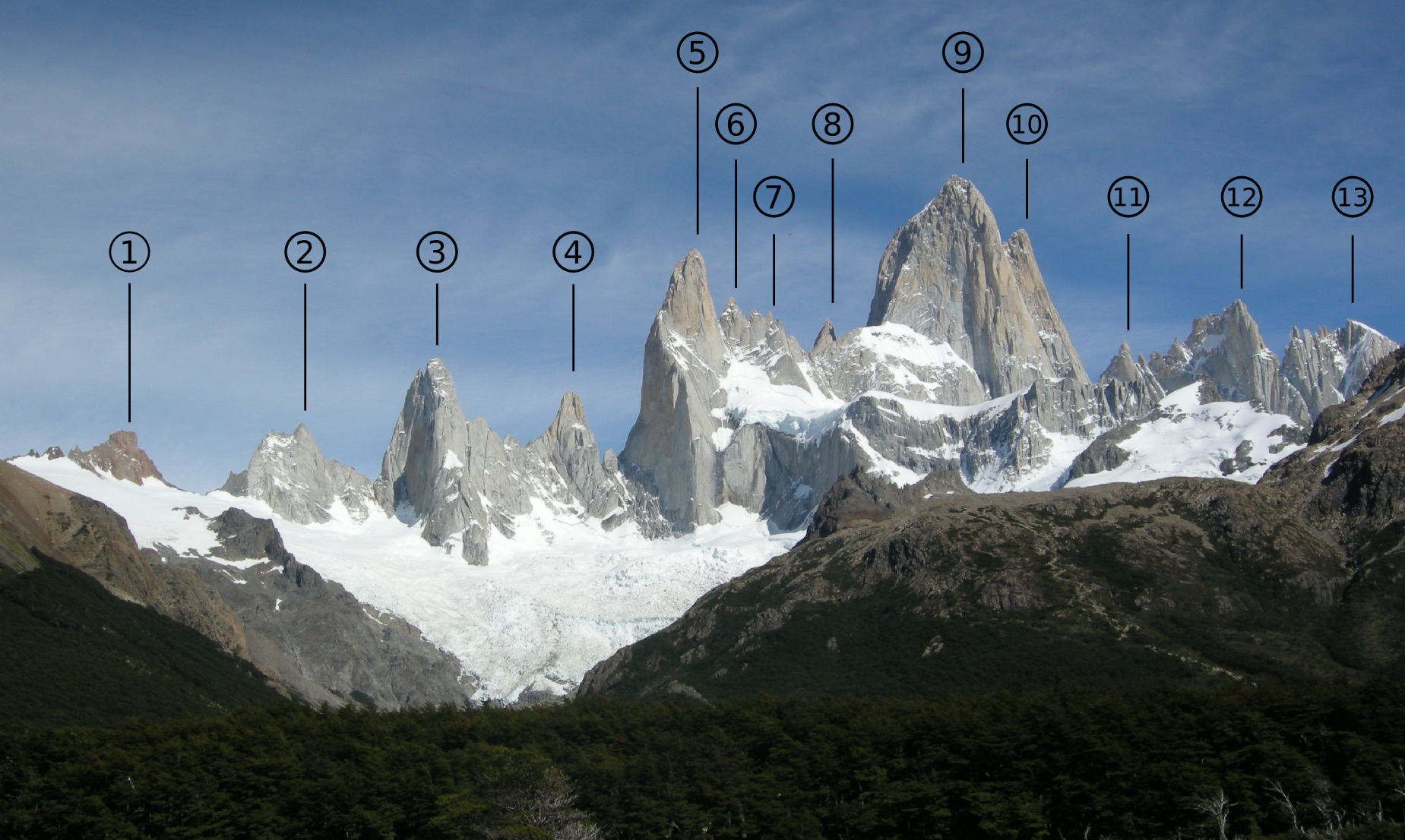
East face of the Fitz Roy group showing: (1)Cerro Mojón Rojo, (2)Aguja de la S (Aguja de l'S), (3)Aguja Saint-Exupéry, (4)Aguja Rafael Juárez, (5)Aguja Poincenot, (6)Aguja Caquito, (7)Aguja M & M, (8)Aguja de la Silla, (9)Cerro Fitz Roy (or Monte Fitz Roy, Cerro Chaltén), (10)Pilar Goretta, (11)Aguja Val Biois, (12)Aguja Mermoz, and (13)Aguja Guillaumet.

- 1996, Obelisk IV 5.11, The Diamond, Long's Peak, Colorado — First all-female ascent with Elaine Lee.
- 1996, Tricks are for Kids 5.13a/b, Indian Creek, Moab, Utah — First female ascent.
- 1997, French Route 5.12a, Peak 3850, Ak-Su Valley, Kyrgyzstan — First free ascent with Kennan Harvey.
- 1997, Big Yellow Moon V 5.12, Peak 3850, Kyrgyzstan — First free ascent with Kennan Harvey.
- 1998, Inshallah VI 5.12 A1, Shipton Spire, Pakistan — Third ascent of Shipton Spire, new route climbed all free except for a blank 10-foot section. With Kennan Harvey and Seth Shaw.
- 1999, Zen and the Art of Leadership VI 5.11 A4, Jushua Tower, Gibbs Fjord, Baffin Island — New route with Russ Mitrovich and Brandon Kannier.
- 2000, All Quiet on the Eastern Front VI 5.11 A3, Tahir Tower, Kondus Valley, Pakistan — New route and first ascent of the mountain with Jimmy Chin, Brady Robinson and Dave Anderson.
- 2000, Chouinard-Herbert V 5.11+, Sentinel, Yosemite
- 2000, Zodiac, El Capitan, Yosemite - With Beth Coats, a paraplegic who made the first female paraplegic ascent of the wall.
- 2001, The Potter-Davis Route V 5.11 C1 WI4, north face of Poincenot, Patagonia — New route.
- 2002, Red Pillar 5.10 A1, Aguja Mermoz - Ascent with Isaac Cortez. Became the first woman to ascend all seven major ridgeline summits of the Fitz Roy massif.
- 2002, The Epitaph 5.13b, Tombstone, Utah — First free ascent with Dean Potter.
- 2004, Freerider VI 5.12.d/13a, El Capitan, Yosemite — First female ascent. Third woman to free climb El Capitan. Free climbed it in April and returned in May to free climb it in a day.
- 2004, The Crackhouse, Moab, Utah — First female ascent.
- 2005, The Tombstone 5.13, Moab, Utah — First free ascent, team style with Dean Potter.
- 2005, Salathé Wall VI 5.13 b/c, El Capitan, Yosemite — First woman to free climb the Salathe Wall. 10th person overall to free climb this route.
- 2005, Titanic ED 6+/A2, 1000m, Torre Egger, Patagonia — First one-day ascent of the mountain with Dean Potter. First woman to summit mountain.
- 2008, Concepcion 5.13b/c, Moab, Utah — Third ascent of the route, first woman to redpoint it.

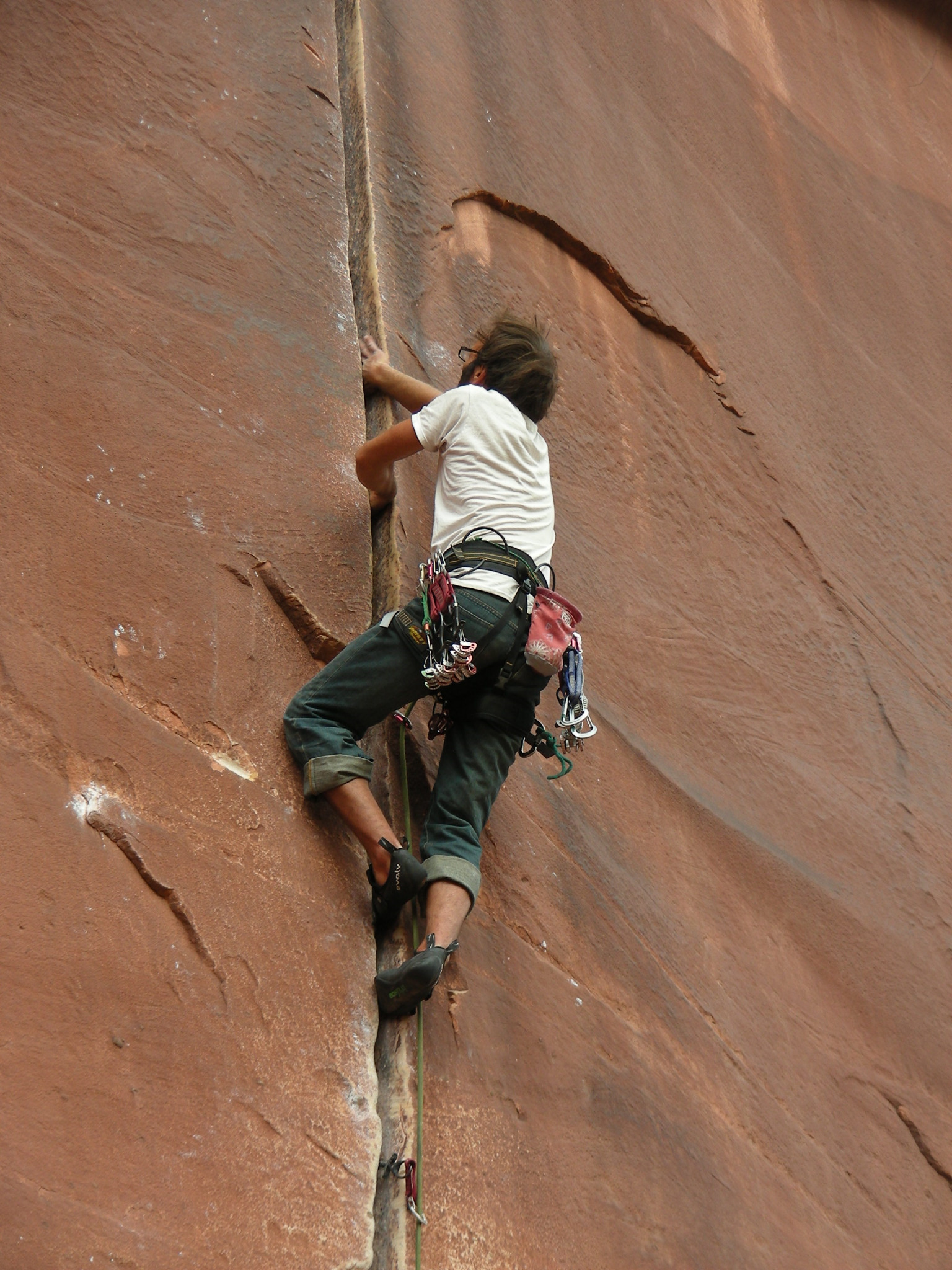
Coyne Crack at Indian Creek being led by a free climber.

=== Solo climbs ===
- 1997, A Thousand Years of Russian Christianity V 5.12, Peak 4520, Kyrgyzstan — Rope solo ascent.
- 1999, Coyne Crack 5.11+, Indian Creek, Moab, Utah — Free solo ascent.
- 1999, Scarface 5.11, Indian Creek, Moab, Utah — Free solo ascent.
- 2007, Casual Route 5.10 The Diamond, Long's Peak, Colorado — Free solo ascent.
- 2007, Pervertical Sanctuary 5.10+/5.11a The Diamond, Long's Peak, Colorado — Free solo ascent.
- 2008, North Face, Castleton Tower 5.11, Moab, Utah — Free soloed the route and descended by base jumping.

== Personal life ==
In the fall of 1994, Davis met Dean Potter while climbing Long's Peak in Colorado. He had dropped out of the University of New Hampshire in 1992 and been living out of his Volkswagen Jetta so that he could pursue climbing. The two began a tumultuous on-again/off-again relationship that involved living in each other's vehicles and trying to secure sponsorships. In 1995, Davis and Potter made Moab, Utah their home by "acquiring a storage unit and a library card." However, Davis never lived there full-time, often traveling to Yosemite, where she planned to build a house, or to other climbing destinations. In Moab, Davis turned a doublewide trailer into a small cottage, complete with a piano. After a brief split in 2001, Potter proposed, and the two married in June 2002. Despite being married, the couple were rarely in the same place at the same time due to their climbing projects. In 2006, Davis' marriage to Potter ended after he controversially climbed Delicate Arch, which caused the couple to lose sponsorships. Potter later died in a BASE jump/wingsuit accident on 16 May 2015.

In 2011, Davis married BASE jumper Mario Richard on the Parriott Mesa near Moab. After the ceremony, they leaped off the mesa and parachuted back to the ground. Richard died while wingsuiting on August 18, 2013.

In 2018, Davis married Ian Mitchard, a tandem instructor at Skydive Moab, and a wingsuit flyer and BASE jumper.

Davis also practices yoga and is a vocal vegan activist. She has also stated that she believes factory farming to be "abhorrent" and that "no one should add one more penny of their money into sustaining it."

== See also ==
- History of rock climbing
- List of first ascents (sport climbing)
- List of climbers and mountaineers
