= Aguja Guillaumet =

Mountain in Argentina

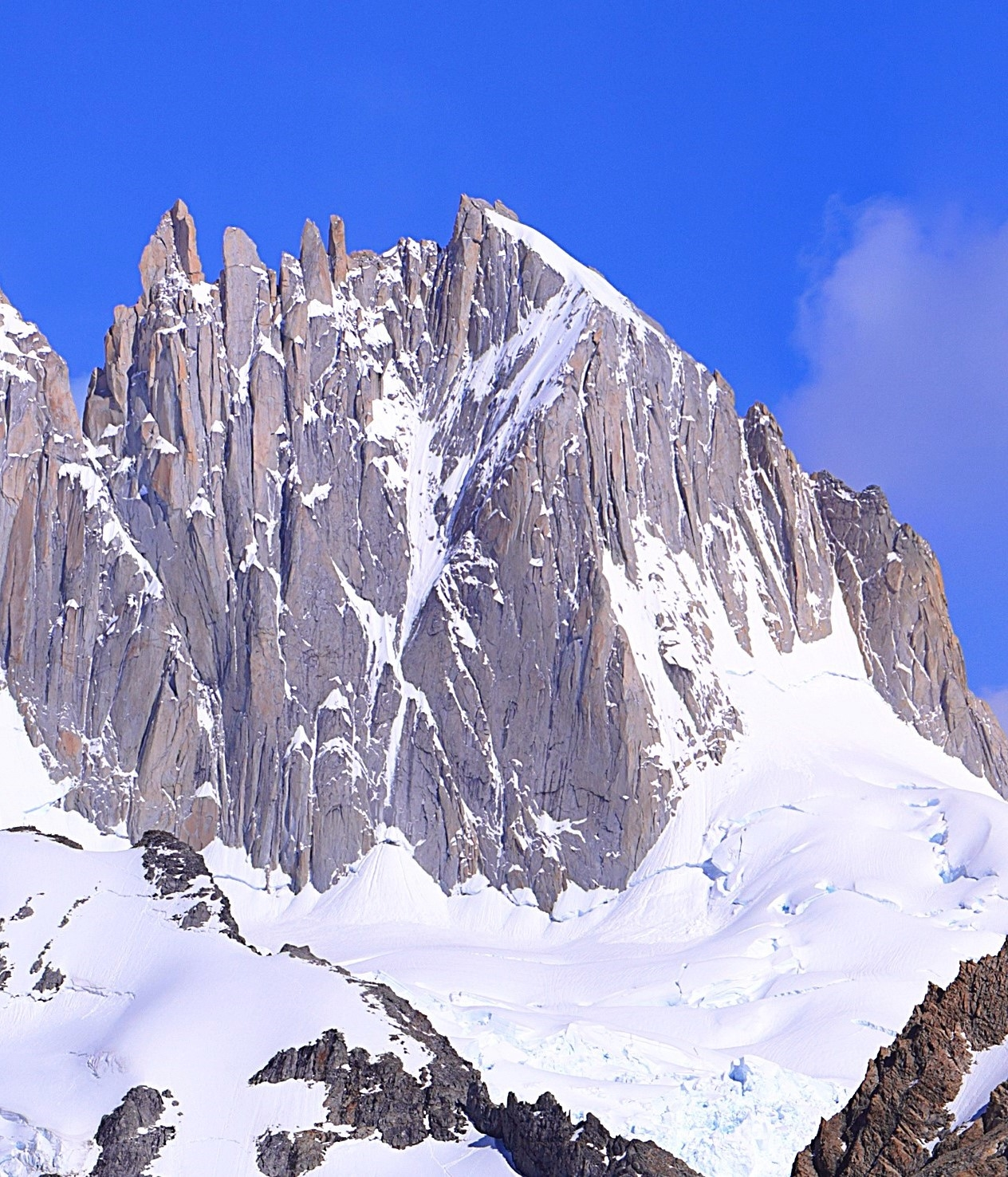
- East aspect

Highest point
- Elevation: 2,574 m (8,445 ft)
- Prominence: 123 m (404 ft)
- Parent peak: Fitz Roy
- Isolation: 0.369 km (0.229 mi)
- Coordinates: 49°15′37″S 73°02′00″W

Naming
- Etymology: Henri Guillaumet

Geography
- Location within Argentina Location within South America Location within Southern Patagonia
- Interactive map of Aguja Guillaumet
- Country: Argentina
- Province: Santa Cruz
- Protected area: Los Glaciares National Park
- Parent range: Andes
- Topo map: IGN 4769‑III El Chaltén

Geology
- Rock age: Cretaceous
- Rock type: Granite

Climbing
- First ascent: 1965

Aguja Guillaumet is a mountain in Santa Cruz Province, Argentina.

== Description ==
Aguja Guillaumet is a 2,574-meter-elevation (8,445-foot) summit in the Andes. The peak is located 1.5 kilometers (0.93 miles) northeast of Fitz Roy and 13 kilometers (8 miles) northwest of El Chaltén, in Los Glaciares National Park of Patagonia. Precipitation runoff from the mountain's slopes drains to Viedma Lake. Topographic relief is significant as the summit rises 1,925 meters (6,315 ft) above Laguna Piedras Blancas in four kilometers (2.5 miles), and 1,175 meters (3,855 ft) above the North Fitz Roy Glacier in one kilometer (0.6 mi). The first ascent of the summit was made in 1965 by Carlos Comesaña and José Luis Fonrouge. The toponym, which translates as Guillaumet Needle, was applied by Louis Lliboutry in 1952 to honor Henri Guillaumet (1902–1940), a French aviator who carried mail between Argentina and Chile. The nearest higher peak is Aguja Mermoz, 0.475 kilometer (0.3 mile) to the southwest.

== Climbing ==
Established climbing routes with first ascents:

- Original route – 1965 – class 5.10d – Carlos Comesaña, José Luis Fonrouge
- Amy-Vidailhet – 1968 – class 5.8 – Bernard Amy, Pierre Vidailhet
- Guillot-Conqueugniot – 1968 – class 5.8 – Joël Coqueugniot, François Guillot
- North Ridge – 1981 – Eduardo Brenner, Eduardo Moschioni
- Hard Sayin’ Not Knowing – 2009 – Kate Rutherford, Michael Schaefer
- Patagonian Werewolfs – 2012 – Marcos Costa, Sergey Dashkevitch

== Climate ==
According to the Köppen climate classification system, Aguja Guillaumet is located in a tundra climate zone with cold, snowy winters, and cool summers. Weather systems are forced upward by the mountains (orographic lift), causing moisture to drop in the form of rain and snow. This climate supports the Piedras Blancas Glacier below the east slope of the peak and the North Fitz Roy Glacier to the west. The months of November through March offer the most favorable weather for visiting or climbing in this area.

== Gallery ==
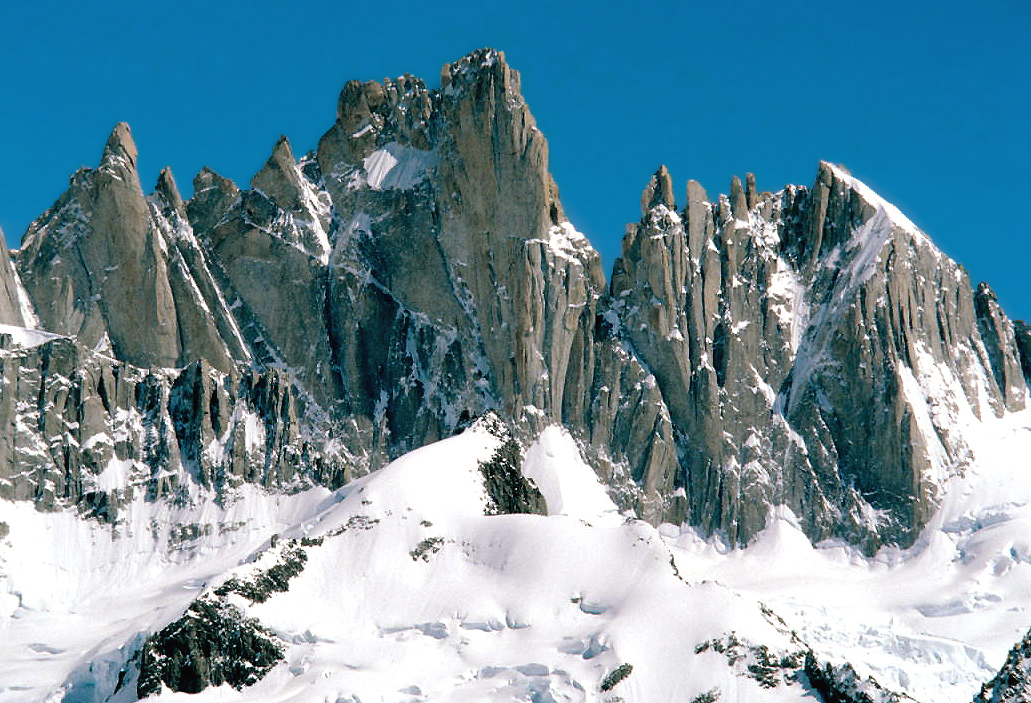
East aspect of Mermoz and Guillaumet

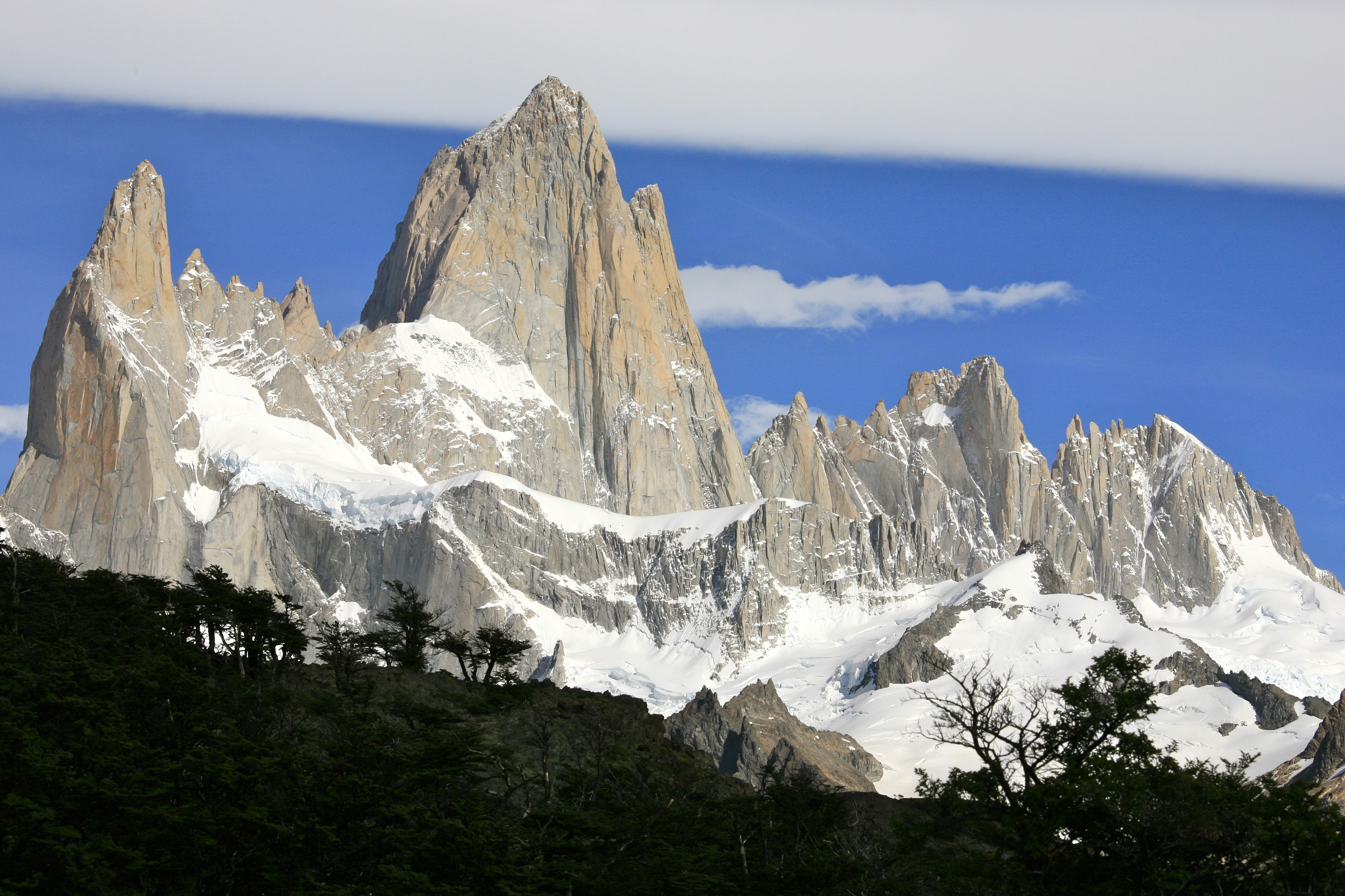
Aguja Poincenot (left), Fitz Roy, Aguja Mermoz, Aguja Guillaumet

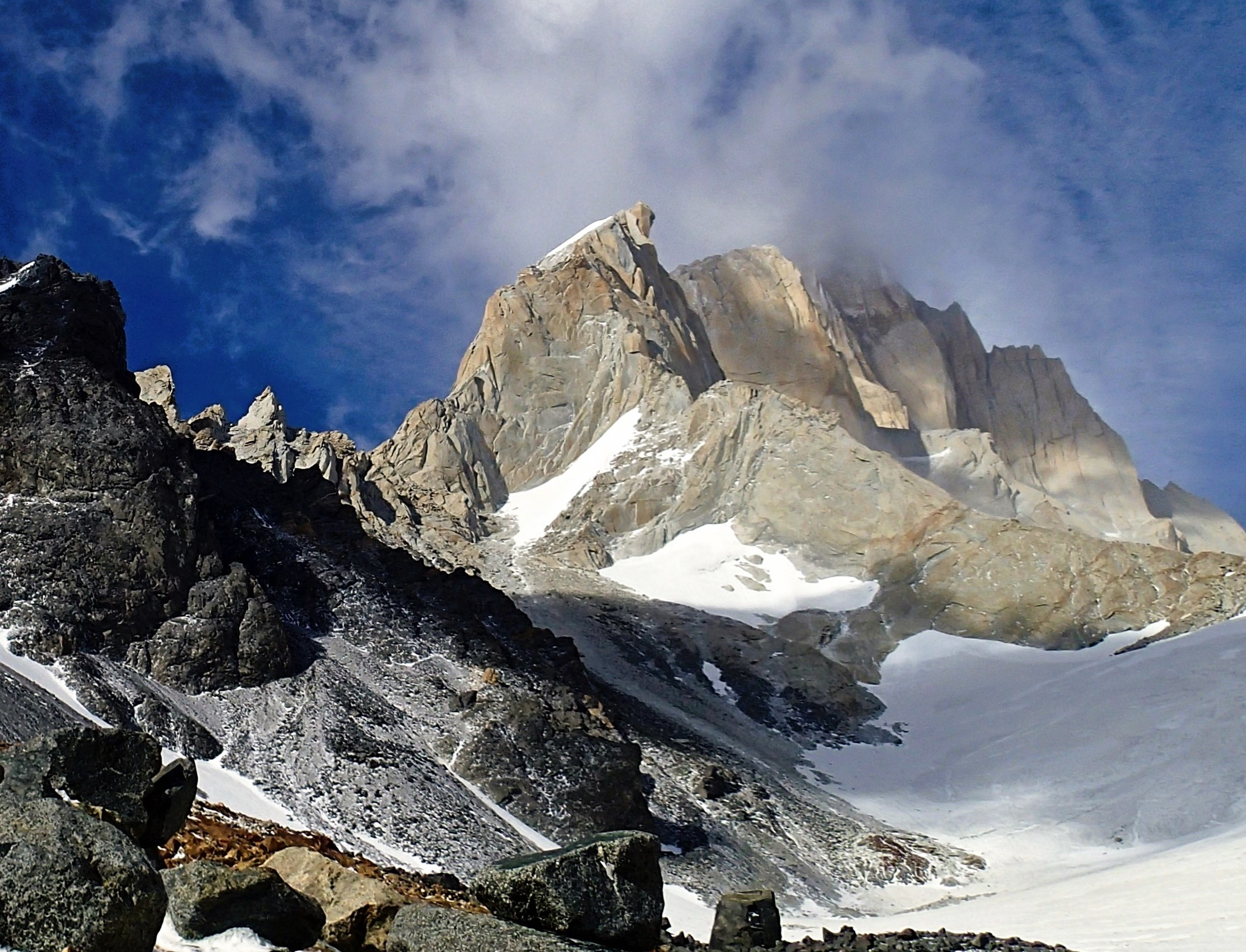
Aguja Guillaumet (center) from NNE

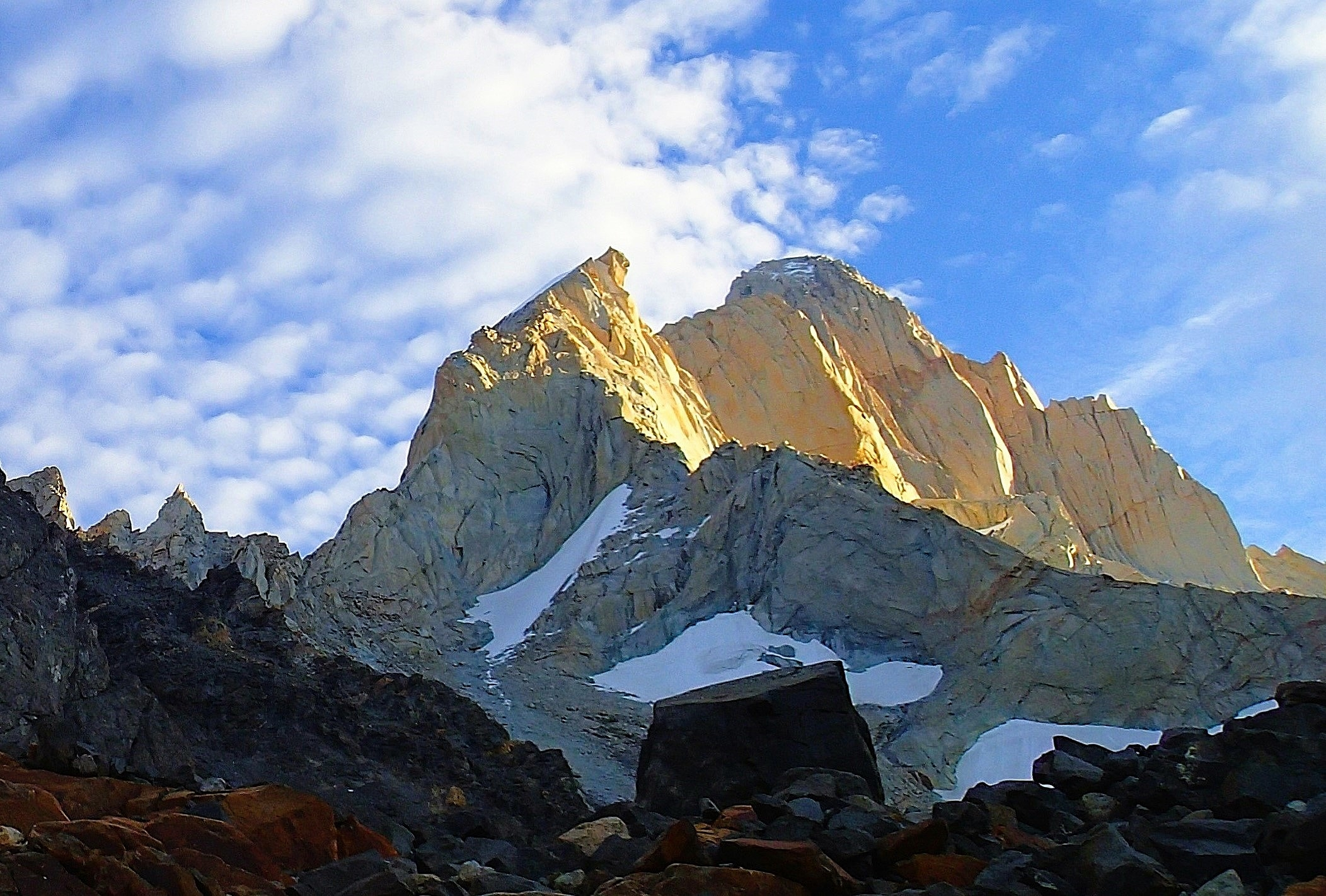
Aguja Guillaumet (left) and Aguja Mermoz (right) from NNE

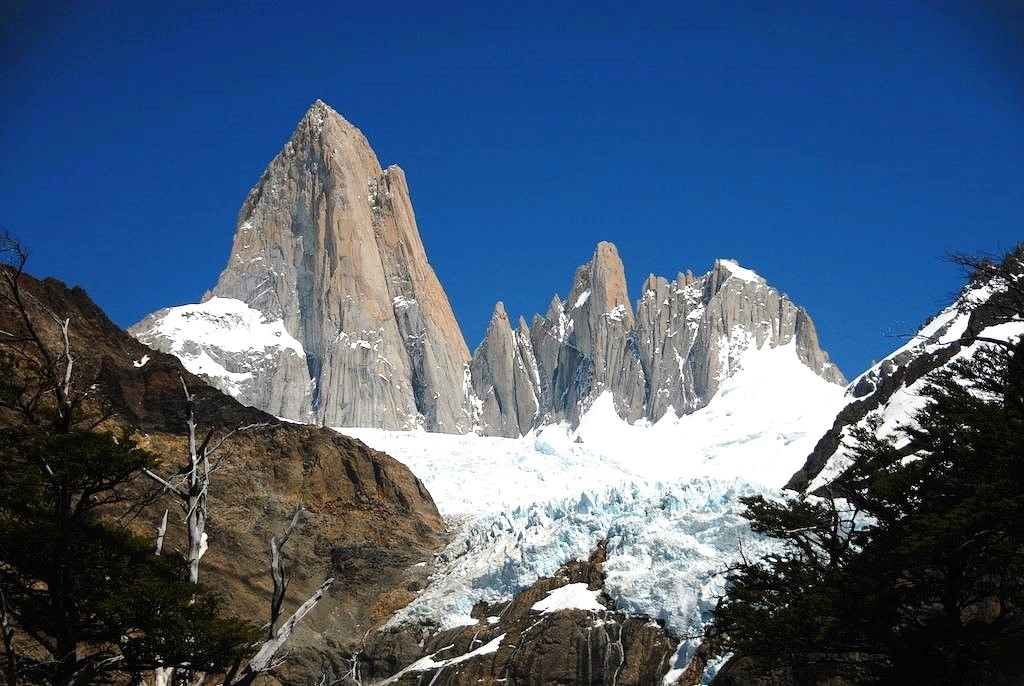
Fitz Roy (left), Aguja Mermoz and Aguja Guillaumet rise above Glaciar Piedras Blancas

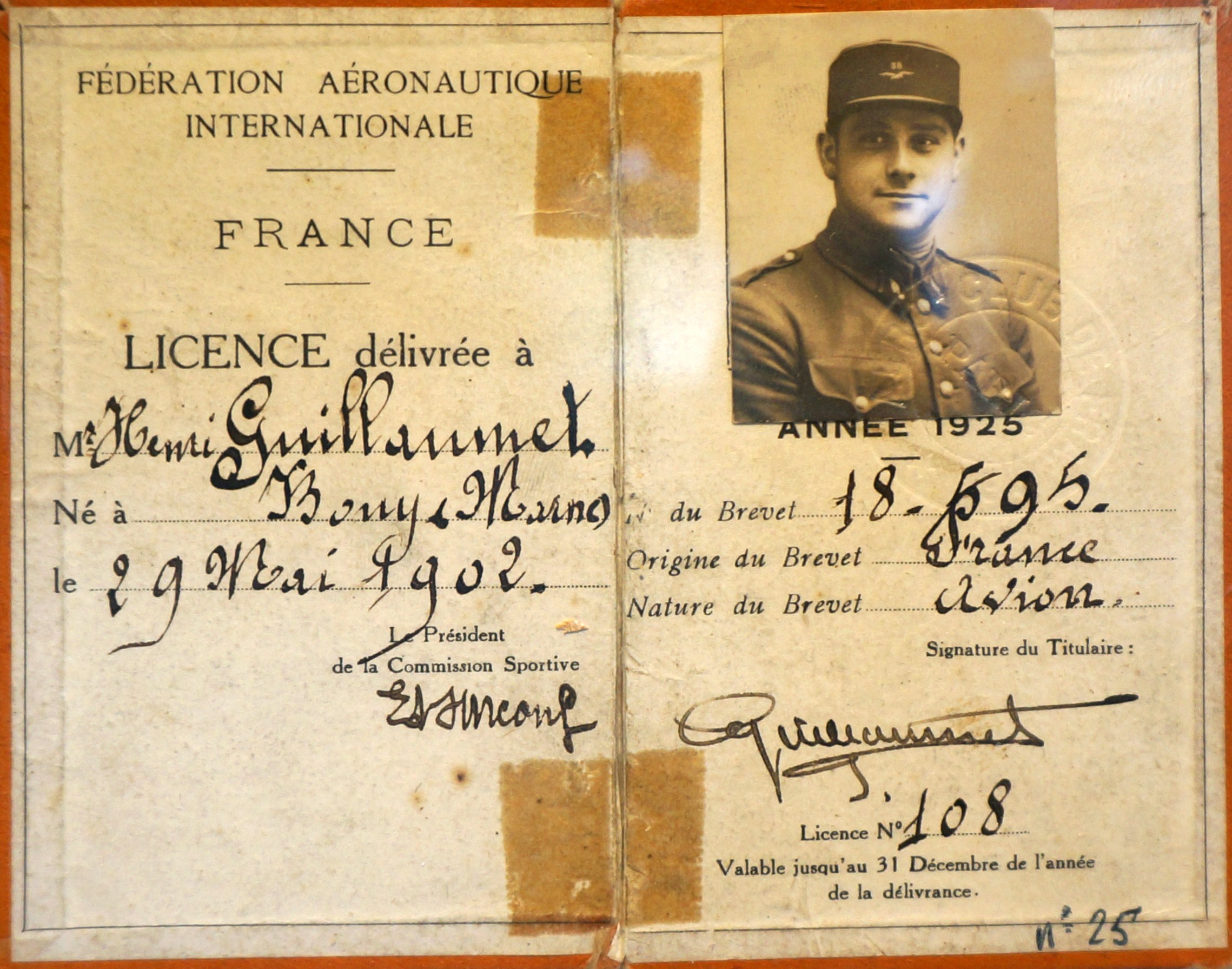
Henri Guillaumet

== See also ==
- List of mountains in Argentina
