= Chaltén =

Chaltén may refer to:

- Fitz Roy, or Cerro Chaltén, a mountain in Patagonia, South America
- El Chaltén, a village at the base of Cerro Chaltén
