= Aguja Poincenot =

Mountain in Argentina

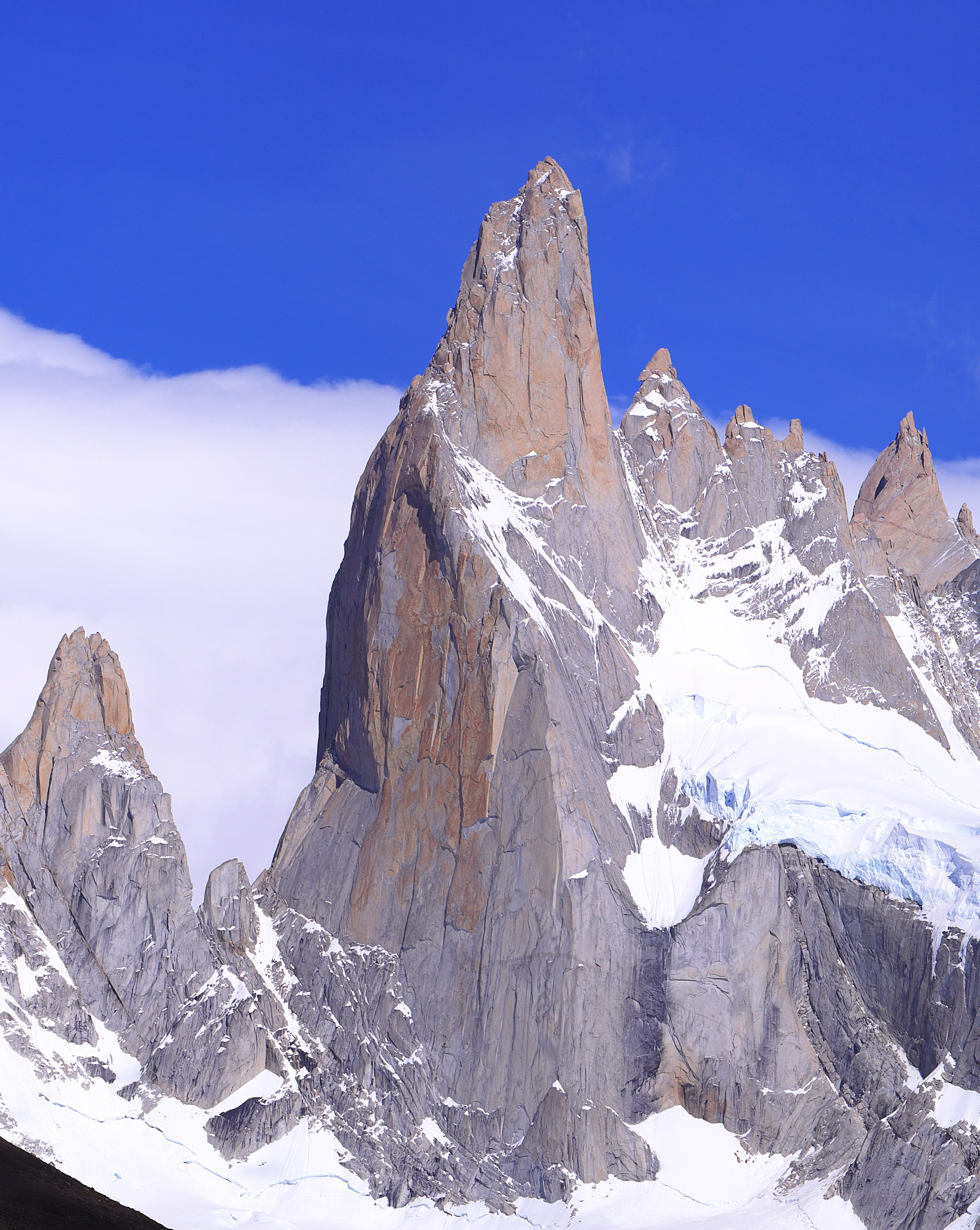
- East face

Highest point
- Elevation: 3,002 m (9,849 ft)
- Prominence: 392 m (1,286 ft)
- Parent peak: Fitz Roy
- Isolation: 1.09 km (0.68 mi)
- Coordinates: 49°16′52″S 73°02′26″W

Naming
- Etymology: Jacques Poincenot

Geography
- Location within Argentina Location within South America Location within Southern Patagonia
- Interactive map of Aguja Poincenot
- Country: Argentina
- Province: Santa Cruz
- Protected area: Los Glaciares National Park
- Parent range: Andes
- Topo map: IGN 4769‑III El Chaltén

Geology
- Rock age: Cretaceous
- Rock type: Granite

Climbing
- First ascent: 1962
- Easiest route: East Face

Aguja Poincenot is a mountain in Santa Cruz Province, Argentina.

== Description ==
Aguja Poincenot, also known as Cerro Poincenot, is a 3,002-meter-elevation (9,849-foot) summit in the Andes. The peak is located one kilometer (0.6 mile) south of Fitz Roy and 12 kilometers (7.5 miles) northwest of El Chaltén, in Los Glaciares National Park of Patagonia. Precipitation runoff from the mountain's slopes drains to Viedma Lake. Topographic relief is significant as the summit rises 2,100 meters (6,890 ft) above Laguna Sucia in two kilometers (1.2 miles), and 2,030 meters (6,660 ft) above the Torre Glacier in two kilometers. The first ascent of the summit was made on January 31, 1962, by Don Whillans and Frank Cochrane via the east face and southeast ridge. The toponym, which translates as Poincenot Needle, was applied by Louis Lliboutry in 1952 to honor French mountaineer Jacques Poincenot (1923–1951) who drowned in the Fitz Roy River while approaching Fitz Roy as a member of the first ascent expedition. The nearest higher peak is Fitz Roy, 1.06 kilometers (0.68 mile) to the north.

== Climbing history ==
Established climbing routes with first ascents:

- East face – 1962 – Don Whillans, Frank Cochrane
- Fonrouge-Rosasco (SW Face) – 1968 – José Luis Fonrouge, Alfredo Rosasco
- Carrington-Rouse (West Face) – 1977 – Rab Carrington, Alan Rouse
- 40º Gruppo Ragni (North Face) – 1986 – Paolo Vitali, Mario Panzeri, Marco Della Santa, Daniele Bosisio
- Neverending Story (SW Face) – 1987 – Fernado Cobo, Máximo Murcia
- Judgment Day (SW Face) – 1992 – Jay Smith, Steve Gerberding
- Whisky Time (East Face) – 1994 – Beat Eggler, Michal Pitelka
- Bagual Bigwall (SE Face) – 1995 – Makoto Ishibe, Alexandre Portela, Mike Schwitter, Andy Magg
- The Old Smuggler's Route (North Face) – 1996 – Jim Donini, Gregory Crouch
- Potter-Davis (North Face) – 2001 – Stephanie Davis, Dean Potter
- Southern Cross (West Face) – 2002 – Jonathan Copp, Dylan Taylor
- Bransby-Tresch (SW Face) – 2004 – Ben Bransby, Jvan Tresch
- Sperone degli Italiani (SE Face) – 2005 – Silvo Karo, Andrej Grmovšek
- The Sacrifice of the Mouse (SW Face) – 2006 – Dave Sharratt, Freddie Wilkinson
- DNV Direct (SW Face) – 2008 – Jason Kruk, Will Stanhope
- Banana Wall (North Face) – 2008 – Sacha Friedlin, Frédéric Maltais
- Fühle Dich stark, aber nicht unsterblich (East Face) – 2009 – Simon Gietl, Roger Schaeli
- Tango Viejo (West Face) – 2010 – Erich Gatt, Stephan Gatt
- Desperate Patagonians (East Face) – 2010 – Oriol Baro, Ramiro Calvo
- Benedetti-DeGregori (SW Face) – 2010 – Nicolás Benedetti, Esteban De Gregori
- Rise of the Machines (SW Face) – 2011 – Jens Holsten, Joel Kauffman, Mikey Schaefer
- Via Russo (SE Face) – 2012 – Sergey Dashkevich, Mikhail Devi, Evgeniy Dmitrienko, Arkadiy Seregi
- John Henry (North Face) – 2015 – Crystal Davis-Robbins, Jonathan Schaffer
- Invisible Line (North Face) – 2015 – Michal Brunner, Jindrich Hudecek
- The Power of Independent Trucking (North Face) – 2023 – Mateo Esposito, Ripley Boulianne
- Pot (South Face) – 2024 – Luka Lindič, Luka Krajnc

== Climate ==
According to the Köppen climate classification system, Aguja Poincenot is located in a tundra climate zone with cold, snowy winters, and cool summers. Weather systems are forced upward by the mountains (orographic lift), causing moisture to drop in the form of rain and snow. This climate supports the Piedras Blancas Glacier below the northeast slope of the peak, the Rio Blancas Glacier to the east, and the Torre Glacier to the west. The months of November through February offer the most favorable weather for visiting or climbing this peak.

== Gallery ==
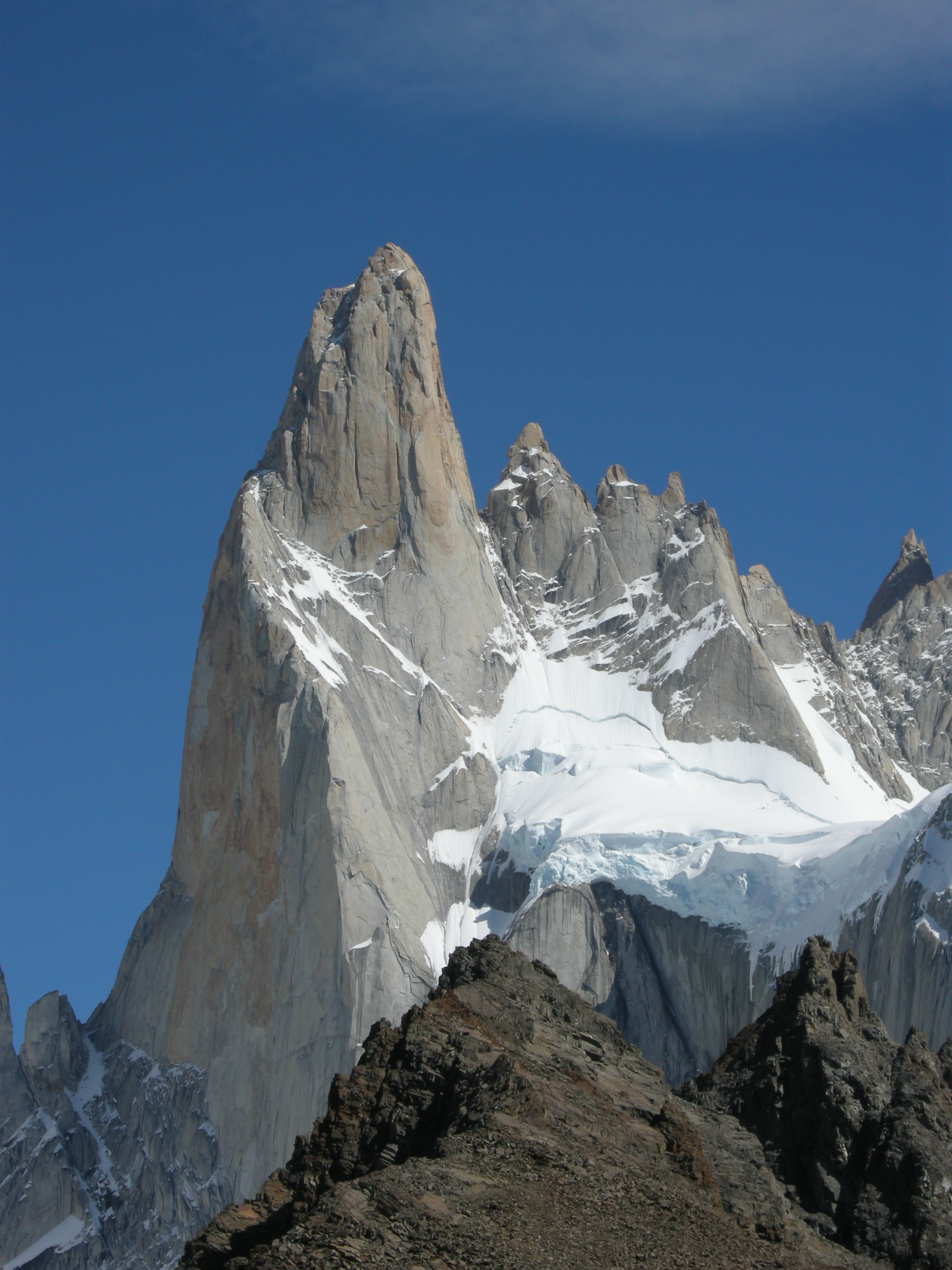
East aspect

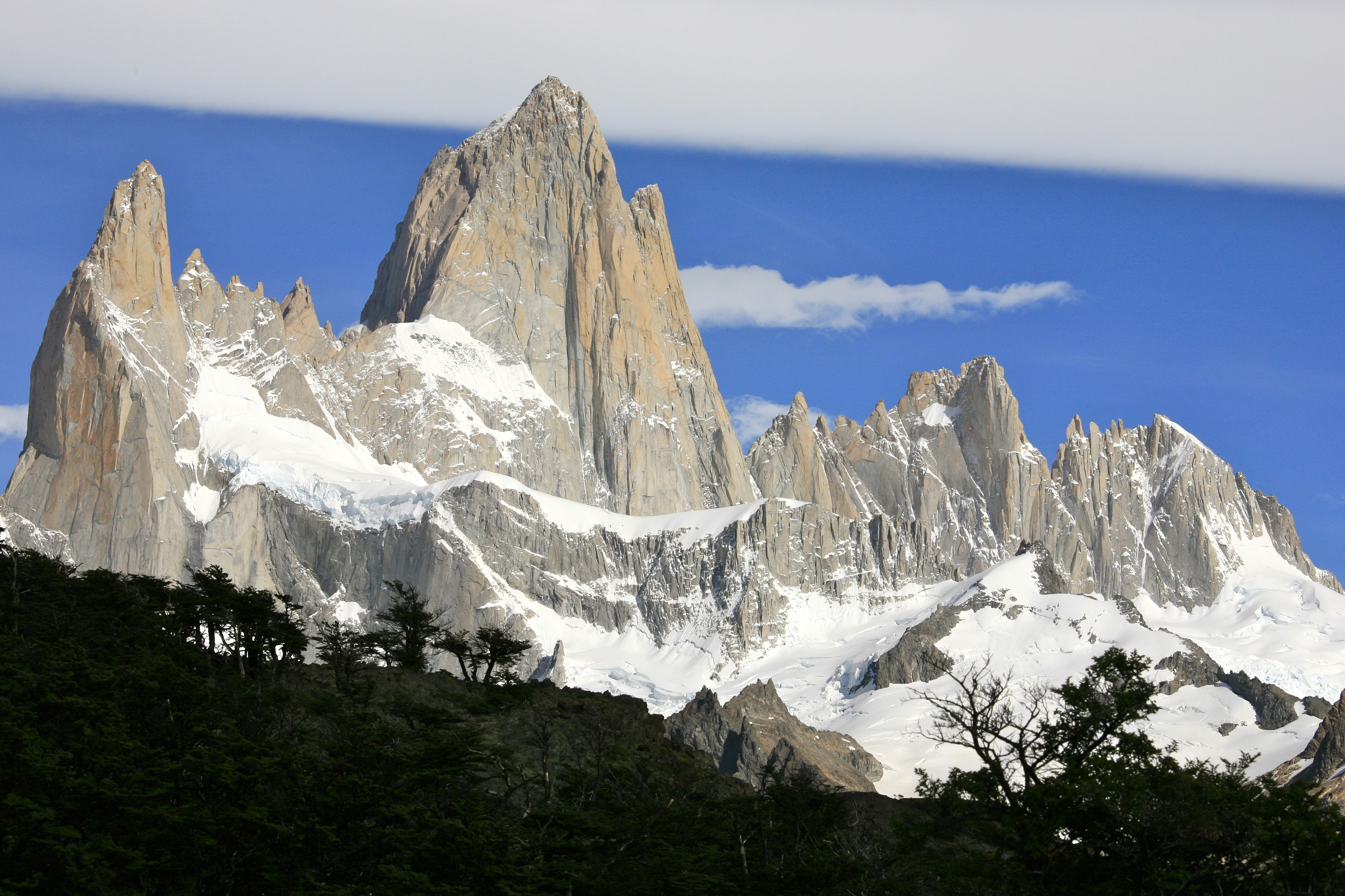
Poincenot (left), Fitz Roy, Aguja Mermoz (right)

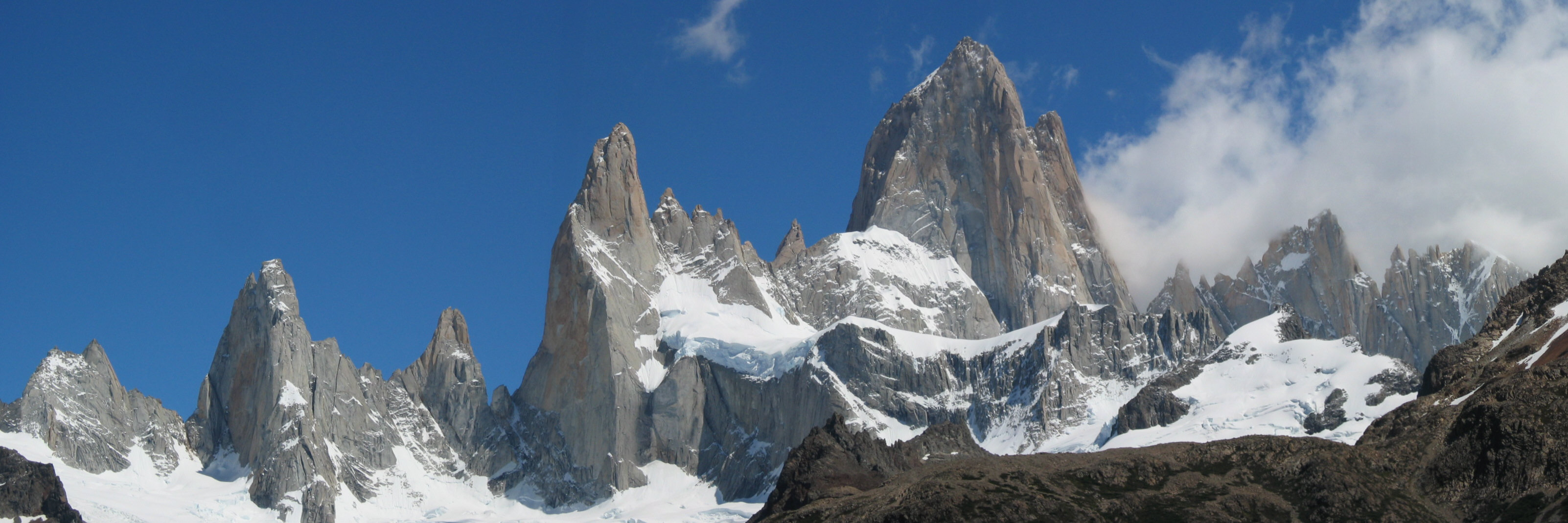
Aguja Saint Exupery, Poincenot, Fitz Roy, Aguja Mermoz

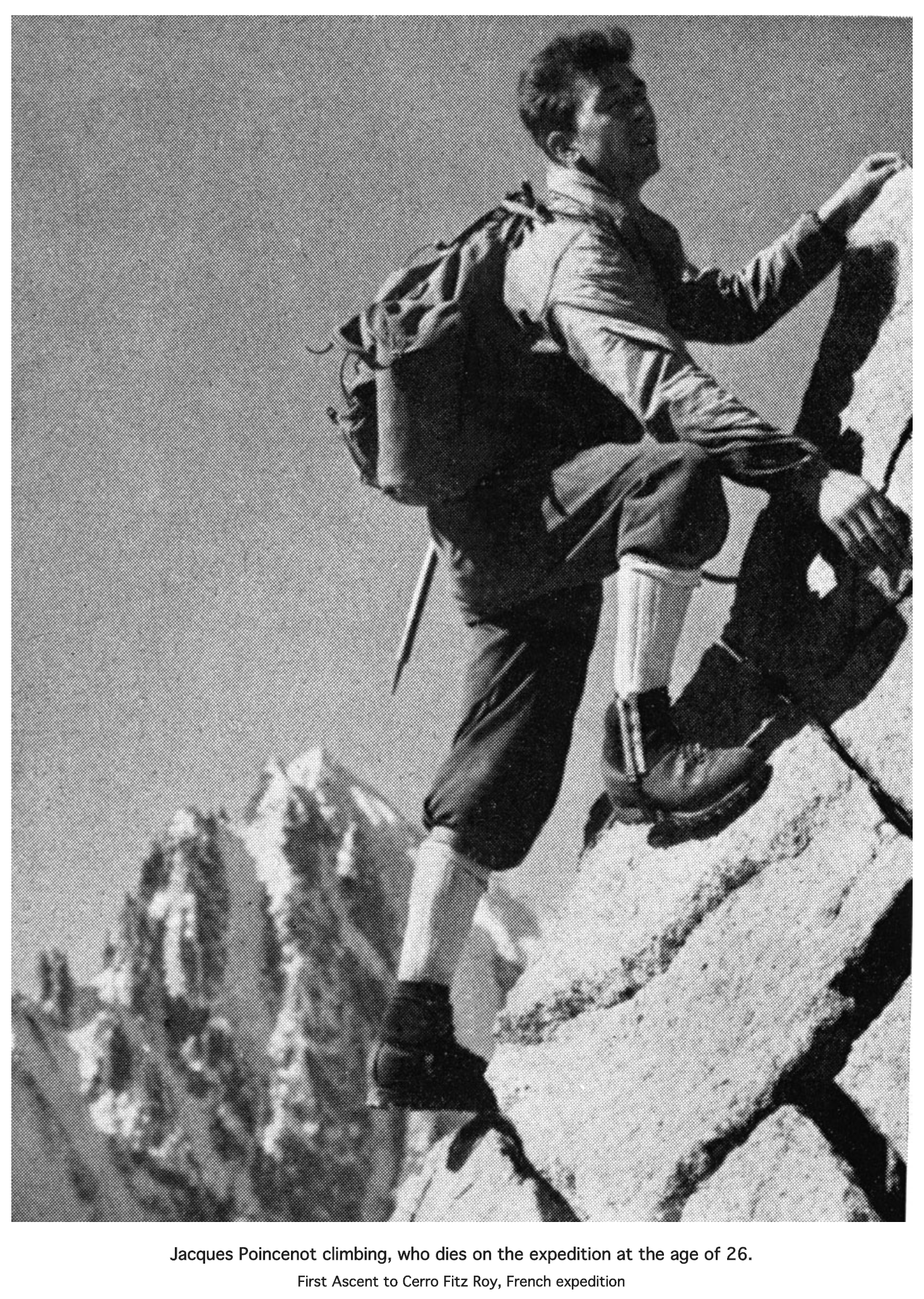
Jacques Poincenot

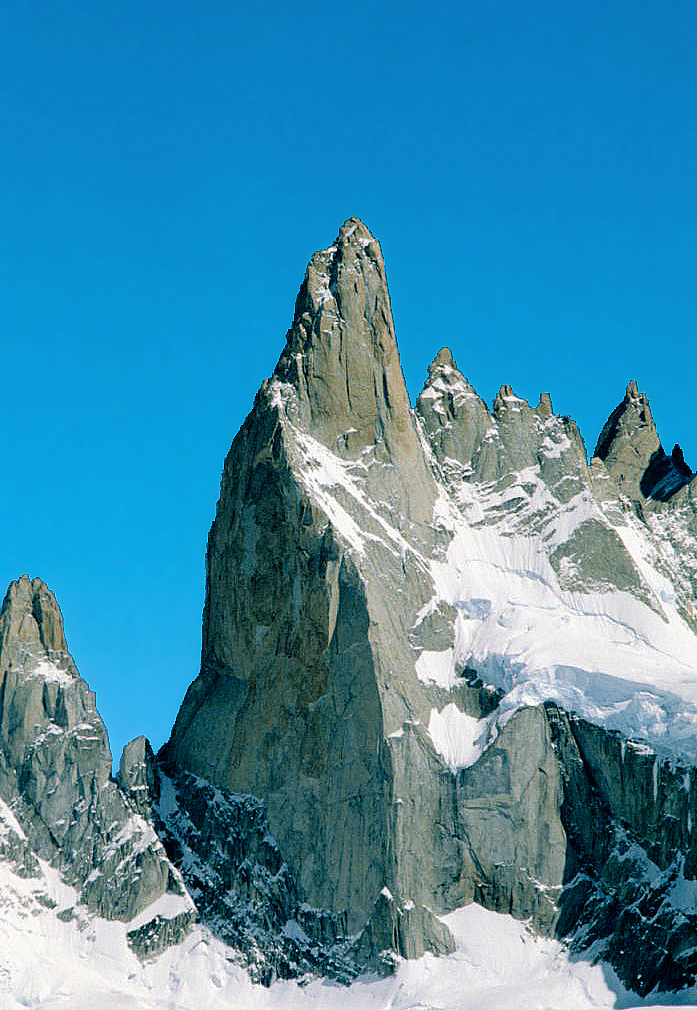
East aspect

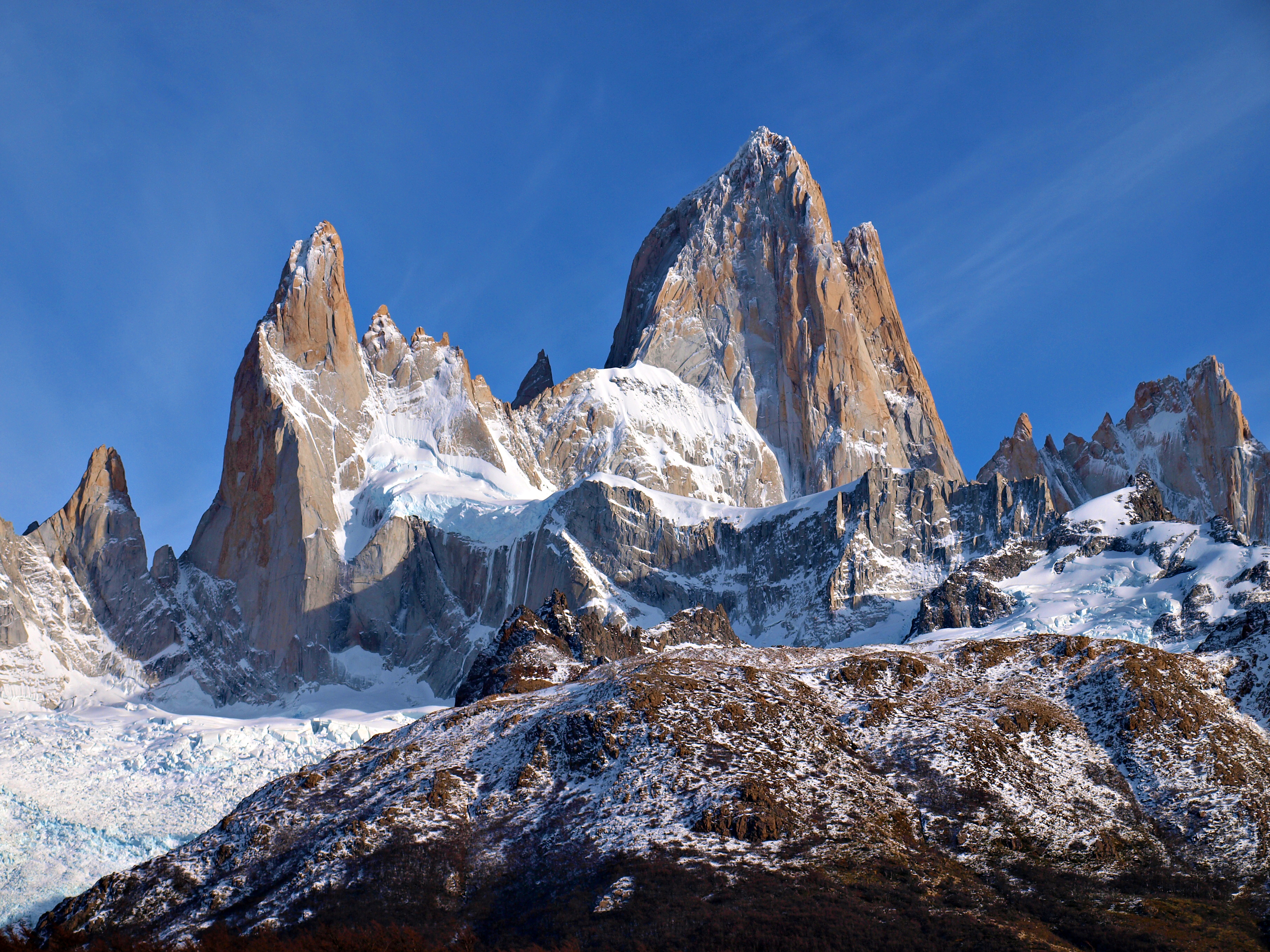
Poincenot (left), Fitz Roy (right)

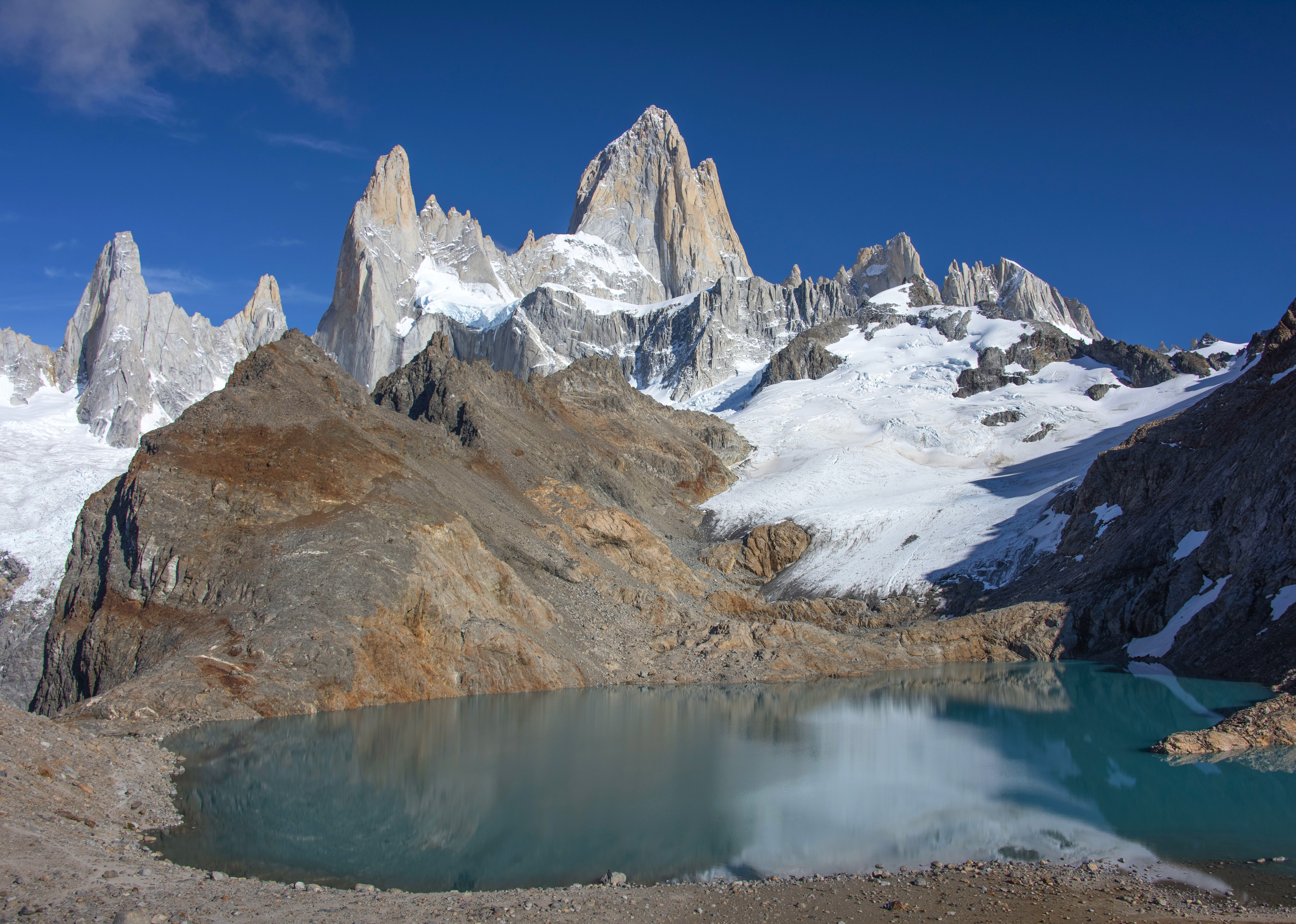
Poincenot (left of center) viewed from Laguna Sucia

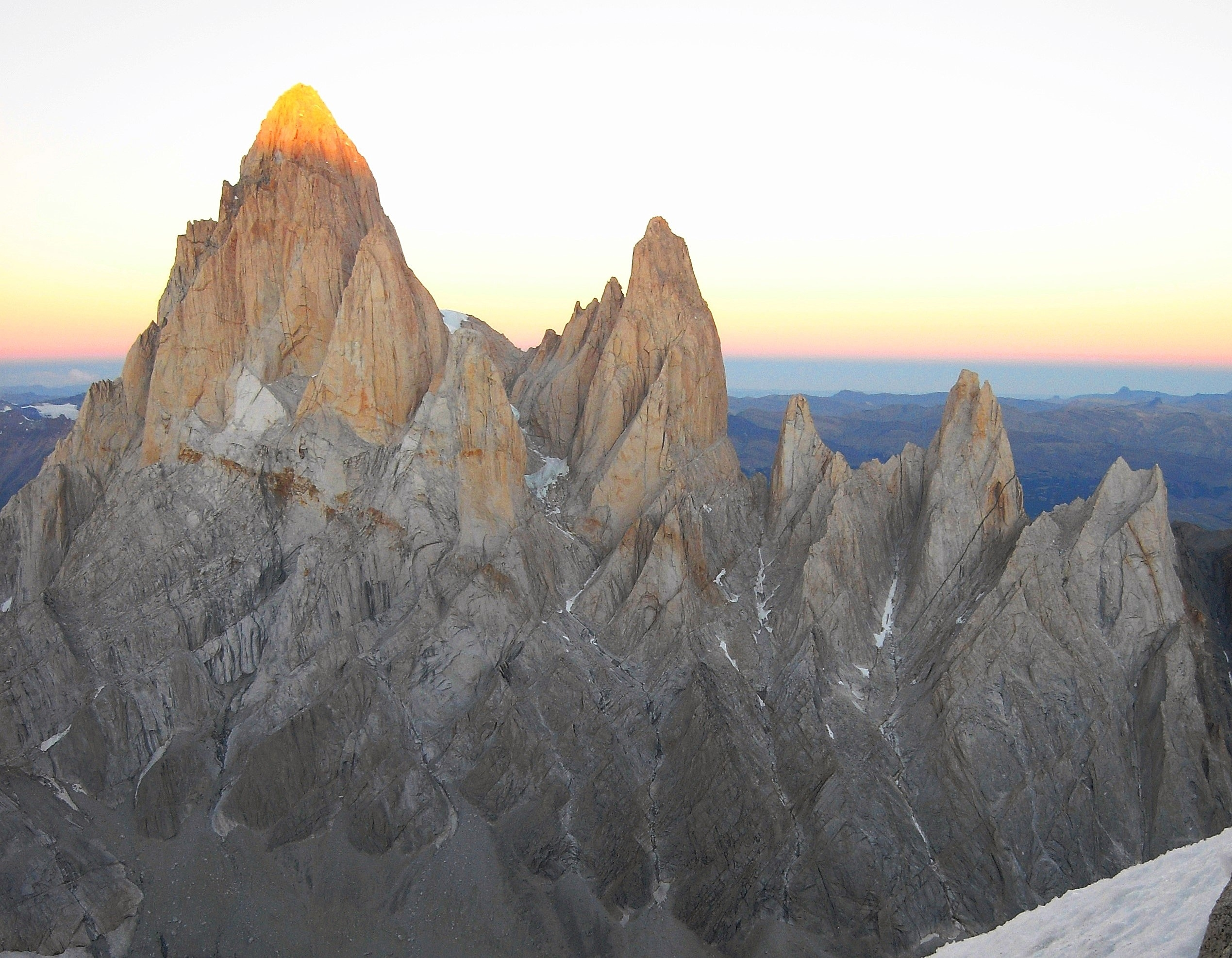
West aspect of Aguja Poincenot (centered), Fitz Roy (left)

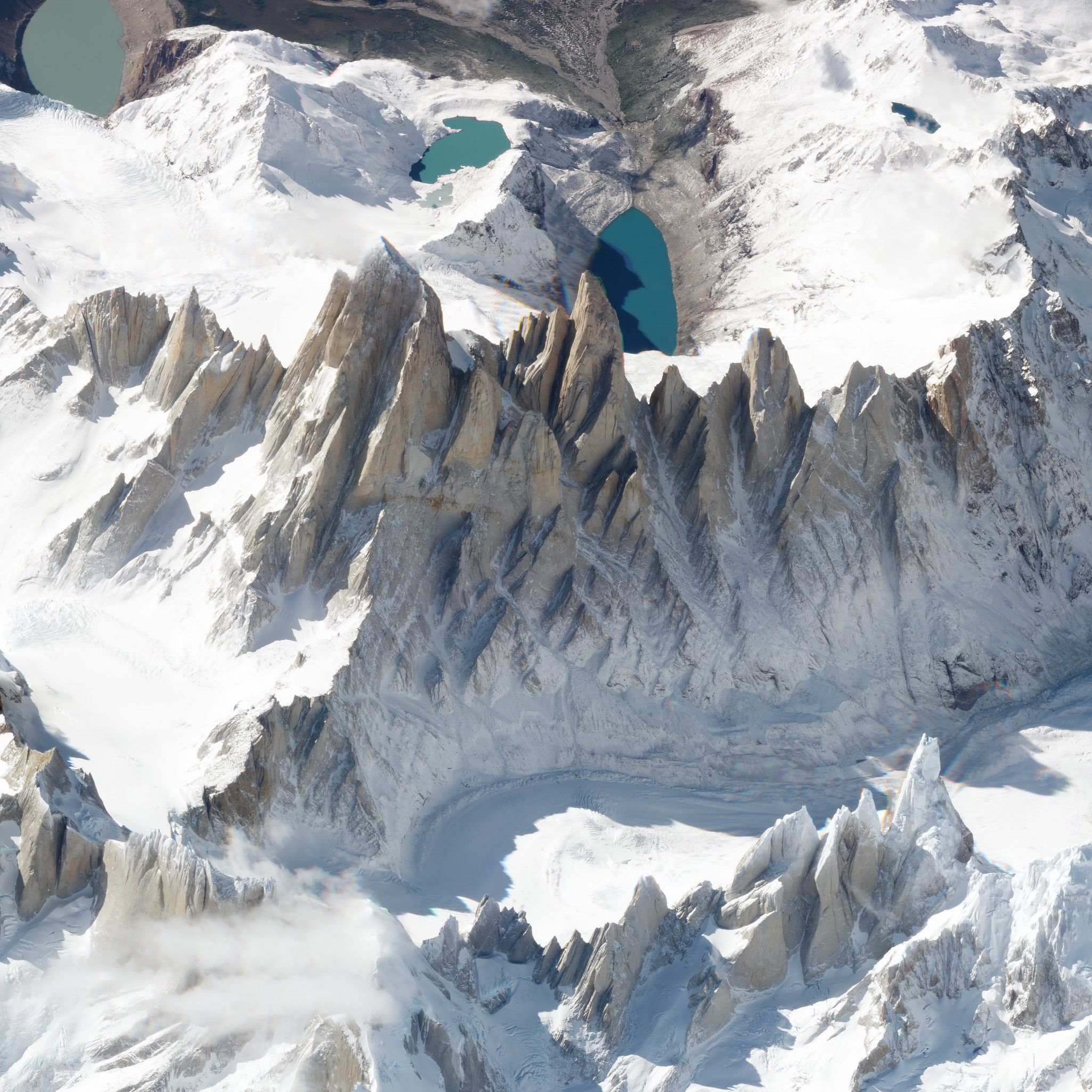
Aguja Poincenot centered in frame

== See also ==
- List of mountains in Argentina
