= Aguja Mermoz =

Mountain in Argentina

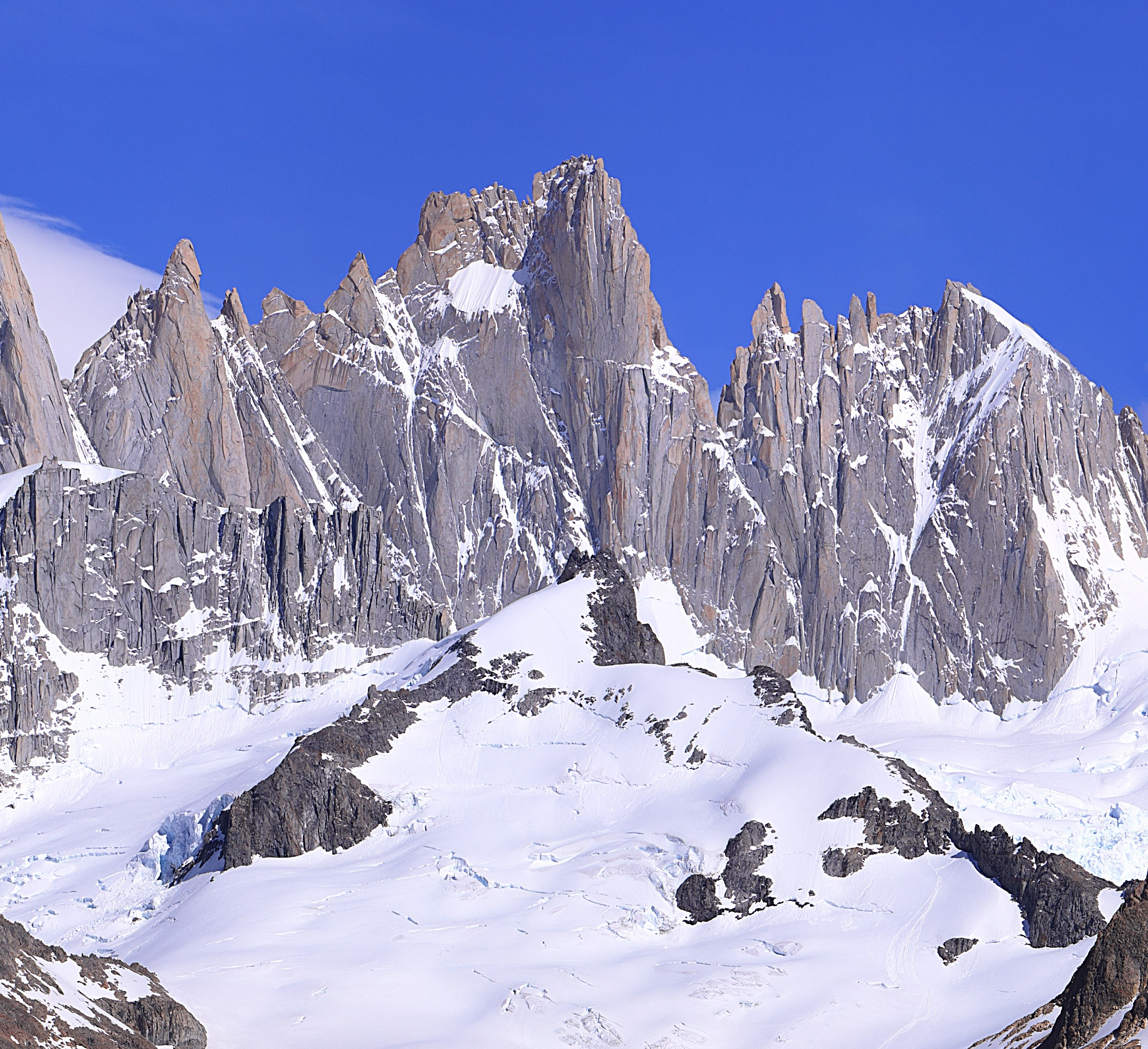
- East aspect

Highest point
- Elevation: 2,732 m (8,963 ft)
- Prominence: 172 m (564 ft)
- Parent peak: Fitz Roy
- Isolation: 0.96 km (0.60 mi)
- Coordinates: 49°15′49″S 73°02′15″W

Naming
- Etymology: Jean Mermoz

Geography
- Location within Argentina Location within South America Location within Southern Patagonia
- Interactive map of Aguja Mermoz
- Country: Argentina
- Province: Santa Cruz
- Protected area: Los Glaciares National Park
- Parent range: Andes
- Topo map: IGN 4769‑III El Chaltén

Geology
- Rock age: Cretaceous
- Rock type: Granite

Climbing
- First ascent: 1974

Aguja Mermoz is a mountain in Santa Cruz Province, Argentina.

== Description ==
Aguja Mermoz is a 2,732-meter-elevation (8,963-foot) summit in the Andes. The peak is located one kilometer (0.6 mile) northeast of Fitz Roy and 13 kilometers (8 miles) northwest of El Chaltén, in Los Glaciares National Park of Patagonia. Precipitation runoff from the mountain's slopes drains to Viedma Lake. Topographic relief is significant as the summit rises 1,510 meters (4,954 ft) above Laguna Piedras Blancas in 4.5 kilometers (2.8 miles), and 1,250 meters (4,100 ft) above the North Fitz Roy Glacier in one kilometer (0.6 mi). The first ascent of the summit was made in 1974 by Héctor Cuiñas, Fermín Olaechea, and Guillermo Vieiro via the northwest face. The toponym, which translates as Mermoz Needle, was applied by Louis Lliboutry in 1952 to honor Jean Mermoz (1901–1936), a pioneer aviator in South America. The nearest higher peak is Fitz Roy, 0.96 kilometer (0.6 mile) to the south-southwest.

== Climbing ==
Established climbing routes with first ascents:

- Northwest Face – 1974 – Héctor Cuiñas, Fermín Olaechea, Guillermo Vieiro
- Cosas Patagónicas (NW Face) – 1989 – Antonio Colombo, Giorgio Confalonieri, Davide Corbetta, Danilo Galbiati, Giulio Maggioni, Vanni Spinelli, Ezio Tanzi
- Vol de Nuit (East Face) – 1993 – Andy Parkin
- Ferrari-Ceballos (East Face) – 1994 – Martín Ceballos, Casimiro Ferrari
- Hypermermoz (NW Face) – 1996 – Maurizio Giordani, Aldo Levitti
- Pilar Rojo (East Face) – 1999 – Kurt Albert, Bernd Arnold
- Barriga Patagonica (West Face) – 2000 – Zlatko Koren, Klemen Mali
- Northwest Ridge – 2001 – Zlatko Koren, Vasja Kosuta
- Jardines Japoneses (East Face) – 2010 – Colin Haley, Jens Holsten, Mikey Schaefer
- ¿Qué mirás, bobo? (East Face) – 2023 – Matteo Della Bordella, Leo Gheza, Sean Villanueva

== Climate ==
According to the Köppen climate classification system, Aguja Mermoz is located in a tundra climate zone with cold, snowy winters, and cool summers. Weather systems are forced upward by the mountains (orographic lift), causing moisture to drop in the form of rain and snow. This climate supports the Piedras Blancas Glacier below the east slope of the peak and the North Fitz Roy Glacier to the west. The months of November through March offer the most favorable weather for visiting or climbing in this area.

== Gallery ==
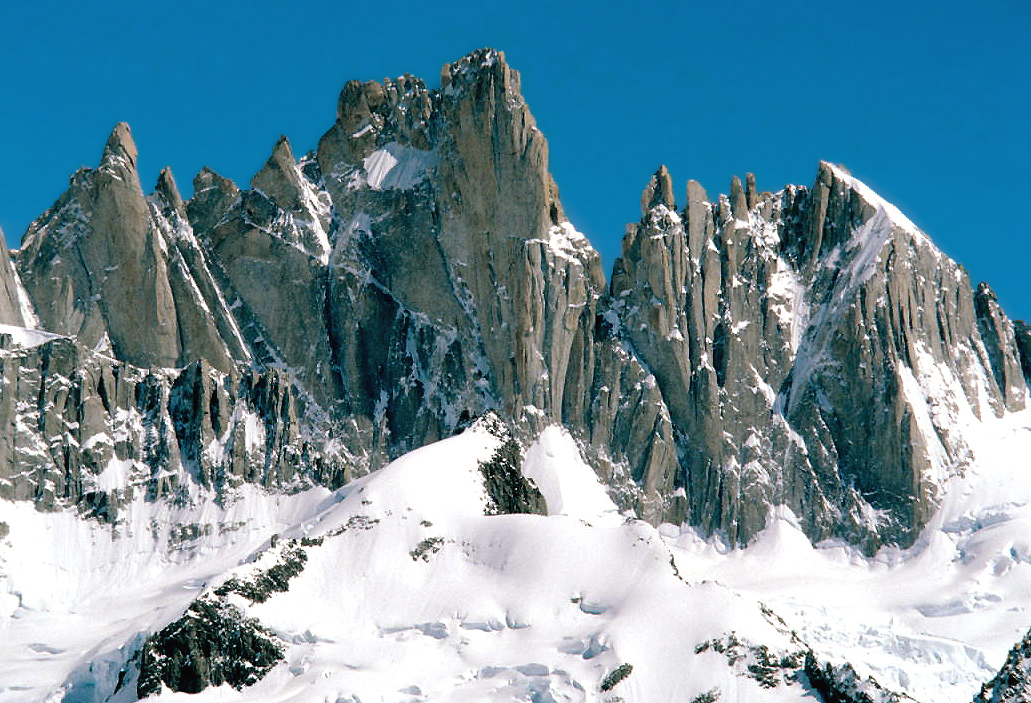
East aspect, with Aguja Guillaumet to right

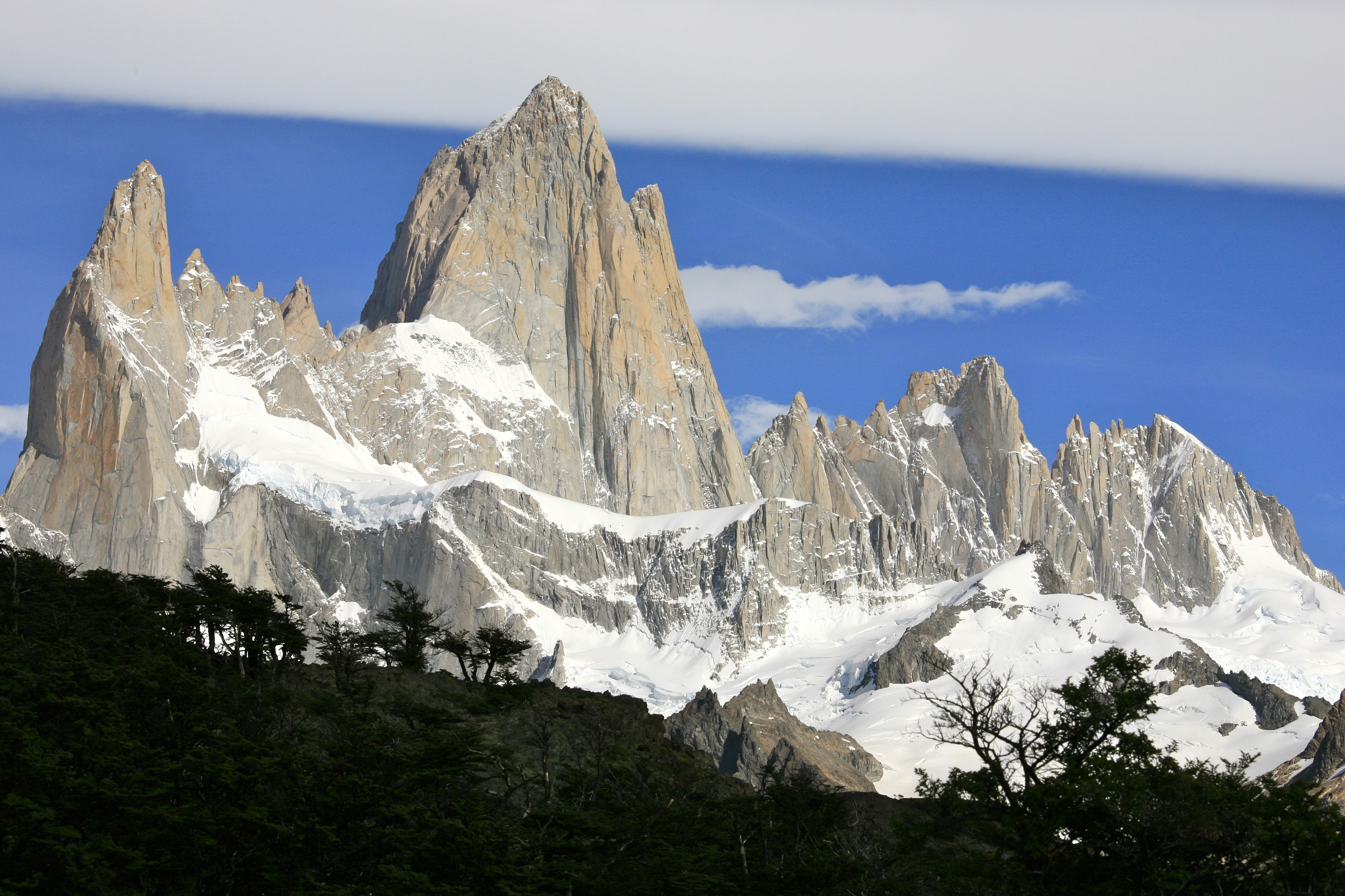
Aguja Poincenot (left), Fitz Roy, Aguja Mermoz

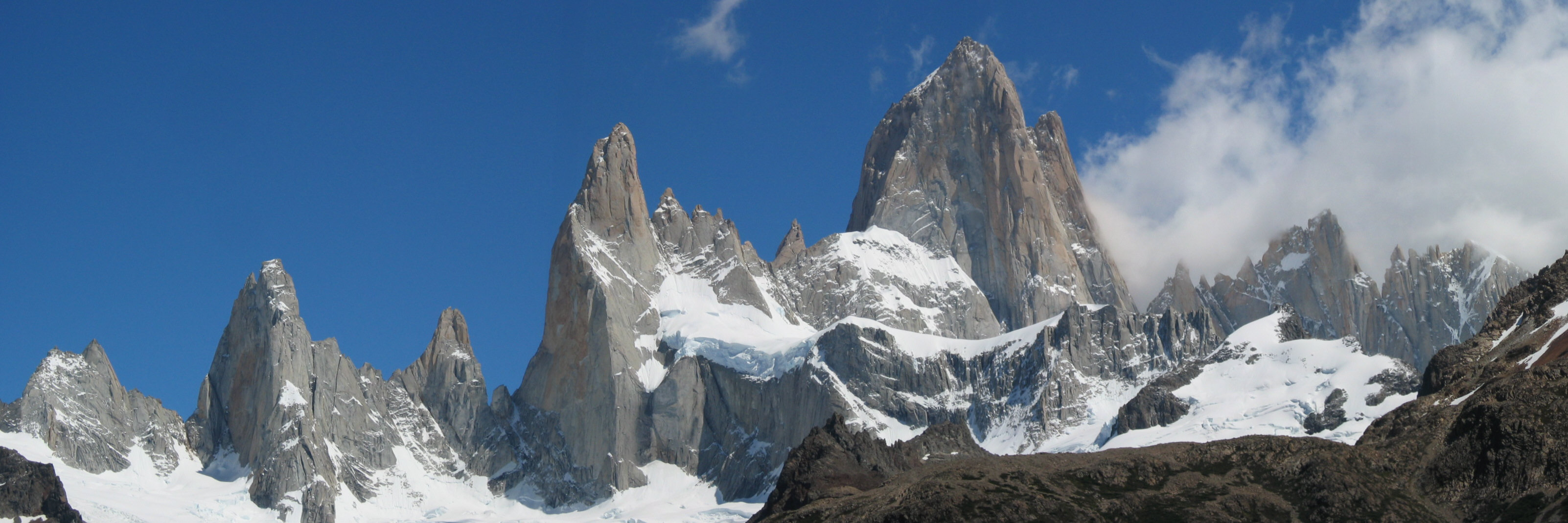
Aguja Mermoz to right of Fitz Roy

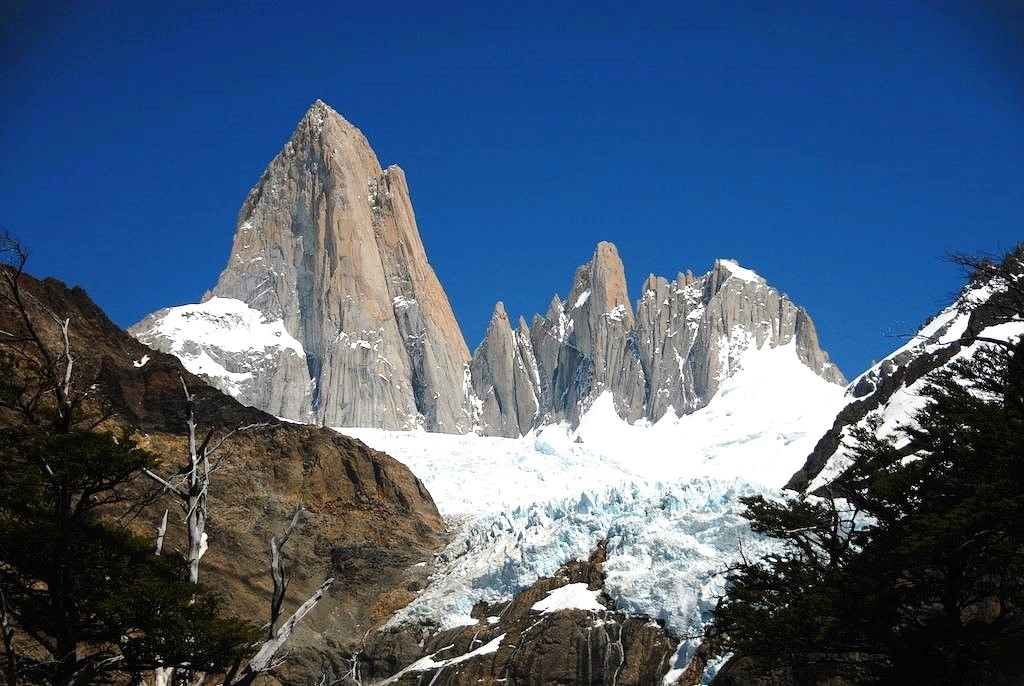
Fitz Roy (left) and Aguja Mermoz rise above Glaciar Piedras Blancas

== See also ==
- List of mountains in Argentina
