= El Chaltén =

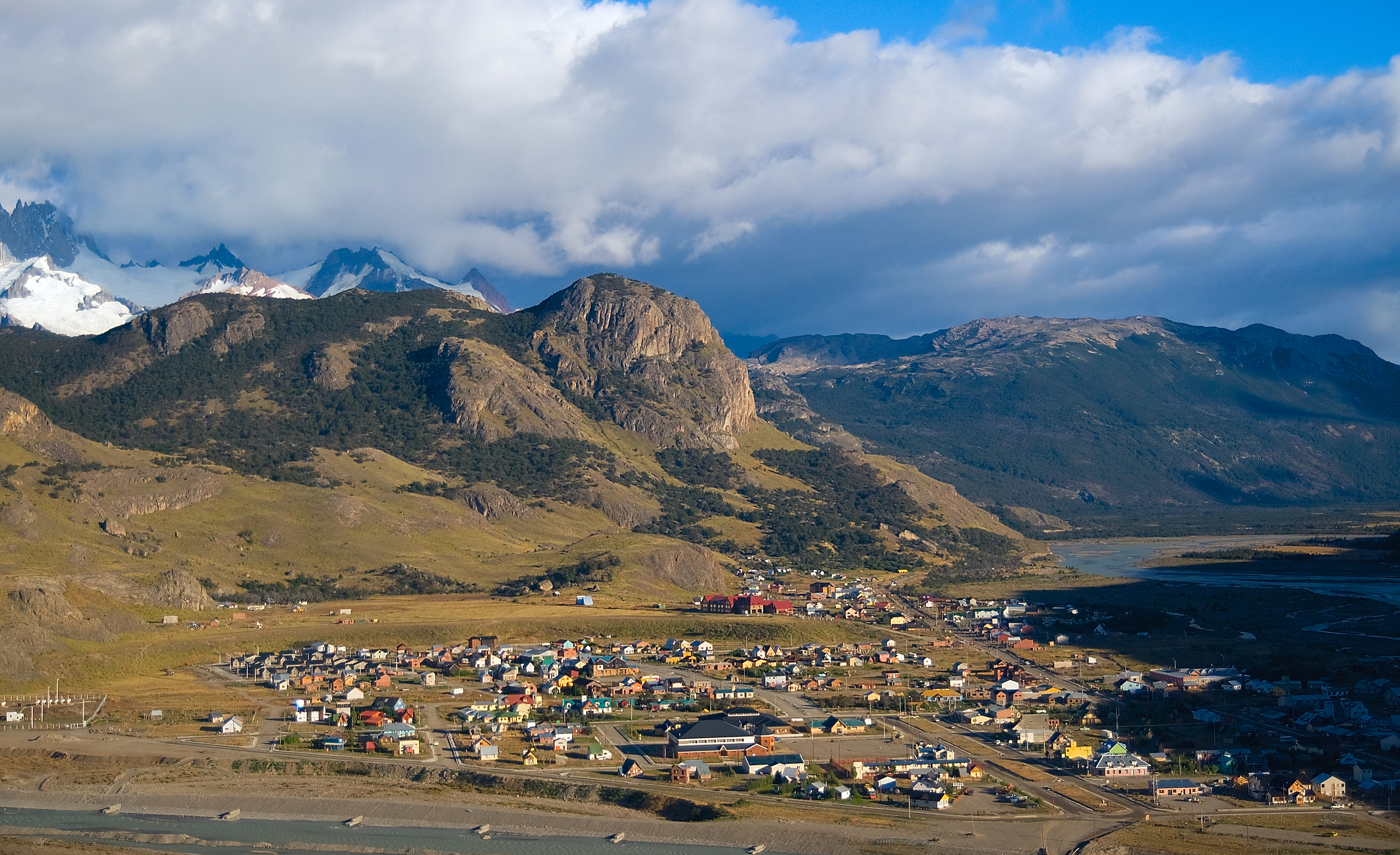
- El Chaltén

- Flag Coat of arms

- Location of El Chaltén in Argentina El Chaltén (Argentina)
- Coordinates: 49°19′53.069″S 72°53′10.064″W
- Country: Argentina
- Province: Santa Cruz
- Department: Lago Argentino

Government
  - Intendant: Néstor Ticó (PJ)
- Elevation: 397 m (1,302 ft)

Population (2022 Census)
  - Total: 1,861
- Time zone: UTC−3 (ART)

El Chaltén is a small mountain village in Santa Cruz Province, Argentina. It is located on the riverside of Rio de las Vueltas, within the Los Glaciares National Park (section Reserva Nacional Zona Viedma) near the base of Cerro Torre and Cerro Fitz Roy spires, both popular for climbing. It is 220 kilometres (140 mi) north of El Calafate. It is also a popular base for hiking numerous trails, such as those to the base of surrounding peaks and glacial lakes, such as Laguna Torre and Laguna de los Tres (near the base of Fitz Roy).

For those reasons, El Chaltén was named Argentina's Trekking Capital or Capital Nacional del Trekking. In 1985, Argentina and Chile had a border dispute over El Chaltén. There was no war, and El Chaltén was awarded to Argentina. Homes, government buildings, and flags of Argentina went up to mark the city settlement.

The town is located at the edge of the 12,363 km^{2} (4,773 mi^{2}) Southern Patagonian Ice Field and about 3000 inhabitants live there throughout all the seasons of the year. Snow and ice mostly fence the town, and the homes are low structured with roads mostly made of rocks and dirt.

== Etymology ==
"Chaltén" is a Tehuelche word meaning "smoking mountain".

In 1877, Argentine explorer Francisco Moreno named mount Chaltén as mount Fitz Roy, in honour of Robert FitzRoy, captain during the Second voyage of HMS Beagle in the 1830s. It has its own flag and coat of arms.

== Tourism ==
The village has commercial camping grounds, mostly for backpackers.

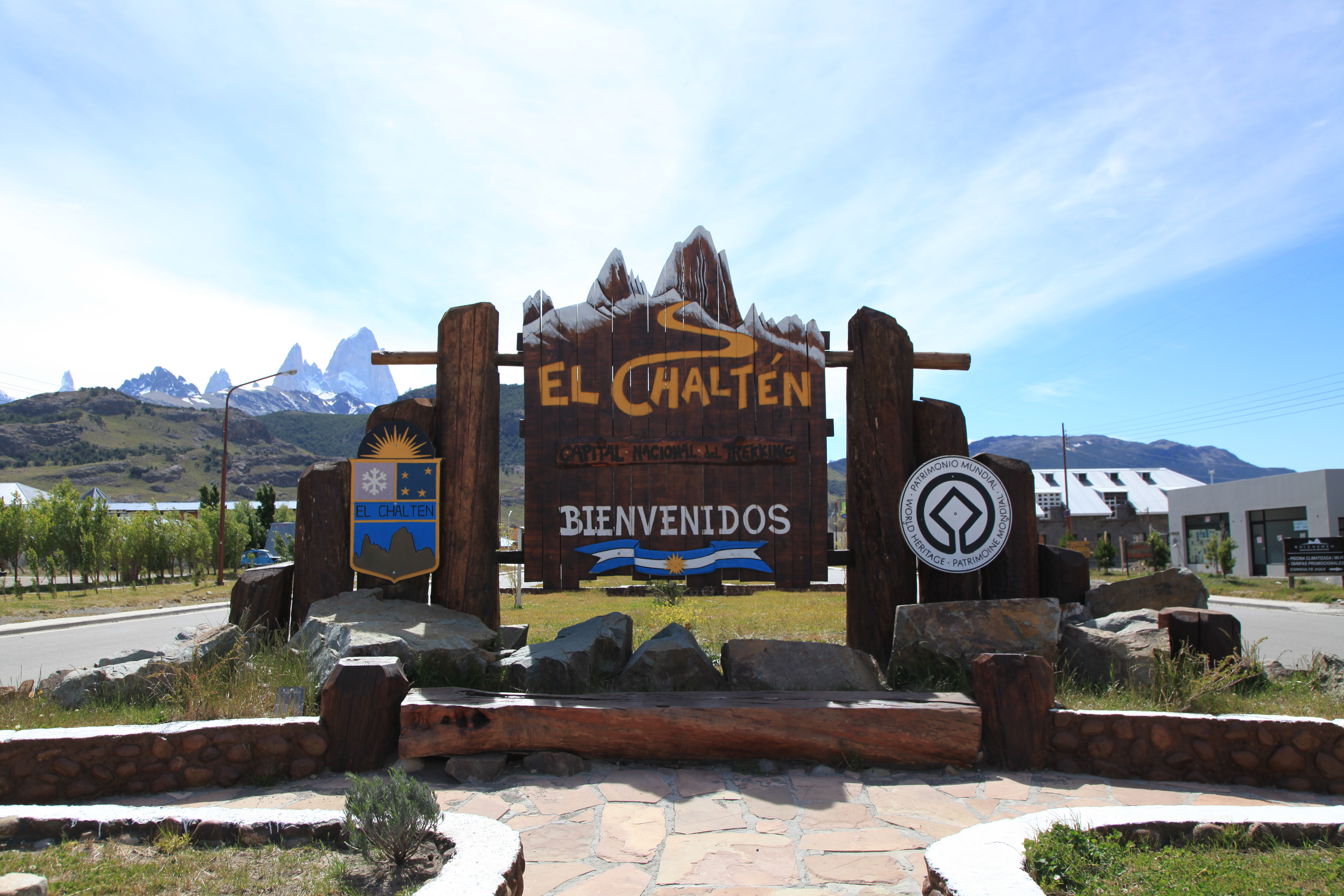
El Chaltén

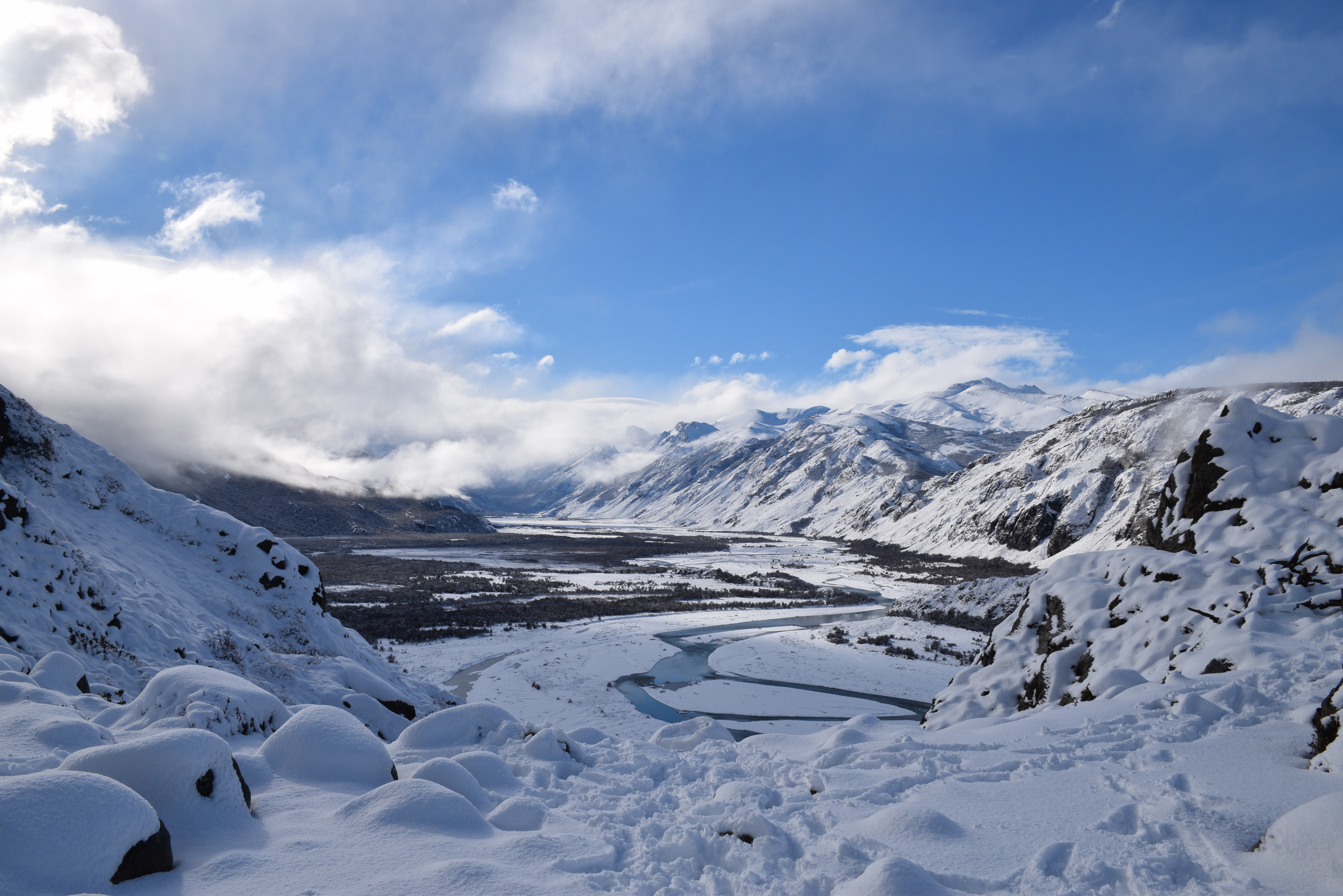
Hiking trails leading north from El Chaltén.

== Climate ==
El Chaltén has an unpredictable subpolar oceanic climate (Köppen Cfc) with subantarctic continental (Dfc) influences, with precipitation distributed on a large number of days despite not being nearly as heavy as in Chilean Patagonia; bad weather is exceedingly common. Summers experience long daylight hours, very windy weather, and cool temperatures, mostly below 18 °C (64.4 °F) during the day and below 5 °C (41 °F) during the night. Frost can and does occur in the summer too. Winters bring snow in moderate quantities, and average temperatures around 3 °C (37.4 °F) during the day and −4 °C (24.8 °F) during the night; however, the coldest nights are much colder than this. Spring and fall are variable, but generally cold as well.

Climate data for El Chaltén (1941–1950)
Month	Jan	Feb	Mar	Apr	May	Jun	Jul	Aug	Sep	Oct	Nov	Dec	Year
Record high °C (°F)	30.3 (86.5)	28.4 (83.1)	25.6 (78.1)	23.8 (74.8)	20.4 (68.7)	19.9 (67.8)	17.5 (63.5)	17.6 (63.7)	19.5 (67.1)	22.5 (72.5)	25.2 (77.4)	26.5 (79.7)	30.3 (86.5)
Mean daily maximum °C (°F)	18.0 (64.4)	17.0 (62.6)	14.7 (58.5)	11.7 (53.1)	6.6 (43.9)	4.4 (39.9)	4.3 (39.7)	5.0 (41.0)	7.9 (46.2)	11.8 (53.2)	13.9 (57.0)	16.2 (61.2)	11.0 (51.8)
Daily mean °C (°F)	12.2 (54.0)	11.4 (52.5)	9.1 (48.4)	6.4 (43.5)	2.0 (35.6)	0.0 (32.0)	−0.1 (31.8)	0.3 (32.5)	2.5 (36.5)	6.3 (43.3)	8.4 (47.1)	11.0 (51.8)	5.8 (42.4)
Mean daily minimum °C (°F)	7.8 (46.0)	7.3 (45.1)	4.6 (40.3)	2.1 (35.8)	−1.9 (28.6)	−3.9 (25.0)	−4.0 (24.8)	−4.2 (24.4)	−0.8 (30.6)	2.6 (36.7)	4.4 (39.9)	7.1 (44.8)	1.8 (35.2)
Record low °C (°F)	−1.5 (29.3)	−2.5 (27.5)	−3.3 (26.1)	−13.0 (8.6)	−14.5 (5.9)	−20.2 (−4.4)	−16.3 (2.7)	−14.8 (5.4)	−11.3 (11.7)	−3.3 (26.1)	−4.4 (24.1)	−2.0 (28.4)	−20.2 (−4.4)
Average precipitation mm (inches)	58 (2.3)	62 (2.4)	67 (2.6)	92 (3.6)	92 (3.6)	90 (3.5)	73 (2.9)	67 (2.6)	49 (1.9)	63 (2.5)	45 (1.8)	50 (2.0)	808 (31.8)
Source: Sistema de Clasificación Bioclimática Mundial

== Flood risk ==
It is known that the town is at risk of a possible glacial lake outburst flood (Glof) that could occur at Laguna Torre, in a similar, though lesser, way that catastrophic flash floods caused devastation in Nepal and Tibet on 26 August 2026. Such an event is considered likely, although it is not possible to predict when; authorities from Los Glaciares National Park, the municipality of El Chaltén, local organisations, and scientific institutions, are developing the first Glof early-warning system and draft evacuation protocols in Argentina. The Torre glacier lost about 4 sq km (1.5 sq miles) of surface area between 1952 and 2023, and its ice thinned by 60 to 70 metres, also causing landslides and rockfalls as the retreat of the ice changed stresses in the surrounding slopes. Large landslides collapsing into Laguna Torre could trigger a destructive flash flood.

== Gallery ==
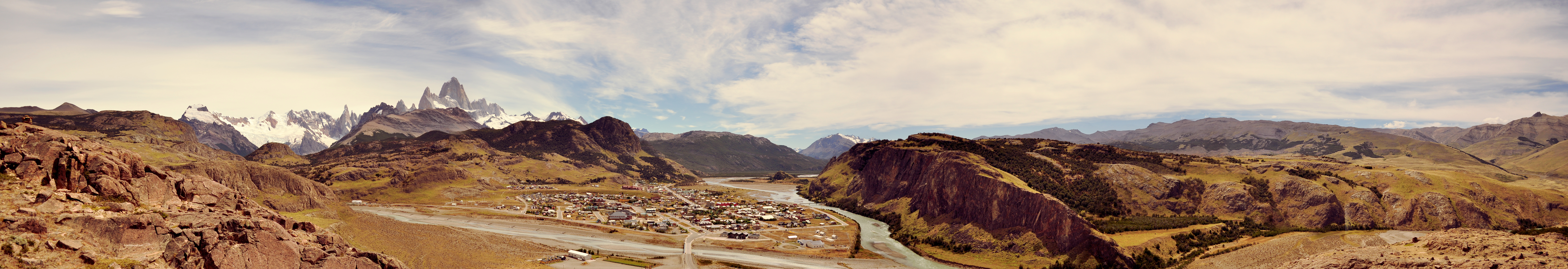
Panoramic view of El Chaltén. Peaks on the skyline include Cerro Adela, Cerro Torre, and Fitz Roy.
