= Cerro Rincón =

Mountain in Chile and Argentina

Coordinates: 49°16′00″S 73°08′00″W

- Monte Fitz Roy (left), Cerro Rincón and Cerro Aniversario (in foreground)

Highest point
- Elevation: 2,422 m (7,946 ft)

Geography
- Location within Southern Patagonia
- Location: Southern Patagonia, Argentina and Chile
- Parent range: Andes

The Cerro Rincón is a glacier-covered mountain of the Southern Patagonian Ice Field in Patagonia, located on the border between Chile and Argentina. It lies west of Cerro Domo Blanco, south of the Marconi Glacier, and in the northern part of the Circo de los Altares. It stands at an altitude of 2,422 m (7,946 ft).

On the Chilean side, it is part of the Bernardo O'Higgins National Park.

Chile previously claimed the entirety of the mountain. However, following the arbitration ruling in the Laguna del Desierto dispute in 1994, the boundary was set on the mountain, recognizing it as a binational landmark by both countries.
