= Cerro Domo Blanco =

Mountain in Chile and Argentina

Coordinates: 49°16′02″S 73°06′18″W

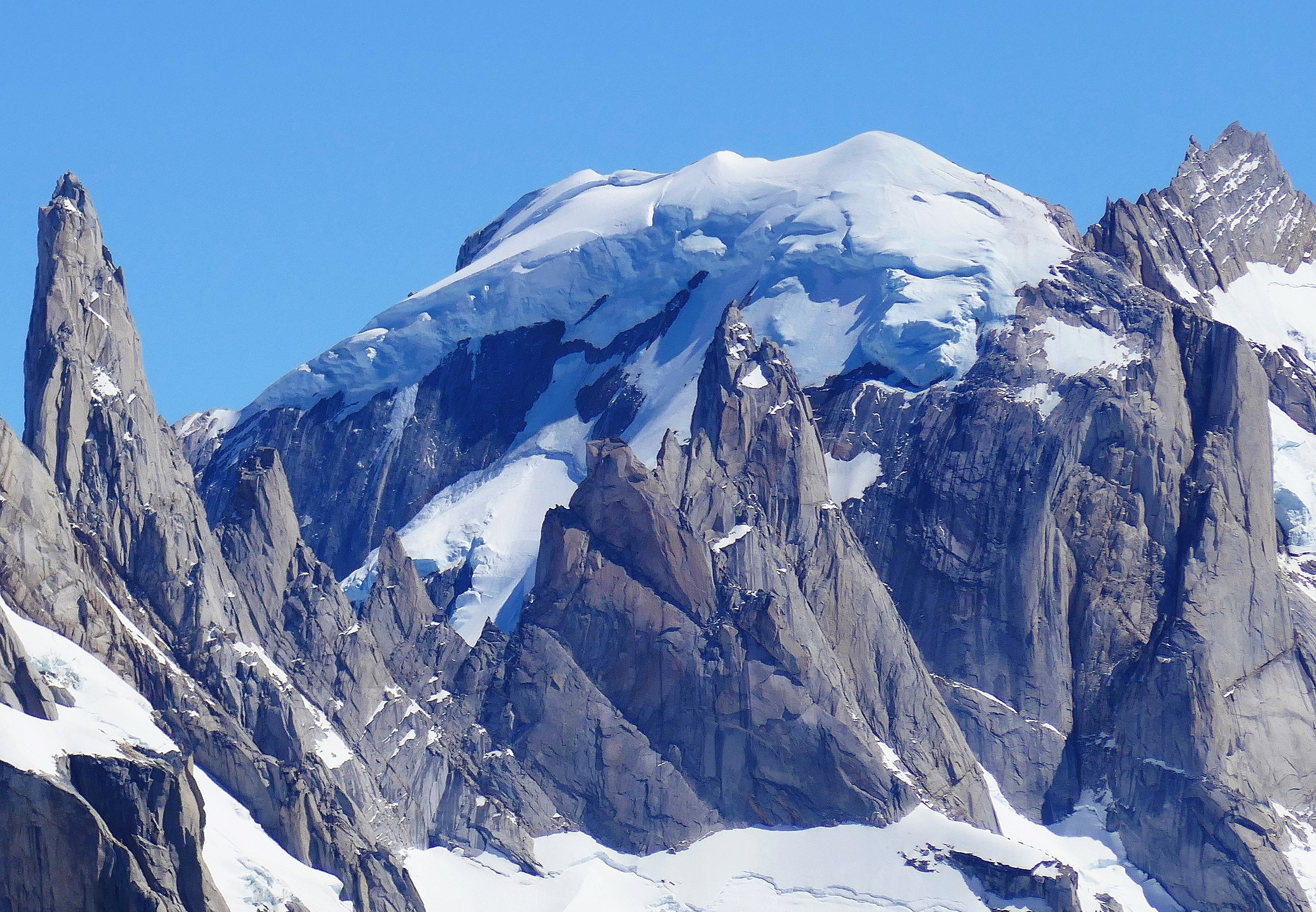
- Southeast aspect centered in back

Highest point
- Elevation: 2,465 m (8,087 ft)

Geography
- Location within Southern Patagonia
- Location: Southern Patagonia, Argentina and Chile
- Protected areas: Chaltén Mountain Range Natural Site; Bernardo O'Higgins National Park
- Parent range: Andes

The Cerro Domo Blanco is a glacier-covered mountain of the Southern Patagonian Ice Field in Patagonia, located on the border between Chile and Argentina. It lies west of Mount Fitz Roy, east of Cerro Rincón, and in the northern part of the Circo de los Altares. It stands at an altitude of 2,465 m (8,087 ft).

On the Chilean side, it is part of the Bernardo O'Higgins National Park, while its eastern side lies within the Chaltén Mountain Range Natural Site, which is part of the park.

Chile previously claimed the entirety of the mountain. However, following the arbitration ruling in the Laguna del Desierto dispute in 1994, the boundary was set on the mountain, recognizing it as a binational landmark by both countries.
