= Cerro Pollone =

Mountain in Chile and Argentina

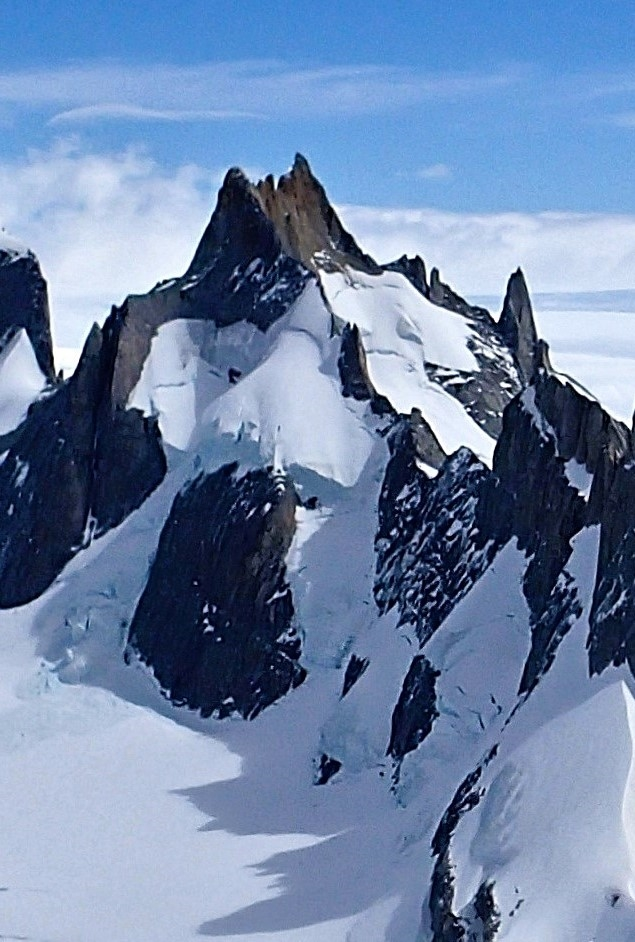
- East aspect, viewed from Aguja Guillaumet

Highest point
- Elevation: 2,600 m (8,500 ft)
- Coordinates: 49°15′11″S 73°05′23″W

Geography
- Location within Southern Patagonia
- Location: Argentina and Chile
- Parent range: Andes

Climbing
- First ascent: Jim Toman and Neil Kauffman.

Cerro Pollone is a glaciated mountain of the Southern Patagonian Ice Field in Patagonia, located on the border between Chile and Argentina, west of Mount Fitz Roy, west of Cerro Domo Blanco and in the northern part of the Chaltén mountain range. It has an altitude of 2600 meters above sea level.

On the Chilean side it is located in the Bernardo O'Higgins National Park, being its eastern side in the Chaltén Mountain Range Natural Site, which is an integral part of the park.

Previously Chile claimed the entire mountain, but after the arbitration decision of the dispute of the Desert Lagoon in 1994, the limit was defined in the hill, being recognized as a binational landmark by both countries.

== Ascents ==
In 2010, the first ascent of the east face was made by Jim Toman and Neil Kauffman.

In October 2015, Marc-André Leclerc attempted to climb Cerro Pollone but had to abandon the effort 30 meters from the summit.

In September 2016, Austrian alpinist Markus Pucher ascended the peak solo during the harsh Patagonian winter.
