= Cerro Piergiorgio =

Mountain in Chile and Argentina

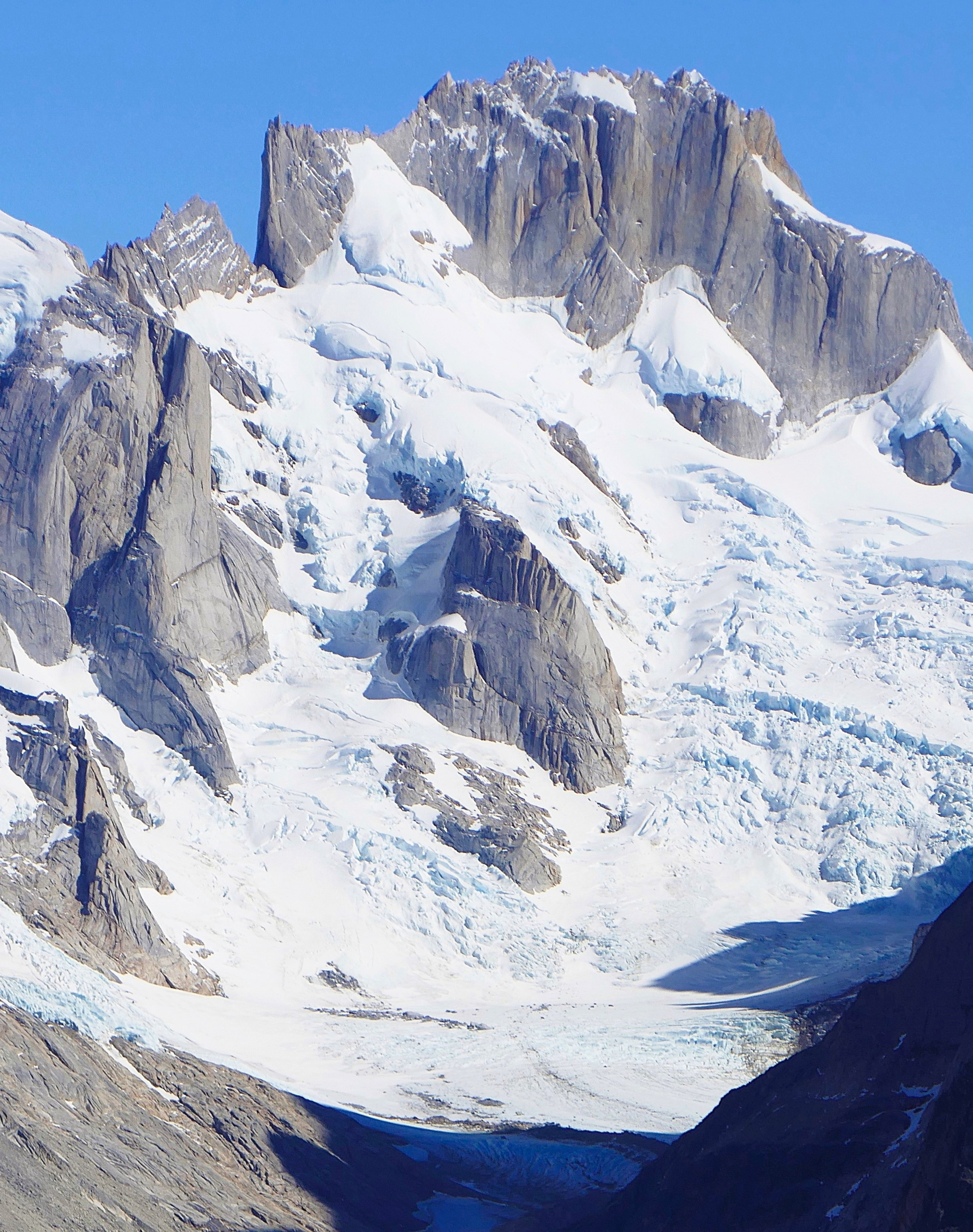
- Southeast aspect

Highest point
- Elevation: 2,719 m (8,921 ft)
- Coordinates: 49°15′42″S 73°6′5″W

Geography
- Location within Southern Patagonia Location within South America
- Location: Argentina and Chile
- Parent range: Andes

Cerro Piergiorgio is a mountain at the border between Argentina and Chile, on the Chilean side its on the Chaltén Mountain Range Natural Site in the Bernardo O'Higgins National Park. Its altitude is 2719 m. It is in Patagonia, in the Chilean Magallanes and Antártica Chilena region and in the Argentinian province of Santa Cruz, near the Argentinian village of El Chaltén.

On the Chilean side, it is located in the Bernardo O'Higgins National Park, being its eastern side in the Chaltén Mountain Range Natural Site, which is an integral part of the park.

Previously, Chile claimed the entire mountain, but after the arbitration decision of the dispute of the Desert Lagoon in 1994, the limit was defined in the hill, being recognized as a binational landmark by both countries.

== Toponomy ==
The mountain was baptized by the Salesian missionary Alberto Maria de Agostini, during one of his first explorations of the surrounding area in the summer of 1935, in honor of Pier Giorgio Frassati (1901-1925). This young Turinese was passionate about the mountains. A religious man, he saw in mountaineering a way to strengthen his spirit and get closer to God. He died young and was beatified in 1990 by Pope John Paul II.

== Gallery ==
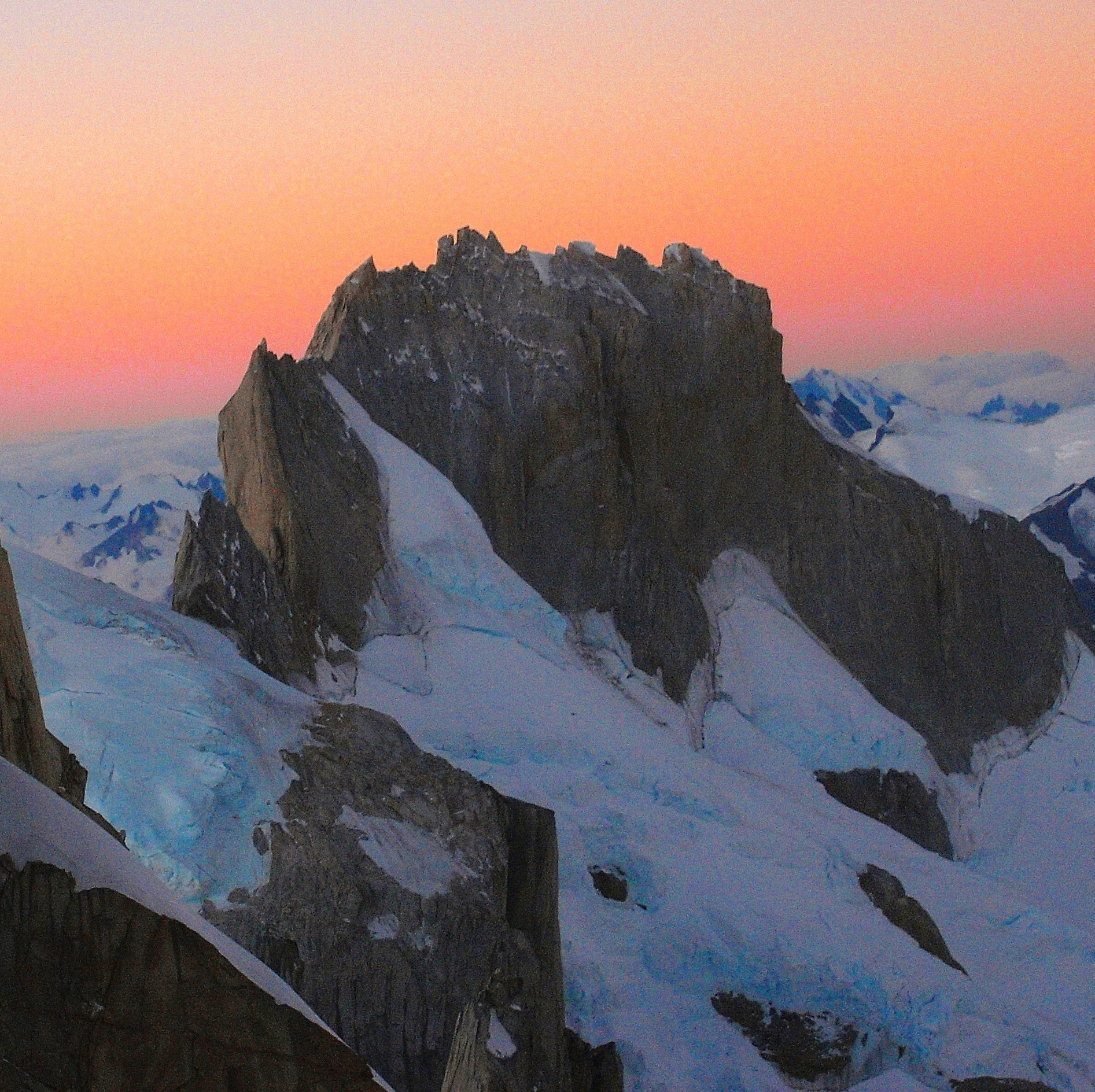
Cerro Piergiorgio viewed from Cerro Torre

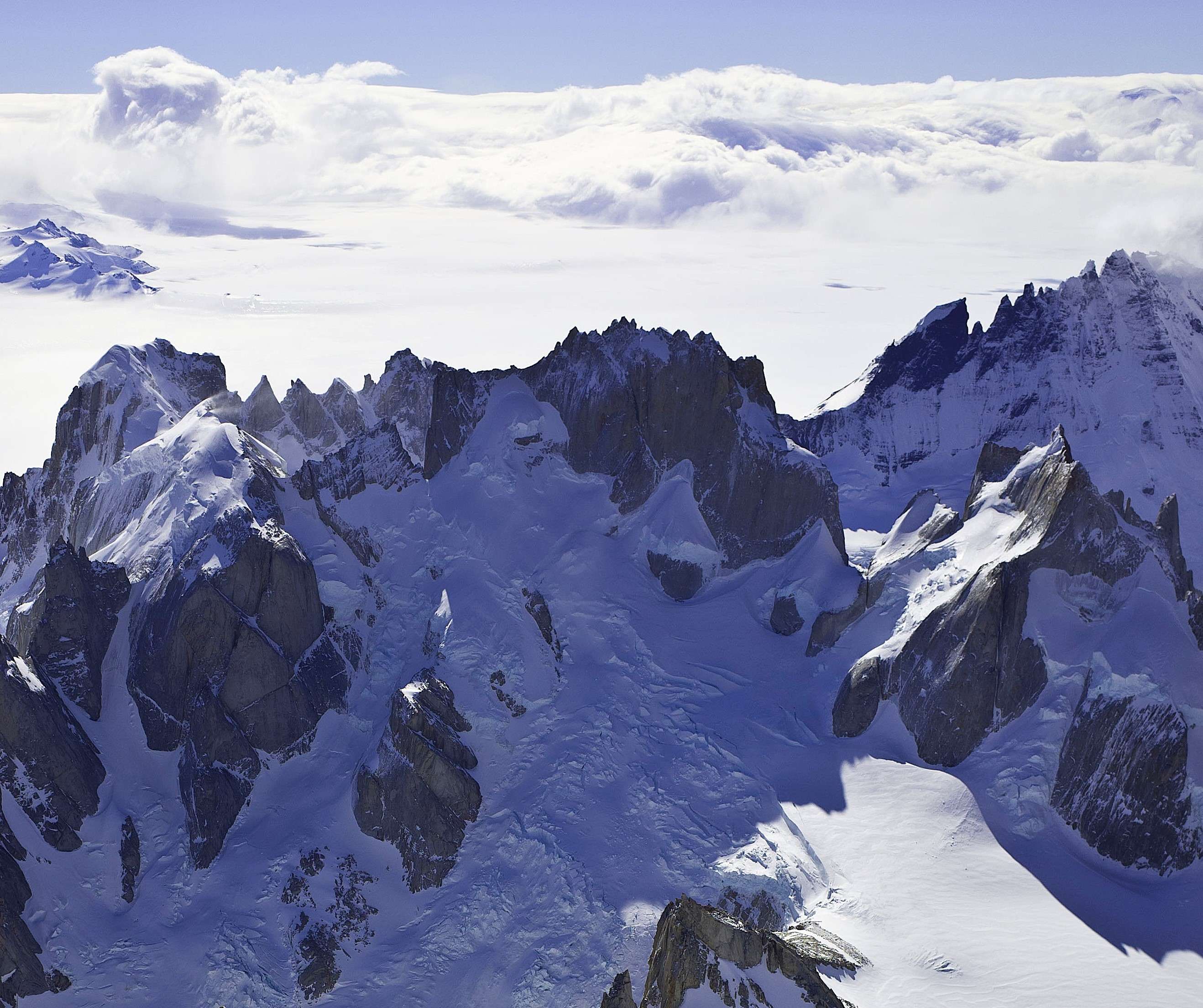
Cerro Piergiorgio (centered) viewed from Fitz Roy

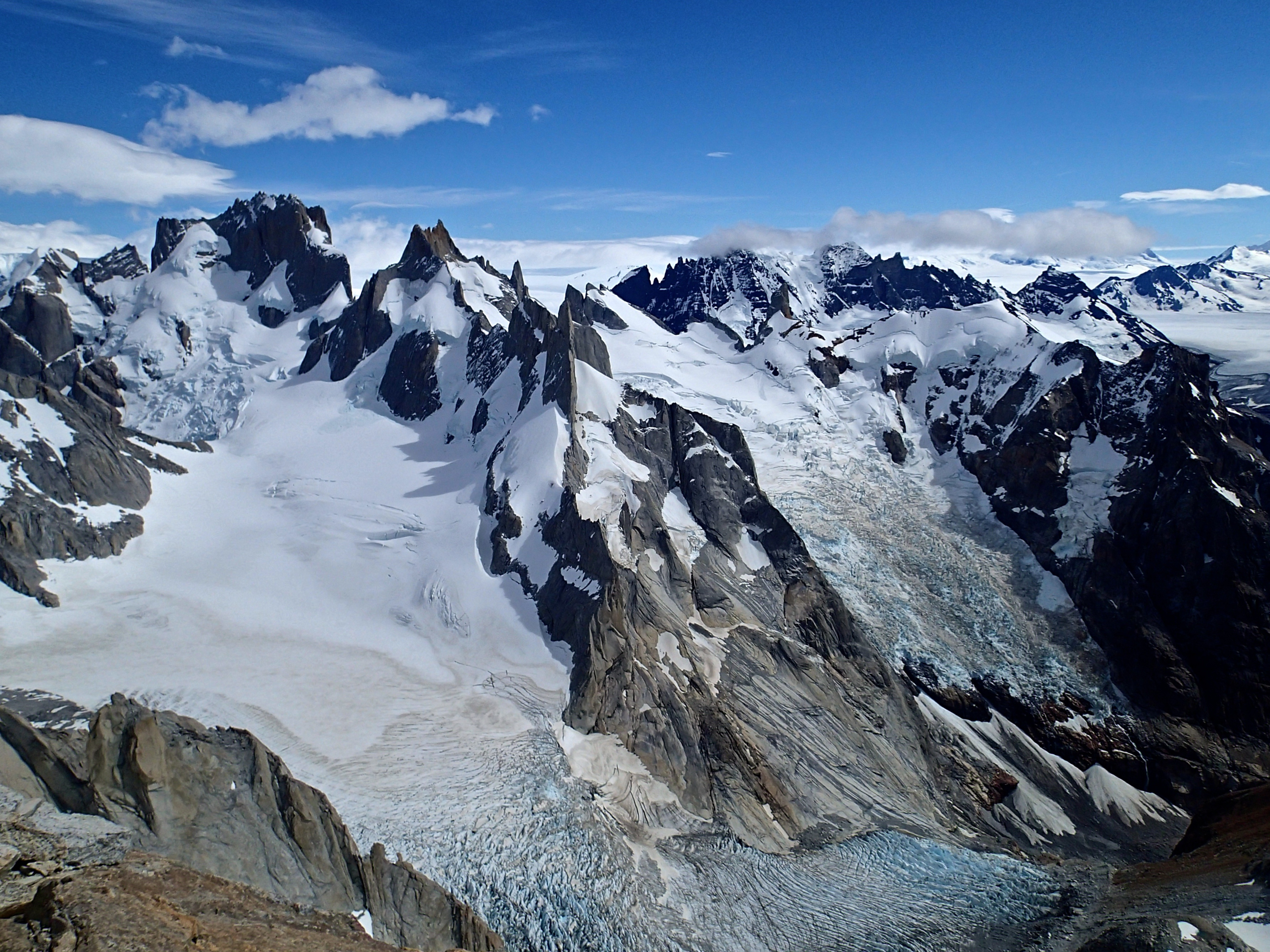
Cerro Piergiorgio in upper left corner
