= Chaltén Mountain Range Natural Site =

Protected natural area of Chile

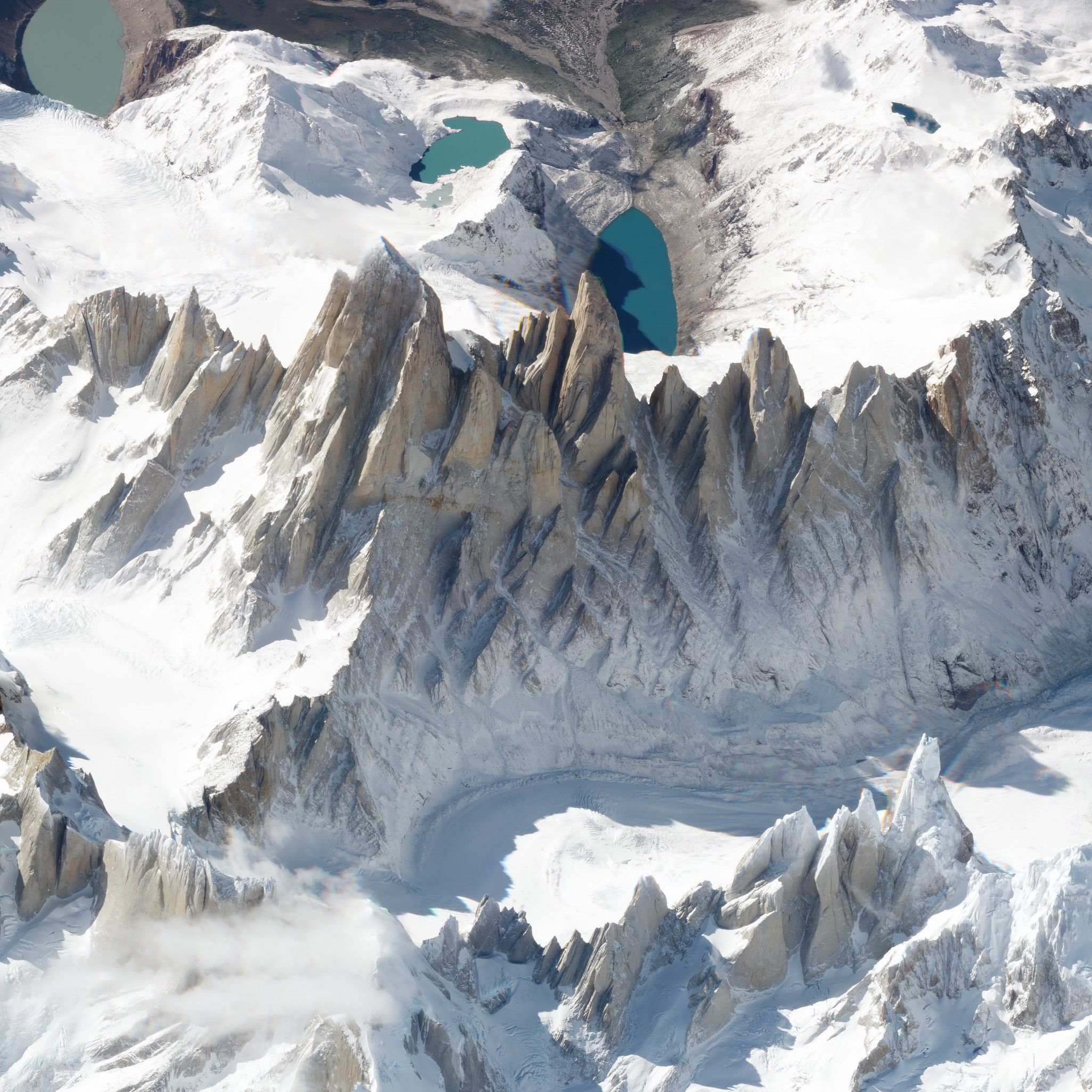
- The natural site as seen from the air

- Location within Magallanes and Chilean Antarctica Region Location within Chile
- Location: Magallanes and Chilean Antártica Region, Chile
- Nearest city: Villa O'Higgins, Aysén Region, Chile
- Coordinates: 49°16′15″S 73°04′33″W
- Area: 768 ha (1,898 acres)
- Established: February 27, 2014
- Governing body: Corporación Nacional Forestal

The Chaltén Mountain Range Natural Site (Spanish: Sitio Natural Cordillera del Chaltén) is a natural site part of the Bernardo O'Higgins National Park in the Magallanes and Chilean Antarctica Region, Chile. It is located between the boundary demarcated by the 1994 arbitration award and section B of the 1998 agreement between Argentina and Chile. It has an area of 768 hectares (1,900 acres).

It is located in between Mount Fitz Roy and the Torre Mountain Range covering the northern part of the basin of the Torre Glacier.

Within the natural site, the Fitz Roy (3,406 meters above sea level), Pollone, Piergiorgio mountains, as well as, the Standhardt, Desmochada, Silla needle, Domo Blanco, Bífida needle, Cuatro Dedos needle, CAT needle, point Anna, point Mujer as well as the Italian pass and part of the Fitz Roy North and Torre glaciers stand out in the Chaltén mountain range.

The nature reserve was created by Resolution No. 74 of February 27, 2014 by the National Forest Corporation which also created the Pío XI Glacier natural site in the national park.

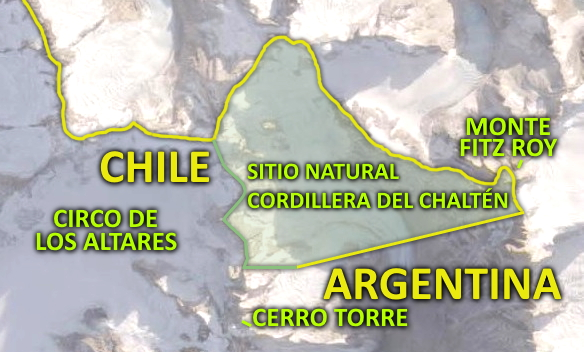
Satellital map of the place.

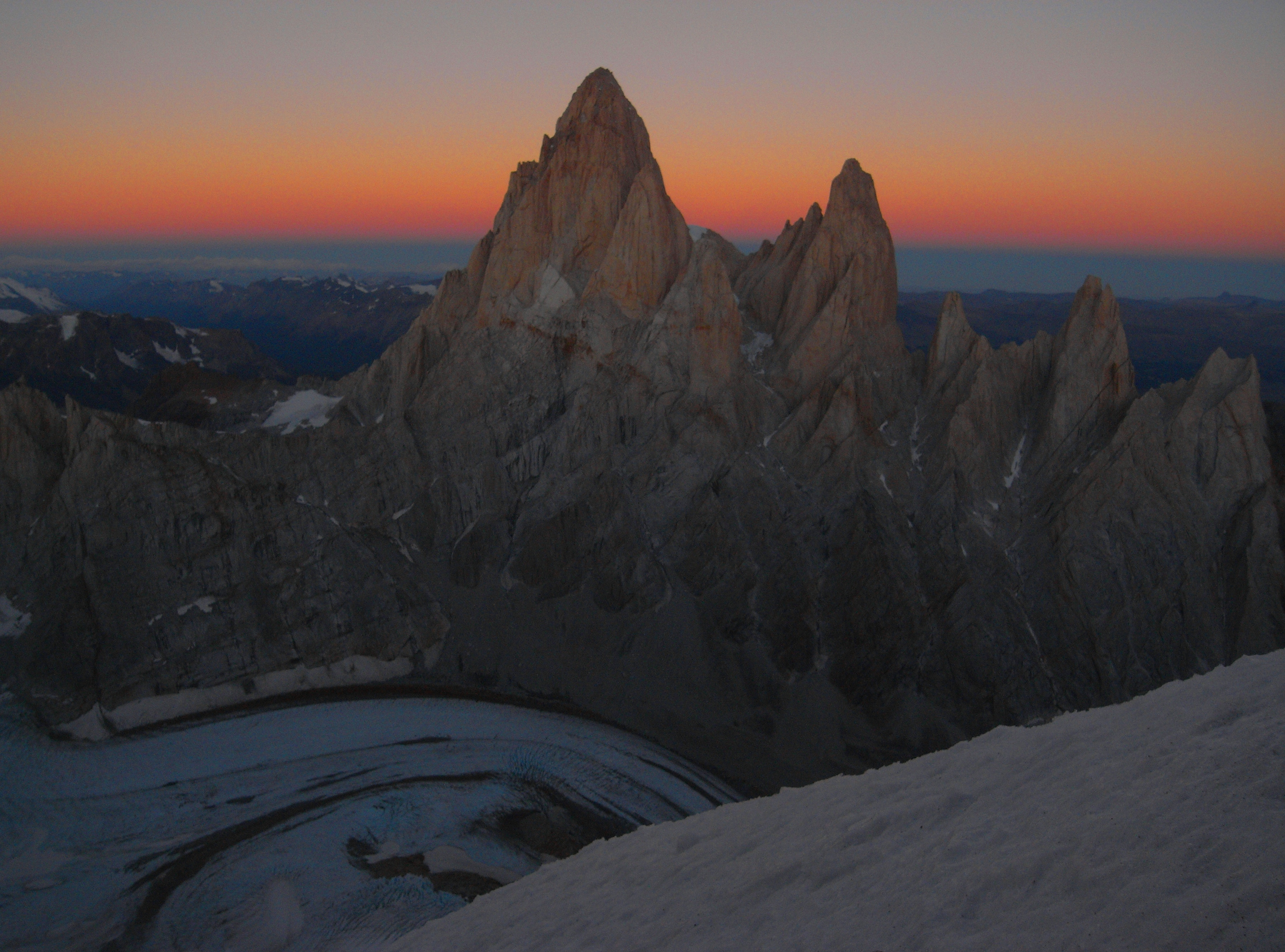
Sunset the Chaltén Mountain Range Natural Site, Chile.

== See also ==
- Circo de los Altares
- Mount Fitz Roy
- Cerro Torre
- Southern Patagonian Ice Field
- Bernardo O'Higgins National Park, Chile
- Los Glaciares National Park, Argentina
