= O'Higgins Glacier =

Glacier in the Southern Patagonian Ice Field

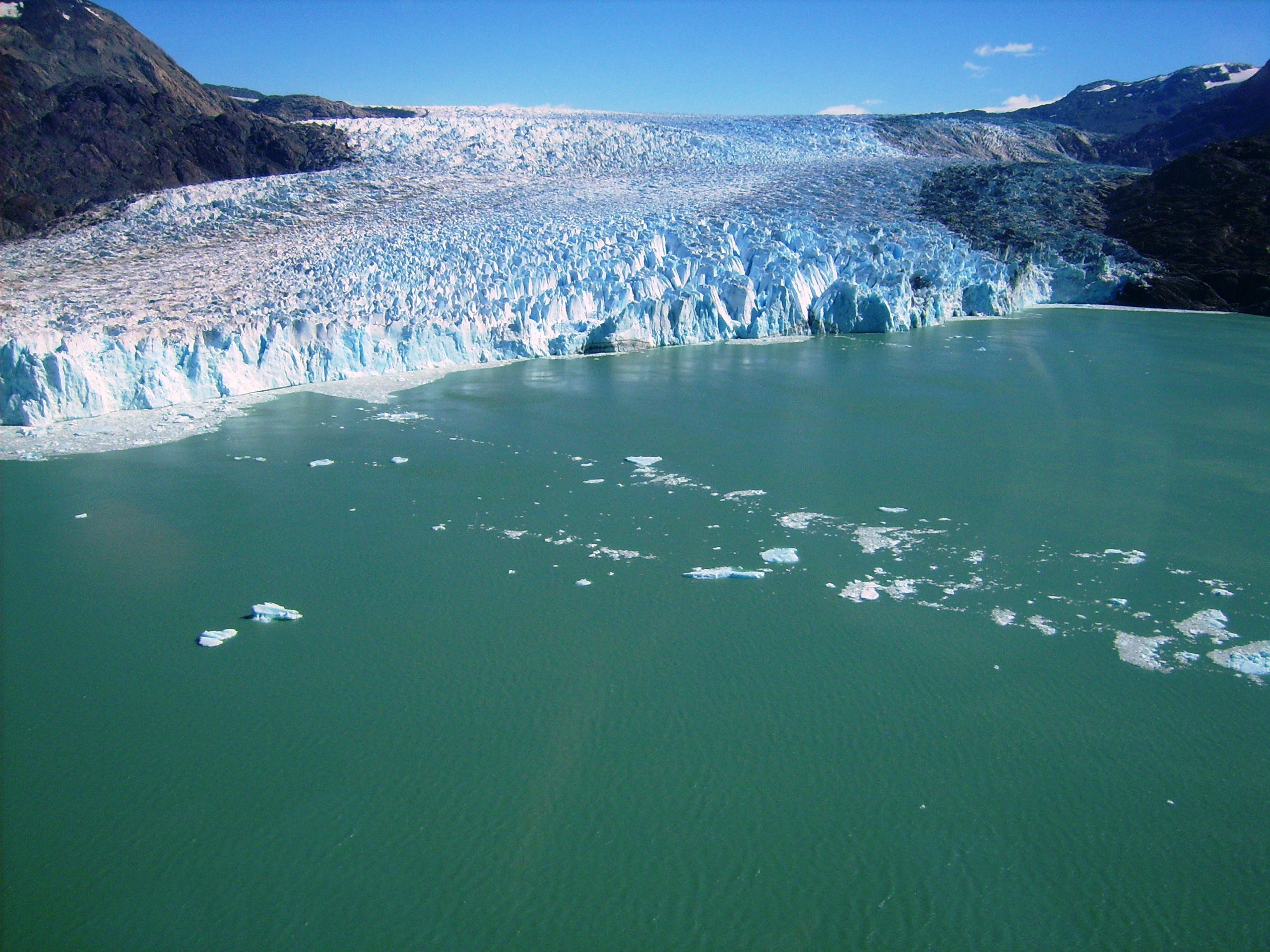
- Interactive map of O'Higgins Glacier
- Location: Chile
- Coordinates: 48°54′S 73°15′W
- Area: 820 km^{2} (320 sq mi)
- Length: 45 km (28 mi)
- Terminus: Glacial lake
- Status: Retreating

O'Higgins Glacier is a glacier in Bernardo O'Higgins National Park, Chile. It is one of the principal glaciers of the Southern Patagonian Ice Field. The summit of the active Lautaro volcano is the top of the accumulation zone of the glacier. The bulk of the glacier is part of the icefield plateau. It flows eastward into O'Higgins Lake and is about 2 km (1.2 mi) wide at the terminus.

== See also ==
- Pío XI Glacier
- List of glaciers
