= Eyre Fjord =

Fjord in Chile

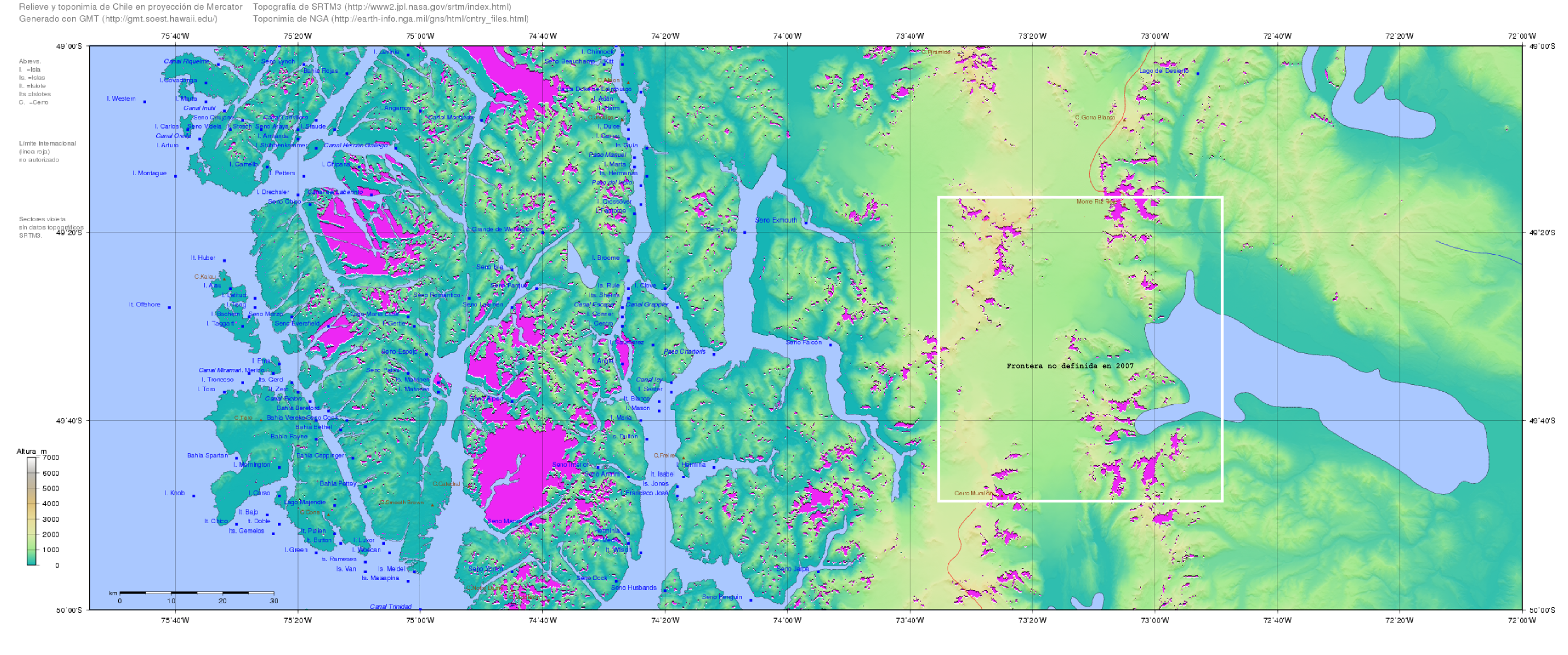
Eyre Fjord, in the middle of the map

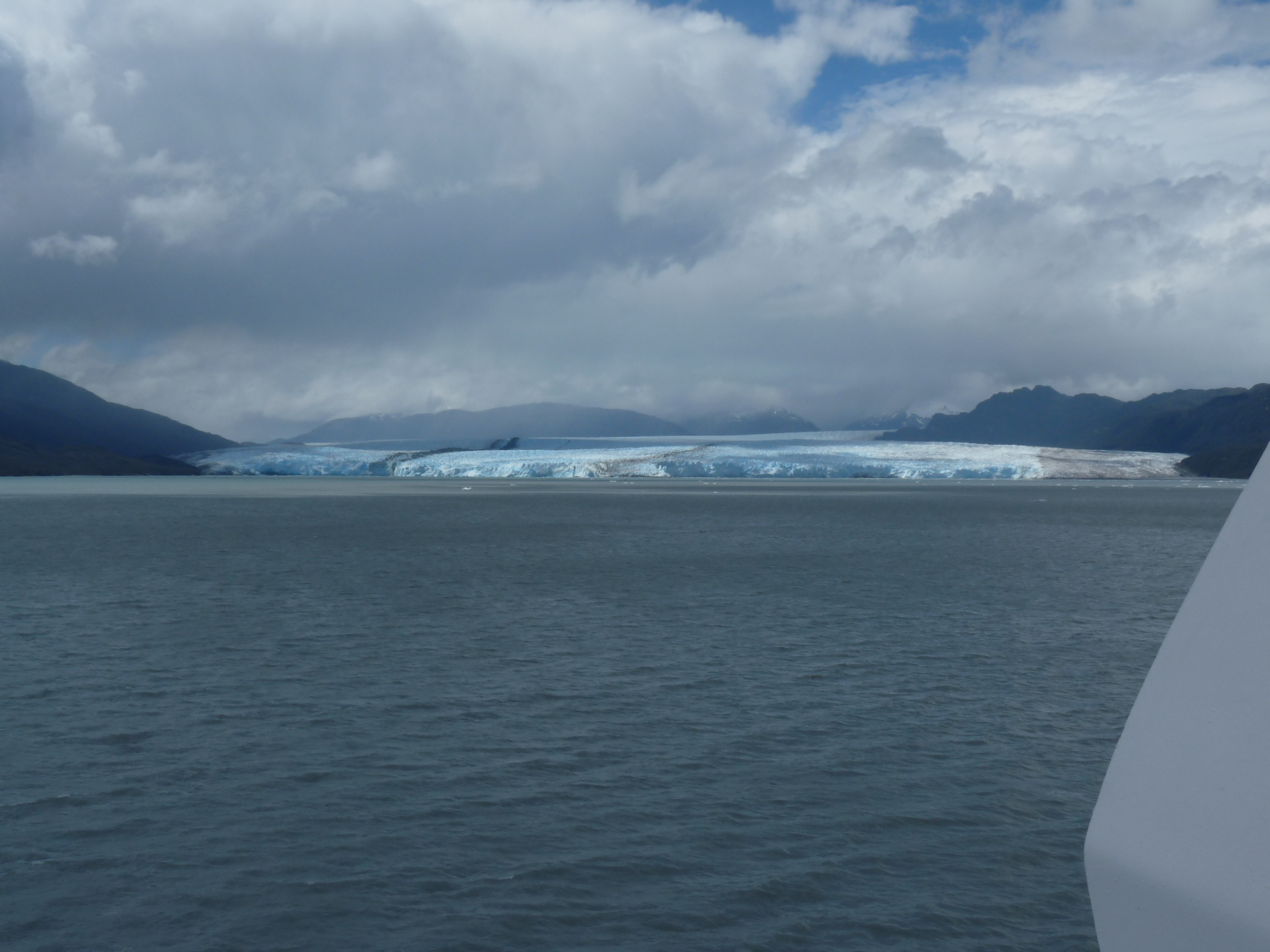
Pío XI glacier.

Eyre Fjord is a fjord in Chile. It extends for 20 miles north from its mouth to its terminus at Pío XI Glacier, and is located at 49°20′S 74°07′W. The fjord has two side fjords on its eastern side called Falcon and Exmouth. The mountains surrounding the fjord reach 1,300 m (4,300 ft).

== See also ==
- Brüggen Glacier
