= Brüggen Glacier =

Glacier in Chile

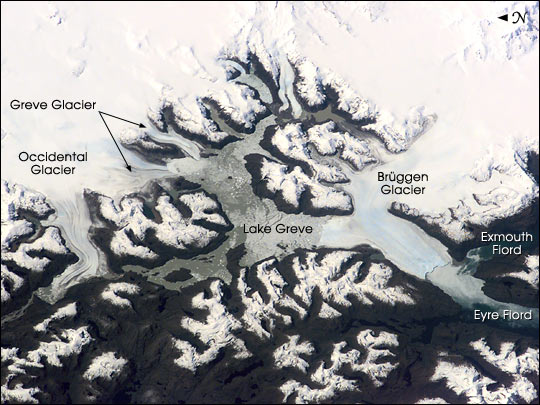
- Brüggen Glacier and surrounding area, September 2001
- Interactive map of Brüggen Glacier
- Type: Tidewater glacier
- Location: Chile
- Coordinates: 49°13′S 74°00′W
- Area: 1,265 km^{2} (488 sq mi)
- Length: 66 km (41 mi)
- Terminus: Sealevel
- Status: Advancing

Brüggen Glacier, also known as Pío XI Glacier named by Spanish explorers after a Pope, is in southern Chile and is the largest western outflow from the Southern Patagonian Ice Field. Now about 66 km (41 mi) in length, it is the longest glacier in the southern hemisphere outside Antarctica. Unlike most glaciers worldwide, it advanced significantly from 1945 to 1976, Brüggen surged 5 km (3.1 mi) across the Eyre Fjord, reaching the western shore by 1962 and cutting off Lake Greve from the sea. The glacier continued advancing both northward and southward in the fjord to near its present position before stabilizing. The growth covers a distance of more than 10 km (6.2 mi) north to south, adding nearly 60 square kilometres (23 sq mi) of ice. The glacier is named after the German geologist Juan Brüggen Messtorff. Expedition cruise ships visit the Pio XI terminus by sailing up the fjord from the sea.

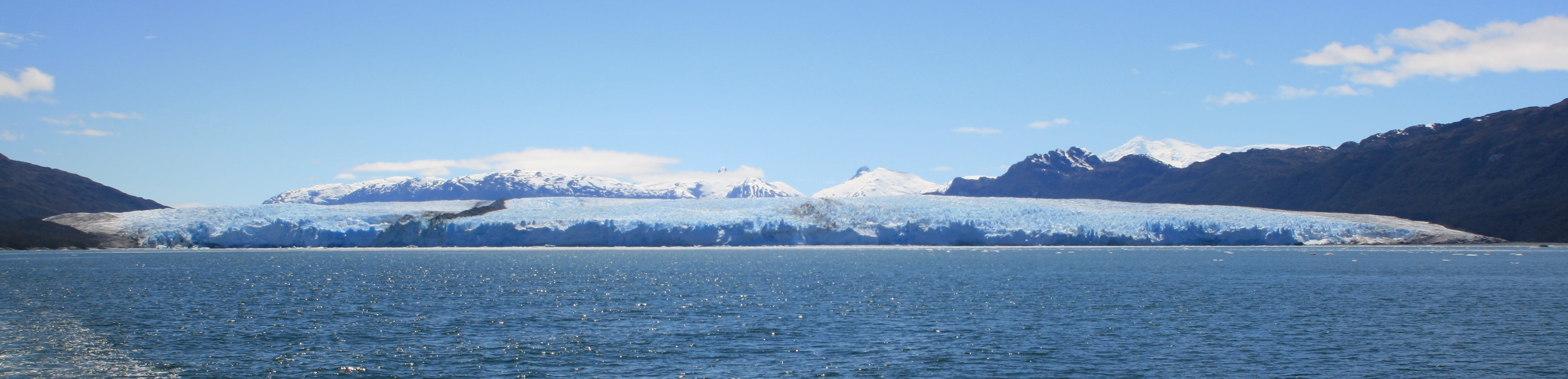
The prominent dark streak at the left quarter is forming a medial moraine

== See also ==
- Bernardo O'Higgins National Park
- Lautaro (volcano)
- List of glaciers
