= Circo de los Altares =

Place in the Southern Patagonian Ice Fields

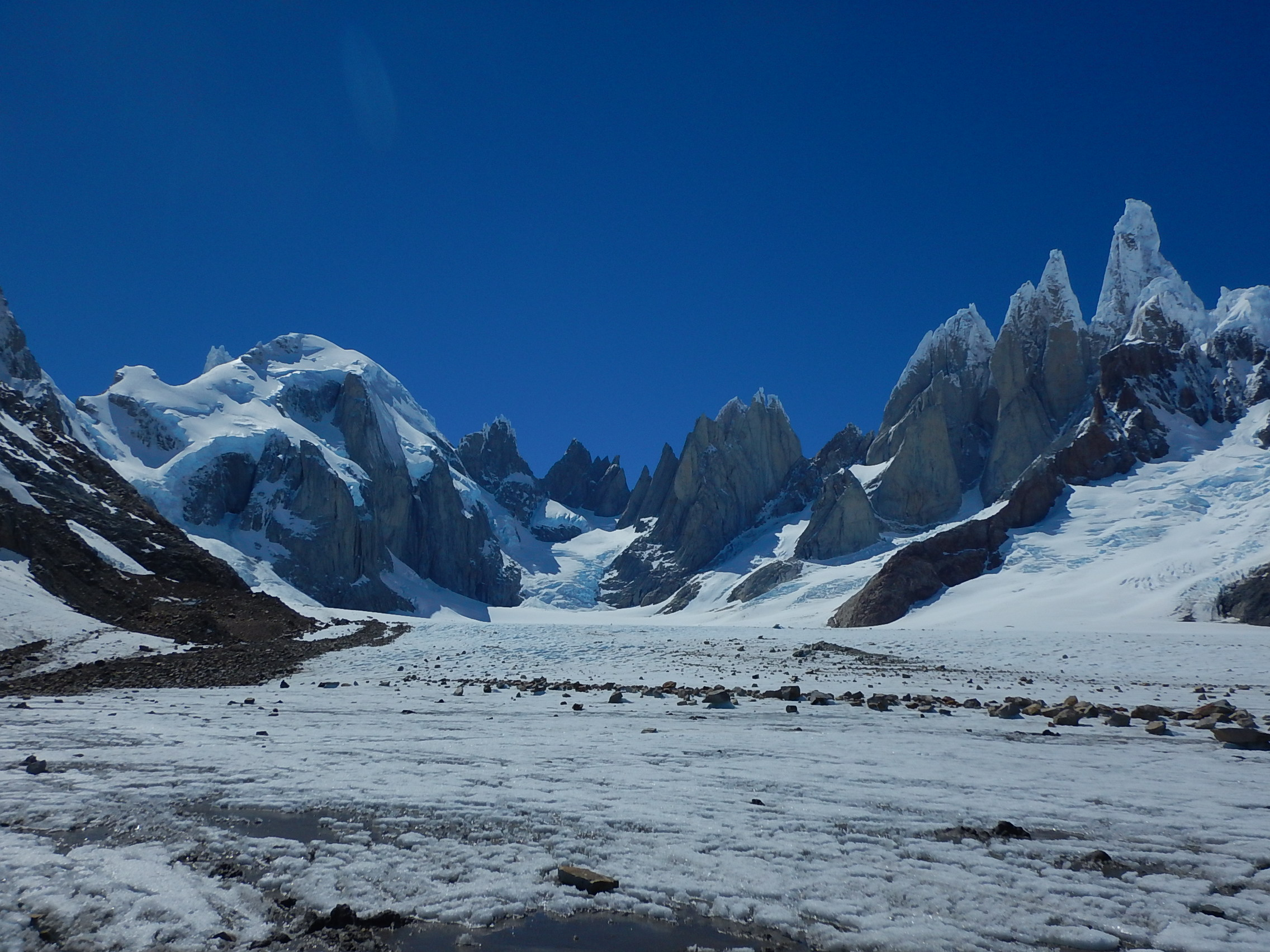
- Circo de los Altares

Geography
- Location within Southern Patagonia
- Location: Location of the Circo de los Altares in Southern Patagonian Ice Field
- Countries: Chile; Argentina (in dispute)
- Region(s): Magallanes y Antártica Chilena Region; Santa Cruz Province (in dispute)

The Circo de los Altares is a cirque glacier of the Patagonian Andes, located in the Southern Patagonian Ice Field, where Cerro Torre and Mount Fitz Roy can be seen from its western sides. It is located within the Area in dispute between Chile and Argentina with the border being defined in the northern area of the site.

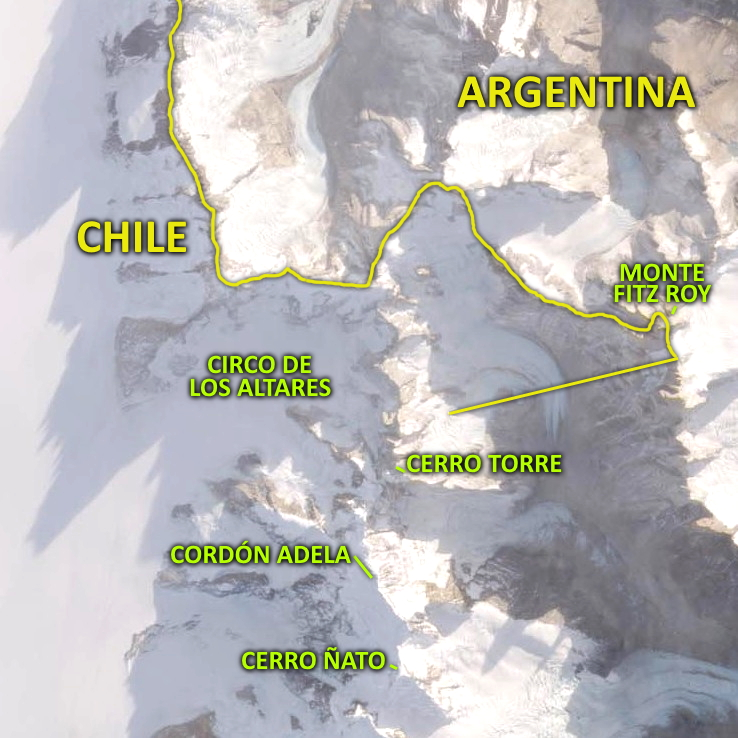
Map of the area with the boundary currently defined by both countries.

It is located within the Bernardo O'Higgins National Park in the Magallanes and Chilean Antarctica Region and in the Argentine part (in dispute) in the Los Glaciares National Park in the Santa Cruz Province.

The tours to the site are made from the Argentine town of El Chaltén, passing through the Paso Marconi until reaching the site. Tours are also offered from the Chilean town of Villa O'Higgins.

To the east of the Torre Mountain Range the Chaltén Mountain Range Natural Site, which is also part of the Bernardo O'Higgins National Park, can be found.

In 2021 there was a controversy since CONAF (from Chile) installed a dome in the place which its southern part is claimed by both countries.

== Mountains ==
The following mountains are part of the scenery:

- Cerro Rincón
- Cerro Domo Blanco
- Mount Fitz Roy
- Cerro Standhardt
- Punta Herón
- Torre Egger
- Cerro Torre
- Cerro Adela Norte

== International Border ==
The Argentine-Chilean boundary in the area was defined with the 1994 arbitration decision regarding the Laguna del Desierto which passes to the north of the Circo de los Altares, establishing it as part of the only Chilean pass to Mount Fitz Roy. The boundary from south of Mount Fitz Roy to an intermediate zone towards the Cerro Torre range to the west was established in section B of the 1998 agreement concerning the Southern Patagonian Ice Field with points A and B having exact coordinates. The same agreement established a zone pending demarcation within which the site is located.

The Argentine cartography prior to the 1998 agreement and currently in use in that country claims the southern part of the Circo de los Altares as Argentine, leaving the northern part in Chile.

On the other hand, Chile's cartography prior to the 1998 agreement claims the entire site, the international boundary being the Adela range up to the part that goes towards the Fitz Roy.

In the minutes of October 1, 1898 the Chilean expert, Diego Barros Arana, and the Argentinian one, Francisco Pascasio Moreno agreed on the definition of the boundary in the area of the southern Patagonian ice field, which was defined on the following mountain landmarks and their natural continuity: Fitz Roy, Torre, Huemul, Campana, Agassiz, Heim, Mayo and Stokes. The Circo de los Altares is located to the west of the line defined by both experts and thus considered Chilean territory according to the line.
