= Bernardo O'Higgins National Park =

National park in the Aysén and Magallanes regions of Chile

- IUCN category II (national park)
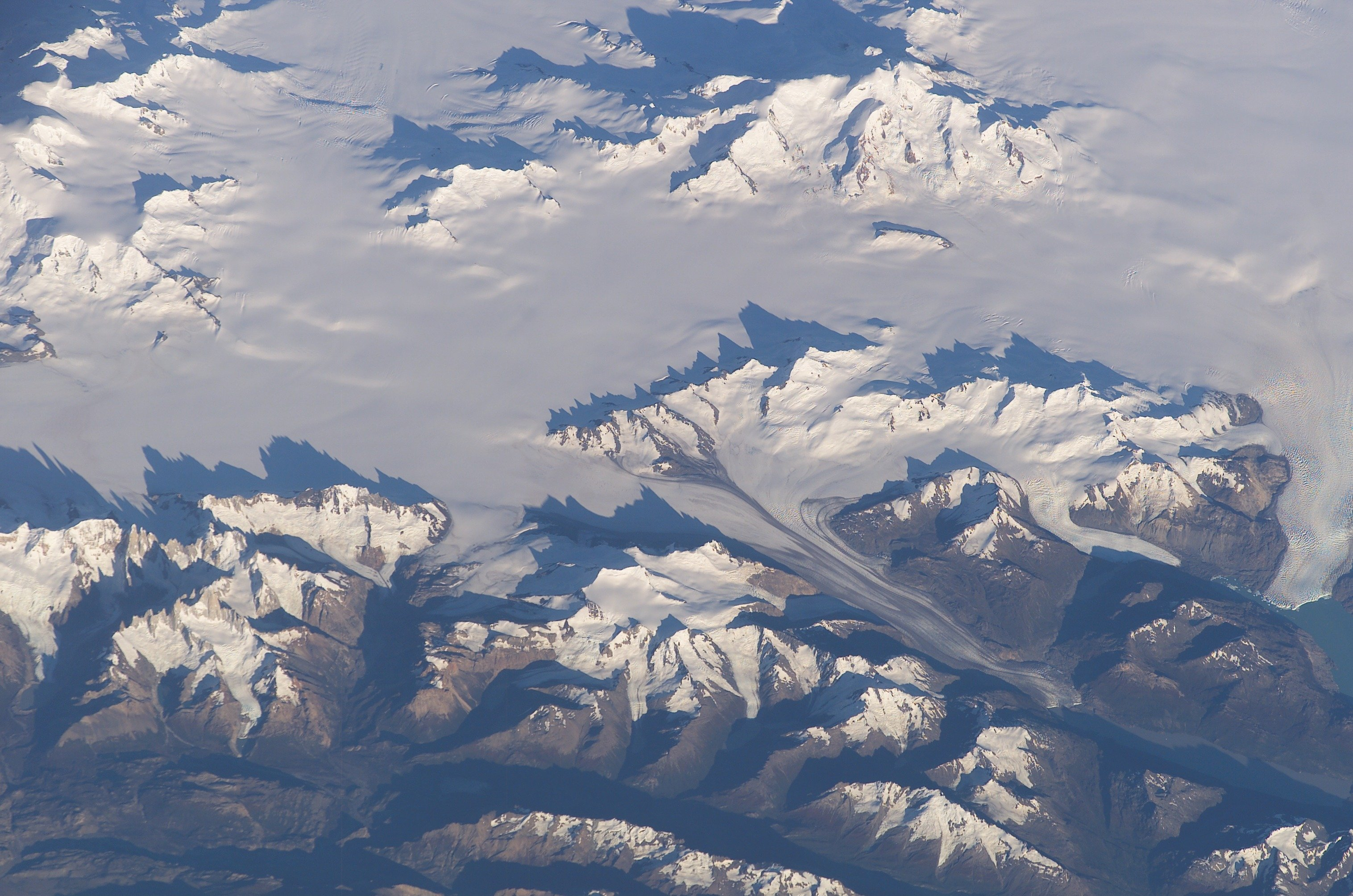
- Southern Patagonian Ice Field

- Location within Chile
- Location: Aysén del General Carlos Ibáñez del Campo Region-Magallanes Region, Chile
- Coordinates: 50°0′S 74°00′W
- Area: 3,525,901 ha (8,712,691 acres)
- Established: July 22, 1969
- Visitors: 35,964 (in 2016)
- Governing body: Corporación Nacional Forestal

Bernardo O'Higgins National Park (Spanish pronunciation: [beɾˈnaɾðo oˈxiɣins]) is the largest of the protected areas in Chile, covering an area of 3,525,901 ha (8,712,691 acres), in both the Aysén and Magallanes and Antártica Chilena regions. Management of this and other national parks in Chile is entrusted to the Corporación Nacional Forestal (CONAF). The park is named after General Bernardo O'Higgins, the first head of state of the Republic of Chile. Los Glaciares National Park (Argentina) and Torres del Paine National Park are its neighbours to the east, Laguna San Rafael National Park is located to the north, the Alacalufes National Reserve to the southwest, and the Katalalixar National Reserve to the northwest.

== History ==
The earliest occupants of the area were the Alacaluf people.

In 1830, the then-Captain Phillip Parker King on board HMS Beagle visited the Eyre Fjord.

In June 2007, it was announced that between March and May 2007 all the water within a glacial lake located within the park had disappeared, leaving behind a 100-foot-deep crater. Only some blocks of ice, previously floating on the lake, remained behind on the crater floor. In July 2007, scientists were able to draw the preliminary conclusion that the disappearance occurred as a result of climate change.

In 2014 the natural sites Chaltén Mountain Range and Pío XI Glacier were created as subdivitions of the natural park.

== Geography ==
The park is located approximately between 48° and 51° 38' South Latitude (between the Baker Channel and the northern part of the Fjord of the Mountains. The east-central area of the park is subject to a territorial dispute between Chile and Argentina. The highest summit is the Lautaro volcano at 3,607 m (11,834 ft). Other summits include the Mount Fitz Roy, the Circo de los Altares, the Cerro Torre and the Cerro Riso Patrón. The elevations are lower in the southern part of the park, but the scenery is still spectacular. The highlight of this zone is Mount Balmaceda at 2,035 m (6,677 ft), beautified by the glaciers Balmaceda and Serrano.

There are no large rivers on the park coast, but the narrow fjords penetrate deeply into the mountains and bring away the drainage of their ice-capped, storm-swept elevations.

== Geology ==
=== Glaciers ===
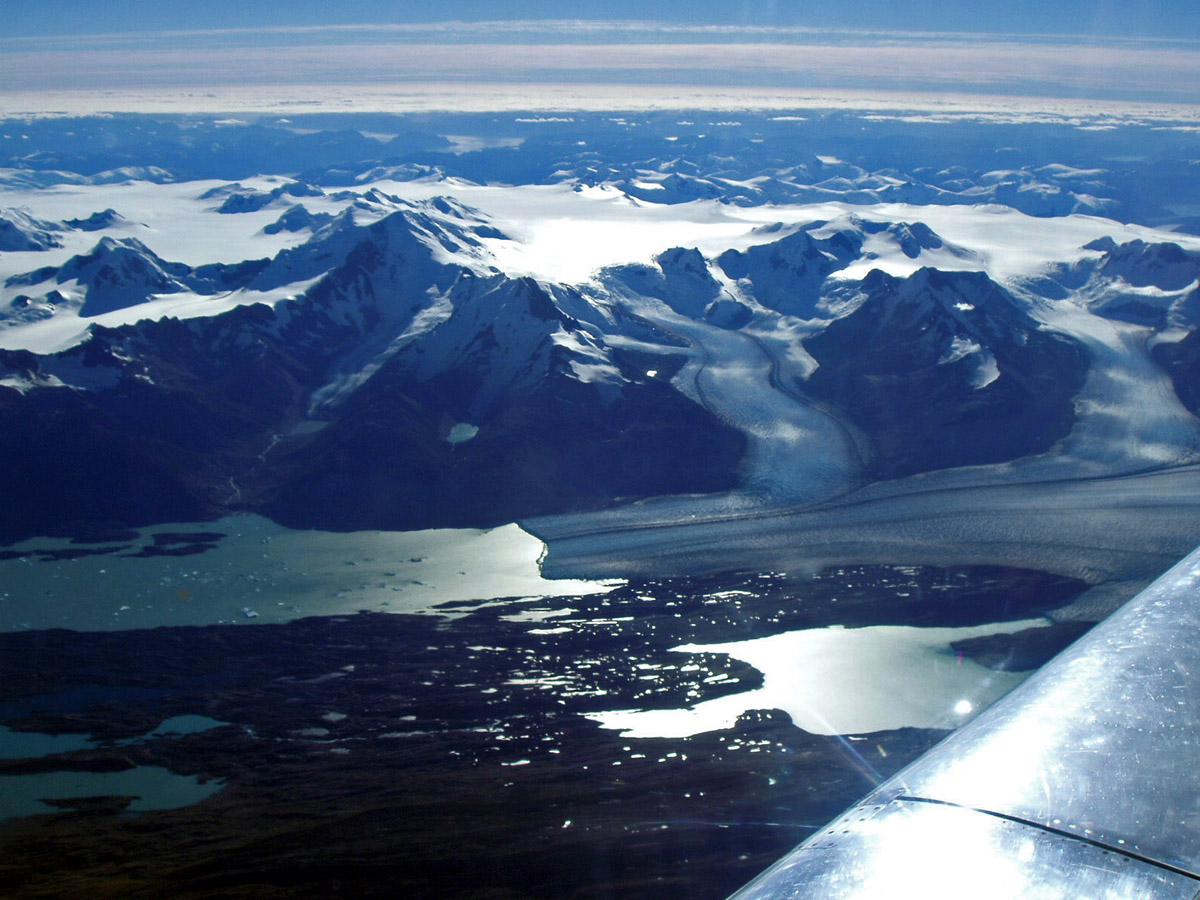
Argentina/Chile border

The park includes a great part of the Southern Patagonian Ice Field. One of its main attractions is the Glacier Pío XI, from which enormous ice blocks periodically spall. The Pío XI glacier is the largest glacier in the southern hemisphere outside of Antarctica, covering an area of 1,265 km^{2} (488 sq mi), and has advanced over the past 50 years by more than 10 km (6 mi); one of its tongues measures approximately 6 km (4 mi). The ice face of the glacier is approximately 75 m (246 ft) in height (about 30 floors of a conventional building) and the falling ice generates waves exceeding 10 m (33 ft) in height; significant enough to rock larger vessels. Other outlet glaciers are Chico, O'Higgins, Jorge Montt, Bernardo, Témpano, Occidental, Greve, Penguin and Amalia.

== Internal natural sites ==
On February 27, 2014, Chile's National Forestry Corporation created the Chaltén Mountain Range Natural Site by Resolution No. 74, which covers the Chilean side of Mount Fitz Roy and the surrounding mountain range. The same decree also created the Pío XI Glacier Natural Site.

Natural sites of Bernardo O'Higgins National Park
Photo	Name	Year	Region(s)	Province(es)	Area (Ha)
	Chaltén Mountain Range Natural Site	2014	Magallanes and Chilean Antarctica	Última Esperanza	768
	Pío XI Glacier Natural Site	2014	Magallanes and Chilean Antarctica	Última Esperanza	

== Biology ==
The area of the park corresponds to the Magellanic subpolar forests ecoregion. The forests are made up of several trees species, including Nothofagus betuloides, Nothofagus pumilio, Nothofagus antarctica and Drimys winteri.

The park is one of the last refuges for the Chilean huemul. In this also can be found species such as Andean condor, marine otter and cormorant.

== Tourism ==
Because of its rugged geography and the remoteness of the area, the tourism in the park has been scarcely developed. It is only accessible by boat or helicopter. The glaciers located at the head of Última Esperanza Sound and the glacier Pío XI are the most visited areas of the park. The main gateways for visitors to the park are Puerto Natales, Villa O'Higgins, Caleta Tortel and Puerto Edén. Sea kayaking is a popular activity in the park.

== See also ==
- Chaltén Mountain Range Natural Site
- Base General Bernardo O'Higgins Riquelme
- Wellington Island
- Zona Austral
- Guayaneco Archipelago
- O'Higgins Lake
