= Southern Patagonian Ice Field =

Ice field in southern Chile and Argentina

- May 2017 NASA satellite photograph of the Southern Patagonian Ice Field

- Location within Southern Patagonia
- Type: Ice field
- Location: Southern Patagonia, Argentina and Chile
- Coordinates: 49°55′S 73°32′W
- Area: 16,800 km^{2} (6,500 mi^{2})
- Status: Retreating

The Southern Patagonian Ice Field (Spanish: Campo de Hielo Patagónico Sur), located at the Southern Patagonic Andes between Chile and Argentina, is the world's second largest contiguous extrapolar ice field. It is the bigger of two remnant parts of the Patagonian Ice Sheet, which covered all of southern Chile during the last glacial period, locally called the Llanquihue glaciation.

== Geography ==
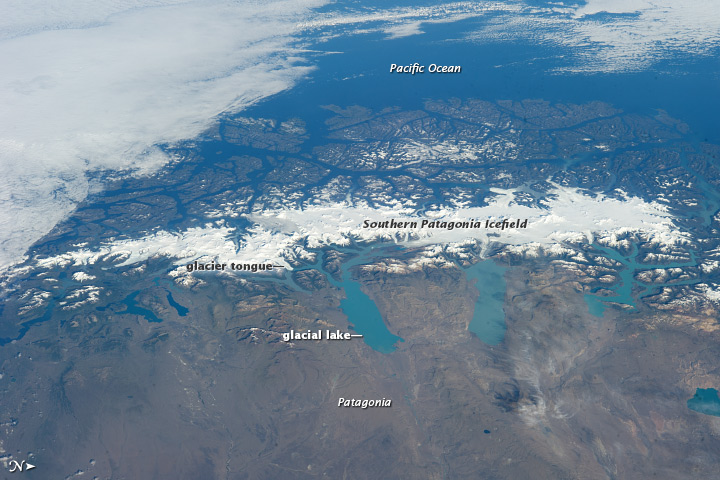
Southern Patagonia Ice Field from ISS, astronaut photo. North is to the right.

The Southern Patagonian Ice Field extends from parallels 48° 15′ S to 51° 30′ S for approximately 350 kilometres (220 mi), and has an approximate area of 16,480 km^{2} (6,360 sq mi), of which 14,200 km^{2} (5,500 sq mi) belong to Chile and 2,600 km^{2} (1,000 sq mi) belong to Argentina. (Note: The area includes regions included in the official cartography of Argentina, which is still pending demarcation, see the section on the dispute.)

The ice mass feeds dozens of glaciers in the area, among which are the Upsala (765 km^{2} or 295 sq mi), Viedma (978 km^{2} or 378 sq mi) and Perito Moreno (258 km^{2} or 100 sq mi) in the Los Glaciares National Park in Argentina, and the Pío XI Glacier or Bruggen Glacier (1,265 km^{2} or 488 sq mi, the largest in area and longest in the Southern Hemisphere outside of Antarctica), O'Higgins (820 km^{2} or 320 sq mi), Grey (270 km^{2} or 100 sq mi) and Tyndall (331 km^{2} or 128 sq mi) in Chile. The glaciers going to the west flow into the fjords of the Patagonian channels of the Pacific Ocean; those going to the East flow into the Patagonian lakes Viedma and Argentino, and eventually, through the rivers de la Leona and Santa Cruz, to the Atlantic Ocean.

An important part of the ice field is protected under different national parks, such as the Bernardo O'Higgins and Torres del Paine in Chile, and the aforementioned Los Glaciares in Argentina.

There are two known volcanoes under the ice field: Lautaro and Viedma. Due to their inaccessibility they are among the least researched volcanoes in Chile and Argentina.

In 1980, Chile planned Route 8 as a section of the Carretera Austral west of the ice field, which has not been built.

Circo de los Altares is an important hiking place.

== History ==
=== Exploration ===
Thorough explorations include the expeditions of Federico Reichert (1913–1914), Alberto de Agostini (1931), and Harold William Tilman and Jorge Quinteros (1955–1956), as well as Eric Shipton (1960–61). The first (North-South) crossing of the field was accomplished in 1998 by Pablo Besser, Mauricio Rojas, José Montt, and Rodrigo Fica. Nevertheless, some areas of the field remain largely unexplored.

From the air, initial exploration was conducted in 1928–29 by Gunther Plüschow after whom a glacier is named. From April 1944 to April 1945, the United States Army Air Forces conducted an aerial survey using the Trimetrogon method at the request of the Chilean government.

=== Borderline ===
This map shows the current border, the B Section is pending to be defined.

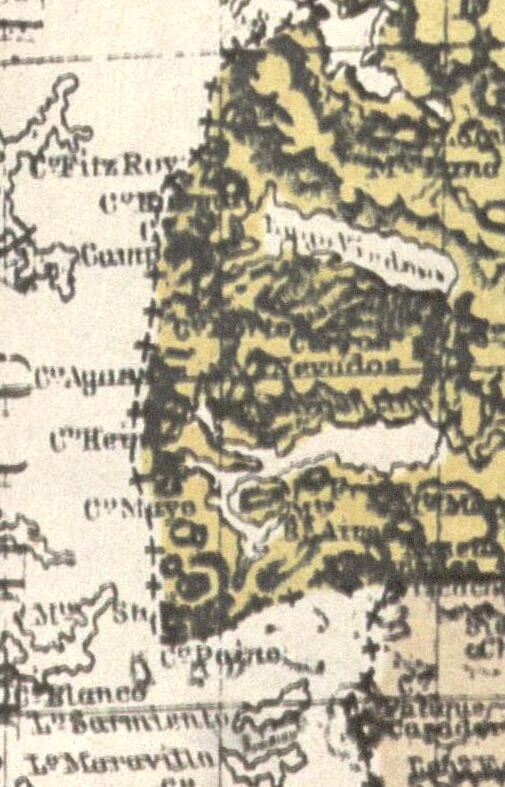
Argentine map of 1912 showing historical boundary markers agreed upon by the Argentine and Chilean experts, Fitz Roy, Torre, Huemul, Campana, Agassiz, Heim, Mayo, and Stokes/Cervantes.

The boundary between Argentina and Chile in the area was established by the 1881 treaty and delimited in 1898 by the experts of both countries working in the demarcation of the border, and which differences led to the 1902 award, in which they agreed they did not have differences on the part of the border between Fitz Roy and Stokes. The award is established "to perpetuity" by both countries under British tutelage. The map published by the British Crown, as part of the documentation of the 1902 award, illustrates a clear demarcation line (from the Fitz Roy to the Stokes) to the east of the Southern Patagonian Ice Fields, leaving most of the territory in question in the Chilean side.

The 1902 award considered that in that area the high peaks are water dividing and therefore there was no dispute. Both experts, Francisco Pascasio Moreno from Argentina and Diego Barros Arana from Chile, agreed on the border between Mount Fitz Roy and Stokes (nowadays Cervantes). Since 1898, the demarcation of the border in the ice field, between the two mountains, was defined on the next mountains and their natural continuity: Fitz Roy, Torre, Huemul, Campana, Agassiz, Heim, Mayo, and Stokes/Cervantes. In 1914, the Mariano Moreno range was visited by an expedition; however, Francisco Pascasio Moreno already knew of its existence. Argentina started to question the border, arguing that the border should be in the Mariano Moreno range.

In 1994, the Laguna del Desierto dispute was solved which involved territory of the Ice Field; an international tribunal awarded almost the whole zone to Argentina. After a refused appeal in 1995, Chile accepted the award. Since then, Chile has had a small corridor to access Mount Fitz Roy, and the Marconi Pass was defined as an international border crossing point.

The Southern Patagonian Ice Field section of the border is the last remaining land border issue between Chile and Argentina. On August 1, 1991, the governments of Chile and Argentina agreed on a borderline, but the agreement was never ratified by the Argentine legislature. Later, in 1998, both governments agreed to redraw the borderline between Mount Fitz Roy and Daudet.

Section A of the agreement (between Cerro Murallón and Daudet) and a small part of B (from Fitz Roy to a point defined to the west) was drawn; however, they also agreed that section B (from Fitz Roy to Murallón) would wait until completion of a detailed 1:50,000 scale map of the area with further negotiations. To date, this one section remains the final non-concluded boundary section and has been an irritant in Argentina-Chile relations.

==== Controversies after the 1998 agreement ====
In February 2006, Ricardo Lagos appeared in a photo with the head of the Air Force, General Osvaldo Sarabia, in the undemarcated area; this caused controversy with Argentina.

In 2006, the Argentine Instituto Geográfico Militar (IGM) (today Instituto Geográfico Nacional) edited a map without a note about the undefined border but showed the Argentine claims as the official borderline. After Chilean diplomatic protests, the Argentine government withdrew the map and urged Chile to expedite the demarcation of the international border according to the 1998 agreement. On August 24, 2006, the Argentine Undersecretary of Tourism stated that the maps used by the Secretariat of Tourism's website were official because they were approved by the National Geographic Institute of Argentina.

In 2006, president of Chile Michelle Bachelet and president of Argentina Néstor Kirchner held a meeting over the cartographic controversy. Kirchner served as the governor of the Santa Cruz Province from 1991 to 2003.

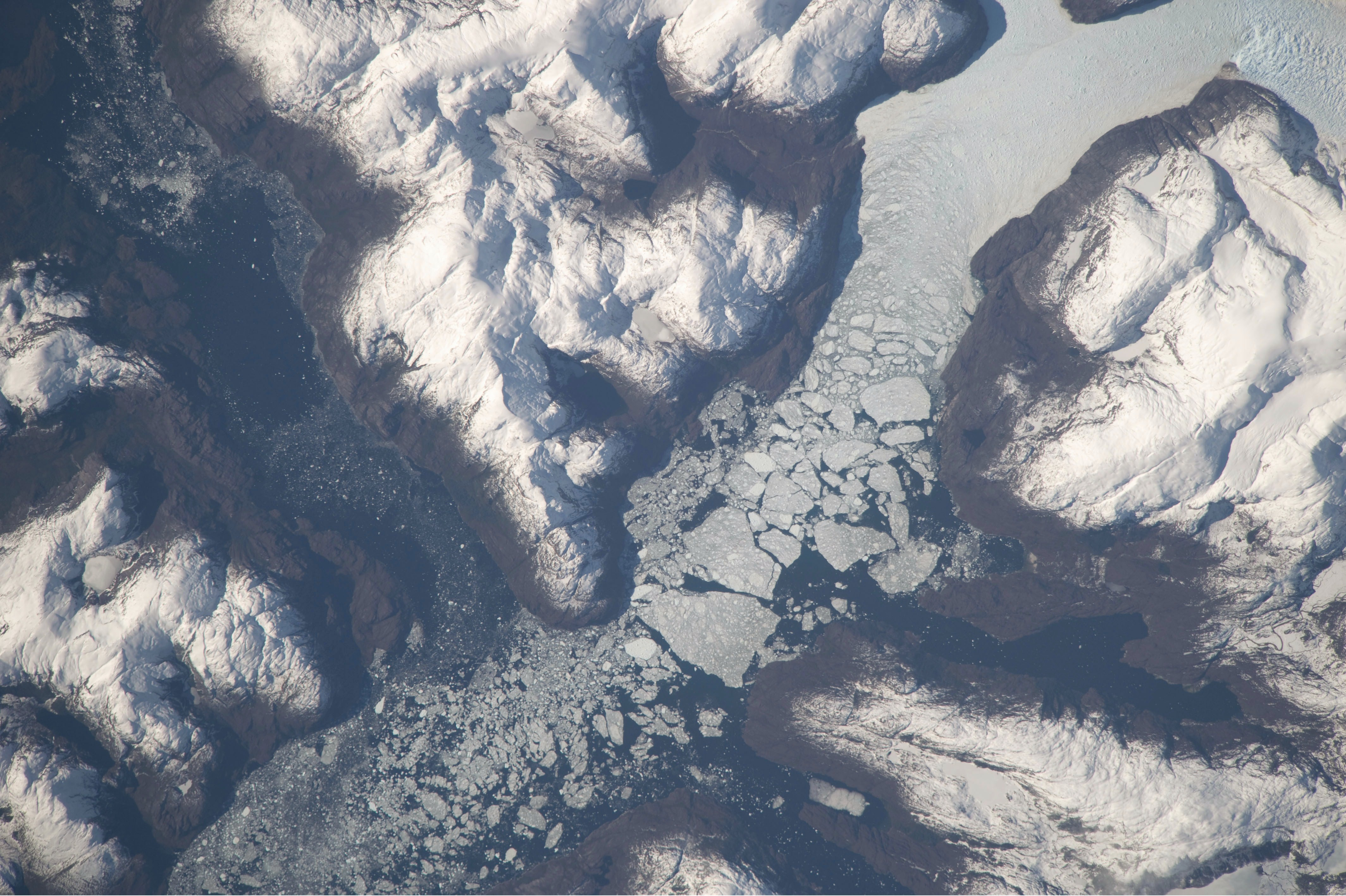
The merged outlet of Penguin Glacier and HPS 19.

In the maps published in Argentina, until today, the region continues to be shown without the white rectangle, as can be seen in a map of Santa Cruz on a website of an official Argentine agency. While in the official Chilean maps and most tourist maps, the rectangle is shown and it is clarified that the boundary is not demarcated according to the 1998 treaty.

In 2018, Argentina made a National Ice Inventory in which are included some disputed glaciers. From September 20 to October 4 of the same year, the Argentine army traveled into the area that is pending to be demarcated. This caused controversy mainly in Chile where the mayor of Villa O'Higgins denounced the fact as a "provocation" and made a call to the central government of Chile to reinforce the sovereignty in the zone.

After the Argentine government published its inventory of glaciers including undefined territory, the Chilean Foreign Ministry informed that a claim note had already been sent denying the Argentine inventory.

In 2021, there was a controversy since CONAF (from Chile) installed a dome in the Circo de los Altares, whose southern part is claimed by both countries.

As of 2026, the demarcation is still pending.

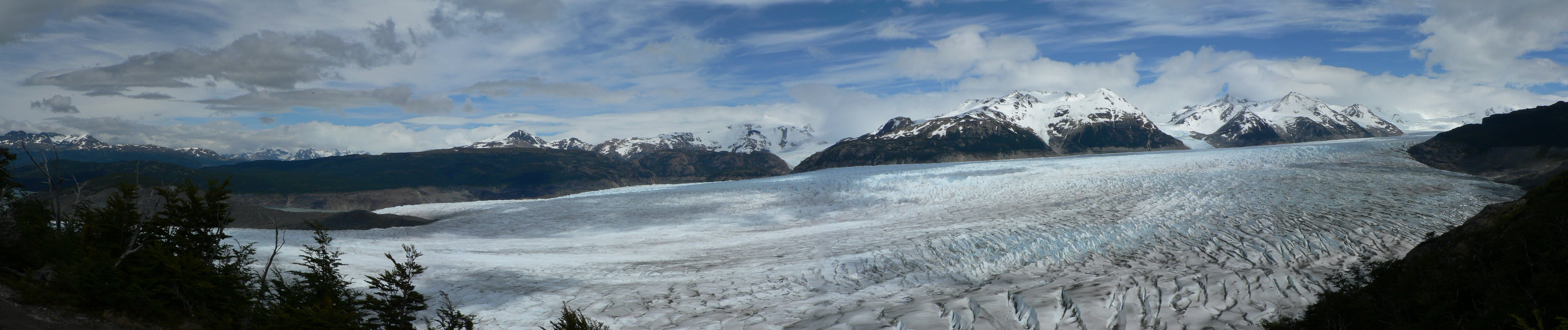
Panoramic view of Grey Glacier in Torres del Paine National Park (Chilean territory)

== Recent retreat ==
Patterns of glacial changes are complex and heterogenous in the temperate Southern Patagonian Ice Field, with some glaciers like the Pio XI Glacier experiencing growth, while others like the Viedma Glacier experience significant ablation. The majority of glaciers in the region, though, are melting and rapidly losing mass with the warming global climate. This region is already known for its rapid turnover rate, boasting the highest flow rates and highest precipitation rates in the world. Rain and snowfall across the ice field, on average, ranges from two to eleven meters per year from the southern Pacific Ocean. The region has simultaneously seen a warming trend that follows global atmospheric temperature increases. As a result of this dense moisture content and warmer air, the region has had record rates of thinning and retreat. Such rates have exacerbated in recent decades, reaching some of the highest across the globe.

From 1968-2000, data from the Shuttle Radar Topography Mission depict an average loss of 13.5 cubic kilometers of ice each year across the entire field, with the last five years of the study (1995-2000) reaching an average of 38.7 cubic kilometers lost per year. Using data elevation models to derive ice height and volume changes, observations indicated an approximate ice-mass loss rate of -20.0 ± 1.2 gigatonnes per year (Gt a^{−1}) from 2000 to 2012 for the region. In the future, the surface mass balance of the Southern Patagonian Ice Field is estimated to shrink between 1.1 meters of water equivalent (m w.e.) and 1.5 m w.e., based on emission scenarios RCP2.6 and RCP8.5, respectively.

== Impact of retreat ==
Glaciers do not exist in isolation but are part of complex natural ecosystems made up of diverse biomes, rock materials, insects, vegetation, and wildlife. Downstream and mountainous human communities also rely on the glaciers and their ecosystems for services including water provision, sediment and nutrient inputs, climatic regulation, and culture and recreation. Therefore, as glaciers retreat, there are ecological, sociological, and cultural consequences.

=== Ecological implications ===
The Southern Patagonia Ice Field supports some of the largest rivers and lakes on the continent including the Río Santa Cruz, Río Pascua, Lago General Carrera/Buenos Aires, Lago Argentino, and Lago Viedma. It also has archipelagos, fjords, and inland waters and multiple types of ecosystems.

The retreat of Southern Patagonian glaciers has caused significant geological instability as the ice retaining moraine material disappears, leading to rock avalanches, landslides, and cracks in valley walls. Such instability also impacts forest and plant vegetation community formations.

As glaciers move, the intense, warm precipitation of the region create ideal conditions for fjords that support large tree covers and lush vegetation. The dense greenery in the Jorge Mott glacier is an example of this. If the glacier retreats faster than vegetation can grow, however, the land will be deserted and left with cracks. Less dense areas of vegetation mean fewer terrestrial ecosystems for diverse flora and fauna and wildlife such as guanacos, pumas, “dragon of Patagonia” stonefly (Andiperla willinki), and the Ruddy-headed goose.

Runoff from glacial melt also changes the chemical make-up of fjord systems by increasing freshwater input. Such impacts could have positive impacts on ecosystems, such as an increased supply of nutrients and phytoplankton growth, or negative impacts like low transparency/salinity.

=== Socio-cultural implications ===
According to the Chilean Water Atlas, the Southern Patagonian Ice Field contributes the highest percentage to the country’s total water resources. These water resources contribute toward drinking water, hydropower, agriculture, and food security.

Glaciers also hold deep cultural and cosmological significance for societies. This is particularly true for Indigenous communities who consider glaciers to be “sacred beings” part of their “ancestral territory.” Close, reciprocal relationships are cultivated and maintained between Indigenous communities and glaciers through ceremonies, pilgrimages, stories, daily practices, and artistry.

Two prominent examples of the socio-cultural implications of the retreat of glaciers in the Southern Patagonia Ice Field include the Cerro El Plomo’s glaciers and Pichillancahue Glacier.

==== Cerro El Plomo's glaciers ====
Cerro El Plomo and its glaciers (Los Castaños, Esmeralda, and Cerro El Plomo) are culturally significant for the Maipo River Valley Indigenous, mestizo, and non-Indigenous peoples. The most represented indigenous groups of the region are the Mapuche, Aymara, and Quechua peoples. For these communities, the Cerro El Plomo and its glaciers are an apu, or “sacred guardian.” Apu facilitate sacred connections and interactions between the earthly and spirit worlds. They also are part of the social identity, history, and everyday life of Chile, as depicted in arpilleras, or handmade Chilean folk tapestries, and the work of arrieros, or herders skilled in ancestral knowledge of the mountains and glaciers.

From 2000 to 2025, however, Cerro El Plomo glaciers lost 1.40 ± 0.51 km^{2} of glacial mass, following a similar trend to other glaciated regions. Indigenous communities have since been forced to remake their practices and livelihoods as these glaciers retreat, but have also been vocal about the impact on their communities.

Cecilia Vicuña’s 2006 artistic piece Quipu menstrual (la sangre de los glaciares) [English: "Menstrual Quipu (The Blood of Glaciers)”] depicts the connection between Indigenous communities and the Cerro El Plomo glaciers using the pre-Columbian Incan practice of knot writing called quipu. Menstruation and fertility (as evoked in the strips of wood in various shades of red) represent the role of glacial water in the cycle of nature and human bodies. The art piece honors the sacredness of the Cerro El Plomo glaciers, while protesting the impacts of glacial loss, due to mining and climate change, to local communities.

==== Pichillancahue Glacier ====
The Pichillancahue Glacier located in the Villarrica National Park in Chile has sacred significance to the Mapuche people. In Mapuzüngun, the language of Mapuche people, the glacier is called kurako-piren, made up of the words kurako (rock water) and piren (snow); the Villarrica Volcano, of which the glaciers forms on and their ancestors lay, is called the Rukapillan (“great spirit’s house”); and the greater territory is the Püchi Llangkawe. Everyday indigenous practices and rituals include seeking permission and expressing gratitude to Püchi Llangkawe before stepping onto the ice.

Such history and tradition are not incorporated into glacier monitoring observations of the Pichillancahue Glacier nor government plans for the area, which include highway construction, mining, hydroelectric damming, and ecotourism development. There are also ongoing legal disputes over Mapuche territorial rights. In response, communities and grassroots have mobilized to protect glaciers and influence political debate.

The complex, localized implications of retreating glaciers suggest a need for more collaborative work between glaciologists, anthropologists, and local (especially Indigenous) communities.

== Gallery ==
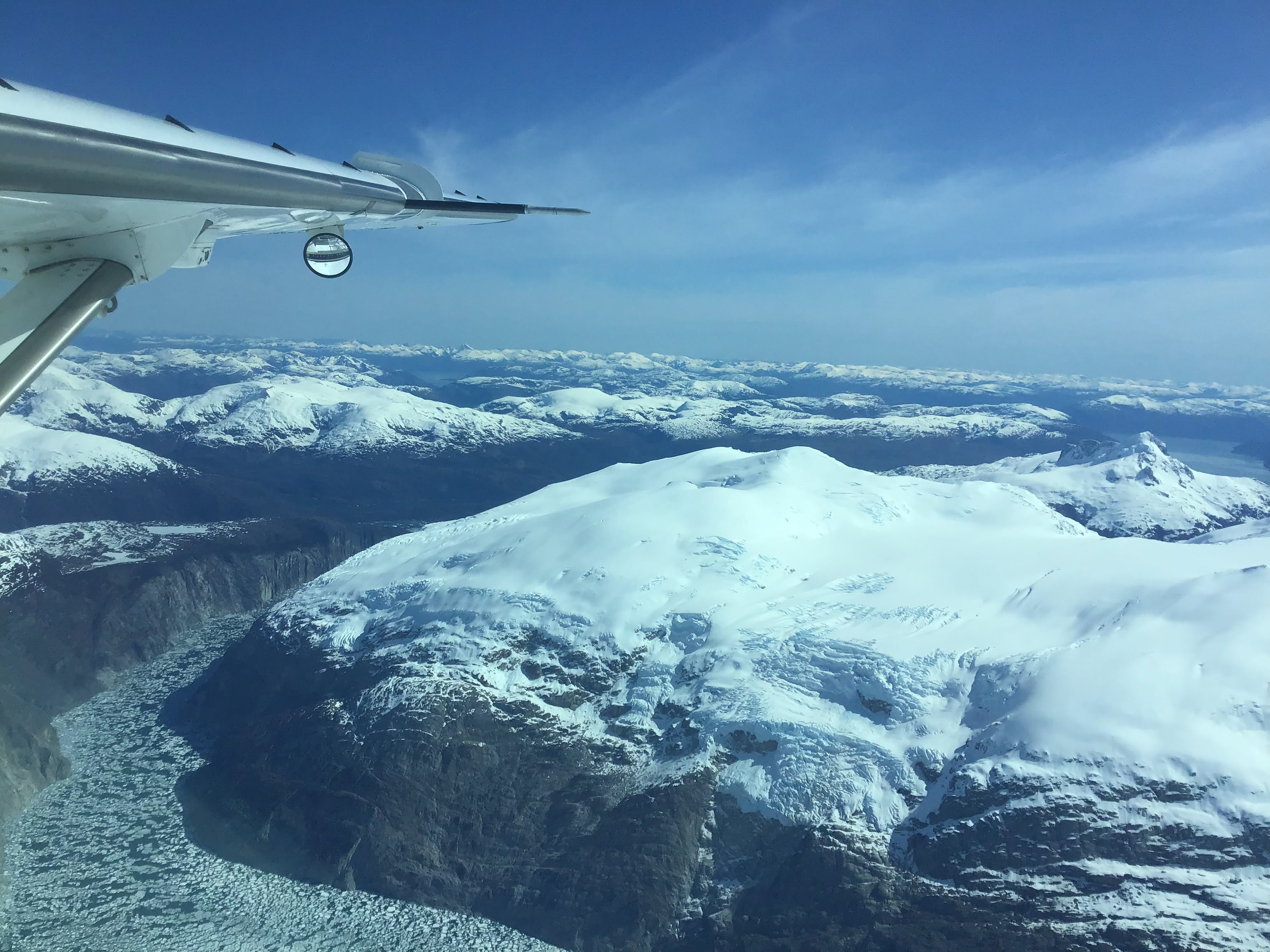
Fjord in Chile

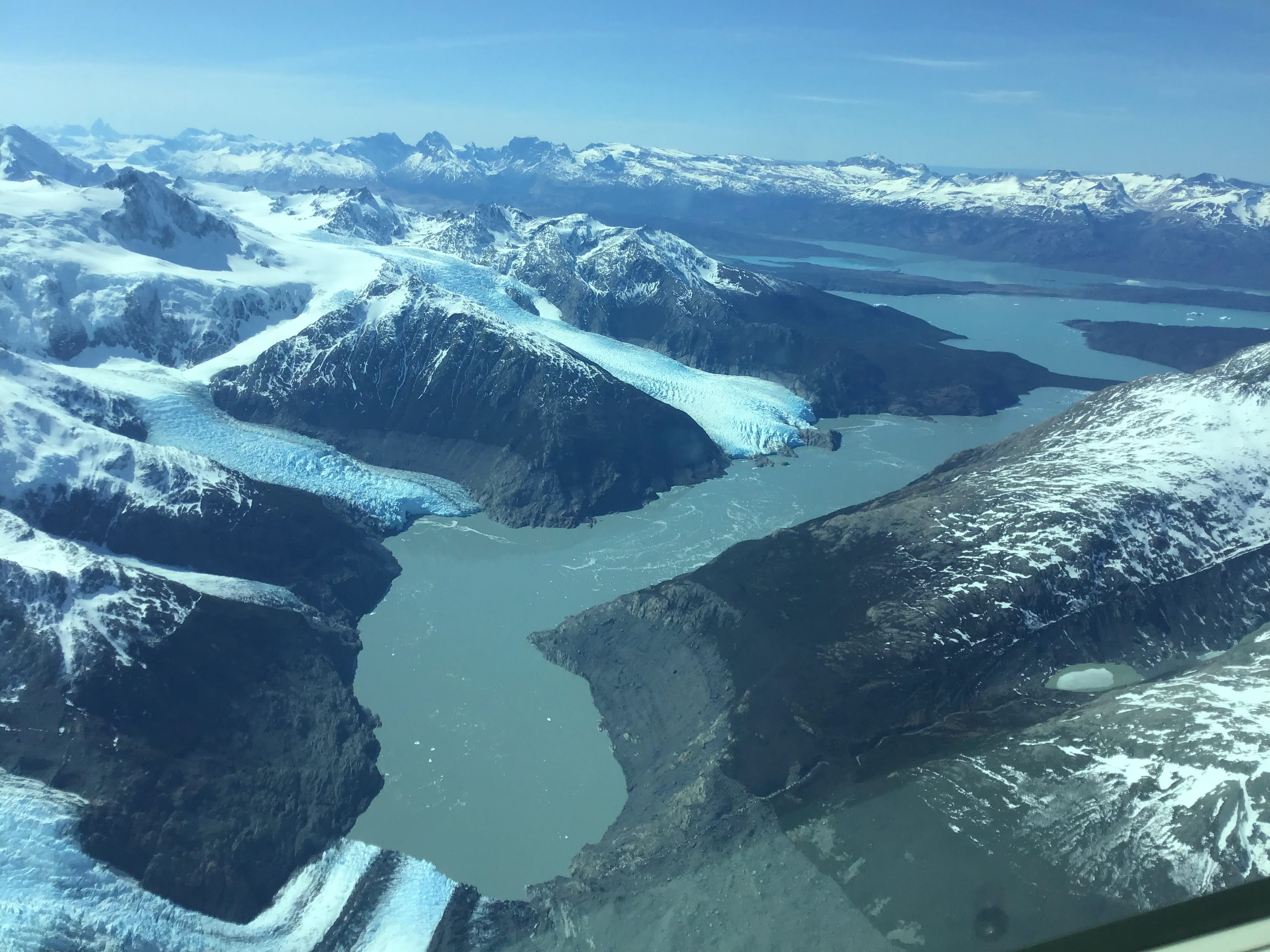
Lake and Glacier Onelli, Santa Cruz, Argentina

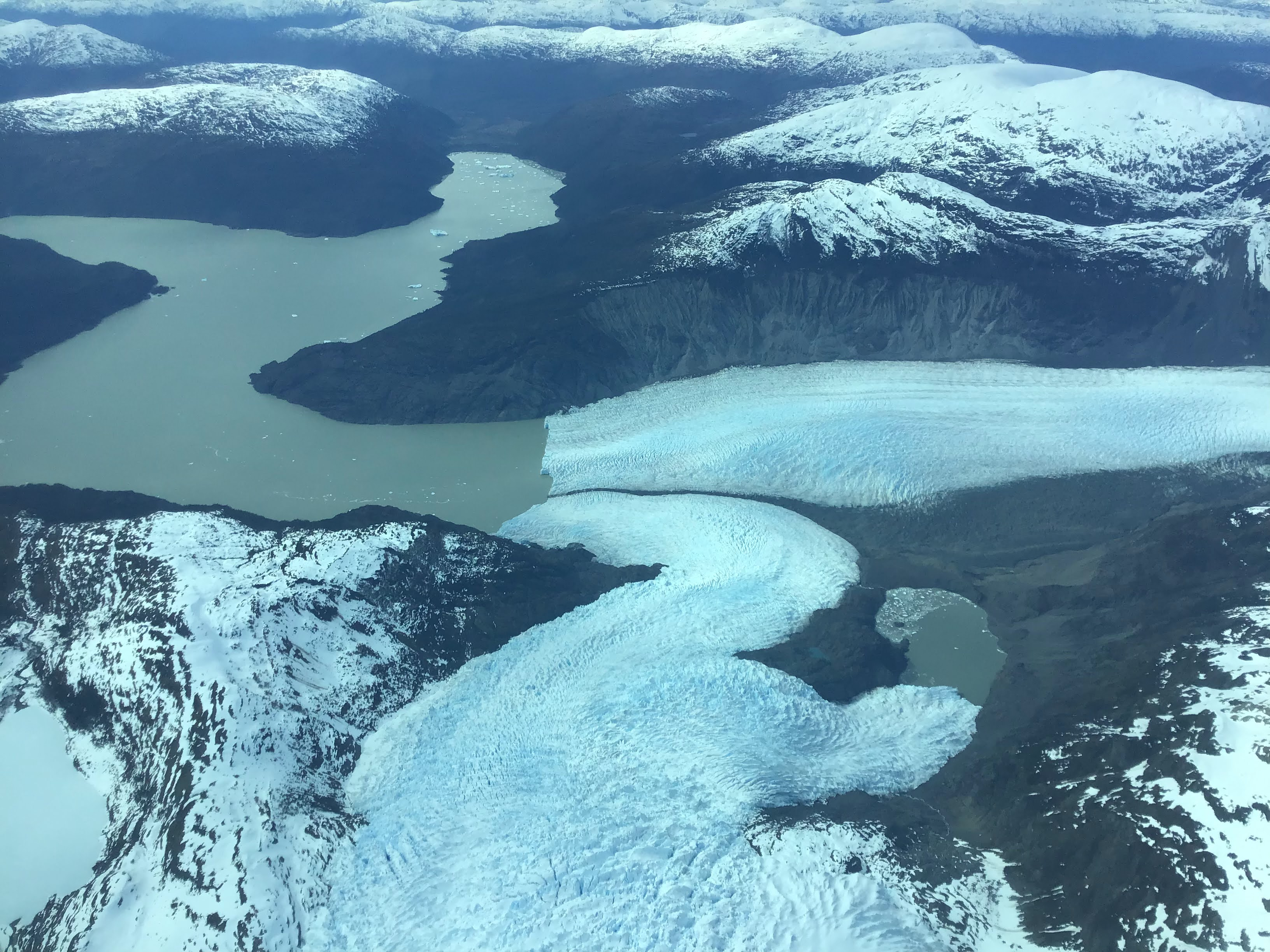
Lake Bergues, Aysén, Chile

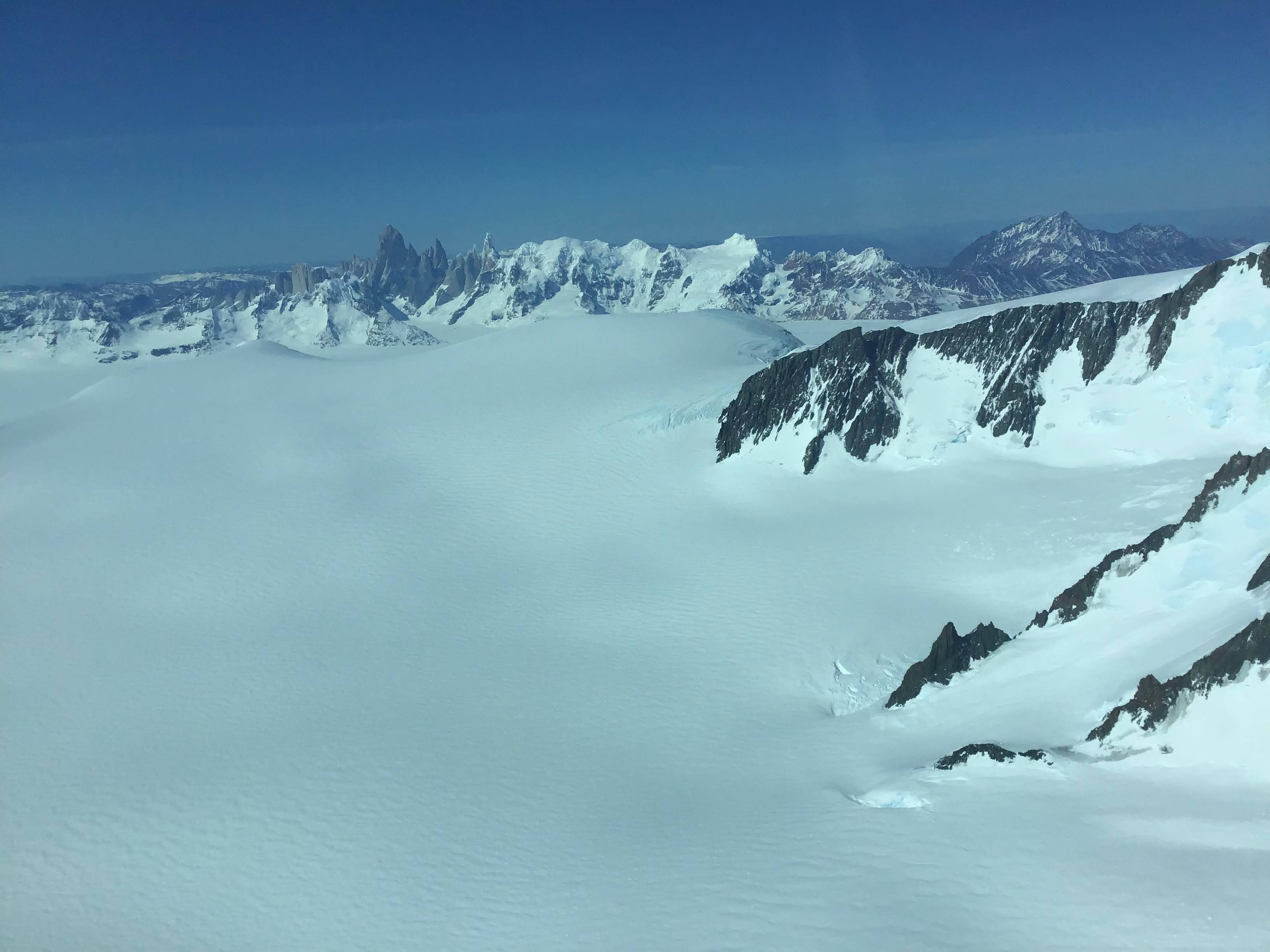
Southern Patagonian Ice Field

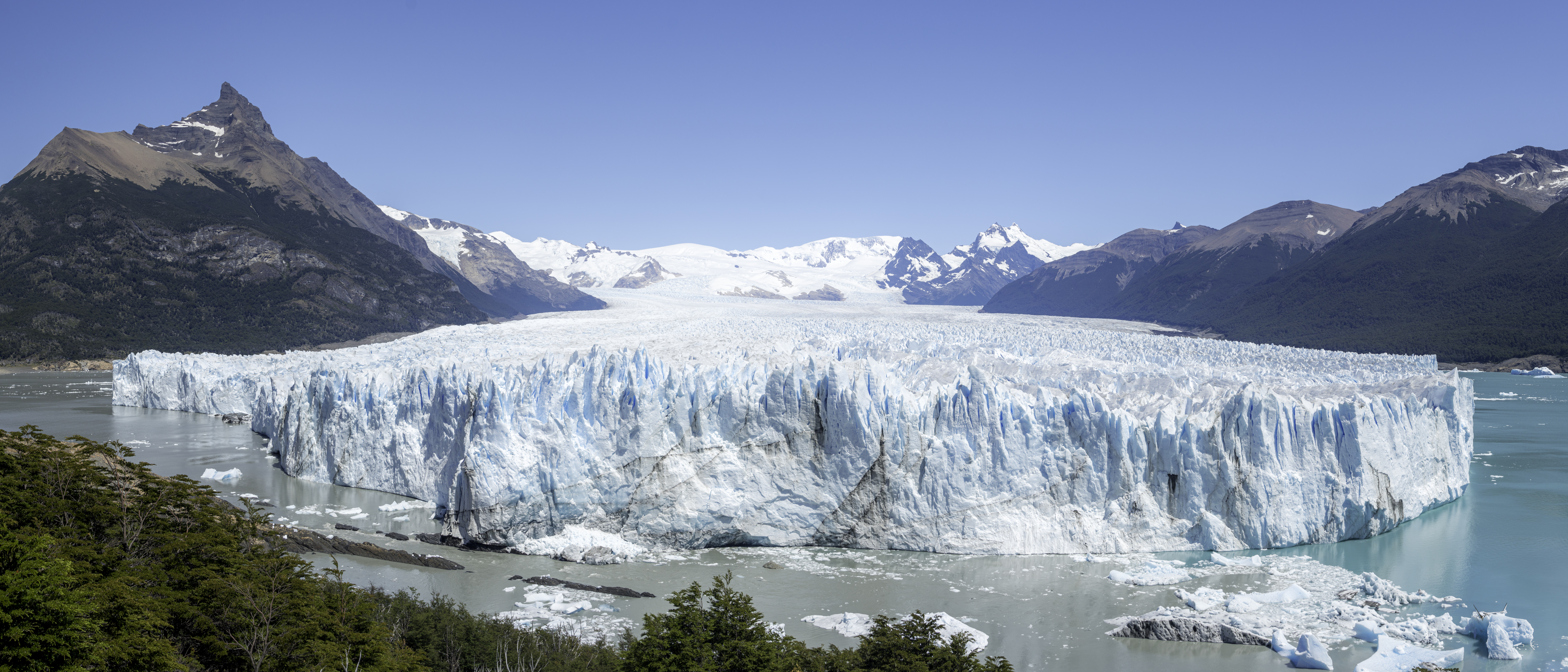
Perito Moreno Glacier, Santa Cruz, Argentina

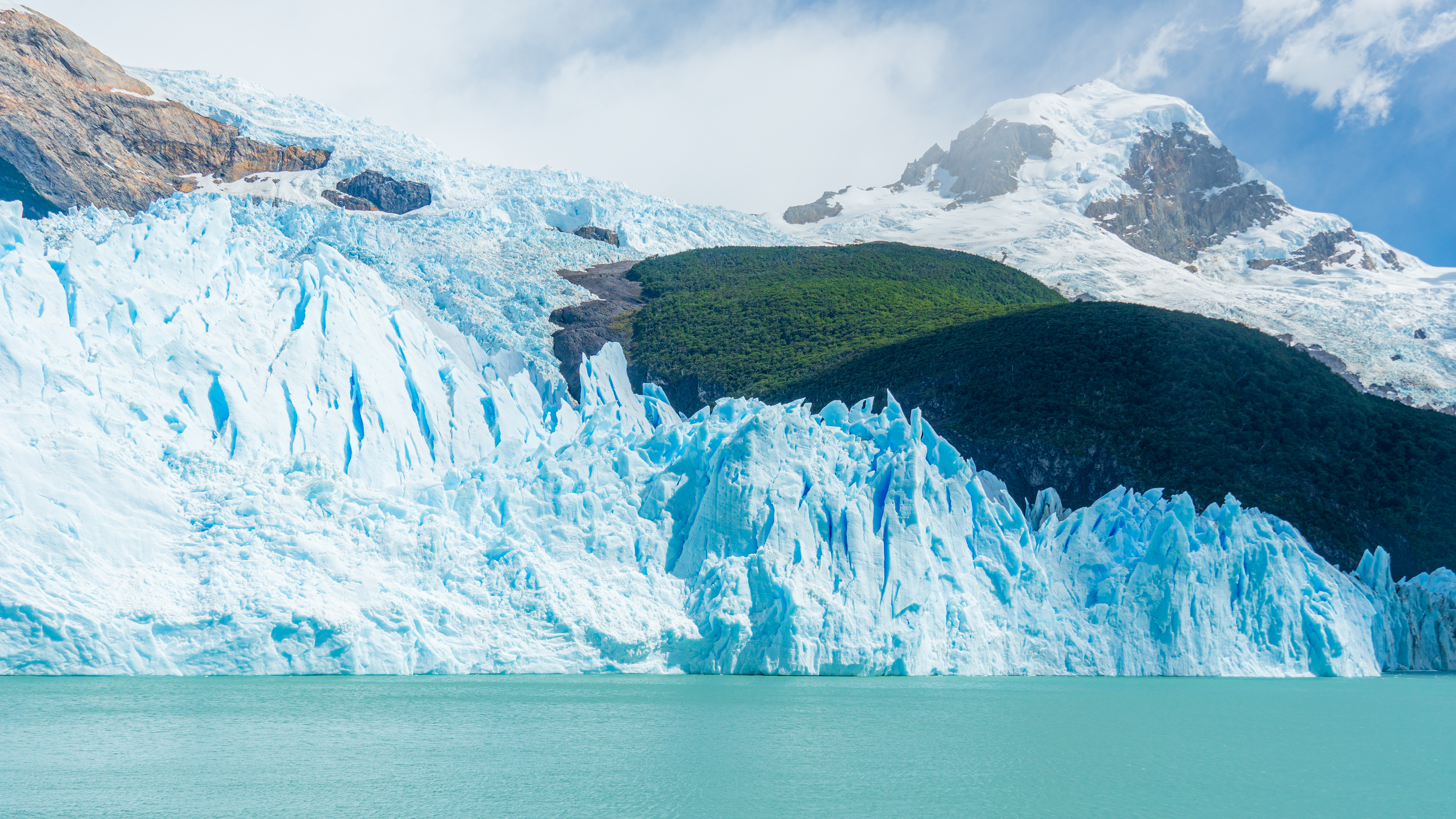
Spegazzini Glacier, Argentina

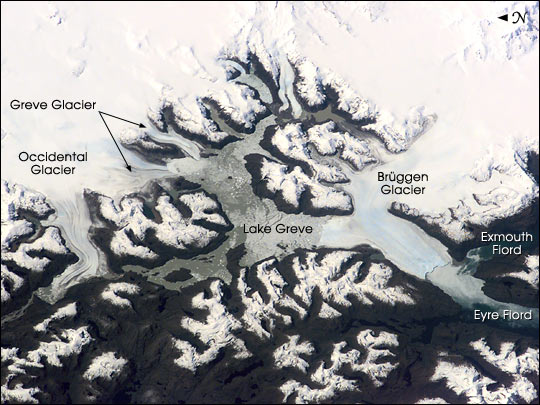
Pío XI Glacier, Magallanes & Chilean Antarctica, Chile

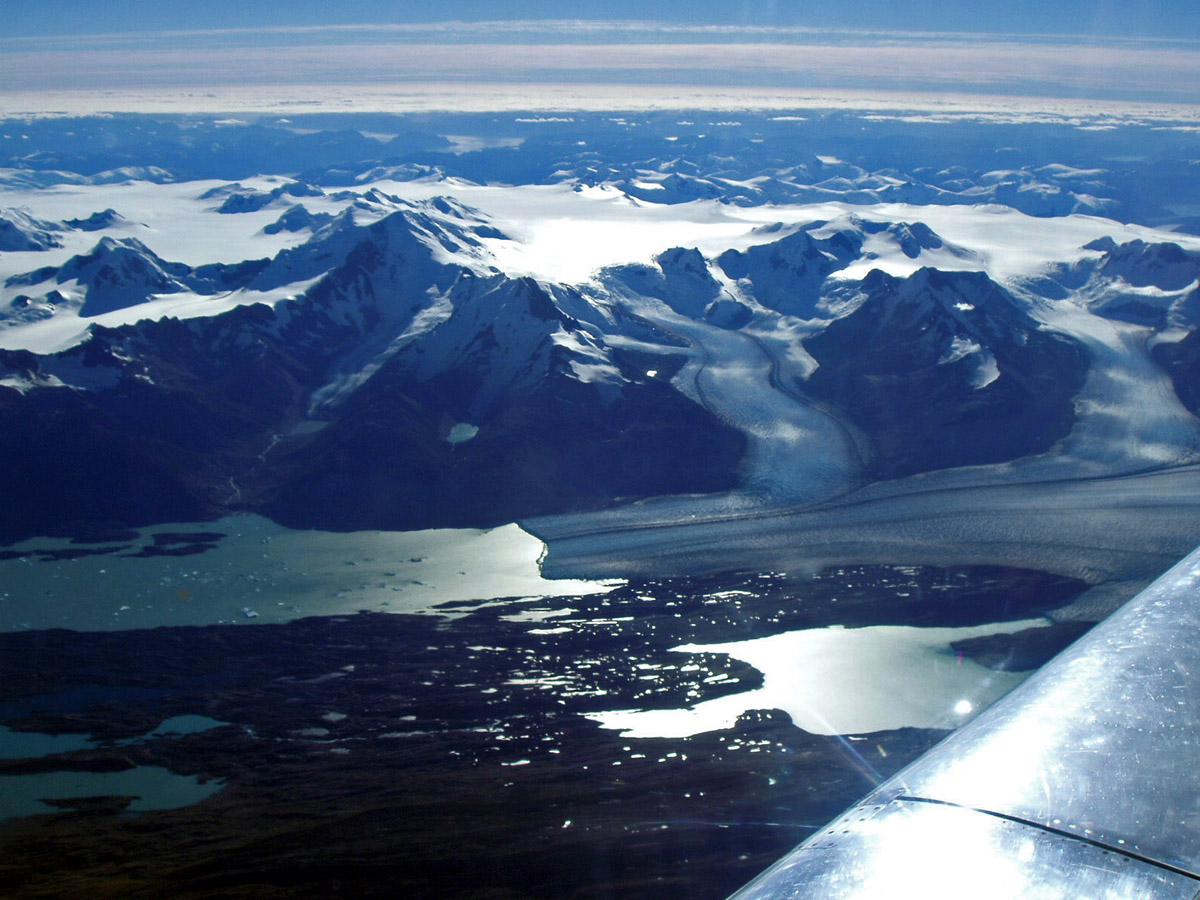
Upsala Glacier, Argentina-Chile

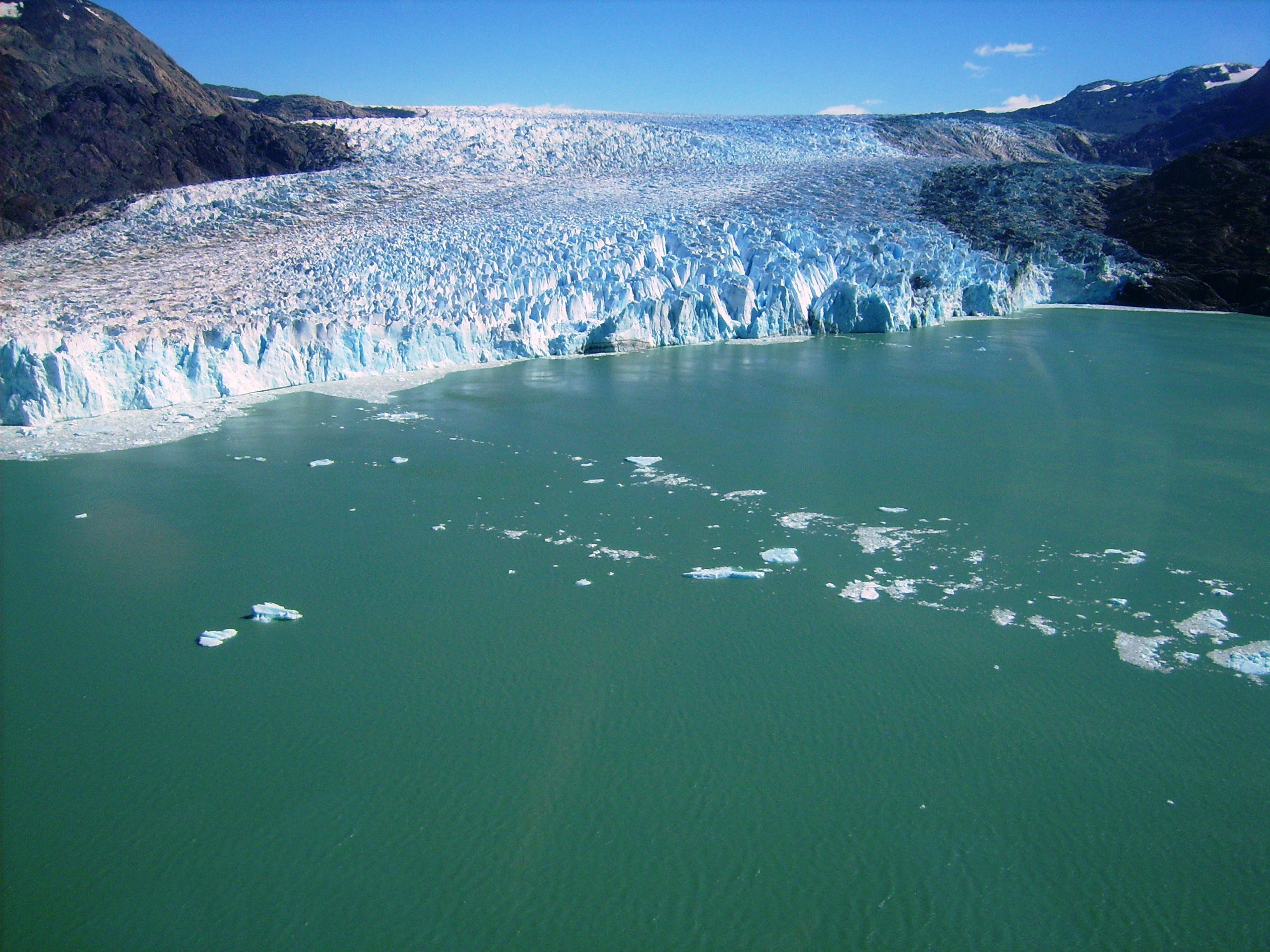
O'Higgins Glacier, Aysén, Chile

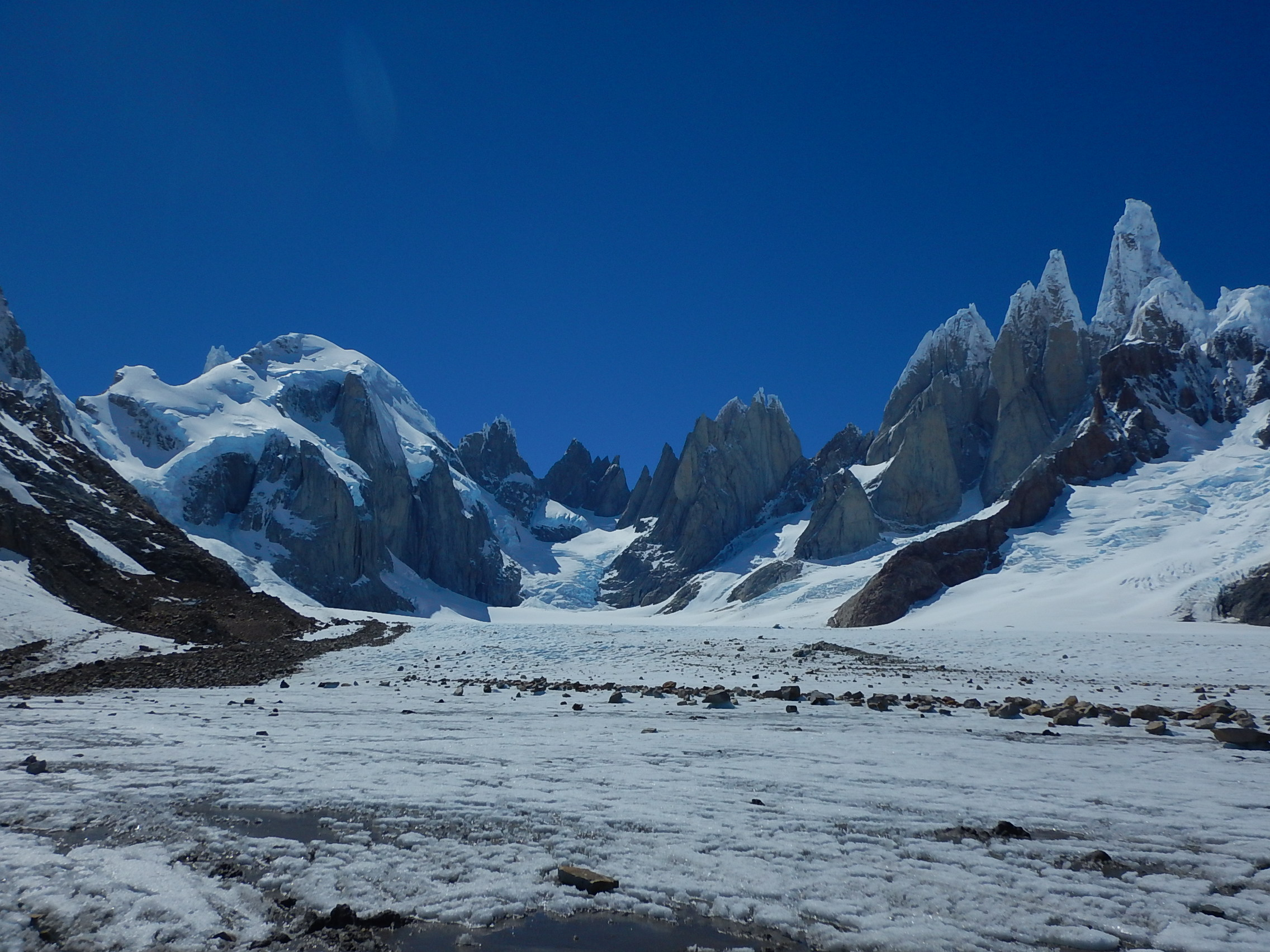
Circo de los Altares

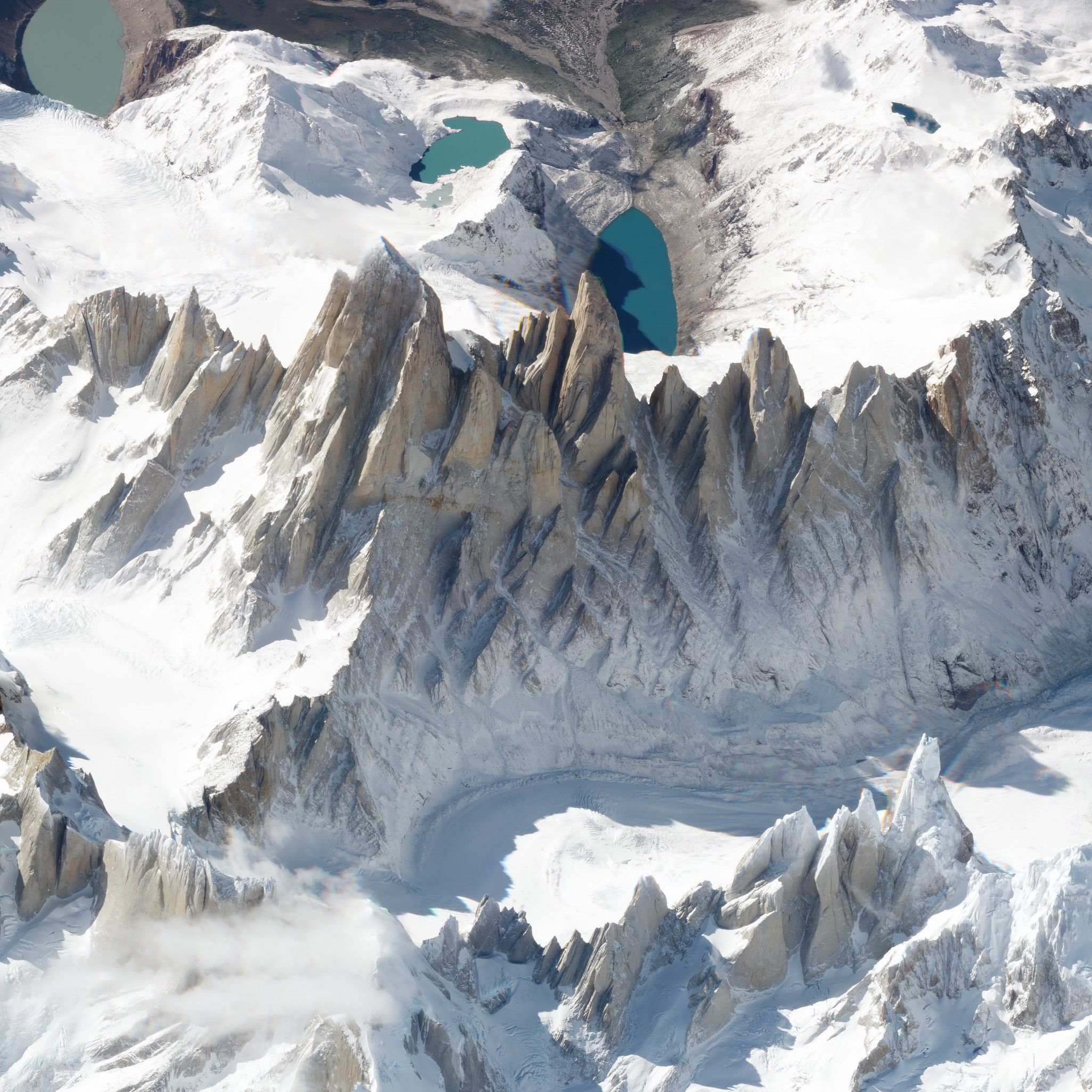
Chaltén Mountain Range Natural Site, Bernardo O'Higgins National Park, Magallanes & Chilean Antarctica, Chile

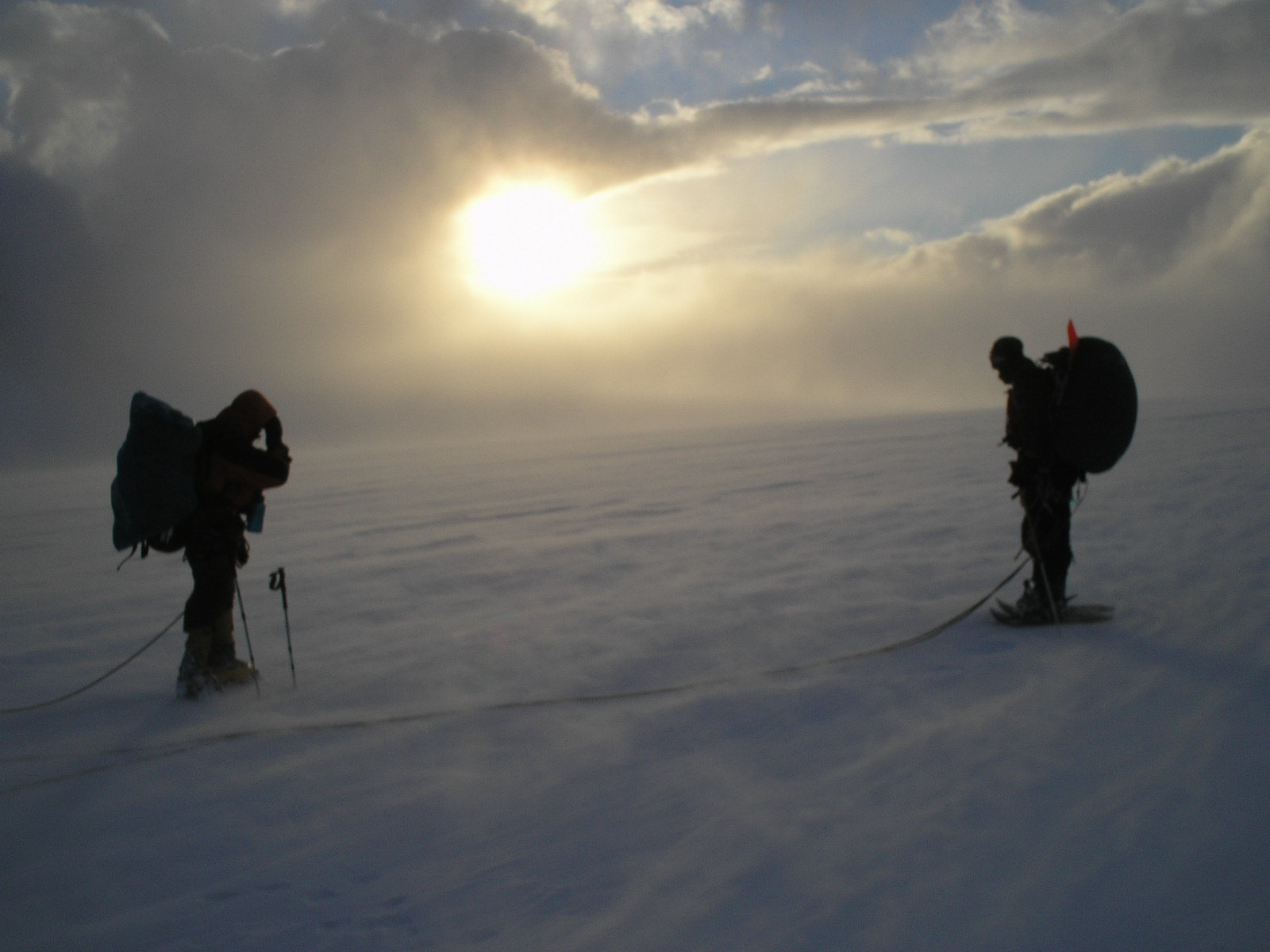
Marconi Pass, Chile-Argentina

== See also ==
- Southern Patagonian Ice Field dispute
- Northern Patagonian Ice Field
- Circo de los Altares
- List of glaciers
- Beagle conflict
- Puna de Atacama dispute
- Glaciarium (museum)
