= Snipe Islet =

Chilean island in the Beagle Channel

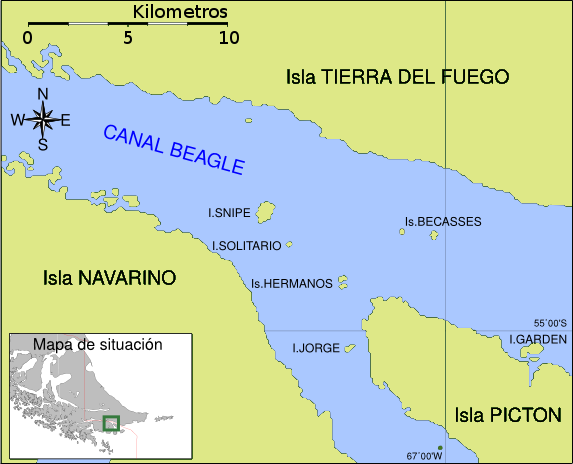
- Map of the Beagle Channel showing the location of Snipe Islet.

- Location within Magallanes and Chilean Antarctica Region

Geography
- Location: Beagle Channel, Tierra del Fuego Archipelago
- Coordinates: 54°57′14″S 67°08′49″W
- Area: 0.31 km^{2} (0.12 sq mi)
- Highest elevation: 42 m (138 ft)

Administration
- Chile
- Region: Magallanes and Chilean Antarctica Region
- Province: Antártica Chilena Province
- Commune: Cabo de Hornos

The Snipe Islet (Spanish: Islote Snipe) is a small rocky islet with sparse vegetation located at the northern entrance to Picton Pass in the Beagle Channel, between Navarino Island, Picton Island, and the Isla Grande de Tierra del Fuego. It belongs administratively to the commune of Cabo de Hornos, Antártica Chilena Province, Magallanes and Chilean Antarctica Region. Possession of the islet was part of the Beagle conflict between Chile and Argentina and was the scene of a major incident between the two countries.

== History ==
The Yaganes, a canoe-faring indigenous people of the region, were the first humans to sight and set foot on the islet.

In the 1820s and 1830s, the brig HMS Beagle, under Robert FitzRoy, sailed through the Beagle Channel, passing near the islet.

In 1881, Chile and Argentina signed a treaty delimiting their border, but disagreements later arose, particularly in the area where the small rocky formation is located.

Both countries began disputing sovereignty rights in the region, with the islet claimed by both (see Maps of the Beagle Channel since 1881). At its eastern mouth, the Beagle Channel splits into two arms with separate outlets; Chile argued that the international boundary should follow the northern arm, known as the Moat Channel; Argentina, however, maintained that the southern arm or Picton Pass—being deeper and running between Navarino and Picton Islands, and then between Picton and Lennox—was the correct course for defining the border. Consequently, Picton and Nueva would lie not south of the Beagle Channel but to its northeast, and under the Treaty of 1881 between Chile and Argentina would belong to Argentina (see 1977 arbitral award).

Argentina also claimed the Picton, Lennox, and Nueva group on the grounds that they lay in Atlantic Ocean waters, while Chile maintained that all disputed islands and waters belonged to the Pacific Ocean, in line with its theory of natural ocean division or the Scotia Arc.

=== Incident ===
The Snipe incident was a military incident that took place between Chile and Argentina during 1958 as a result of a border dispute in the Beagle Channel.

The two countries disagreed about the sovereign rights over the zone and Snipe, an uninhabitable islet between Picton Island and Navarino Island, claimed by both. Chileans call the waterway around the islet Beagle Channel, but in Argentina they called it Moat channel on the grounds that the Beagle Channel, allegedly, went south around Navarino Island. In accordance with the Beagle Channel Arbitration and the Treaty of Peace and Friendship of 1984 between Chile and Argentina, it should be called Beagle Channel.

The incident began on 12 January 1958 as the crew of the Chilean Navy transporter Micalvi built a lighthouse on the Snipe islet to improve navigation in the channel. The beacon of the lighthouse was installed on 1 May.

In April, Isaac Francisco Rojas, Commander of Naval Operations of the Argentine Navy, ordered the destruction of the Chilean lighthouse and its replacement with an Argentine one.

On 11 May, the Argentine lighthouse was dismantled and transported to Puerto Williams by the crew of the Chilean Sotoyomo-class patrol boat Lientur. Later, on 15 May, the same crew recovered the remains of the first Chilean lighthouse that had been removed and thrown into the sea by the crew of the Argentine patrol boat ARA Guaraní.

On 8 June, a new Chilean lighthouse was installed on the islet by the crew of the Lientur.

The next day, 9 June 1958, the Chilean lighthouse was shelled and destroyed by the 4.7 in (120 mm) main guns of the Argentine destroyer ARA San Juan, and a company of Argentine naval infantry occupied the islet to impose the Argentine claim.

Despite the military buildup, a truce was agreed between the parties, that brought a return to previous status quo: no lighthouse and withdrawal of the Argentine military from the islet.

== See also ==
- Islands of Chile
- Geography of Chile
- Insular Chile
- List of islands of Chile
- History of Patagonia
- Chilean Patagonia
- Indigenous peoples of Chile
- List of national parks of Chile
- California Valley, Chile
- Laguna del Desierto
