= List of incidents during the Beagle conflict =

The increasing significance of Beagle channel region led to various incidents and confrontations between Chile and Argentina around transit and fishing rights, which could potentially lead to full-scale war.

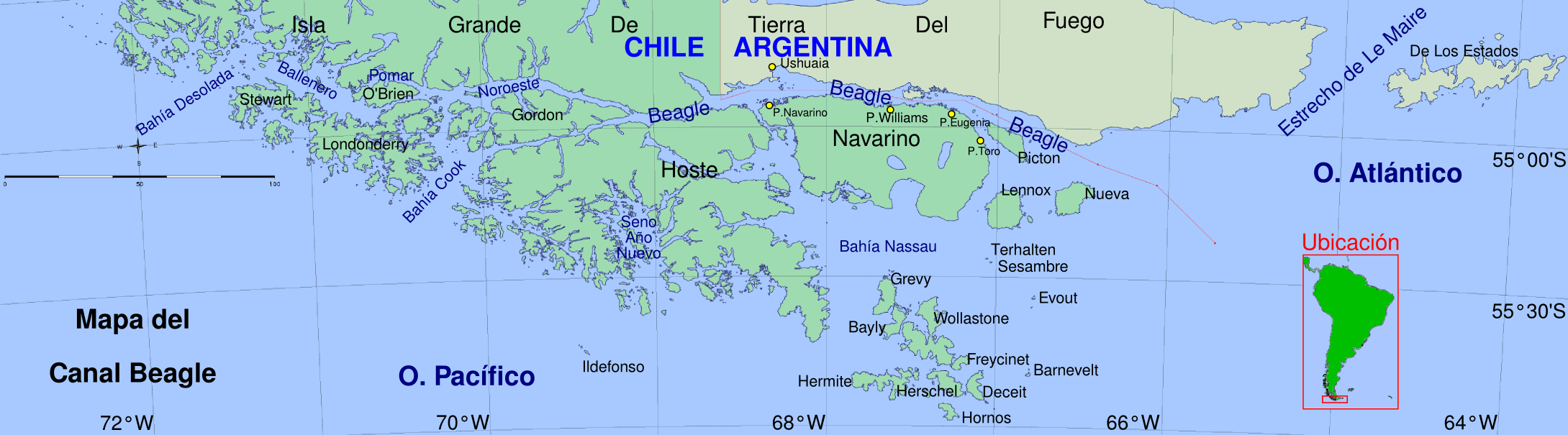
The Beagle channel.

== Argentine request for demarcation in 1904 ==
On 23 August 1904 the Argentine government asked Chile to demarcate (clarify) the naval borders of the Beagle Channel. Chile declined, stating it wasn't necessary because there was a complete cartography of the channel and the previous treaties awarded the islands depending on their location.

== Chilean decree 1914 ==
In order to avoid first world war battles in the Strait of Magellan, on 15 December 1914 Chile declared that the internal waters of the Strait of Magellan as well as the channels around should be considered as Territorial or Neutral Sea, even where they extend more than three miles from shore (the usual definition). In 1914, a German merchant was inspected by a British warship and on 14 March a Norwegian ship was seized by a British warship. Argentina protested the Chilean decree on March 8, 1915, but didn't specify any reason to do so.

== The Snipe Incident ==
In 1958, the Argentine navy shelled a Chilean lighthouse in the (at the time) uninhabited Snipe islet and occupied the island. A severing of ties between the nations took place as a result, with ambassadors being recalled from both nations. The Chilean Navy was sent to the zone and the Argentine Marines were pulled back from the island. It is considered the most serious incident to take place in the zone.

== Ballenita Incident ==
In July 1967, the master of Panamanian ship Ballenita was fined in Chile after it took as passenger an Argentine pilot for the trip to Ushuaia. Because of this, Chilean pilots now have to board ships bound for the Beagle Channel in Montevideo instead of Buenos Aires.

== Cruz del Sur Incident ==
The lucrative centolla fishery around Tierra del Fuego led to an incident in August 1967 when the Argentine schooner Cruz del Sur was found fishing 400 metres (1,300 ft) from Gable Island and had to be ordered by a Chilean Patrol Boat Marinero Fuentealba to retrieve her nets and leave the zone escorted out of Chilean waters.

Few days later the ship re-appeared in the company of an Argentine patrol craft. Protests from both sides were issued at the highest diplomatic level.

== Quidora Incident ==
On 29 November 1967 the Chilean Patrol Boat Quidora (PTF-82) was shelled by the Argentine Navy from Ushuaia.

== The USCGC Southwind affair ==
On 3 February 1968 the USCGC Southwind in emergency conditions headed to Ushuaia via the eastern entrance of the Beagle Channel without notification nor permission of the Chilean Government. The Chileans protested.

== The Barnevelt incident ==
On 21 May 1977, after the arbitral award, the Argentine Navy installed a lighthouse in the (inhabited) Barnevelt Island. It was immediately dismantled by the Chilean Navy.

== On the east mouth of the Magellan Strait ==
On 8 June 1978 Chile sent a diplomatic objection to Argentine activities off the eastern mouth of the Magellan Strait and reserving rights there. In September 1980 an offshore oil rig authorized by Argentina was warned by a Chilean warship and then by military helicopter to abandon the area. Also an Argentine military aircraft threatened a Chilean warship proceeding toward the Strait of Magellan from the Falkland Islands.

== Helicopter incident in 1980 ==
On 15 September 1980 an Argentine helicopter Alouette SA 316B piloted by Miguel Fajre tried to "intercept" four Chilean torpedo boats and two Chilean helicopters heading east to the Snipe Island (See Snipe incident). The probable intention was to impede the discovery of the Argentine Torpedo Boat Indomita, hidden off the Chilean Island Snipe and, further east, the ARA General Belgrano, sunk two years later during the Falkland War.

== ARA Gurruchaga incident ==
On February 19, 1982, six weeks before the beginning of the Falklands War, an incident occurred that could have sparked a full-fledged war between Chile and Argentina during the Papal mediation in the Beagle conflict. An Argentine patrol boat, the ARA Gurruchaga (formerly USS Luiseno) was anchored at Deceit Island inside the Beagle zone under mediation in Vatican, ostensibly providing support for sports boats participating in the Rio de Janeiro-Sydney boat race. The Chilean torpedo boat Quidora approached and ordered the Argentine ship to leave the area. She fired several warning shots when the Argentine craft refused to move, as other Chilean ships converged to the scene. Although originally ordered not to leave the area and to wait for Argentine warships to arrive, the Argentine patrol boat received new orders to proceed to port as it became obvious that the Chilean navy had no intentions of backing down.

== Barão de Teffé Incident 1983 ==
On 18 Januar 1983 the Brazilian research ship Barão de Teffé was heading from Goree passage (between Navarino and Picton islands) to the Beagle Channel as the ship was intercepted by an Argentine Patrol Boat and asked to accept an Argentine pilot for the navigation through the Beagle Channel. After consultations with the Brazilian government the Brazilian captain of the ship decided to change the route to avoid any Argentine intervention in the navigation.

The intention was to compromise some kind of Brazilian support for the Argentine souvereignity over the Channel.

== Shelling of faro de Gusanos ==
On 19 October 1984, as the Chilean and Argentine delegations signed the first agreement to the Treaty of Peace and Friendship of 1984 between Chile and Argentina, the Argentine artillery units fired eight rounds on the Chilean lighthouse "Gusanos" near Puerto Williams on the south shore of the Beagle Channel.

== See also ==
- Laguna del Desierto incident
