= Yendegaia National Park project =

National park in Chile

Coordinates: 54°50′56″S 68°49′24″W

The Yendegaia National Park is a national park project in Chile. The project was launched in 2011 but was halted in February 2013 by the Comptroller General of Chile. The reason for the halting was the lack of documents about watercourses and the a delay in consults with neighboring Yaghan communities.
