= Snipe incident =

1958 Chilean-Argentinian border incident

Coordinates: 54°57′14″S 67°8′53″W

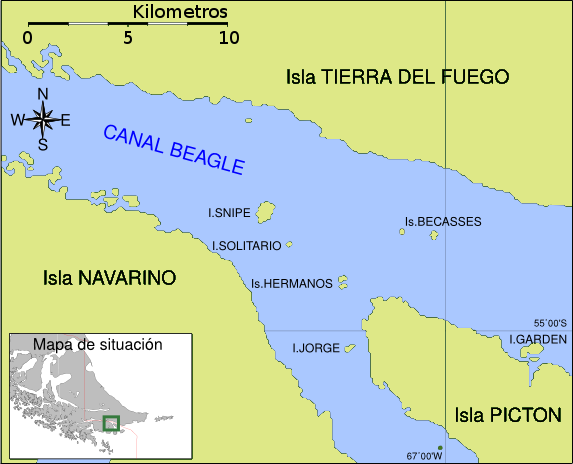
Date	12 January – 9 June 1958
Location	Snipe islet, Beagle Channel
Result	Stalemate

Belligerents
Chile	Argentina

Commanders and leaders
Carlos Ibáñez del Campo; Hugo Alsina Calderón	Arturo Frondizi; Isaac Rojas

Strength
1 transport ship 1 patrol boat 40 marines	1 patrol boat 1 destroyer 80-120 marines

Casualties and losses
none	none

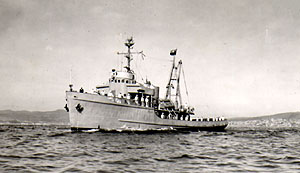
Patrol boat Lientur of the Chilean Navy, a former US Navy fleet tug

The Snipe incident was a military incident that took place between Chile and Argentina during 1958 as a result of a border dispute in the Beagle Channel.

The two countries disagreed about the sovereign rights over the zone and Snipe, an uninhabitable islet between Picton Island and Navarino Island, claimed by both. Chileans call the waterway around the islet Beagle Channel, but in Argentina they called it Moat channel on the grounds that the Beagle Channel, allegedly, went south around Navarino Island. In accordance with the Beagle Channel Arbitration and the Treaty of Peace and Friendship of 1984 between Chile and Argentina, it should be called Beagle Channel.

The incident began on 12 January 1958 as the crew of the Chilean Navy transporter Micalvi built a lighthouse on the Snipe islet to improve navigation in the channel. The beacon of the lighthouse was installed on 1 May.

In April, Isaac Francisco Rojas, Commander of Naval Operations of the Argentine Navy, ordered the destruction of the Chilean lighthouse and its replacement with an Argentine one.

On 11 May, the Argentine lighthouse was dismantled and transported to Puerto Williams by the crew of the Chilean Sotoyomo-class patrol boat Lientur. Later, on 15 May, the same crew recovered the remains of the first Chilean lighthouse that had been removed and thrown into the sea by the crew of the Argentine patrol boat ARA Guaraní.

On 8 June, a new Chilean lighthouse was installed on the islet by the crew of the Lientur.

The next day, 9 June 1958, the Chilean lighthouse was shelled and destroyed by the 4.7 in (120 mm) main guns of the Argentine destroyer ARA San Juan, and a company of Argentine naval infantry occupied the islet to impose the Argentine claim.

Despite the military buildup, a truce was agreed between the parties, that brought a return to previous status quo: no lighthouse and withdrawal of the Argentine military from the islet.

== Aftermath ==
The conflict over the islet (and the zone) was postponed, but Argentina maintained that the zone was disputed, and without a satisfactory solution, there would be no advance or economic use of the zone.

To confront the crisis, the Chilean government, in the last days of the second Carlos Ibáñez del Campo administration, issued the Ley Reservada del Cobre (Spanish for Copper secret law) that provided yearly for part of state-owned Codelco's copper sales, without parliamentary control, for the purchase of weapons.

Twenty years later, in 1978, in order to avoid a repetition of the fait accompli, Chile placed troops on Snipe and their other islands south of the Beagle Channel before Argentina had started a planned invasion, Operation Soberanía.

The dispute was eventually settled when Snipe islet became an internationally recognized territory of Chile under the Treaty of Peace and Friendship of 1984 between Chile and Argentina, after which a lighthouse was built on the islet.

== See also ==
- Falklands War
- Hope Bay incident
- List of violent incidents at the Argentine border
- List of incidents during the Beagle conflict
- Laguna del Desierto incident
- Horquetas Valley
- California Valley, Chile
- Hondo Valley

== Bibliography ==
- Hugo Alsina Calderón, "El incidente del islote Snipe" (PDF), Revista de Marina (in Spanish), archived from the original (PDF) on 17 June 2009
- Alfredo Larreta (17 August 2008), "A 50 años del incidente del islote Snipe", El Mercurio de Valparaíso (in Spanish), Valparaíso, archived from the original on 15 April 2012
- Isaac Francisco Rojas (Koordinator), La Argentina en el Beagle y Atlantico sur, (1° Parte), Editorial Diagraf. (in Spanish)
- Michael Radseck, "Rohstoffe und Rüstung. Hintergründe und Wirkungen ressourcenfinanzierter Waffenkäufe in SüdamerikaLateinamerika" (PDF), Analysen (in German), vol. 16, 1/2007, Hamburg: ILAS, pp. 203–241, archived from the original (PDF) on 10 February 2012
- Escudé, Carlos; Cisneros, Andrés, "Algunas cuestiones con los países vecinos", Historia General de las Relaciones Exteriores de la República Argentina (in Spanish), archived from the original on 17 February 2012
