= Picton, Lennox and Nueva =

Islands of Chile

Picton, Lennox and Nueva Islands
Islas Picton, Nueva y Lennox Nickname: PNL, PLN
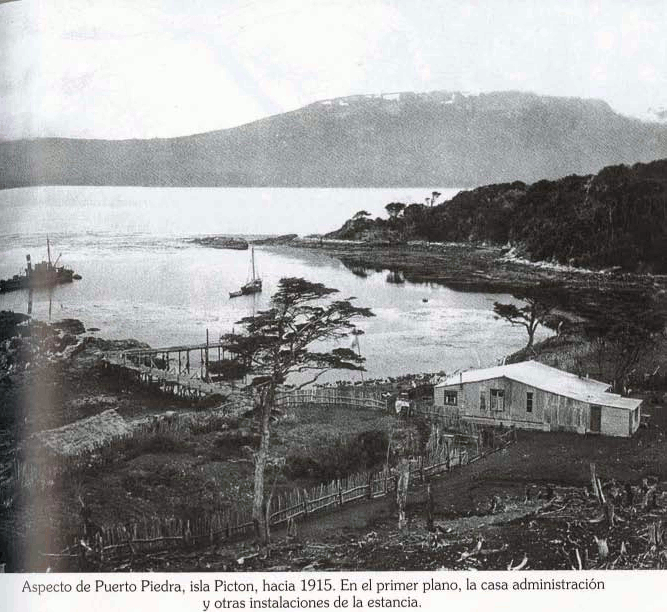
- Puerto Piedra on Picton Island in 1915.

- Location within Magallanes and Chilean Antarctica Region

Geography
- Coordinates: 55.03°S 66.95°W
- Adjacent to: Pacific Ocean; Atlantic Ocean (to the east of the islands)

Administration
- Chile
- Region: Magallanes
- Province: Antártica Chilena
- Commune: Cabo de Hornos

Additional information
- NGA UFI=-896223 (Picton), -893896 (Nueva), -888860 (Lennox)

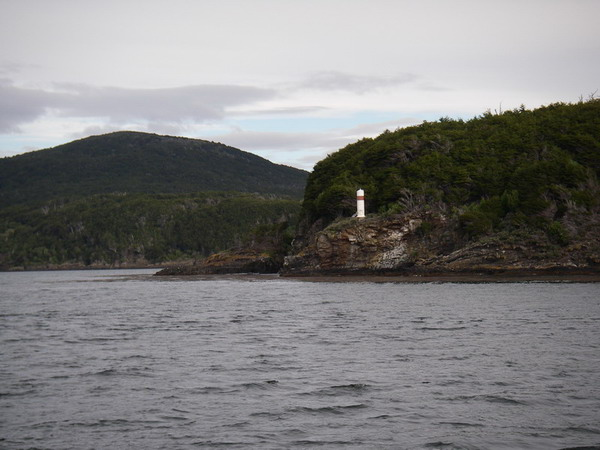
A lighthouse in the Chilean Gardiner island. In the background is Picton Island.

Picton, Lennox and Nueva (Spanish: Islas Picton, Nueva y Lennox) form a group of three islands (and their islets) at the extreme southern tip of South America, in the Chilean commune of Cabo de Hornos in Antártica Chilena Province, Magallanes and Antártica Chilena Region. Located in the Tierra del Fuego archipelago, they lie east of Navarino Island and are separated from the Argentine part of Isla Grande in the north by the Beagle Channel. They have an area of 170.4 km^{2} (Lennox), 105.4 km^{2} (Picton), 120.0 km^{2} (Nueva).

Close to the islands are the islets of Snipe, Augustus, Becasses, Luff, Jorge, Hermanos, Solitario, Gardiner, Terhalten, Sesambre and others.

== History ==
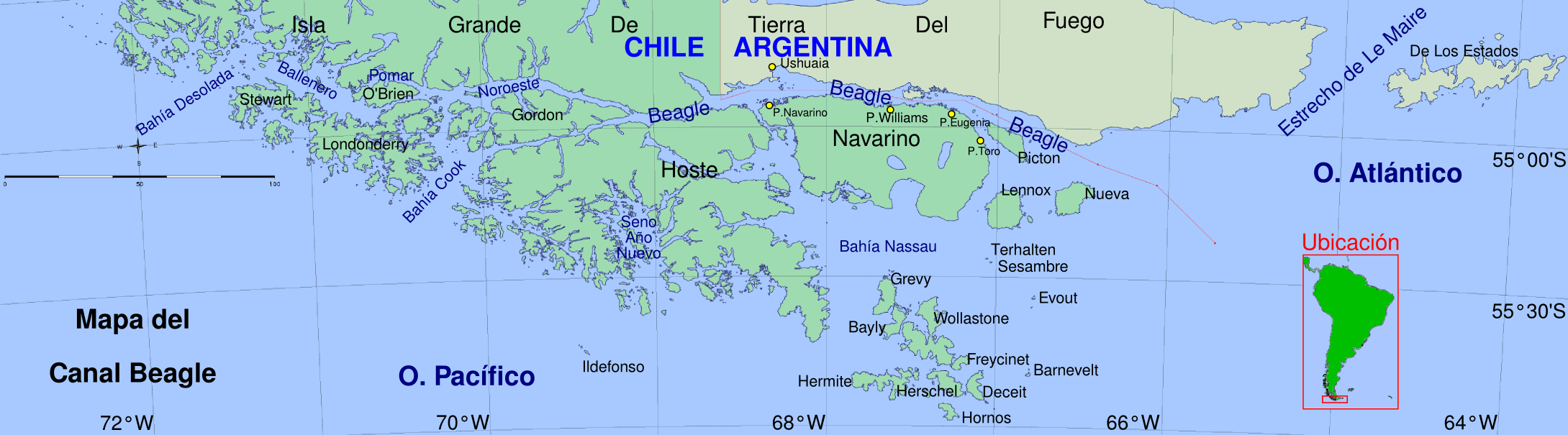
Beagle Channel, from the Pacific Ocean to the Atlantic Ocean.

Robert Fitzroy and Phillip Parker King named the island "Picton" in honour of Thomas Picton, first British governor of Trinidad in the West-Indies. Lennox was discovered in 1624 by Dutch Admiral Schapenham who named the island Terhalten, after the officer who first sighted it. It was renamed later by Fitzroy and Parker King.

From the signing of the boundary treaty of 1881 between Chile and Argentina to 1904, the islands were considered in Chile and Argentina as Chilean territories.

At the end of the 19th century, the Chilean government gave the first concessions to Antonio Milicic for Nueva Island, Esteban Loncaric for Lennox Island and Thomas Bridges for Picton Island. In 1910/11 the following were inhabited: Caleta Las Casas in Nueva Island, Puerto Piedra in Picton Island, and Caleta Oro and Caleta Cúter in Lennox Island (Caleta is Spanish for little bay). These concessions were transferred in the course of time to other entrepreneurs, mostly for cattle farming or mining.

=== Puerto Banner ===
From 3 to 6 December 1914, after the Battle of Coronel, the German East Asia Squadron (armored cruisers Scharnhorst and Gneisenau and the light cruisers Nürnberg, Leipzig, and Dresden and the merchants Santa Isabel, Baden, Seydlitz and the captured Norwegian ship Drummuir) under the command of Admiral Graf Spee moored off Puerto Banner on the way to the Battle of the Falkland Islands. This was considered by Chile as a violation of its neutrality and forced the government to establish Puerto Banner as a coaling station for the Chilean Navy. Puerto Banner served twice as the coaling station of the Yelcho during her services to rescue the Imperial Trans-Antarctic Expedition of Ernest Shackleton.

During the Chilean land reform, the east part of Navarino Island and the three islands (86,000 ha) were part of an economic unit and plan to benefit the settlers. Puerto Toro, the next settlement to the islands, in Navarino Island, was re-established in 1969.

=== Operation Soberanía ===
Due to their strategic location south of the Beagle Channel and facing the border between the Pacific Ocean and the Atlantic Ocean, the islands had been claimed since 1904 by Argentina, not because of the treaty of 1881 but for so-called "political reasons". Whichever government controlled Picton, Lennox and Nueva could stake territorial rights further into the Ocean (important for the fishing industry), to several other islands, and to a larger part of Antarctica, where resource development and exploration were important.

The dispute over control of the islands continued into the late 20th century. On 22 July 1971 Salvador Allende and Alejandro Lanusse, the presidents of Chile and Argentina, respectively, signed an arbitration agreement (the Arbitration Agreement of 1971). This agreement was to settle their dispute over the territorial and maritime boundaries between them, and in particular the title to the Picton, Nueva and Lennox islands near the extreme end of the South American continent. It was submitted to binding arbitration under the auspices of Queen Elizabeth II of the United Kingdom.

On 25 January 1978 Argentina repudiated the arbitration decision. It began to prepare for war and the three islands plus the Hermite and Wollastone islands became the main objective of the Argentines. In order to increase deterrence against the Operation Soberanía, the Chilean Navy installed minefields in strategic areas on the islands. On 22 December 1978, Argentina commenced (and a few hours later aborted) Operation Soberanía to invade both those islands and continental Chile. Although it called off the operation, the Argentine government never gave up on the use of military force to pressure Chile. After the invasion of the Falklands on 2 April 1982, the Argentine junta planned the military occupation of the three islands, as stated by Brigadier Basilio Lami Dozo, chief of the Argentine Air Force during the Falklands war, in an interview with the Argentine magazine Perfil:

L.F. Galtieri: "They [the Chileans] had better take note because it's their turn next..

The last minefields were installed shortly after the 1982 Argentine invasion of the Falkland Islands. Since 2007 mine clearance in Chile has been carried out by de-mining units of the army and navy.

== Literature ==
The Survivors of the "Jonathan", also known as Magellania, is a novel written by Jules Verne in 1897 and published posthumously in 1909, after it had been rewritten by Verne's son Michel under the title Les naufragés du "Jonathan".

The novel tells the story of a mysterious man named Kaw-djer who lives on the Nueva Island, whose motto is "Neither God nor master". He refused any contact with western civilization, relying on himself in order to survive and also provides assistance to the indigenous peoples of Magellania. However, the 1881 Boundary Treaty will destroy his paradise of individualist anarchism because it will end the state of terra nullius in the region.

== See also ==
- Operation Soberania
- Beagle Channel cartography since 1881
- Allen Francis Gardiner
- Islands of Chile
- List of islands of Chile
