= Ley Reservada del Cobre =

1958 Chilean secret law

The Chilean Law N° 13.196 known as Ley Reservada del Cobre (Spanish for "Restricted Law on Copper") was a highly controversial secret law ("restricted" in this context refers to the law not being freely available) issued on 29 October 1958 under the administration of Carlos Ibáñez del Campo in order to allocate revenues from the copper mining corporations for the purchase and maintenance of materiel of the Chilean armed forces. The law was replaced in 2019, with the armed forces' finances scheduled to come under the national budget by 2029.

== History ==
Automatic military funding from natural resources revenues can be traced in Chile to the 1880s.

On 7 January 1938, law N° 6.152, known as Ley de Cruceros (Spanish for "Cruciers Law"), was issued to transfer 90% of the leasing receipts of South Patagonian territories to arms purchases. Later, in 1942, the Chilean Government, worried about the ongoing Pacific War and the defense, created the CONSUDENA, Consejo Superior de la Defensa Nacional, and allowed them to allocate revenues from currency dealings, alcohol tax, cigarettes tax and income from big copper companies for the purchase of weapons without parliamentary oversight.

The Ley de Cruceros or Ley Reservada del Cobre was issued in 1958 after a serious military incident on the Snipe islet by the administration of President Ibáñez in order to deviate funds from tax revenues from big copper mining corporations directly to the armed forces. The Chilean nationalization of copper transferred in 1971 the properties of the big copper mining corporations Anaconda Copper Company and Kennecott Utah Copper Corporation to the Chilean state and in 1976 CODELCO was created in order to manage the development and production. The law has been modified in 1973, 1975, 1986 and 1987.

History of the Law
Law or Decree	floor	% tax or receipts	Changes
Ley de Arrendamiento de Magallanes, Ley del CONSUDENA
Ley 6.152 amongst others (7 January 1938)	unknown	90% of the state leasing receipts in South Patagonia	
Ley 7.144 (5 January 1942)	4.000.000 CLP	as above, plus currency dealings and alcohol and cigarettes tax	Creation of CONSUDENA
Ley Reservada del Cobre
Ley 13.196 (19 November 1958)	8.5 mil. USD	15% of the tax revenue from the copper big corporations (tax was 50%)	Introduction of compensation payment if a lowest amount can't be reached; changeover to US$
Amendments 1973-1990 under A. Pinochet
Decreto ley 239 (31 December 1973)	90 mil. USD	10% of the total receipts of the copper big corporations from abroad	division in equals parts for army, navy and air force
D.L. 1.530 (21 Juli 1976)	90 mil. USD	10% from gross receipts of CODELCO coming from copper sales abroad plus 10% of deposits of CODELCO abroad	implementation of secret accounts for navy, army, air force and COSUDENA; CONSUDENA get upon request 10% of the incomes
Ley 18.445 (17 October 1985)	180 mil USD	as D.L. 1530 plus 10% of gross receipts from abroad sales of CODELCO's byproducts	annually inflation-adjustment for the basic allowance according to the United States-inflation effective from 1 January 1987; Implementation of a reassignment plan for surpluses
Ley 18.628 (23 Juni 1987)	unmodified	unmodified	The assignation of the revenues is under approbation of the chiefs of army, air force and navy.
Amendments 1990-2006 under the Concertación
Official expertise of Contraloría General de la República de Chile (December 2002)	unmodified	unmodified	Distribution between navy, army and air force doesn't affect the right of the CONSUDENA to decide about the total of the revenues; Implementation of a fond for surpluses.

== The Law ==
The Ley Reservada del Cobre stipulates that 10 per cent of Codelco's export sales are to be transferred to the armed forces. Each year Codelco deposits the earmarked resources in dollars in three secret accounts (army, air force and navy) at the Central Bank of Chile. These accounts are maintained outside the treasury single account and the parliamentary oversight, fragmenting it and impeding obtaining the benefits of managing all government cash in a centralized way.

The expected minimum contribution is US$180 million annually, the floor, to be adjusted according to variations in the U.S. Producer Price Index. In case the revenues are less than the stated amount, as in 1986 and 1987 occurred, the Treasury must supply the difference (US$38 and US$25 million, respectively).

During the decade 1995-2005 the government managed to restrict the annual level of investment spending by the armed forces by imposing a ceiling on them in order to guarantee that their expenditures are consistent with the structural fiscal balance limit. However, the ceiling does not reduce the amounts received by the armed forces; any surpluses are accumulated in the bank accounts of the defense sector.

In 2011, the Finance Ministry took over management of the military's copper fund from the Defence Ministry.

== Criticism ==
Cooper price and revenues of the Ley Reservada del Cobre according to Michael Radseck.

Funding the Chilean military with off-budget revenues from a stateowned company is controversial and not in line with practices in most developed countries because:

- it is outside democratic control,
- it doesn't compete with other sectors for funds
- it does not necessarily reflect the government's priorities and sectoral strategies
- it is not under supervision or accountability on the use of the funds

In addition, the procurement process for military equipment is a closed process. As stated by SIPRI, “Chile’s arms procurement process is almost entirely under the armed forces’ control and takes place with little or no civilian political involvement”.

A January 7, 2007, article in The New York Times explained that “record prices for copper, Chile’s main export, have given the government a multibillion-dollar windfall, but it also has produced for Chile’s economy unexpected side effects and has set off a sharp political debate about how to use the money.”

Also the fact that Codelco serves the interests of the armed forces is viewed as a serious impediment for a firm that strives to be a worldclass mining company.

== A new law ==
Legal initiatives modifying the financing scheme, establishing a four-year budget and replacing the current law, has been announced on September 8, 2009, by Michelle Bachelet and May 17, 2011, by President Sebastián Piñera.

Under Bachelet's project, allocations for arms procurement will be made on a yearly basis as part of the national budget; there will be a 12-year strategic plan for long-term procurement, revisable every four years by the president; and the unspent funds received under the 1958 law will be used to create a contingency fund for the replacement or refurbishment of equipment. The project was not approved.

Piñera's project considers multi-annual budgets approved during the first year in office of each government, a planning process with a horizon of twelve years, reincorporation of Congress into the debate on defense strategic capabilities, creation of a Strategic Contingency Fund, which will allow the Armed Forces to address unforeseen circumstances arising from external threats or national disasters. Piñera revived this bill, with amendments, in 2018, and signed it into law in September 2019.

== See also ==
- Chilean armed forces
