= Isaac Rojas =

Navy Admiral and Vice President of Argentina

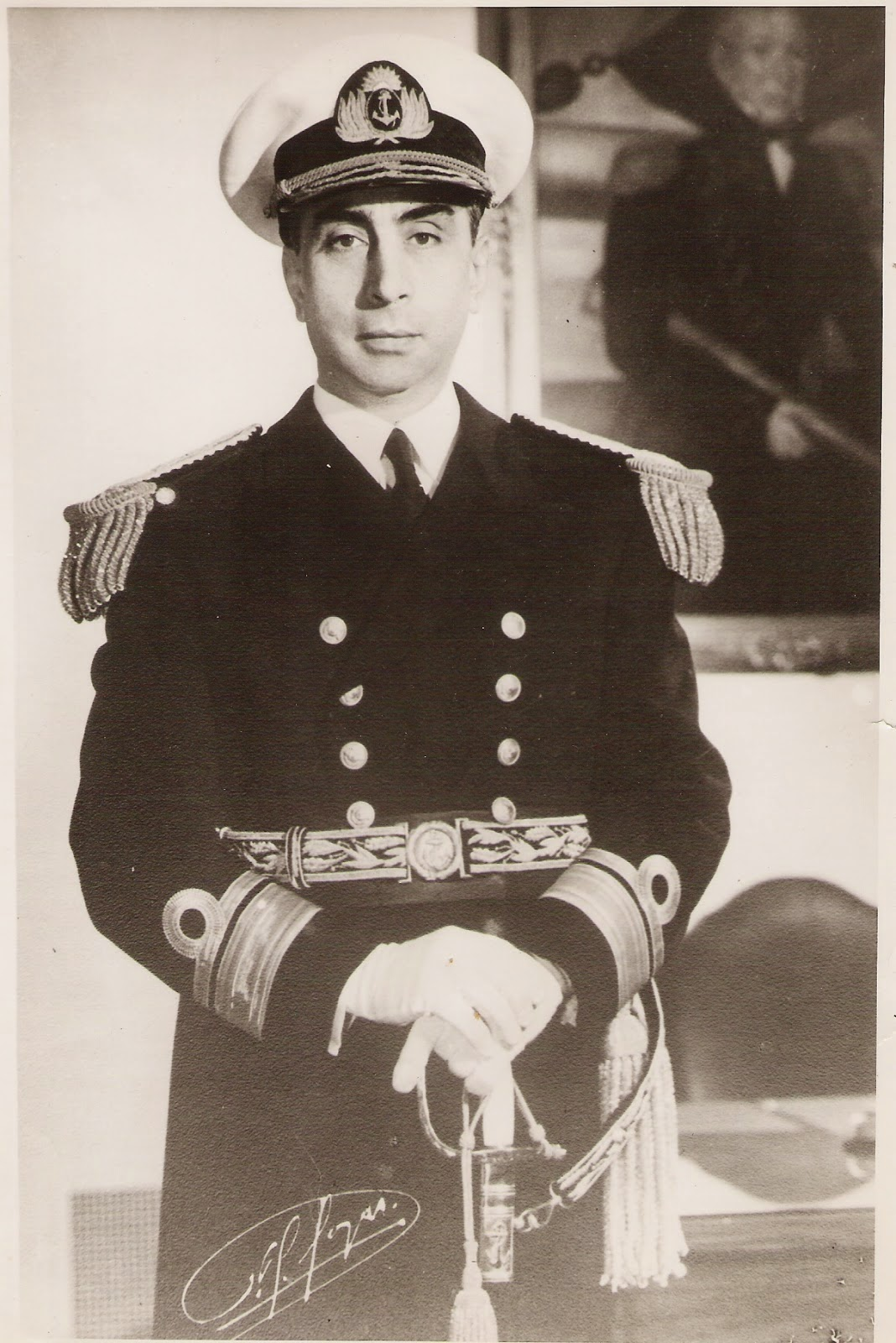
- Isaac Rojas, 1955

24th Vice President of Argentina
- In office September 23, 1955 – May 1, 1958
- President: Eduardo Lonardi (Sep–Nov 1955); Pedro Eugenio Aramburu (1955–1958)
- Preceded by: Alberto Teisaire
- Succeeded by: Alejandro Gómez

Commander of Naval Operations (Supreme Command of the Naval Forces as Commander-in-Chief of the Navy in Operations or Command of the warships in Operations)
- In office 18 September 1955 – 1 May 1958
- President: Eduardo Lonardi (as Provisional President of the Nation); Eduardo Lonardi; Pedro Eugenio Aramburu
- Preceded by: Carlos María Rivero De Olazábal
- Succeeded by: Adolfo Baltasar Estévez

Personal details
- Born: December 3, 1906 Buenos Aires
- Died: April 13, 1993 (aged 86) Buenos Aires
- Party: none
- Spouse: Lía Edith Sánchez
- Profession: Military

Isaac Francisco Rojas Madariaga (December 3, 1906 – April 13, 1993) was an Argentine Admiral of the Navy and de facto Vice President of Argentina. He joined the Argentine Navy and had an unremarkable career until the 1946 election of Juan Perón.

== Under Perón ==
He was Naval attache in Brazil and Uruguay, and later he became close to the influential First Lady, Eva Perón, and served as her naval aide-de-camp until her death in 1952. He was then named head of the Río Santiago Naval Academy (close to the site of an important naval shipyard), though in August 1955, he was persuaded to take part in the coup d'état that toppled Perón on September. Credited with leading the Navy during the rebellion, Rojas obtained Perón's resignation and exile by commandeering the ARA General Belgrano - threatening to bombard the YPF refinery in Ensenada (then the nation's largest).

== Vice president ==
On 23 September 1955 he was rewarded with the vice presidency at the Navy's insistence, and remained in the post until President Pedro Aramburu relinquished power to elected authorities in May 1958.

Rojas imposed a staunch anti-Peronist and anti-Communist as vice president, though he supported Aramburu's call for Constitutional Assembly elections in 1957, overcoming objections from the largely conservative Navy. Peronism was banned, and remained so until 1972.

In 1958 as commander of Naval Operations of the Argentine Navy he was involved in the Snipe incident, when he ordered the destruction of the Chilean lighthouse and its replacement with an Argentine one.

== Return to Democracy ==
Following the return to democracy with the election of President Arturo Frondizi, Rojas remained a vocal supporter of military action to prevent the return of Peronism, and participated in the failed April 1963 coup attempt against President José María Guido (who was himself appointed in Frondizi's replacement for the sake of preventing a Peronist resurgence at the polls). Following Army Chief Juan Carlos Onganía's defeat of the coup attempt, Rojas was confined to his uptown Buenos Aires apartment, after which he largely limited his contact with the public to occasional columns in conservative newspapers such as La Prensa and La Nación. He opposed the Antarctic Treaty of 1961 and later to the Beagle Channel Arbitration. He was founder of the “Movimiento Pro-impugnación del Laudo Arbitral del Beagle” and was a staunch supporter of the ill-fated Falklands War against Britain. He died in Buenos Aires, making it his dying wish that his ashes be scattered at the site of the sinking of the Belgrano during the 1982 conflict.

== List of books written by Isaac Rojas ==
- "La ofensiva geopolítica brasileña en la Cuenca del Plata",
- "La Argentina en el Beagle y Atlántico Sur: Parte 1"
- "Intereses argentinos en la Cuenca del Plata"
- "Argentina en el Atlántico, Chile en el Pacífico"
- "Una geopolítica nacional desintegrante"
- "Memorias del almirante Isaac F. Rojas"
- "La revolución libertadora"
- "Memoria sobre la controversia argentino-chilena"
- "Carlos Pellegrini: su espiritu militar y las fuerzas armadas"
- "La cuestión del Beagle y de las islas argentinas de la zona austral usurpadas por Chile"

== See also ==
- Revolución Libertadora
- Snipe incident
- 1963 Argentine Navy revolt

Political offices
Preceded by Alberto Teisaire	Vice President of Argentina; 1955–1958	Succeeded by Alejandro Gómez
