= Comptroller General of Chile =

Chile's supreme audit institution

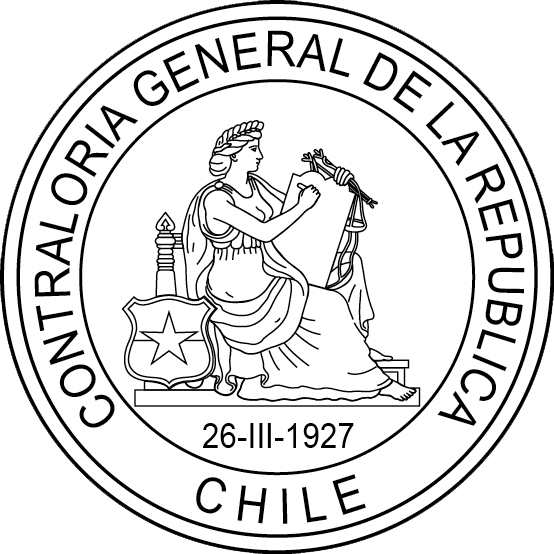
Logo of the "CGR"

The General Comptroller of the Republic of Chile (Spanish: Contraloría General de República de Chile) is a constitutionally autonomous body of the Government of Chile based on chapter 10 of the Constitution of Chile and it is in charge of the control of the legal aspects, management, preaudit and postaudit functions of all the activities of the centralized and decentralized civil service, whatever its forms of organization may be, as well as of other powers granted by law.

== History ==
The Office of Comptroller General of the Republic (Oficina de la Contraloría General de la República) was designed partially following the recommendations of a Mission of US economic advisers led by Edwin Walter Kemmerer. The office was finally established during the administration of Carlos Ibáñez in 1927. The first head of the office was the lawyer Pablo Ramírez who simultaneously served as Minister of Finance. In 1943 the office was upgraded to an autonomous government organ through an amendment to the constitution (Law 7,727) and was retained as such in the constitution of 1980.

== Functions ==
Charged with serving as the government's auditor, it must take part in the approval or rejection of the revenue and investment accounts of public funds, scrutinizes the collection and expenditure of government funds by the National Treasury, the municipalities, and other state services as determined by law.

The office also performs a legality review function called "toma de razón" (taking consideration). Exercising this ex-ante review power, the comptroller scrutinises, on constitutional and legal grounds, executive decisions and regulations prior to their official publication or communication. In practice, this checking procedure may represent an effective veto point in the Chilean administrative process. Another aspect of the legal control function of the office consists in its power to issue legally binding opinions on issues concerning the laws that govern administrative bodies and procedures. Both public entities and private parties can request the office to clarify any point of law arising from the functioning of public services. The access to the office is therefore remarkably broad. In practice, the exercise of the interpretive power has entailed that many practitioners use the office as an administrative tribunal which works alongside the ordinary judiciary in the country.

== Transparency ==
Over the years, the agency gained a reputation for insisting on strict conformity to the law, instilling respect in career officials and elected officials alike.

2009 the General Accounting Office of the Republic was ranked fourth in the VI Barometer of Access to Public Information, study reflecting the perception the media has in terms of transparency and cooperation of various Agencies of public importance in the country. In 2008 the position of the Contraloría was five places lower.

== See also ==
- Politics of Chile
- Law of Chile
- Ley Reservada del Cobre
