= Beagle Channel cartography since 1881 =

The region of the Beagle Channel, explored by Robert FitzRoy in the 1830s, was one of the last to be colonized by Chile and Argentina. The cold weather, the long distances from other inhabited regions, and the shortage of transport and subsistence, kept it far from the governmental task.

In the maps exhibited in this page it is possible to appreciate the lacking knowledge of the geography by navigators and explorers of the zone and also the statesmen who had to decide on the borders. Nevertheless, when the Boundary treaty of 1881 between Chile and Argentina was signed, in the Beagle Channel zone at least the main islands and waterways were known.

The Beagle Channel Arbitration Court reviewed in-depth the cartography of the zone and stated that:

Finally, the Court wishes to stress again that its conclusion to the effect that the [Picton, Nueva and Lennox Islands] group is Chilean according to the 1881 Treaty has been reached on the basis of its interpretation of the Treaty, especially as set forth in paragraphs 55–111 above, and independently of the cartography of the case which has been taken account of only for purposes of confirmation or corroboration. The same applies in respect of the particular maps discussed in, and from, paragraph 119 onwards.

— §163

== Before 1881 ==
There was no agreement about the sovereignty over Patagonia and archipelago of Tierra del Fuego before the Boundary treaty of 1881 between Chile and Argentina. While Chile and Argentina claimed territories on both side of the 1984 defined border as own territories, the US and the European powers considered the land and islands often as Res nullius, although the Chilean settlement, and later city, of Punta Arenas at the Strait of Magellan existed since 1843.

Maps of Patagonia and Tierra del Fuego before 1881

French map 1862: Patagonia and Tierra del Fuego are Res nullius, although Patagonia is claimed by Argentina.

US map 1835: Chilean West-Patagonia. East-Patagonia and Tierra del Fuego are Res nullius.

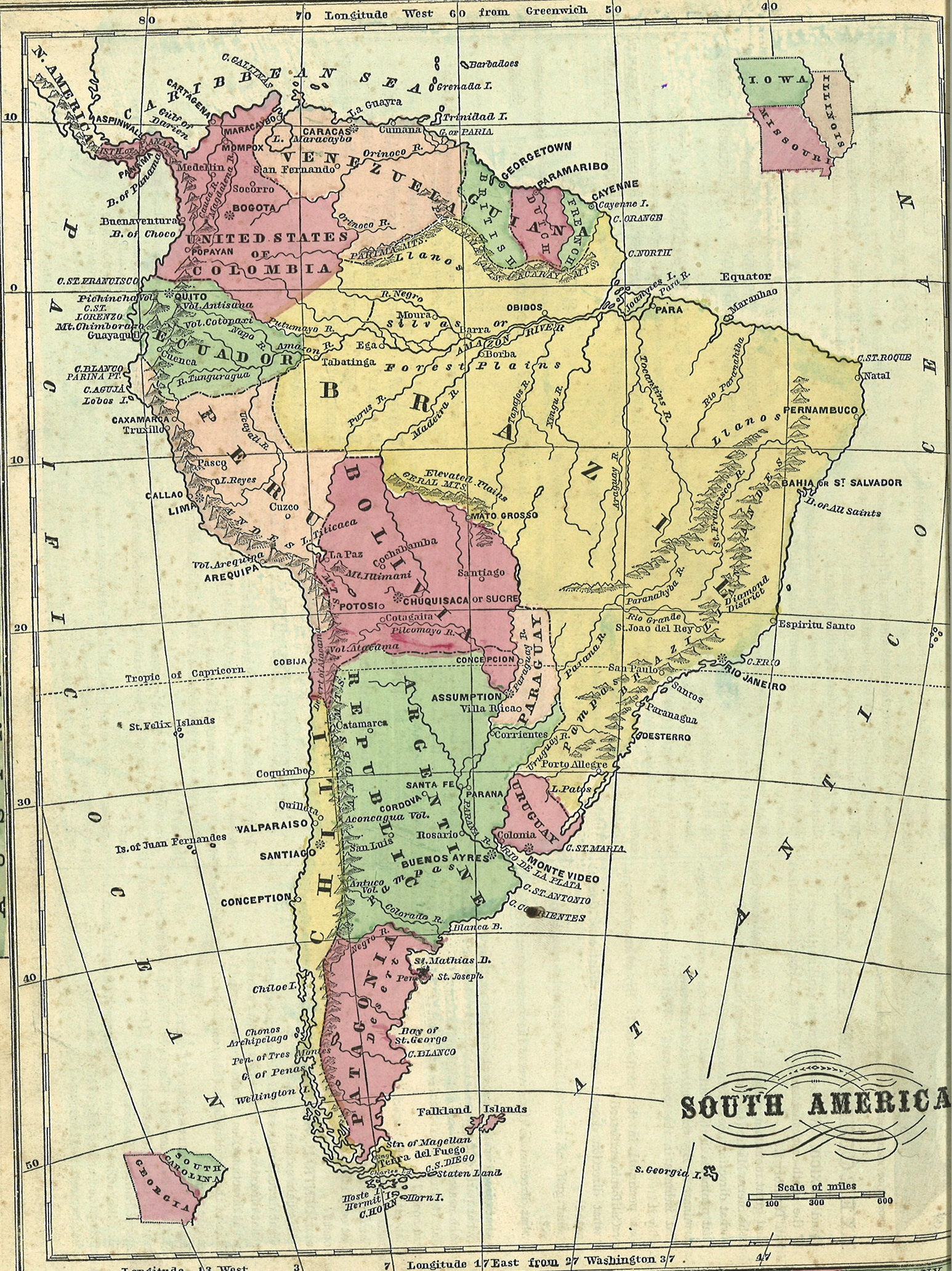
US map 1872: Chilean West-Patagonia and Tierra del Fuego. East-Patagonia is Res nulllius.

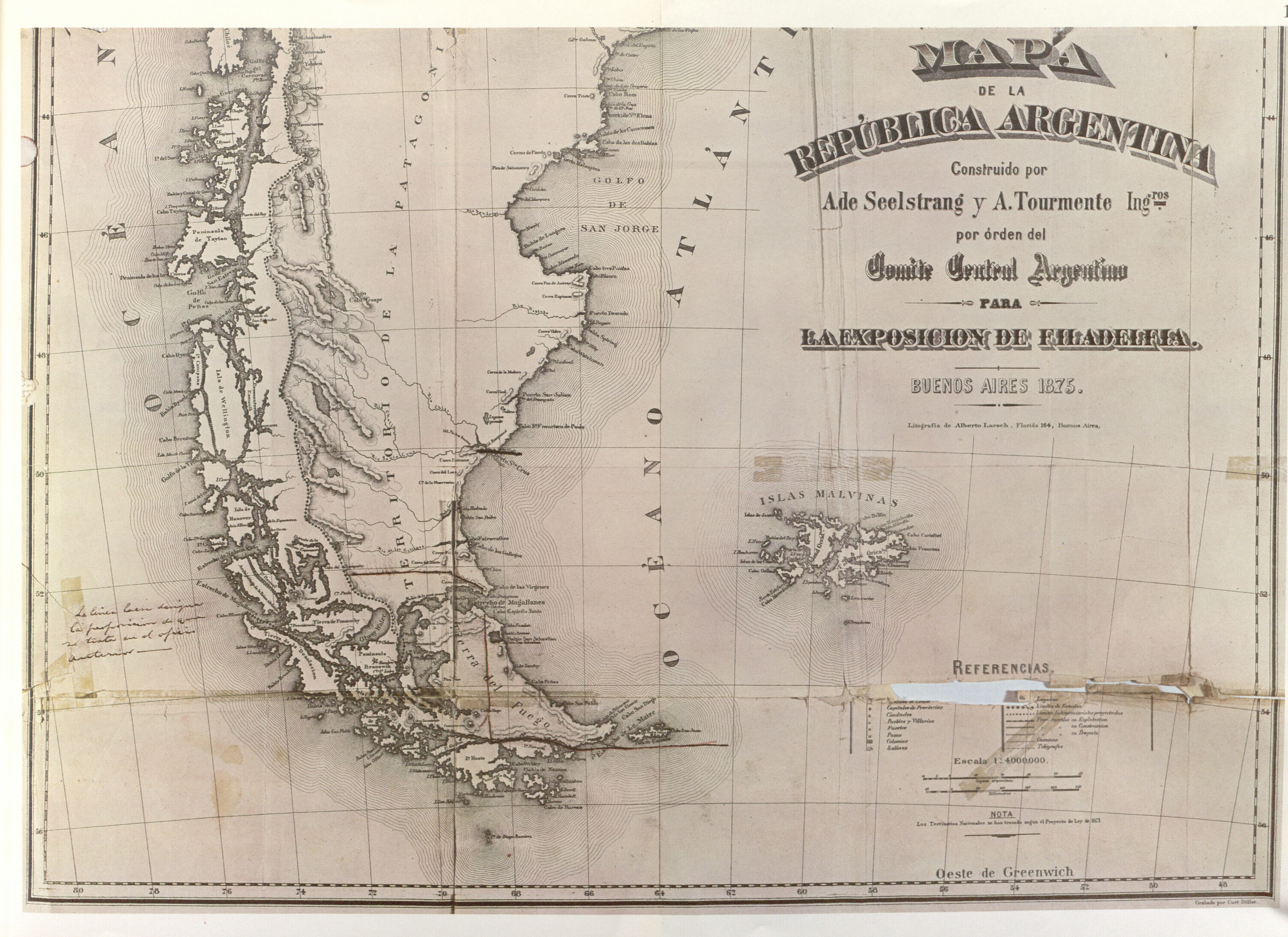
Argentine map 1875: Chilean West-Patagonia, Argentine East-Patagagonia and Tierra del Fuego.

== The concordant Interpretation of the 1881 Boundary Treaty from 1881 to 1888 ==
From 1881 to 1888 show almost all Argentine maps the Picton, Lennox and Nueva islands as Chilean Territories.

All Chilean maps have shown always the islands as Chilean territories, like the map of engineer Alejandro Bertrand showed here. This border line is today valid for both countries.

There were some few dissentient (Argentine) maps in this period, but the Court declared it untrustworthy because of its "excentric" borderline. (see below).

=== Map in "La Ilustración Argentina", 1881 ===
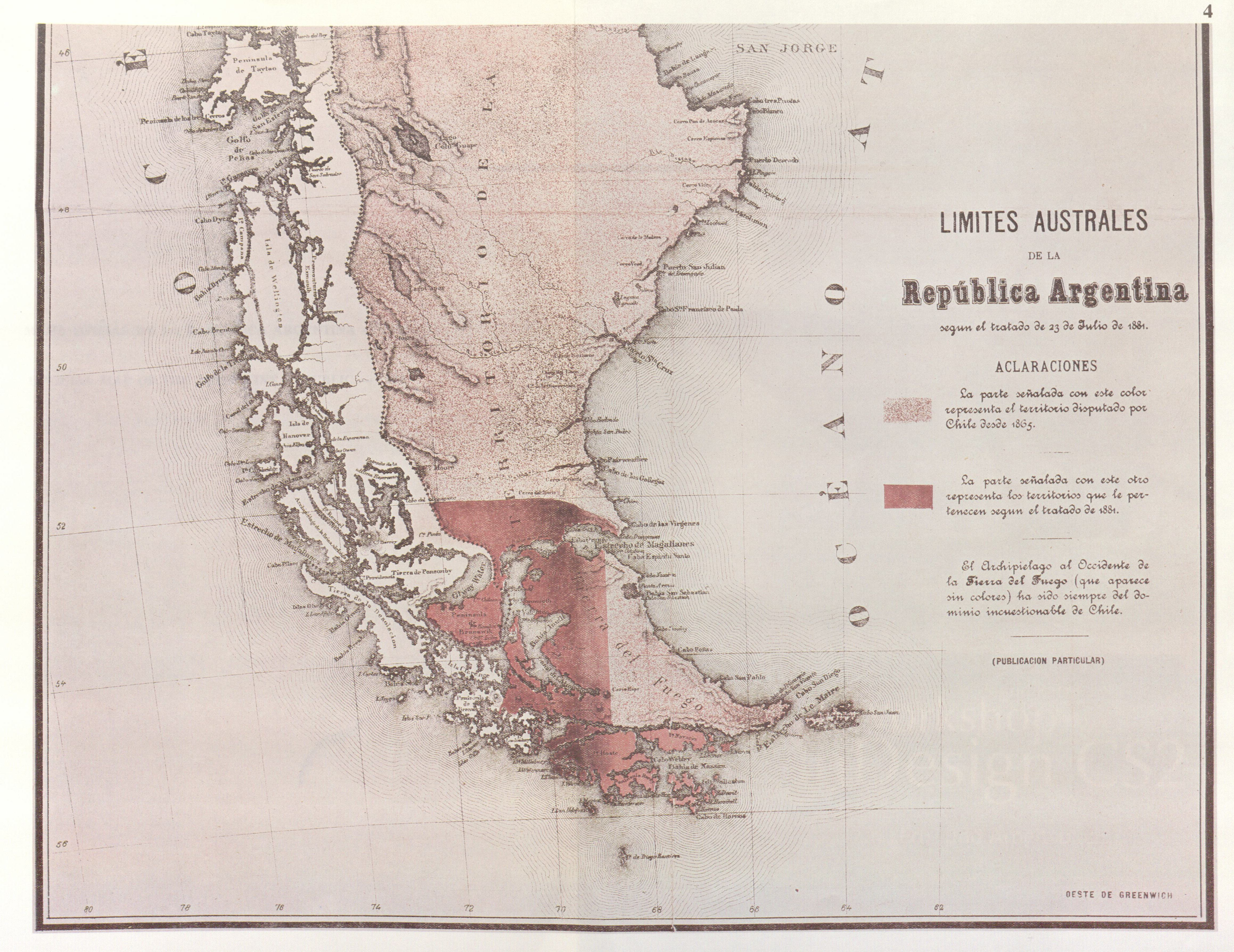

Partial reproduction of the first Argentine map showing the boundaries laid down in the Boundary Treaty of 23 July 1881, appeared in "La Ilustracion Argentina" issue of 10 November 1881 in Buenos Aires. The copy reproduced here is one handed to the British Minister Plenipontentiary in Buenos Aires by Dr. Bernardo de Irigoyen, Argentine Minister of Foreign Affairs who negotiated and signed the Boundary Treaty. The original is located in the official British Archives. The British Minister sent it to his Government with the comment that the dark shaded area "comprising the Strait of Magellan, half of Tierra del Fuego and all the southern islands, represent was actually has been ceded to Chile by the recent Treaty." (under Irigoyen map)

=== Map of Francisco Latzina, 1882 ===
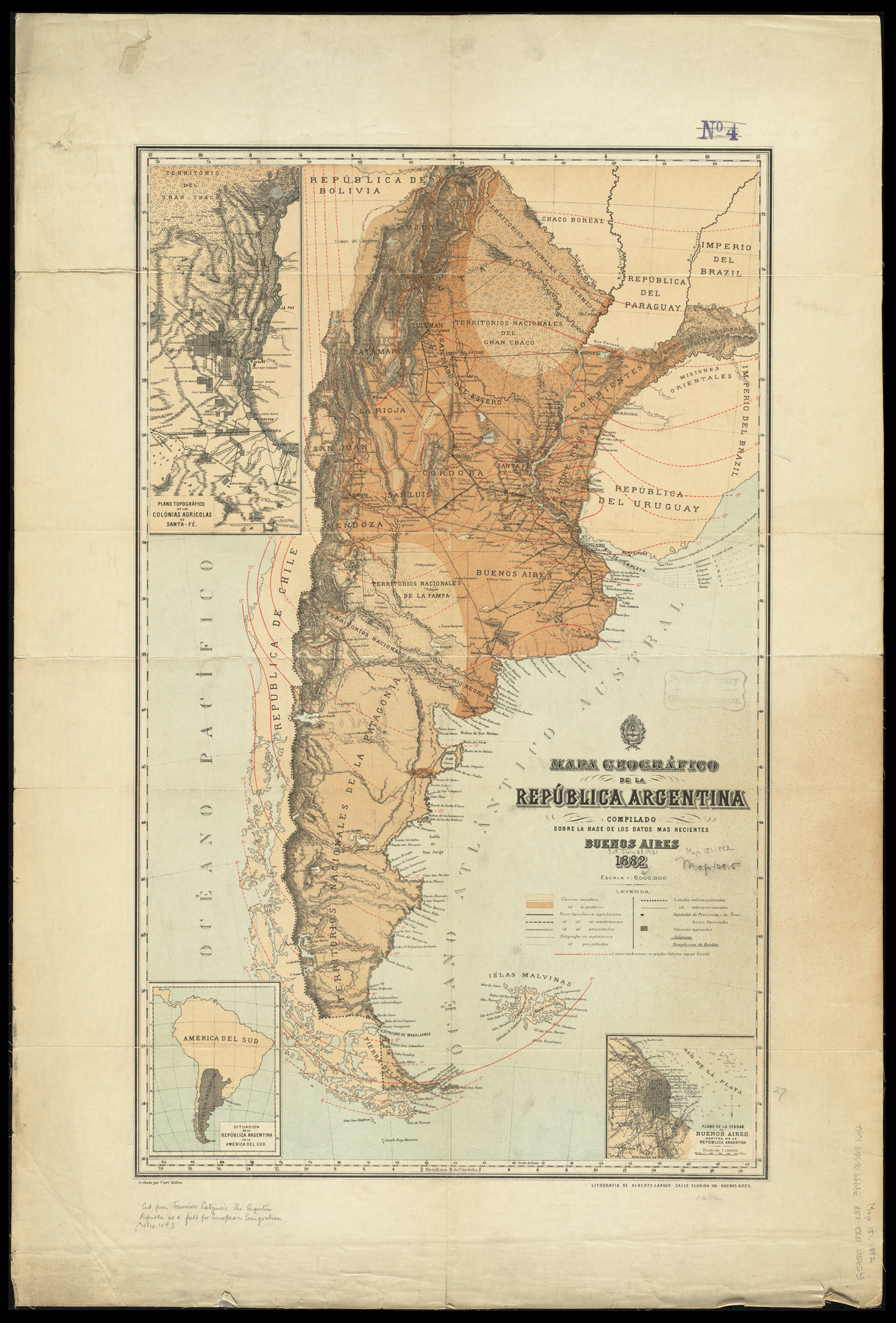

This map reproduced here is regarded by Chile as first official Argentine map after the Boundary Treaty of 1881, though its official character was subsequently denied by the Argentine Government. It was ordered to be drawn up by the then Argentine Minister of the Interior, Bernardo de Irigoyen (who had previously been Minister of Foreign Affairs in which capacity he signed the Boundary Treaty of 1881) for inclusion in an official publication issued by the Director of the National Statistics Office, Dr. Francisco Latzina, in 1883 under the title "The Argentine Republic as a field for European Immigration" (under Latzina map of 1882). This was published in Spanish, English, German, French and Italian in an edition of 120.000 copies. On the official map all the islands located south of the Beagle Channel are shown under Chilean Sovereignty.

=== Official map of the Republic of Chile, 1883 ===
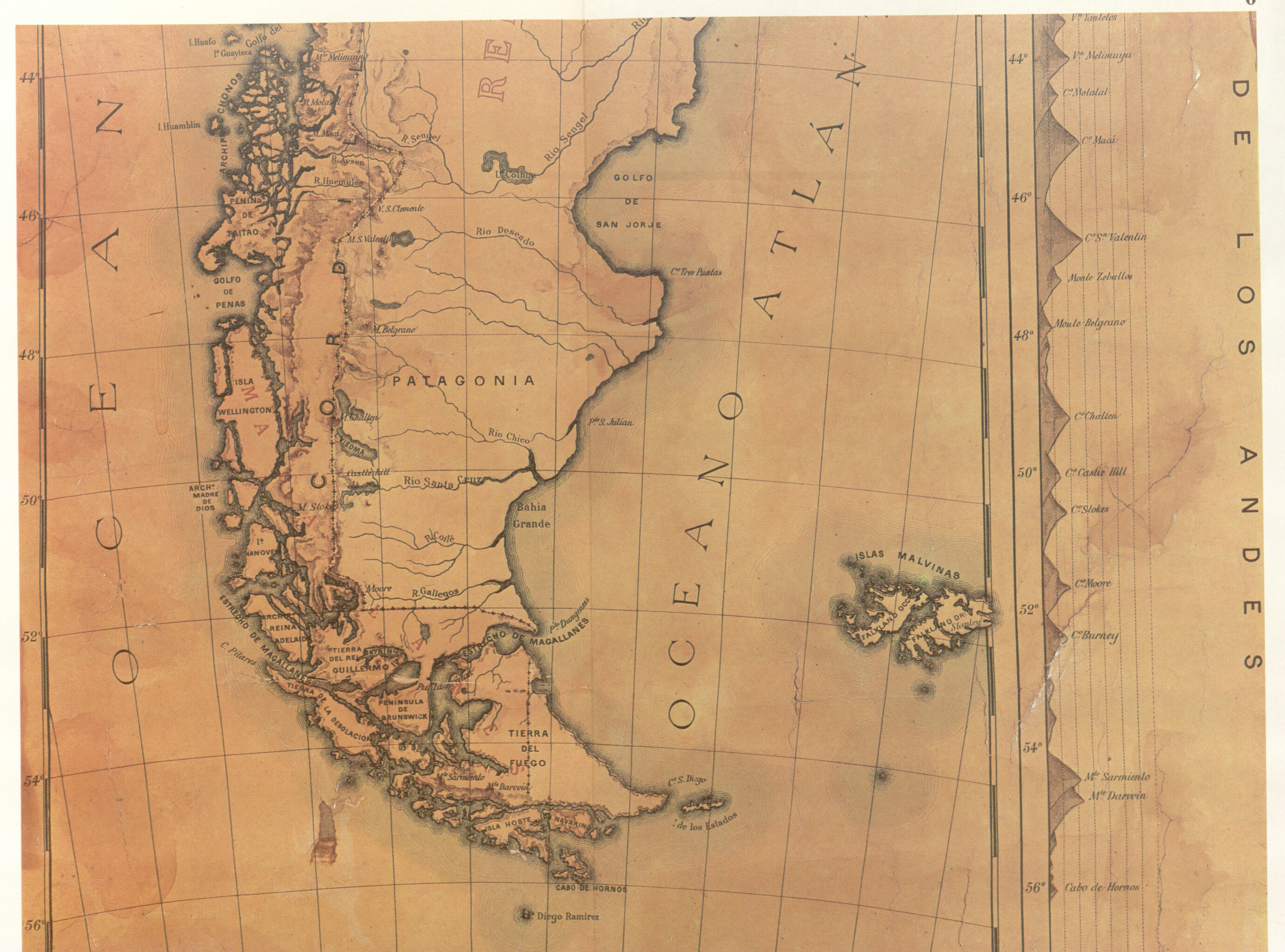

This official map of Chile, partially reproduced here, "was drawn up on the orders of the Chilean Government for use in primary schools in the Republic and with a view to the most recent data" by Alejandro Bertrand in 1884. The author, an engineer, was member of the Boundary Commissions charged with marking out the Chilean-Argentine Frontier. At the time the map was approved by the Chilean Hydrographic Office. On the map all the islands south of the Beagle Channel as far as Cape Hoorn are shown as being under Chilean sovereignty. All Chilean maps have shown this border line since 1881.

=== Map of the "Instituto Geográfico Argentino", 1886 ===
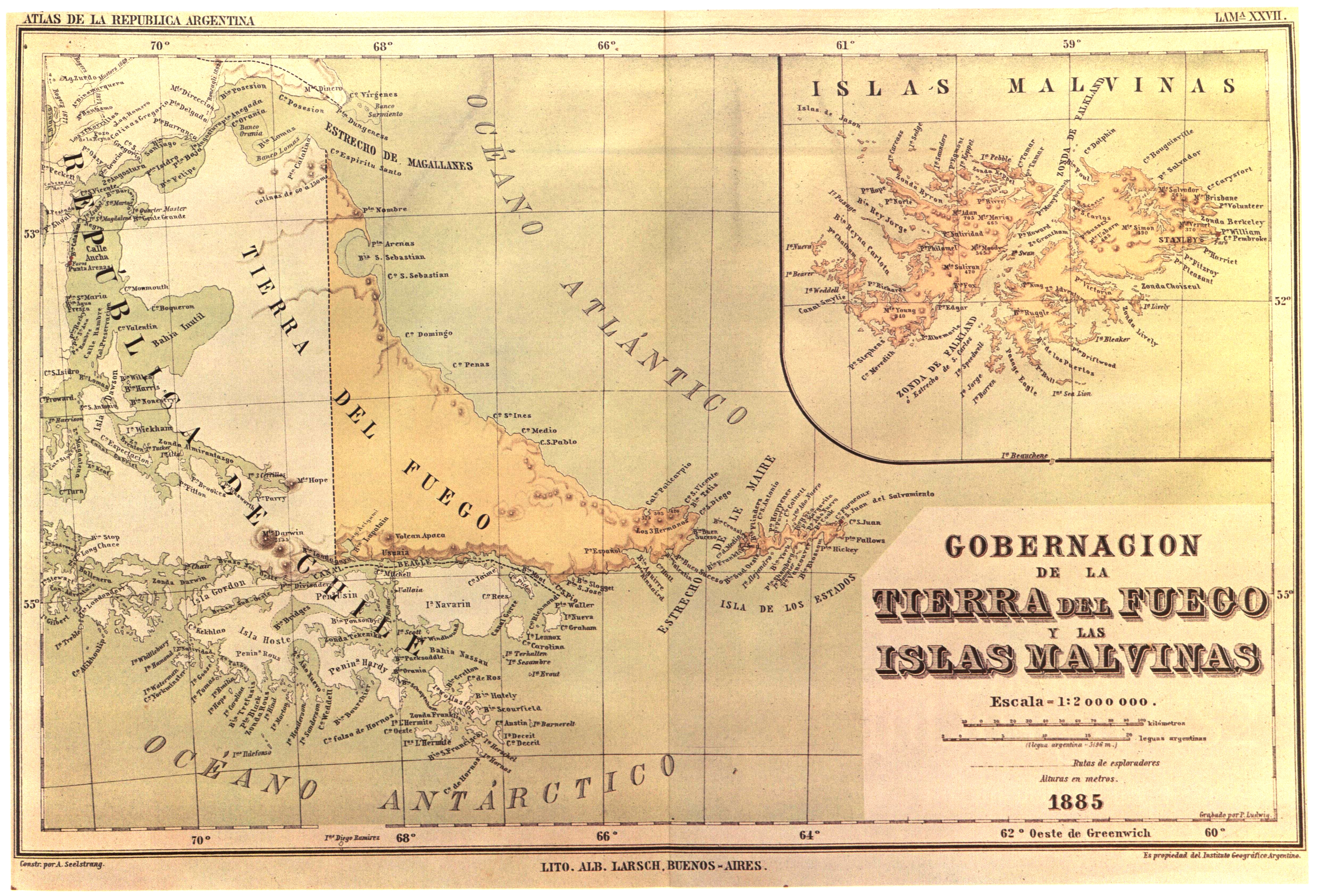

In 1882 the Argentine Geographic Institute decided to issue a general map and an atlas of the Argentine Republic. The task was put in the hands of the well known Professor of the (Argentine) University of Córdoba, Arturo Seelstrang, who had already brought out a map of the Republic in 1875. The Atlas was "constructed and published" by the institute "under the auspices of the National Government". Plate XXVII of the Atlas, reproduced here, was headed "Gobernacion de la Tierra del Fuego Y Las Islas Malvinas" ("Governorship of Tierra del Fuego and the Malvinas Islands") and were drawn up in 1885 and published the following year. As may be observed, the map shows the boundary line running through the centre of the Beagle Channel, indicating Picton, Nueva and Lennox Islands an all the other islands and islets extending southwards as far as Cape Horn as being under Chilean sovereignty.

=== General Map of the Argentine Republic and neighbouring countries, 1886 ===
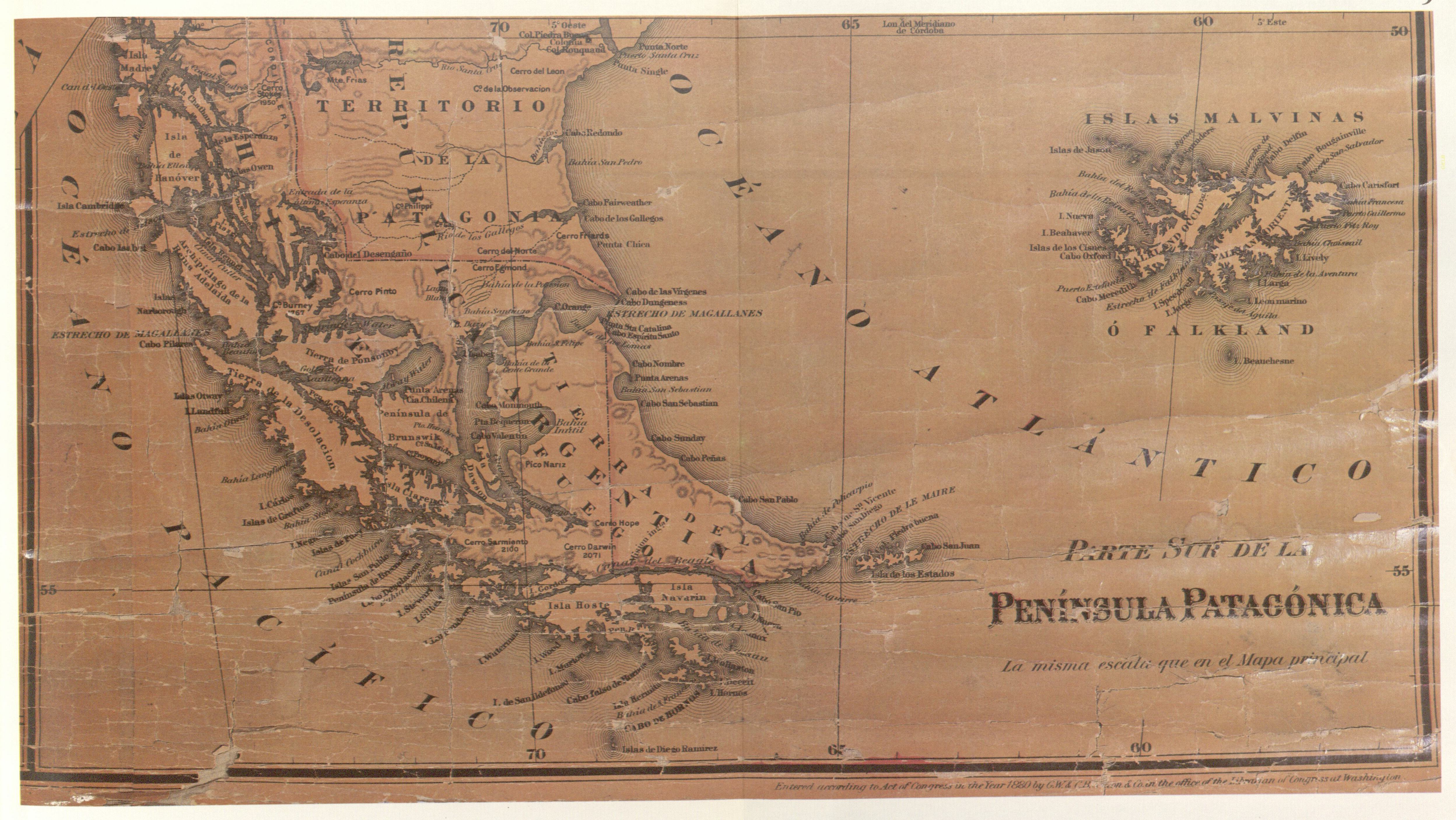

General Map of the Argentine Republic and neighbouring countries, 1886. The map shown here states that it was "made according to the latest official data" and "in the light of the latest plans and sketches" by Francisco Moreno, Argentine expert on the commission for marking out the frontier with Chile, and by Lieutenant-Colonel José Olascoaga, Head of the Military Typographic Office.

At the bottom, right, the map bears the inscription in the Library of Congress.

As may be observed, the international boundary is traced along the centre of the Beagle Channel, showing Picton, Nueva and Lennox and all the other islands and islets extending southwards as far as Cape Horn as being under Chilean sovereignty.

=== Map of Francisco Latzina, 1888 ===
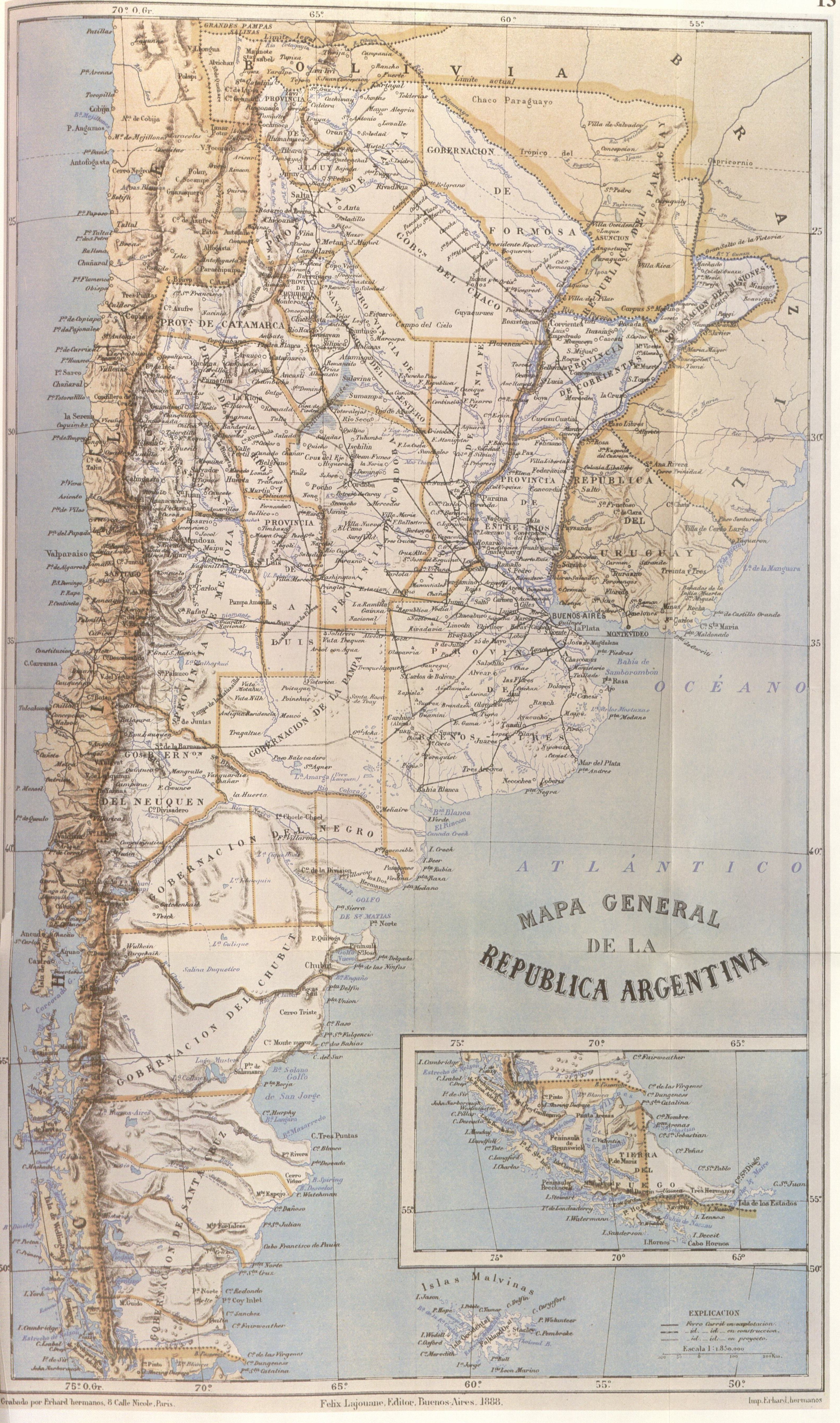

This map, reproduced here, is included in the book Geography of the Argentine Republic (Geografía de la República Argentina) published in Buenos Aires in 1888, editorial Lajouane, by Francisco Latzina, National Director of the Argentine Statistics Institute and member of numerous scientific societies. "This work obtained the 'Rivadavia Award' [Gran Premio Bernardino Rivadavia] of the 'Argentine Geographic Institute' and a large number of copies of it were ordered by the Argentine authorities for distribution in Europe and elsewhere." The jury was conformed by Estanislao Zeballos, Bartolomé Mitre, Julio Argentino Roca, Domingo Faustino Sarmiento, Guillermo Rawson and Lucio V. Mansilla.

In the extreme southern region, the international boundary is traced along the centre of the Beagle Channel and stretches to the south of the Isla de los Estados. Here it shows Picton, Nueva and Lennox Islands and all other islands and islets extending southward as far as Cape Horn as being under Chilean sovereignty.

=== Two maps of Argentina, Mariano Paz Soldán, 1888 ===
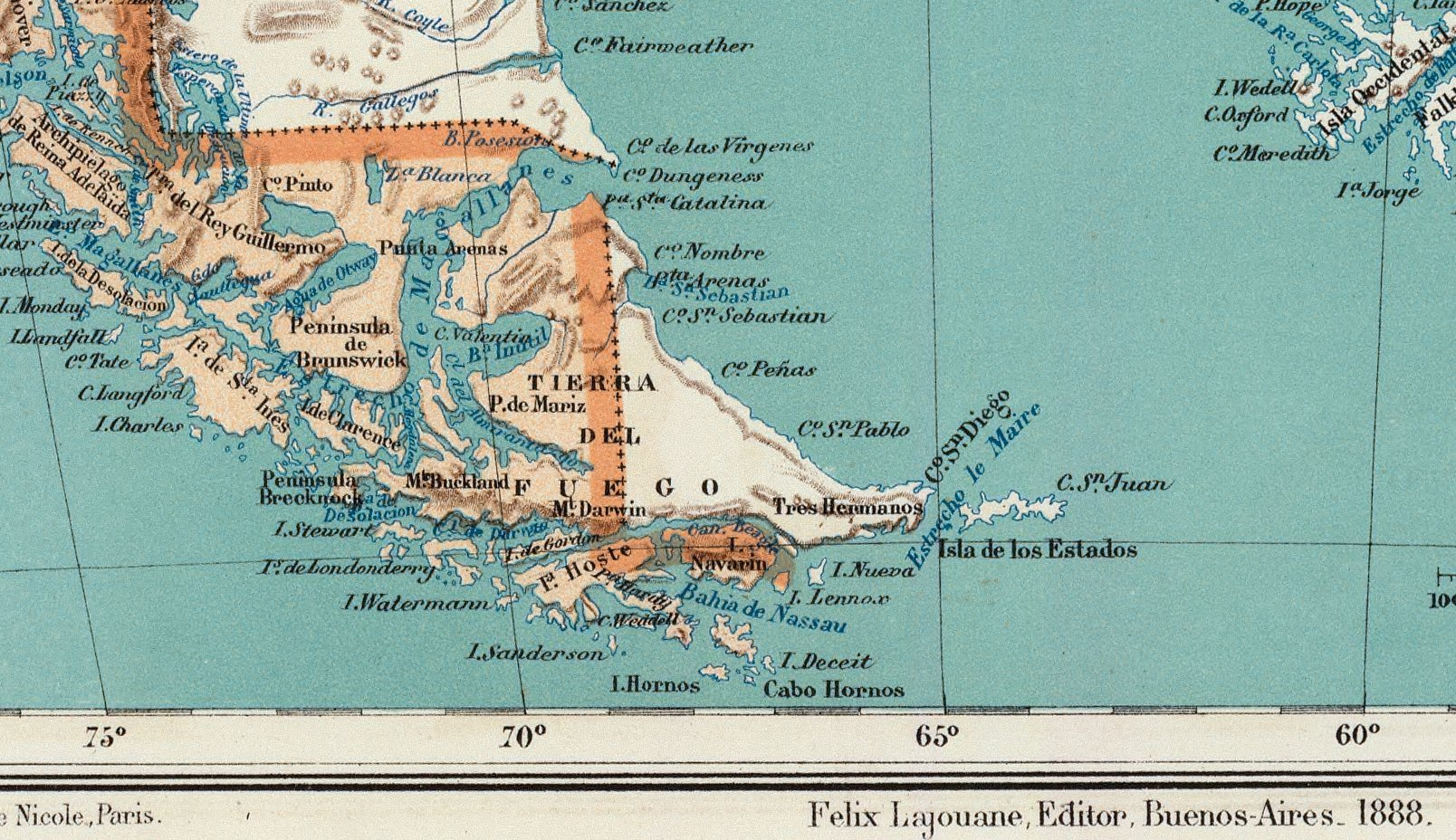

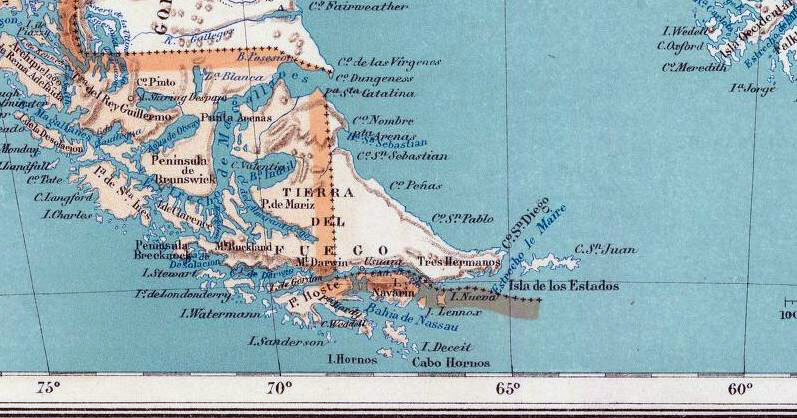

The Peruvian geographer Mariano Felipe Paz Soldán, who sought refuge in Buenos Aires during the disastrous War of the Pacific (1879–1883) between Peru and Chile, drew 1888, amongst others, two maps of Argentina:

- (above) Mapa Orohidrográfico de la República Argentina (see full size map) and
- (below) Mapa general de la República Argentina (see full size map).

The relevant sections of the maps are shown on the left side.

Soldán wrote in his Diccionario geográfico estadístico nacional argentino page 20 (1885):

En la Tierra del Fuego sirve de límite una línea que parte del Cabo de Espíritu Santo, en la lat, 52° 40', la que se prolonga hacia el S., coincidiendo con el Meridiano de los 68° 34' hasta tocar en el Canal Beagle; y pertenecen á la República Argentina todas las Islas y territorios que quedan al E. de dicha línea, y á Chile las Islas que existen al S. del Canal de Beagle, hasta el Cabo de Hornos y las que hayan al Occidente de la Tierra del Fuego; y como las Islas de Navarino, Wollaston, La Hermita, Merschel, Lennox, Picton, Isla Nueva, con otras menores, y parte de la de Hoste, están al E. del meridiano que sirve de límite, es claro que todas esas islas son Argentinas.
(trns.)
In Tierra del Fuego, a line that starts at Cabo de Espíritu Santo, on the lat, 52° 40', which extends to the S., coinciding with the Meridian of 68° 34' until it touches Beagle Channel, serves as the limit; and all the islands and territories that lie to the east of said line belong to the Argentine Republic, and to Chile the islands that exist to the south of the Beagle Channel, up to Cape Horn and those that lie to the west of Tierra del Fuego; and since the islands of Navarino, Wollaston, La Hermita, Merschel, Lennox, Picton, Isla Nueva, with other smaller ones, and part of Hoste, are to the E. of the meridian that serves as the limit, it is clear that all these islands are Argentine.

The Mapa Orohidrográfico shows the Islands Picton and Nueva as under Argentine and the island Lennox as under Chilean sovereignty. In contrast, the Mapa general shows all disputed islands as Chilean territories.

This and other turnarounds (see below) of Paz Soldáns Interpretation of the 1881 Boundary Treaty caused the Arbitral Court to discard his maps from the documentary evidence.

Other maps of Paz Soldán show the disputed islands as Chilean Territories:

- Gobernación de la Tierra del Fuego y las Islas Malvinas (see full size map) and
- Mapa de Tierra del Fuego y Malvinas (see full size map)

=== Map of the Argentine Republic and neighbouring Countries, 1889 ===
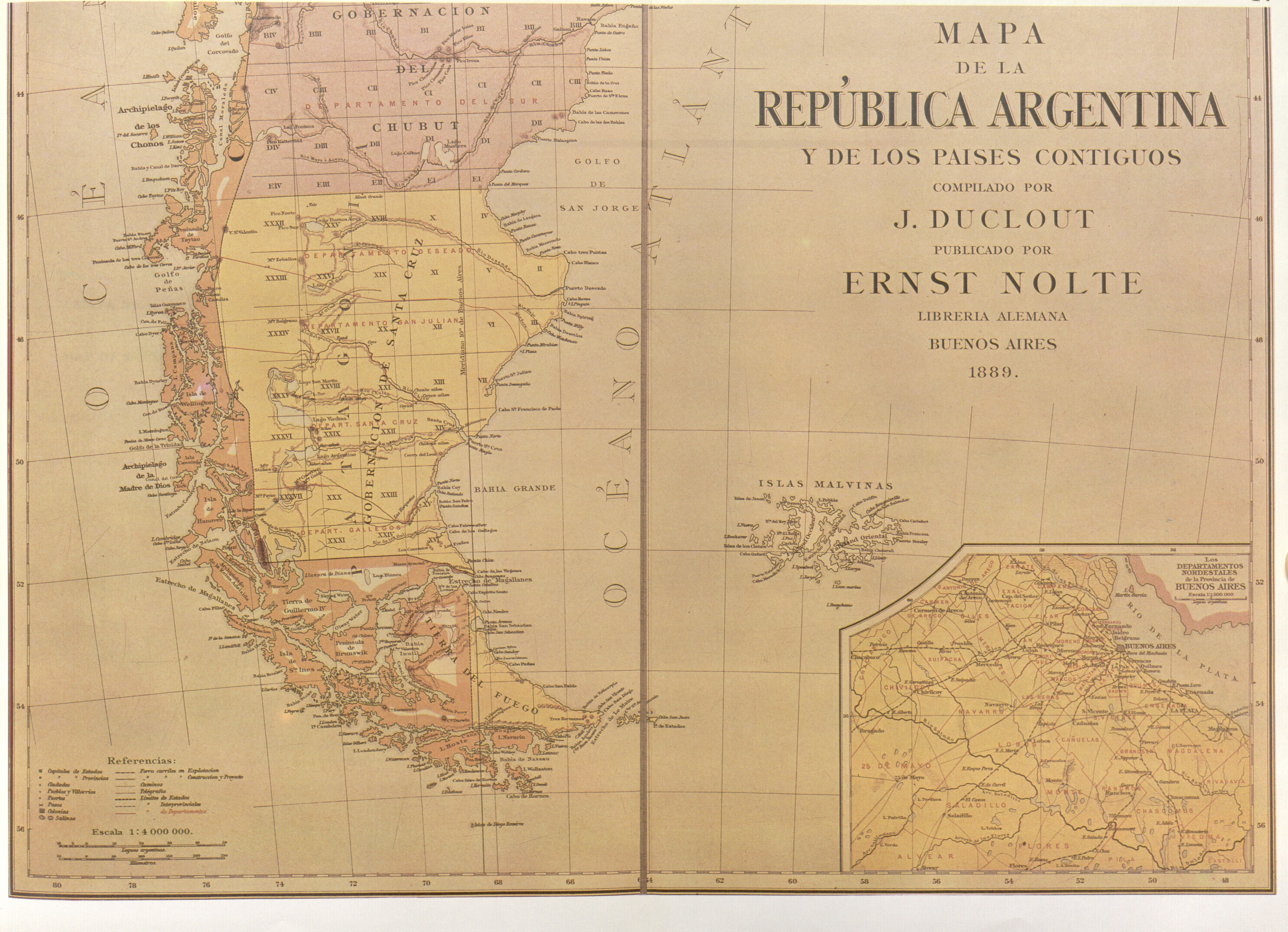

The map partially reproduced here was drawn up in Buenos Aires in 1889 by J. Duclout and published by E. Nolte.

In the southern region the international boundary is shown traced through the centre of the Beagle channel, continuing beyond the eastern mouth of the Channel, indicating Picton, Nueva and Lennox Islands and all other islands and islets extending southward as far as Cape Horn as being under Chilean sovereignty

== The Argentine change of policy ==
In the course of time became noticeable in Argentina a position that worked continuously towards a new interpretation of the Boundary Treaty. For example, in 1885 appeared a map of Mariano Paz Soldán that continued the perpendicular in the Tierra del Fuego Island forth to the Antarctic, "a fanciful line unrelated to the Treaty basis of division" as stated by the Court of Arbitration. In 1891, the Argentine Government created an "International Boundaries Office" at the Ministry of Foreign Affairs and in 1893 issued other decree providing that works on national geography already published should not be considered as officially approved unless accompanied by a statement from the Department of Foreign Affairs.

In 1889 appeared the Carte de la République Argentine as part of L'Agriculture et l'Elevage dans la République Argentine, officially sponsored for the purposes of the Argentine participation in the Paris World Exhibition of 1889. In the work of which this map was a part, the version there given of the article III of the 1881 Treaty (Argentine attribution in the Islands clause), was seriously incorrect:

...appartiendront à la République Argentine : l'île de los Estados, les îlots qui l'entourent et les autres îles de l'Atlantique au sud de la Terre de Feu et des côtes orientales de la Patagonie...

...to the Argentine Republic shall belong Staten Island, the islets that surround it, and the other Atlantic islands to the south of Tierra del Fuego and of the eastern coasts of Patagonia... (emphasis added)

instead of the original text:

...to the Argentine Republic shall belong Staten Island, the small islands next to it, and the other islands on the Atlantic to the east of Tierra del Fuego and of the eastern coast of Patagonia... (emphasis added)

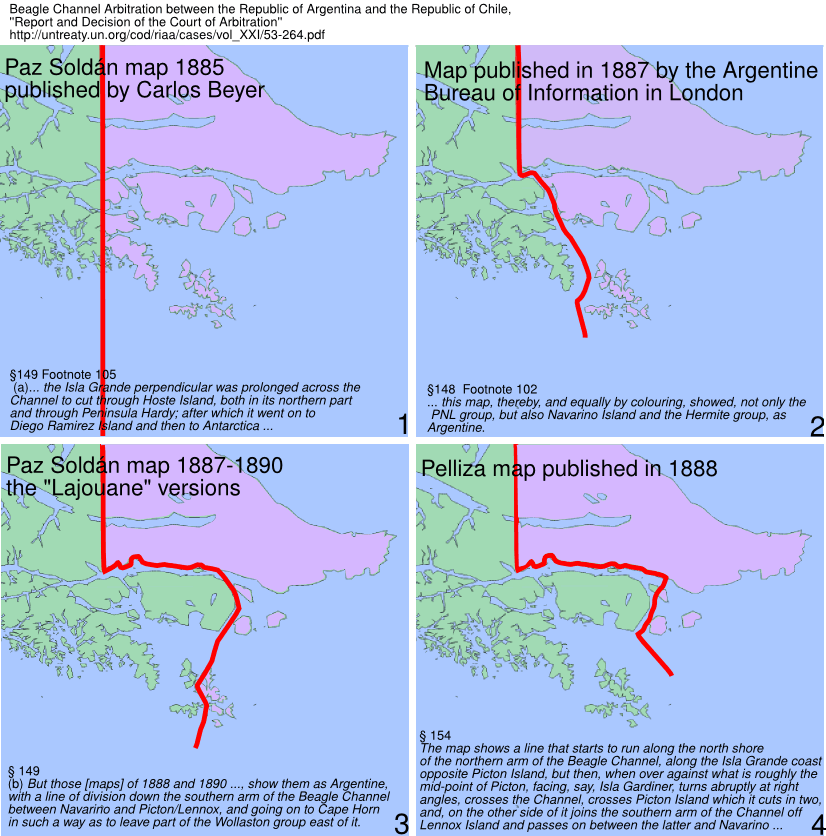
Argentine views of the 1881 Boundary Treaty

By the review of the cartography, the tribunal refused the validity of 3 in Argentina and 1 in London (by the Argentine Embassy) published maps. The maps are not disponible for now, but the court gave to every refuse a briefly map description (see text on the maps) that allowed us to rebuild the border line as showed at the left side.

In order to decide the validity of a map the court used following criterion for exclusion:

Footnote 102

This in two respects: (i) since under the first part of Article III of the Treaty, the perpendicular in the Isla Grande of Tierra del Fuego, from Cape Espíritu Santo to the Beagle Channel, was deliberately stopped there, a map showing a line of division which, by prolonging the perpendicular, crossed the Channel, and proceeded southward through the Murray Sound and past the Wollaston group, could not possibly represent the division contemplated by the Treaty; (ii) this map, thereby, and equally by colouring, showed, not only the PNL group, but also Navarino Island and the Hermite group, as Argentine. But these localities were "to the south of the Beagle Channel" according to any possible interpretation of that phrase in the Chilean attribution under the Islands clause of the Treaty.

The refused maps are:

1. Paz Soldán Map 1885, published by Carlos Beyer: This version prolonged the perpendicular to the Antarctic and was discarded: "this map, equally, showed a fanciful line unrelated to the Treaty basis of division".
2. Map published in 1887 by the Argentine Bureau of Information in London: The footnote 102 regards to this map. It was refused with the argument: "a completely fanciful line division that could have no possible warrant under the 1881 Treaty". The map was corrected by the same Bureau on its map of the next year and the corrected map is linked here.
3. The "Lajouane" versions of the Paz Soldán maps This versions were published between 1887 and 1890: altogether we know 4 different interpretations of Paz Soldán of the 1881 Treaty, see section "Two maps of Argentina, Mariano Paz Soldán, 1888", (above), and two here (left). Such turnaround lead the tribunal to the conclusion: "Two volte-faces of this kind within one five-year period – for which no explanation seems to have been offered – must throw doubt on the credibility of the whole series of Paz Soldán based maps. It also raises the question of the reason for it".
4. The Pelliza map was published 1888 and presented to the Court by Argentina as the first official Argentine map that represented the border line according to the 1881 Treaty. There were several slight different versions of this map, by some ones the border line runs over the north shore of the channel and by others on the south shore of the channel. The Court refused this maps with following words: "This result [border line], even if not absolutely underivable from any possible interpretation of the Treaty, is so eccentric that it can hardly be taken seriously".

=== First Argentine official map with a different line of the border, 1898 ===
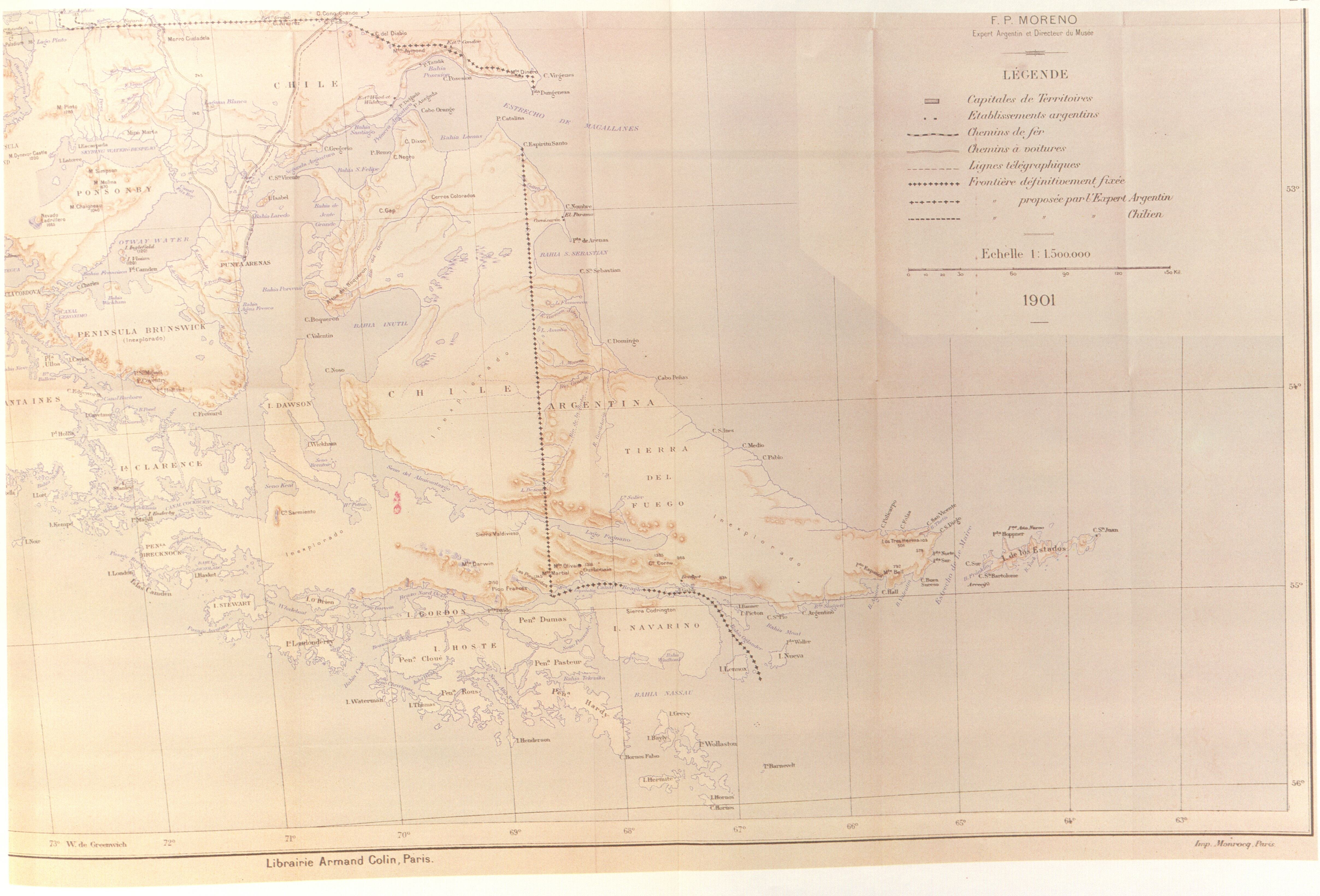

This partially reproduced map corresponds to that titled Preliminary Map of the Southern Region of the Argentine Republic which was included as No. XIV in the Argentine Evidence submitted by the Argentine Government to British Arbitration in 1898–1902. It is the first official map of Argentina showing in the area of the Beagle Channel a different frontier from the one established in the Boundary Treaty with Chile of 1881. As may be seen from the map, the boundary line deviates from the Beagle Channel towards Picton and Richmond Passages to end up between Lennox and Nueva Islands. In that way Picton and Nueva Islands appear as Argentine and Lennox Island as Chilean. The islands and islets extending southward as far as Cape Horn continue to be shown as under Chilean sovereignty. It should be recalled that there was no question concerning the territories to the south of the Magellan Strait in the British Arbitration of 1898–1902. Thus neither Chile nor Argentina made any specific reference to the boundary shown on the Argentine map reproduced here.

=== The Moat channel ===
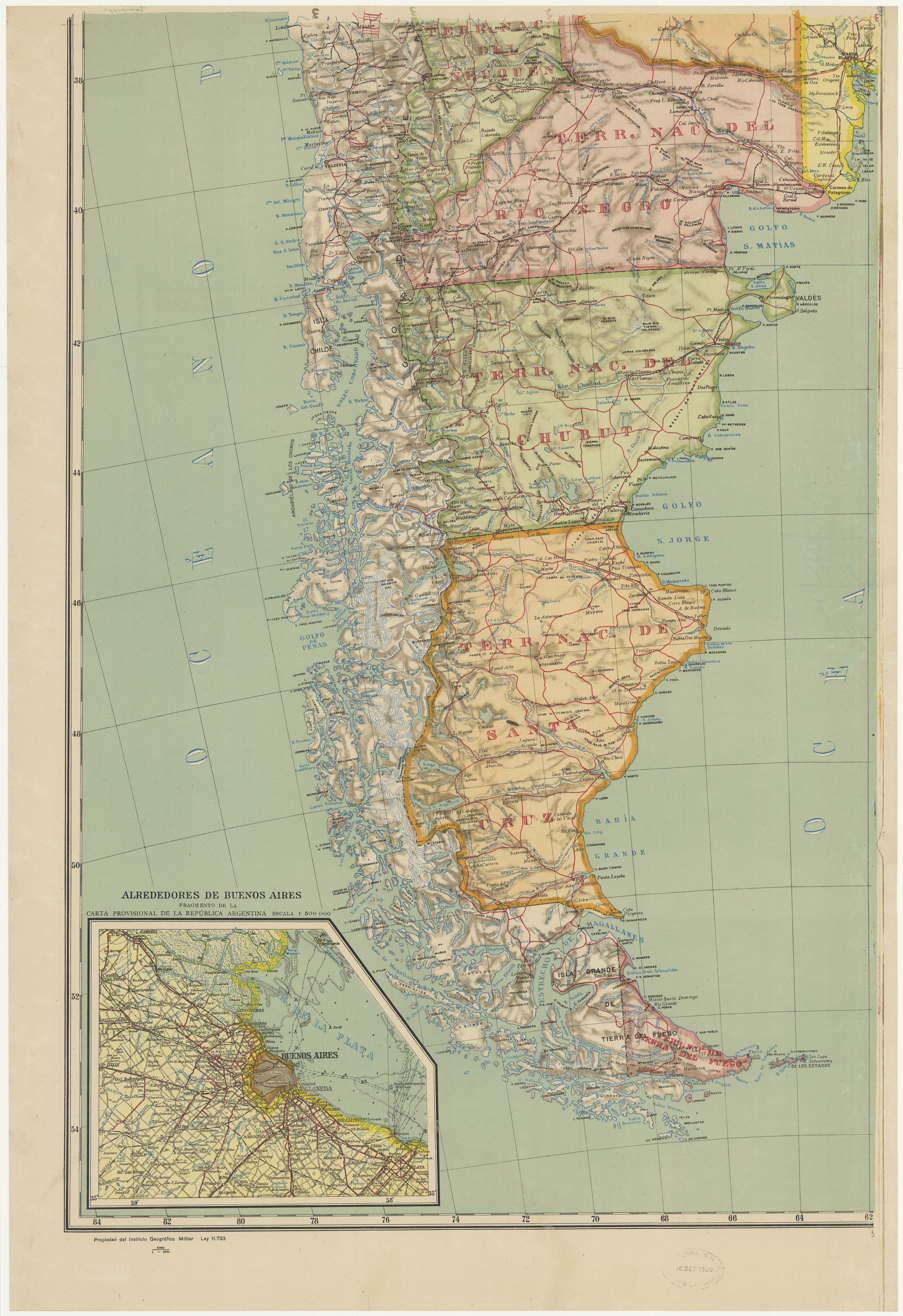

The image at the left is a section of a map published by the Instituto Geográfico Militar de Argentina in 1945 in scale 1:2.500.000 with a new "Canal Moat".

After the discovery of gold in Tierra del Fuego the Romanian adventurer Julio Popper gave a speech at the "Instituto Geográfico Argentino" (predecessor of Instituto Geográfico Militar) about a change of course of the Beagle channel. He alleged that the channel did not reach the Cape San Pío but at the "Punta Navarro" flows to the south through the Navarino and Picton islands. 1899 ordered the Argentine navy the ship ARA Almirante Brown (1880) under the command of Captain Juan P. Saenz Valiente on a hydrographic survey of the Beagle channel. The Argentine survey corroborated the Argentine thesis about the change of the Beagle and therefore the institut published 1901 new charts of the zone with a new Toponymy. They expanded the Moat-Bay (Bahía Moat), located at the shore of the Tierra del Fuego, opposite to the Picton island, to a (new) Moat channel. The new channel reached from Punta Navarro to Cabo San Pío. Consequently, the Picton, Nueva and Lennox islands became Terra Nullius, because the treaty of 1881 at this zone does not mention other islands than "south of the Beagle channel". The toponymy was disclosed to the United Kingdom and to the United States of America (the United States Hydrographic Office used the Argentine name "Moat Channel" in South America Pilot (1916) in p. 246). Chile, the immediate neighbour was not informed and was advised of the new names only 1904 through new charts of the zone edited by the US. Segundo R. Storni, then Leutnant later (1943) Foreign Ministers of Argentina legitimated the modifications:

The word "Bay" hasn't a precise signification and the configuration of the region inclines the meaning to a channel, so it is a logical modification. But we recognize that it wasn't absolutely necessary

— Rafael Santibañez Escobar, Los derechos de Chile en el Beagle

A Soviet map of the Beagle Channel used the Argentine toponyme "Moat Channel" in 1967. See Sowjet map 1967.

The new name didn't prevail and disappeared into oblivion. The Treaty of Peace and Friendship of 1984 between Chile and Argentina mention (only) the Beagle channel.

=== The southern regions of the Republics of Argentina and Chile, 1904 ===
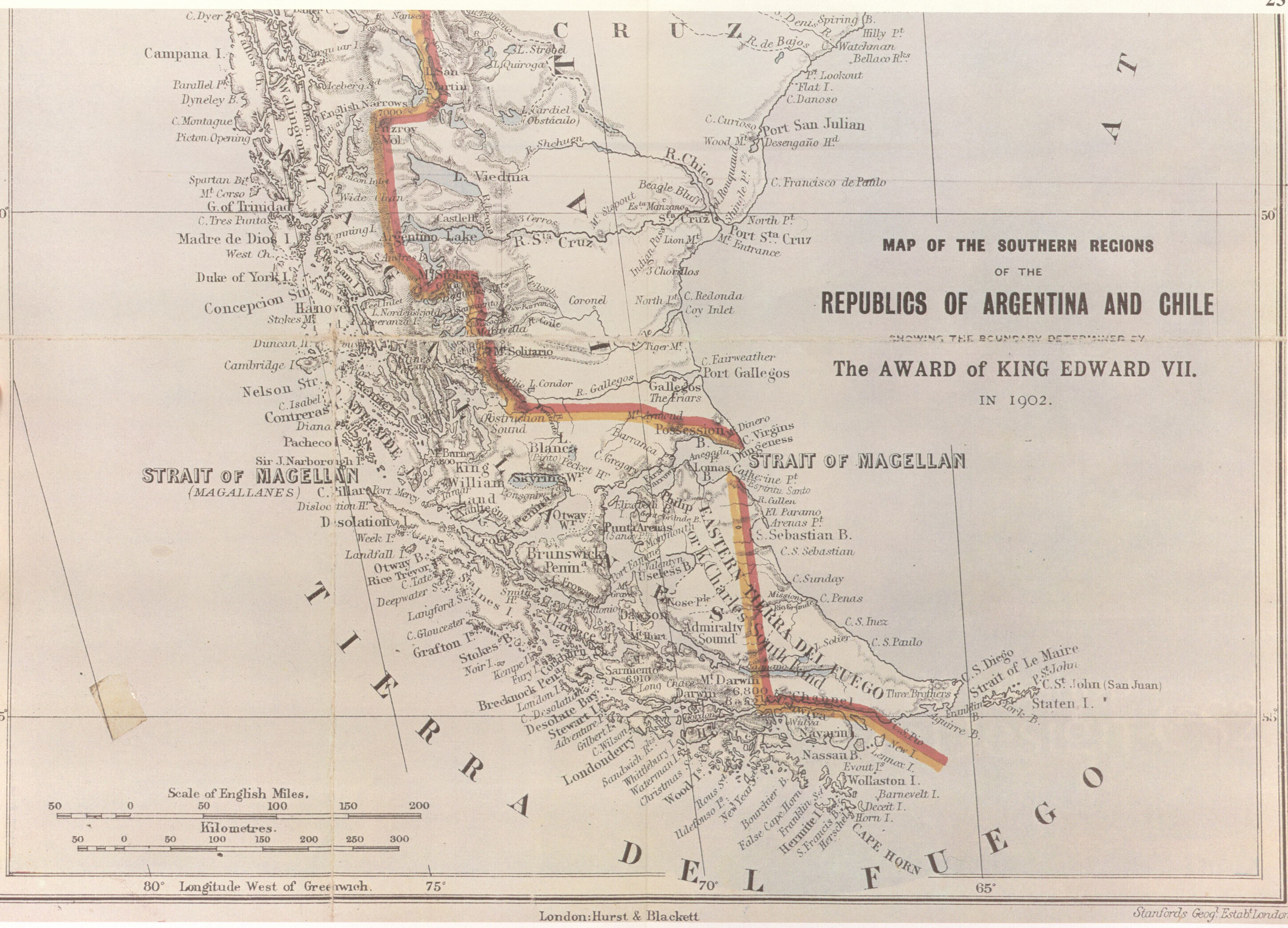

This map, whose southern part is reproduced here, is included in Col. Sir Thomas Holdich's work "The Countries of the King's Award" written immediately after his work on the British Arbitration in 1898–1902. After the British Arbitral Award of 1902 and during the course of the work marking out the frontier line indicated therein, Holdich visited the Beagle Channel zone which was not included in the arbitration. In the Beagle Channel region the map marks the international boundary as passing through the latter up to beyond its eastern mouth. Picton, Nueva and Lennox Islands and all the other islands extending southwards as far as Cape Horn are shown as under Chilean sovereignty.

Other Europeans maps showing the same zone:

- Stieler Handatlas 1889
- La grande Encyclopedie 1890
- Stieler Handatlas 1891
- Atlante Mondiale Hoepli 1899

=== Map of the Argentine Army, 1905 ===
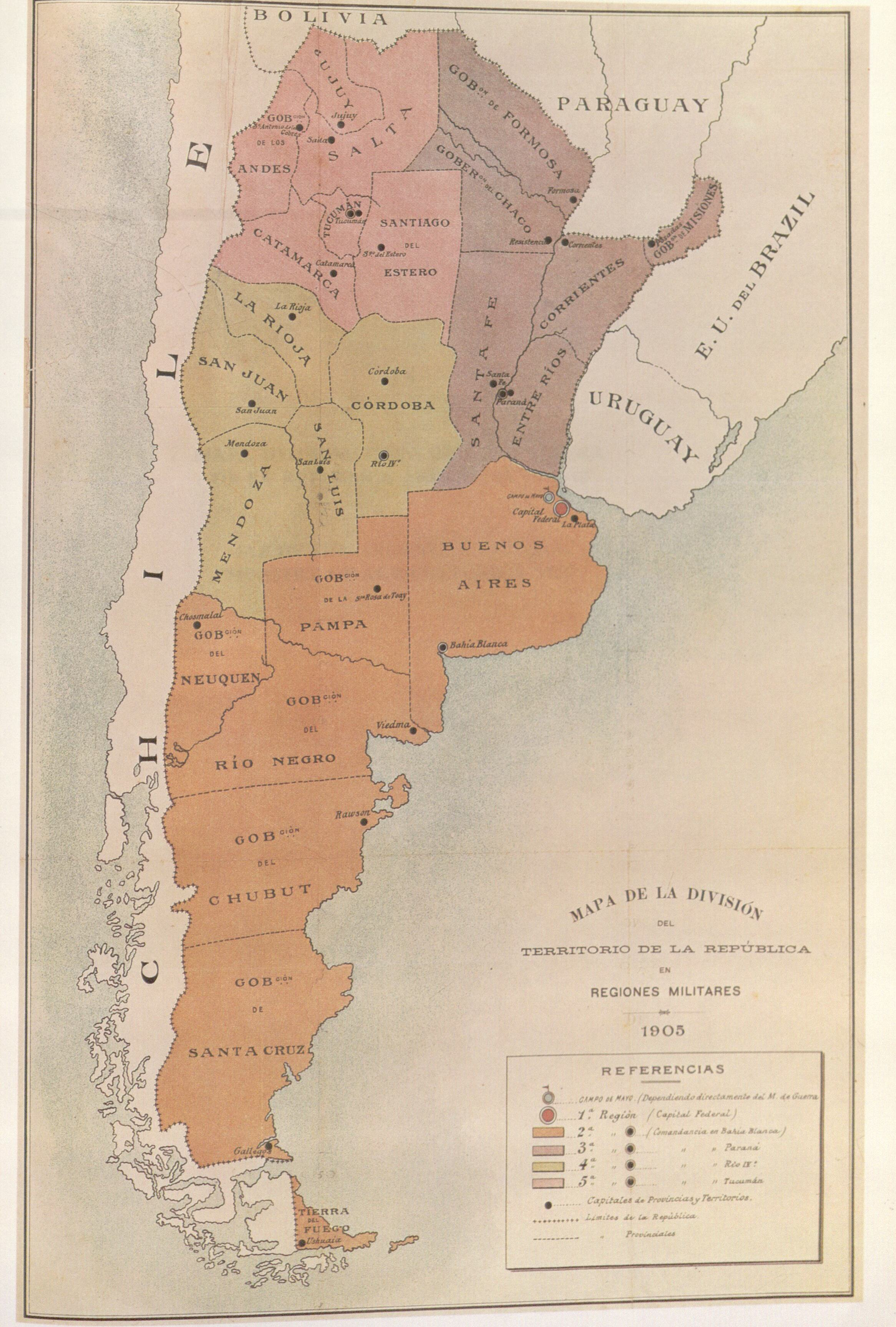

This reproduction of the "Map of the division of the Argentine territory into Military regions 1905" was included in the Military Bulletin of the Argentine Ministry of War, Year IV, vol. I, 1 May 1905, No. 140. The Argentine military regions are distinguished by different colours, all territories located south of the Beagle Channel as far as Cape Horn have been omitted and thus understood to be under Chilean sovereignty.

=== "Nuevo Mapa de la República Argentina". Oficina de Cartografía Argentina, 1914 ===
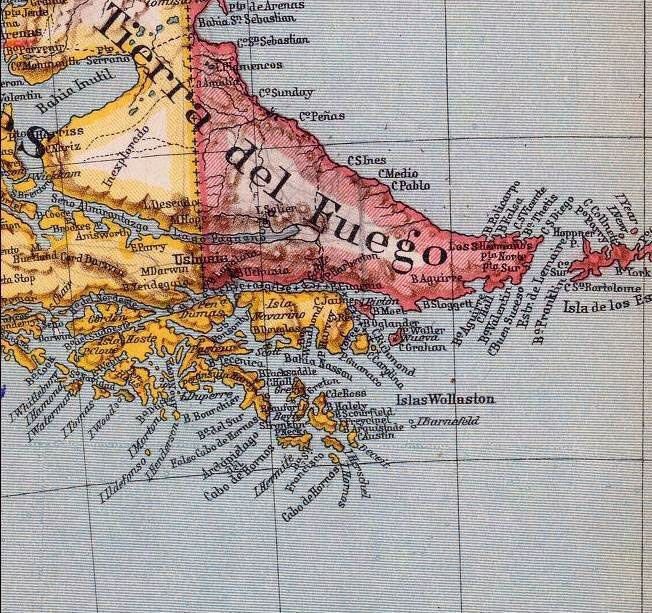

Partial reproduction of the "Nuevo Mapa de la República Argentina", 1914, prepared by Pablo Ludwig. The complete map is under Nuevo mapa de la República Argentina (1914). In the map Picton and Nueva appear under Argentine, Lennox under Chilean sovereignty.

=== Sheet Ushuaia from "Instituto Geográfico Militar de Argentina", 1967 ===
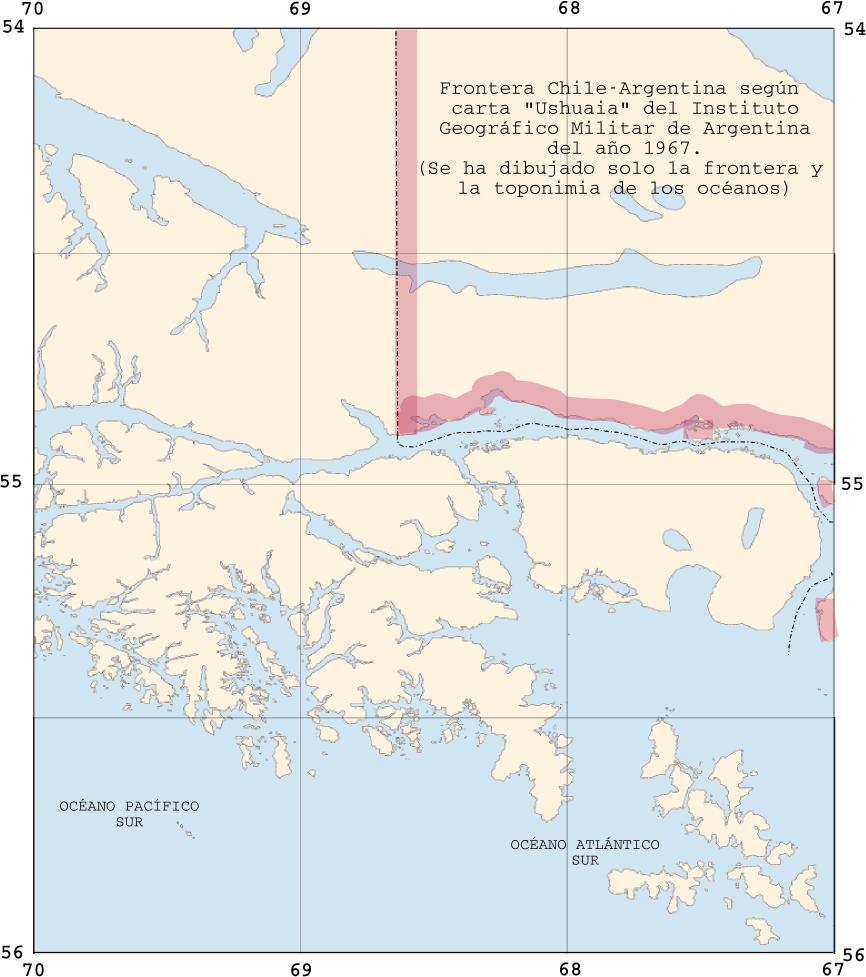

Rebuild of the sheet Ushuaia from the es:Instituto Geográfico Militar (Argentina), 1967 edition. Only the borderline and the oceanic Toponymy are copied from the copyrighted original. A similar map was issued in 1948.

The international boundary shown in the Beagle Channel zone corresponds to the Argentine claim in the area which the arbitral decision of 18 April 1977 put a definitive end. Nueva Island is not shown on the map, and Picton and Lennox Islands are partially shown, coloured as belonging to the Argentine Republic. Nevertheless, all the other islands and islets extending southward as far as Cape Horn figure as under Chilean sovereignty.

In the official Argentine map the geographic nomenclature "OCÉANO ATLÁNTICO SUR" (South Atlantic Ocean) appears inserted to the south of Hoste Island and in the western region of Wollaston and Hermite Islands, in other words more than one degree longitude west of Cape Horn, thus contradicting the (1978) Argentine thesis concerning the ocean toponymy in the region of the extreme south of America, that the Cape Horn was the border between the Pacific and Atlantic Ocean. The reason could be that in 1938 the Argentine delegation to the Hydrographic Conference in Oslo tried to define the meridian 68° 43'W (through the Chilean Diego Ramírez Islands) as limit between the Pacific and Atlantic oceans.

== Post arbitration maps ==
During the Proceso de Reorganización Nacional (1976–1983) and based on concepts of territorial nationalism and geopolitics Argentine geography sustained the possession of the islands as a "vital issue" and called on to a "march to the south" in order to follow some kind of Argentine Manifest Destiny:

Classical geopolitics [thoughts] of the late nineteenth century, the crudest biological metaphors of geographic determinism, militarism, the principles of the Doctrina de la Seguridad Nacional and the corporative nationalism can be noted, concealed, subtly or in plain language in the manifests, conferences and statements of the geographers

— Geografía, guerra y nacionalismo. La Sociedad Argentina de Estudios Geográficos (GAEA) en las encrucijadas patrióticas del gobierno militar, 1976–1983.

The Beagle conflict, the Falklands dispute and the question of the use of the Rio de la Plata Basin became through the works of the geographic topics of popular interests and opinion.

=== Book of Admiral Isaac Francisco Rojas approved by the Argentine Ministry of Education, 1979 ===
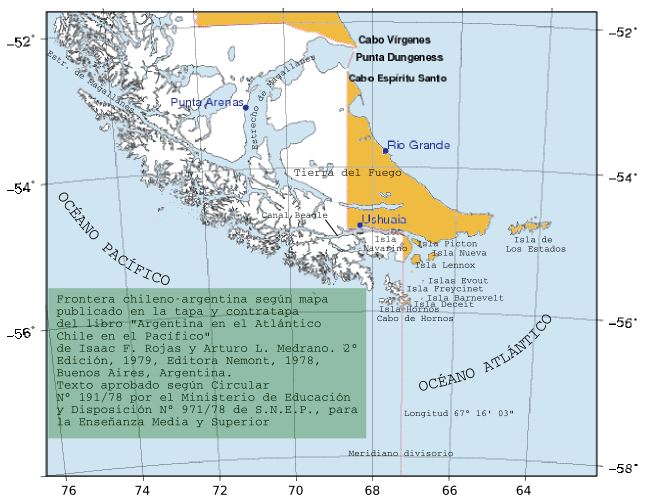

This image shows a facsimile of the map appeared in the cover of the book compiled by of Admiral (R) Isaac Rojas, former vice-president of Argentina and former Chief of the Argentine Navy, and Arturo Medrano "Argentina en el Atlántico Chile en el Pacífico". It is approved by the Argentine Ministry of Education for teaching in schools and high schools.

The book justifies, as they say, the Argentine claim over the islands. Not only Picton, Nueva, Lennox and all islands east from Cape Horn meridian are Argentine Territories but also the east side of Navarino Island with the Chilean village of Puerto Toro appears under Argentine sovereignty.

=== Argentine stamp, 1983 ===
After the Falklands War, on the postage stamp issued in 1983 Cape Horn island was labeled as Argentinian, and the islands of Picton, Lennox and Nueva at the eastern entrance to the Beagle Channel are shaded like Argentina.

=== Argentine Passport 2011 ===
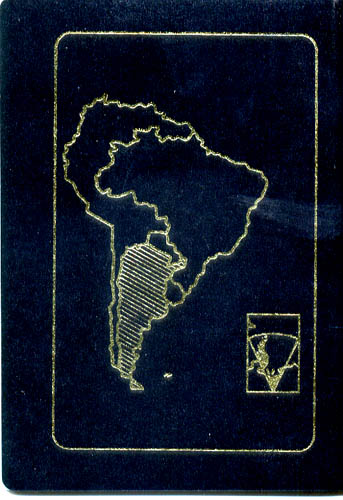

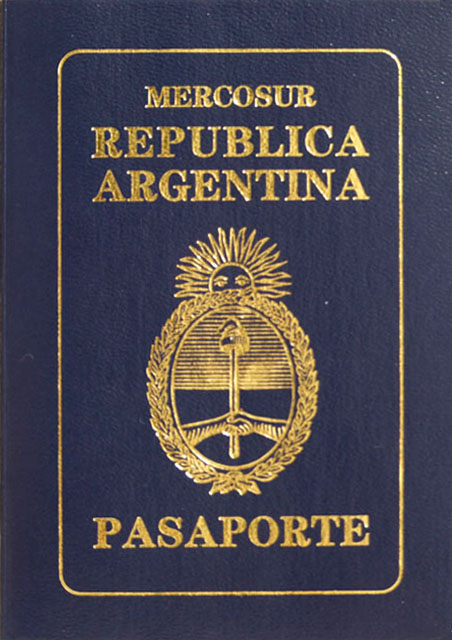

A map of South America appears on the back of Argentine passports, showing the country's location within the continent and within Mercosur, together with the Argentine Antarctic Claim and the Falkland Islands as part of Argentina. Most of the Chilean Magallanes Region disappeared, included the Strait of Magellan, the Chilean part of Tierra del Fuego and all islands south of the Beagle Channel.

== Analysis ==
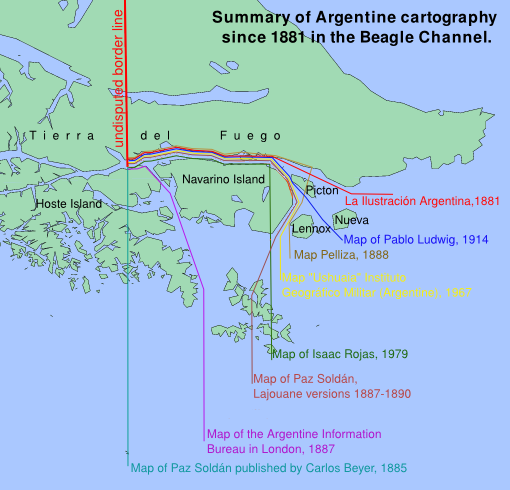
Different Argentine Interpretations of the 1881 Boundary Treaty. The red line of "La Ilustración Argentina", chronological the first one and the Chilean one, is currently valid

The contrast could hardly be starker between the multiple Argentine views and the sole Chilean view of the 1881 Boundary Treaty. The interpretation of the 1881 Boundary Treaty seems to have challenged to the limit the fantasy and intelligence of the Argentine cartography as of 1888, for they found more than 8 different border lines from the same text. Anyway, in his Report and Decision on 18 April 1977 the Court of Arbitration judged:

There can be no doubt that in the immediate post-Treaty period, that is to say from 1881 to at least 1887/88, Argentine cartography in general showed the PNL group as Chilean;

— §148

Argentine scientists Carlos Escudé and Andrés Cisneros in Historia general de las relaciones exteriores de la República Argentina give a résumé of the Boundary Treaty of 1881:

Una serie de documentos prueban que la intención tanto de los firmantes del tratado de 1881 como de la clase política y los gobiernos argentinos entre 1881 y 1902 fue la de otorgar dichas islas a Chile.

(English:)

A series of documents prove that the purpose of the subscriber of the 1881 Treaty as well the Argentine political class and the Argentine governments from 1881 to 1902 was to grant the islands to Chile.

The same opinion shares the authors Karl Hernekamp, Annegret I. Haffa and Andrea Wagner.

== See also ==
- Falkland Islands sovereignty dispute
- Falklands War

== Bibliography ==
- Beagle Channel Arbitration between the Republic of Argentina and the Republic of Chile, Report and Decision of the Court of Arbitration
- Escudé, Carlos and Cisneros, Andrés, Historia de las Relaciones Exteriores Argentinas, archived from the original , in Spanish Language.
- Ministerio de Relaciones Exteriores de Chile: Relaciones Chileno–Argentinas, La controversia del Beagle. Genf, Switzerland, 1979, English and Spanish Language
- Text of the Peace and Friendship Treaty of 1984, Copy to the United Nations, English Language
- Mateo Martinic, Cartografía Magallánica 1523–1945, ISBN 956-7189-07-2, Ediciones de la Universidad de Magallanes, 1999
