= 1977 Beagle Channel arbitration =

1977 Beagle Channel arbitration.

On 22 July 1971 Salvador Allende and Alejandro Agustín Lanusse, the Presidents of Chile and Argentina, signed an arbitration agreement (the Arbitration Agreement of 1971). This agreement related to their dispute over the territorial and maritime boundaries between them, and in particular the title to the Picton, Nueva and Lennox islands near the extreme end of the American continent, which was submitted to binding arbitration under the auspices of the United Kingdom government.

On 2 May 1977 the court ruled that the islands belonged to Chile (see the Report and decision of the Court of Arbitration). On 25 January 1978 Argentina repudiated the arbitration decision and on 22 December 1978 started (and a few hours later aborted) military action to invade both those islands and continental Chile.

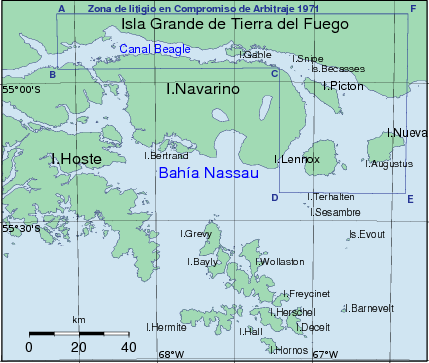
The Hammer ABCDEF. 1978 Argentina claimed also territories east of the Cape Horn.

== The court ==
The British Crown had previously in 1902 and 1966 acted as arbitrator between Chile and Argentina (see Arbitration 1902 here), but on this occasion the statutory framework of the Arbitration was different.

The Arbitration Agreement of 1971 stipulated:

- the names of the five judges appointed (see the preamble of the Arbitration Agreement):
  - Hardy Cross Dillard (United States of America)
  - Gerald Fitzmaurice (United Kingdom)
  - André Gros (France)
  - Charles D. Onyeama (Nigeria)
  - Sture Petrén (Sweden)
- the region where the court was to define the borderline (A polygon ABCDEF, known as "Hammer", see paragraph 4 of Article 1 of the Arbitration Agreement)
- that the final decision would be submitted to the British Crown, which was then to recommend acceptance or rejection of the award of the court but not to modify it (Article XIII of the Arbitration Agreement)
- that the Court of Arbitration should reach its conclusions in accordance with the principles of international law.
- that each of the Parties should defray its own expenses and one half of the expenses of the Court of Arbitration and of Her Britannic Majesty's Government in relation to the Arbitration.

In this way the United Kingdom did not have any influence on the judgement: the procedure, the legal framework, the judges and the matter in dispute had all been defined by both countries.

== Procedure ==
The procedure had four phases:

1. The Memorials (starting from 1 January 1973) in terms of the delivery of written pleadings, annexes and maps.
2. The Counter-Memorials (starting from 2 June 1974) in terms of the responses.
3. The Replies (starting from 1 June 1975) in terms of comments.
4. The Oral proceedings (starting from 7 November 1975 to 23. October 1976) in terms of oral statements that were made in English or French at the speaker's choice, a simultaneous translation into English being provided in the latter case.

Chile handed over to the Court 14 volumes and 213 maps, and Argentina 12 volumes and 195 maps.

During the first fortnight of March 1976, the Court, accompanied by the Registrar and Liaison Officers from both sides, visited the Beagle Channel region, and inspected the islands and waterways concerned, first on the Chilean Naval Transport Vessel "Aquiles", and then on the Argentine Naval Transport Vessel "ARA Bahia Aguirre".

== Arguments ==
In the border treaty of 1855 Chile and Argentina had agreed to retain the borders of the Spanish colonial administration. This principle, known in jurisprudence as Uti possidetis, served two purposes: the first was to divide the territory between the two countries, and the second to preclude the creation of Res nullius areas that could have been taken in possession by other powers (such as the United States of America, the UK or France – although the Beagle Channel had been unknown until 1830 and there had been no Spanish settlements south of Chiloé).

The boundary treaty of 1881 described, without any map, the course of the 5600 km border as follows:

- over the Andes mountains (from north to parallel 52°S: 'the highest peaks that divide the waters') (Article I),
- in the region north of and through the Strait of Magellan (mainly along the 52°S parallel) (Article II) and
- in the Tierra del Fuego-Beagle Channel region (Article III).

The controversial articles II and III of the 1881 treaty were:

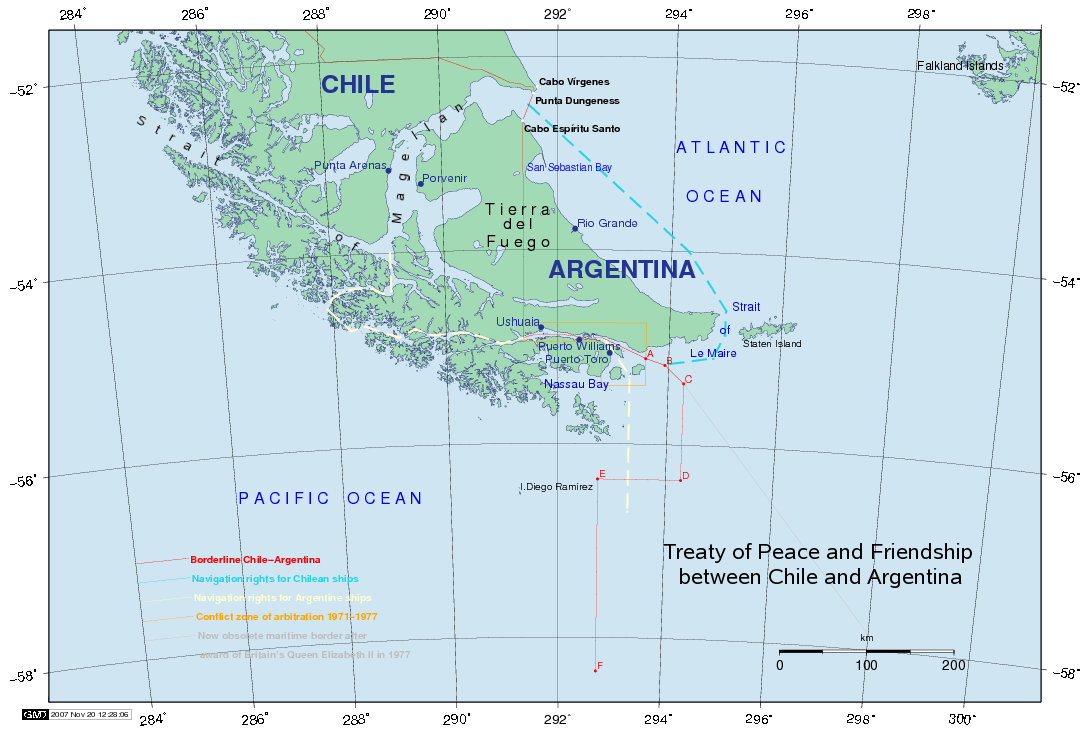
Present frontier. There was until 1881 mutual agreement about the border line from the 52°S parallel to the north shore of the Beagle Channel. From the Beagle Channel to Cape Horn it was determined by the Award of 1977 and the Treaty of 1984

Article II)
"In the southern part of the continent, and to the north of the Straits of Magellan, the boundary between the two countries shall be a line, which starting from Point Dungeness, shall be prolonged overland as far as Mount Dinero; thence it shall continue westward, following the highest elevations of the chain of hills existing there, until it strikes the height of Mount Aymont. From this point the line shall be prolonged up to the intersection of meridian 70° W., with parallel 52° S. and thence it shall continue westward coinciding with this latter parallel as far as the divortium aquarum of the Andes. The territories lying to the north of said line shall belong to the Argentine Republic, and to Chili those that extend to the south, without prejudice to the provisions of Art. 3d concerning Tierra del Fuego and the adjacent islands".

Article III)
"In Tierra del Fuego a line shall be drawn, which starting from the point called Cape Espiritu Santo in parallel 52°40, shall be prolonged to the south along the meridian 68°34 west of Greenwich until it touches Beagle Channel. Tierra del Fuego, divided in this manner, shall be Chilean on the western side and Argentine on the eastern. As for the islands, to the Argentine Republic shall belong Staten Island, the small islands next to it, and the other islands there may be on the Atlantic to the east of Tierra del Fuego and of the eastern coast of Patagonia; and to Chile shall belong all the islands to the south of Beagle Channel up to Cape Horn, and those there may be to the west of Tierra del Fuego".

Under the so-called oceanic principle Argentina believed that the uti possidetis doctrine operated such that, under the arrangements operated by the colonial administrations, Chile (then the Captaincy General of Chile) had no territorial waters in the Atlantic Ocean and the Argentine (then the Viceroyalty of the Río de la Plata) could not have territorial waters in the Pacific Ocean. The Argentine saw a reaffirmation of this principle in the Protocols of 1902, according to Rizzo Romano the first arms control pact in the world, under which both countries agreed that the Chilean navy should have enough ships to defend the interests of Chile in the Pacific, and the Argentine navy should have enough ships to defend the interests of Argentina in the Atlantic. Chile doesn't consider the 1902 protocol as a border treaty and the word Pacific doesn't appear in the Boundary treaty, and hence claimed that the boundary between the Pacific and the Atlantic had never been defined.

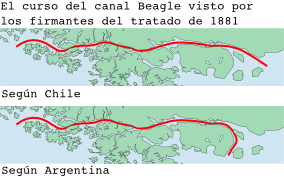
Two views over the Beagle Channel as seen by the signatories of the Treaty of 1881. Above the Chilean view, below the Argentine view

To resolve the conflicting interests of both countries, they decided in 1881 on an agreement; but nearly a century later there was still no mutual understanding of what that agreement had consisted of. Chile maintained it had only renounced rights to eastern Patagonia (today continental south Argentina) to obtain full possession of the Strait of Magellan, but Argentina believed Chile received the Strait of Magellan in return for renouncing all coasts bordering the Atlantic Ocean.

About the course of the Beagle Channel there were discrepancies. The eastern end of the Channel can be seen as a delta with an east-west arm and a north-south arm (around Navarino Island). The channel specified in the border treaty of 1881 was seen by Chile as the east-west arm, but by Argentina as the north-south arm. Following this controversy, two clauses were in dispute: Chile argued the Channel clause (... to Chile shall belong all the islands to the south of Beagle Channel up to Cape Horn,...), while Argentina the Atlantic clause (... the other islands there may be on the Atlantic to the east of Tierra del Fuego ...). Some Chileans argued that the text "until it touches the Beagle Channel" in article III meant that Argentina had no navigable waters in the Beagle Channel, although this interpretation was not supported by the Chilean claim.

== The judgement ==
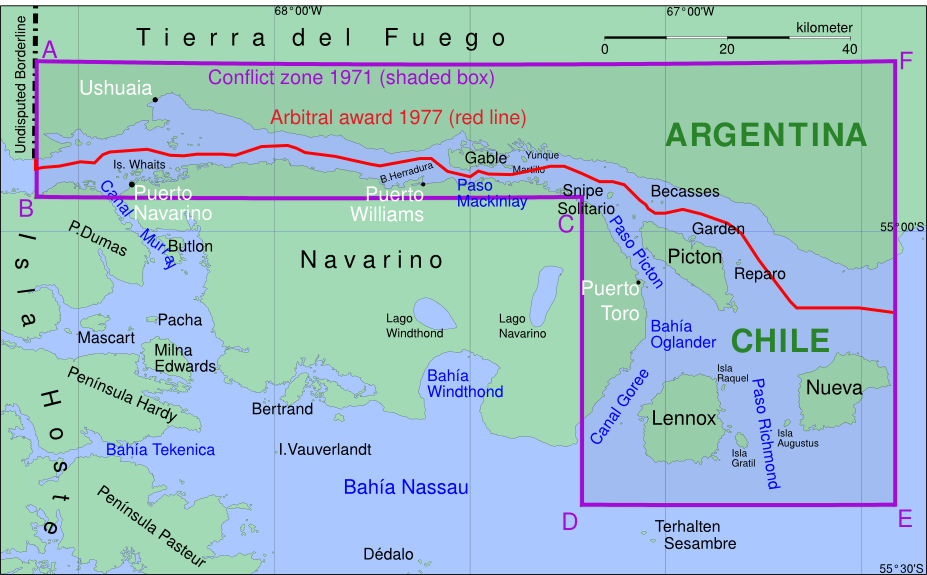
Borderline (red line) through the Beagle Channel according to the arbitral award

A unanimous judgement was handed over to Queen Elizabeth II on 18 April 1977. The French judge André Gros gave a dissenting vote, not concerning the result but the reason. On 2 May 1977 the judgement was announced to the governments of both countries.

It involved the border running approximately along the center of the Channel, and awarded both Chile and Argentina sovereignty over navigable waters in the Channel:

"the Court considers it as amounting to an overriding general principle of law that, in absence of express provision to the contrary, an attribution of territory must ipso facto carry with it the waters appurtenant to the territory attributed" (§107 Report and Decision of the Court of Arbitration).

Whaits Island, the islets called Snipe, Eugenia, Solitario, Hermanos, Gardiner and Reparo, and the bank known as Herradura were awarded to Chile. All of these lie near the southern bank of the Beagle Channel.

Argentina was awarded all islands, islets and rocks near the north coast of the channel: Bridges, Eclaireurs, Gable, Becasses, Martillo and Yunque.

At the eastern end of the channel, the judgement recognized the sovereignty of Chile over the Picton, Nueva and Lennox islands and all their adjacent islets and rocks.

The territorial waters established by these coasts, according to international maritime law, established Chilean rights in the Atlantic Ocean.

The Court sentenced also:

1. the 1881 treaty had given Chile exclusive control of the strait (§ 31)
2. the waters of the strait were likewise Chilean since Chile controls both shores (§37)
3. the Chilean Point Dungenes is on the Atlantic (§24)
4. the 1893 Protocol had not altered the basic nature of the 1881 treaty compromise (§74)

== The reasons of the court ==
The court rejected both the uti possidetis principle and the oceanic principle because:

«...In the particular case of the 1881 Treaty no useful purpose would be served by attempting to resolve doubts or conflicts regarding the Treaty, merely by referring to the very same principle or doctrine, the uncertain effect of which in the territorial relations between the Parties, had itself caused the Treaty to be entered into, as constituting the only (and intendedly final) means of resolving this uncertainty. To proceed in such a manner would merely be to enter a circulus inextricabilis....»

The tribunal considered that the exchange of Patagonia for the Strait of Magellan was the transaction behind the 1881 treaty:

«...This [Patagonia] was what Chile conceded by giving up a claim that still had enough vitality and content, at least politically, to make its final abandonment of primary importance to Argentina. It is on this basis, as well as on the actual attribution of Patagonian territory to Argentina effected by Article II of the Treaty, that the Court reaches the conclusion that it was the antithesis Patagonia/Magellan, rather than Magellan/Atlantic, which constituted the fundamental element of the Treaty settlement....»

After careful consideration of all possible word meanings and interpretations of the text, the court refused the Atlantic clause:

«...The Argentine interpretation depends on subjecting the text to a process, not exactly of amendment, but of what is known as emendation, i.e. adjustment to accommodate a different outlook. This is in no way an illegitimate proceeding as such, —but its acceptability in any given case must depend on how compelling are the reasons that operate to support it, and also on the degree of adjustment entailed. The following are the adaptations that would be required:...»

== The reaction to the judgement ==
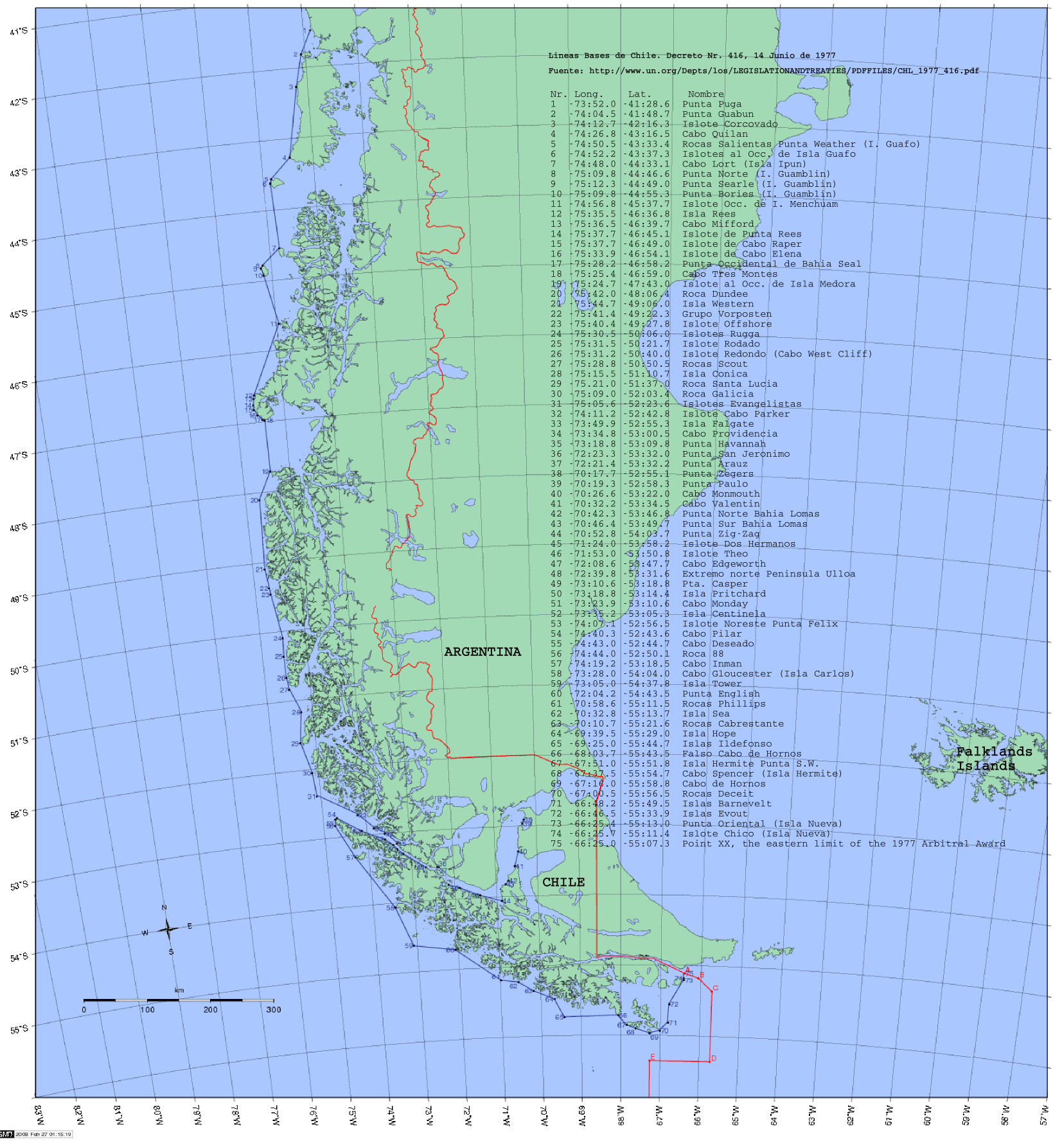
Baselines of Chile on the map

Chile accepted the judgement immediately and enacted it into its domestic law on 14 June 1977 (decree n°416 over the base lines).

On 25 January 1978 Argentina repudiated the arbitration award. According to Argentina:

1. the Argentine argument had been distorted and misrepresented.
2. the judgement had covered topics outside its terms of reference
3. the Court had drawn contradictory conclusions.
4. the Court had made errors of interpretation.
5. the Court had made geographical and historical errors.
6. the Court had not properly balanced the arguments and evidence of each party.

It has been argued that the Argentine claims over the Beagle Channel could not be sustained from a legal point of view and that in practice many of their assertions were subjective.

== Aftermath ==
The court awarded navigable waters on the north bank of the eastern part of the Channel to Argentina, but otherwise it met all Chilean claims. Although the arbitration concerned only small islands, the direction of the new demarcation of the frontier would under international maritime law give Chile significant rights running into the Atlantic Ocean, and would also significantly reduce the claims of Argentina on the Antarctic continent and its waters.

The Argentine rejection led both countries to the verge of war. On 22 December 1978 Argentina started military action to invade the islands. Only last minute papal mediation prevented the outbreak of armed conflict. The award was a defeat for Argentine foreign policy and initiated an uncoupling from the international community.

The arbitration was completely separate from the Falkland Islands issue, a fact that is often obfuscated or publicly denied in Argentina, where the arbitration is often presented as a plot by the UK.

Pablo Lacoste in his work "La disputa por el Beagle y el papel de los actores no estatales argentinos" (Argentine Civil Society Agencies in the Beagle Dispute) says:

The Argentine newspaper Clarin wished to show that the UK government had taken a substantive role in the arbitration, so that it could be criticized as biased in this by its own dispute with Argentina over the Falklands. To buttress this suggestion, on 3 May 1977, just as the arbitration award was announced, the newspaper put on its front page a cartoon of Queen Elizabeth II eating a Cap of Liberty, an Argentine emblem. Note that the same monarch had resolved the Palena and California controversies [i.e. other border disputes between Chile and Argentina] ten years previously, and that the Argentine government had accepted those decisions – but that in 1977 the Argentine press did not mention these precedents.

Chile kept in mind the Argentine breach of the arbitration agreement.

The award brought the military dictatorships on both sides to the border to a unique and paradoxical situation: in Chile they celebrated the "wise" decision of the (overthrown) enemy Allende, and in Argentina they criticized the "imprudent" decision of his former colleague in power, general Lanusse.

The award was later fully recognized by Argentina in the Peace and Friendship Treaty of 1984.

== See also ==
- Alto Palena–Encuentro River dispute (1966 Arbitral Award by Queen Elizabeth II)
- Falklands War
- Argentina-Chile relations
- Foreign relations of Argentina
- Foreign relations of Chile
