= Argentina–Chile relations =

- Argentina: Chile

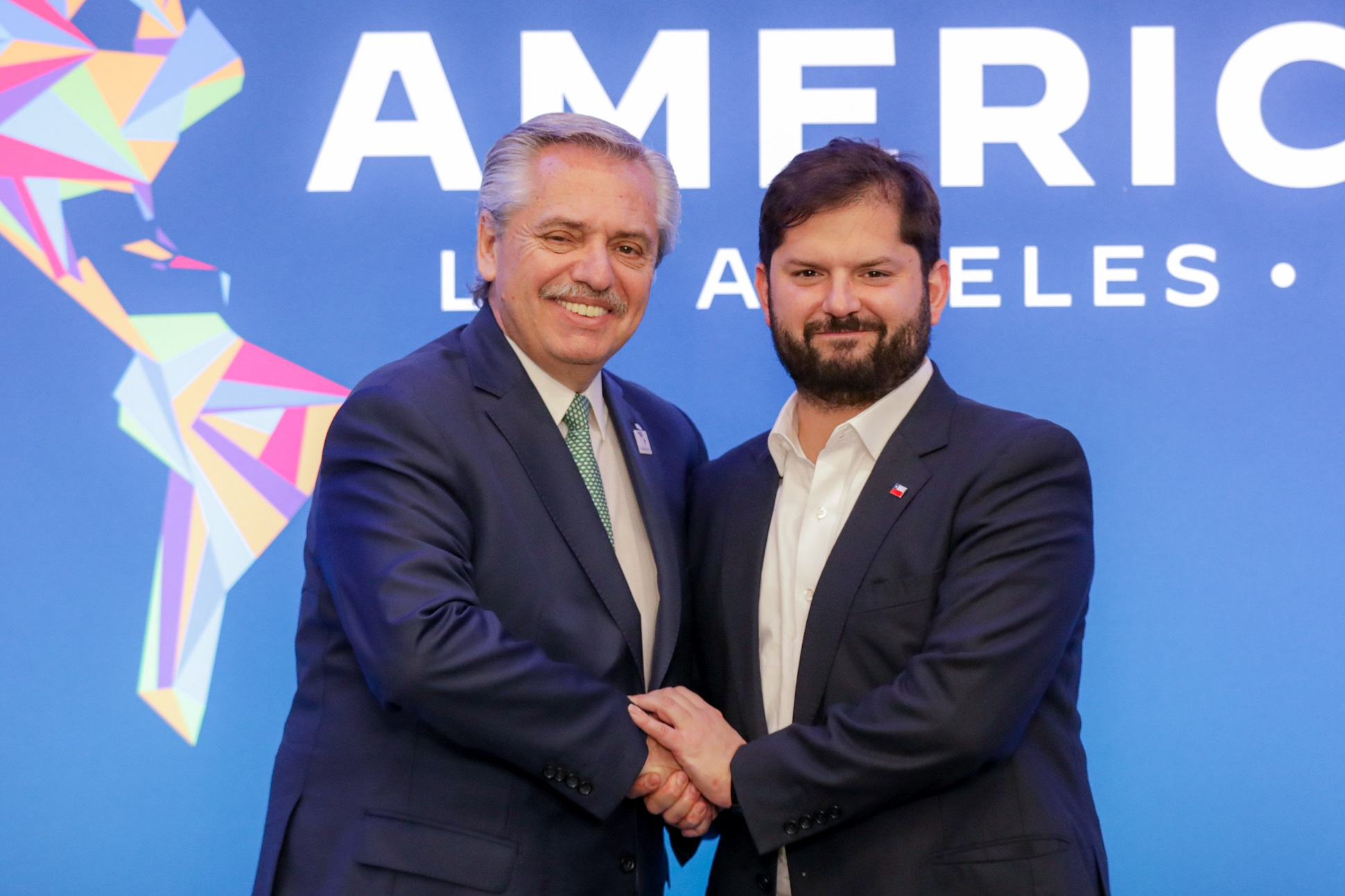
Then-Argentine President Alberto Fernández with Chilean President Gabriel Boric in 2022.

International relations between the Republic of Chile and the Argentine Republic have existed for decades. The border between the two countries is the world's third-longest international border, which is 5,300 km (3,300 mi) long and runs from north to south along the Andes mountains. Although both countries gained their independence during the South American wars of liberation, during much of the 19th and the 20th century, relations between the countries were tense as a result of disputes over the border in Patagonia. Despite this, Chile and Argentina have never been engaged in a war with each other. In recent years, relations have improved. Argentina and Chile have followed quite different economic policies. Chile has signed free trade agreements with countries such as Canada, China, South Korea, and the United States, as well as the European Union, and is a member of APEC. Argentina belongs to the Mercosur regional free trade area. In April 2018, both countries suspended their membership from the UNASUR.

== Historical relations (1550–1989) ==
=== Rule under Spain and Independence ===
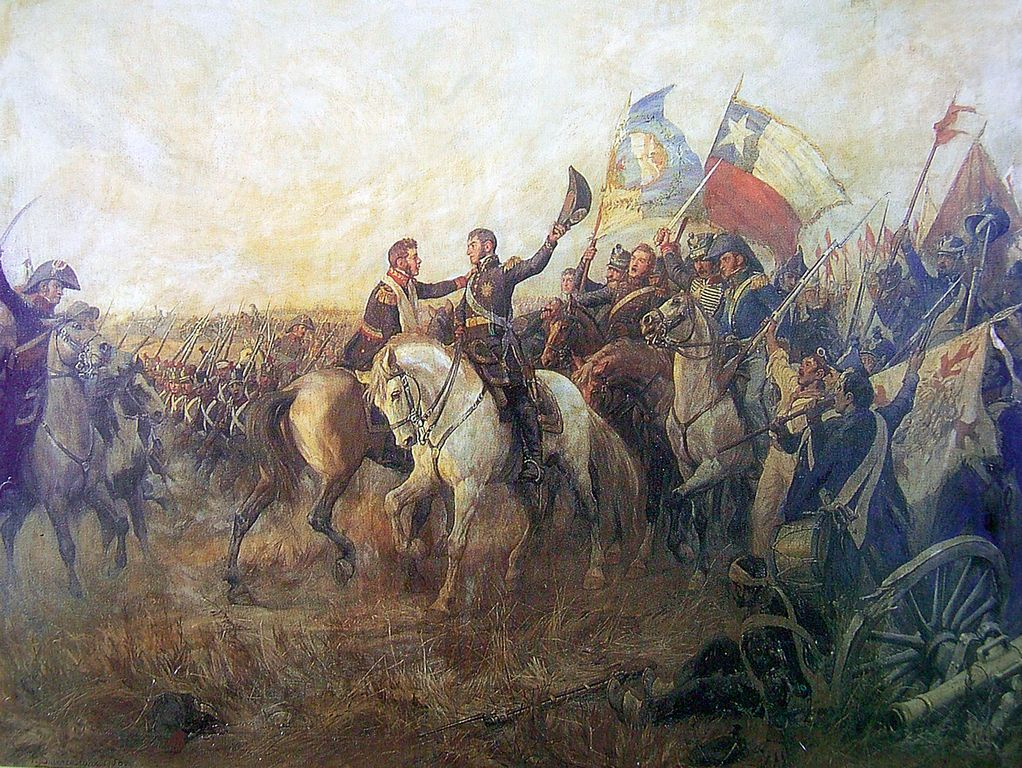
El abrazo de Maipú (English: The embrace of Maipú) between the independence heroes José de San Martín and Bernardo O'Higgins after the defeat of royalists in the Battle of Maipú

The relationship between the two countries can be traced back to an alliance during Spanish colonial times. Both colonies were offshoots of the Viceroyalty of Peru, with the Viceroyalty of the Río de la Plata (which Argentina was a part of) being broken off in 1776, and Chile not being broken off until independence. Argentina and Chile were colonized by different processes. Chile was conquered as a southward extension of the original conquest of Peru, while Argentina was colonized from Peru, Chile and from the Atlantic.

Argentina and Chile were close allies during the wars of independence from the Spanish Empire. Chile, like most of the revolting colonies, was defeated at a point by Spanish armies, while Argentina remained independent throughout its war of independence. After the Chilean defeat in the Disaster of Rancagua, the remnants of the Chilean Army led by Bernardo O'Higgins took refuge in Mendoza. Argentine General José de San Martín, by that time governor of the region, included the Chilean exiles in the Army of the Andes, and in 1817 led the crossing of the Andes, defeated the Spaniards, and confirmed the Chilean Independence. While he was in Santiago, Chile a cabildo abierto (open town hall meeting) offered San Martín the governorship of Chile, which he declined, in order to continue the liberating campaign in Peru.

In 1817 Chile began the buildup of its Navy in order to carry the war to the Viceroyalty of Perú. Chile and Argentina signed a treaty in order to finance the enterprise. But Argentina, fallen in a civil war, was unable to contribute. The naval fleet, after being built, launched a sea campaign to fight the Spanish fleet in the Pacific to liberate Peru. After a successful land and sea campaign, San Martín proclaimed the Independence of Peru in 1821.

=== War against the Peru–Bolivian Confederation ===
From 1836 to 1839, Chile and Argentina united in a war against the confederation of Peru and Bolivia. The underlying cause was the apprehension of Chile and Argentina against the potential power of the Peru-Bolivia bloc. This resulted from concern over the large territory of Peru-Bolivia as well as the perceived threat that such a rich state would represent to their southern neighbors. Chile declared the war on 11 November 1836 and Argentina on 19 May 1837.

In 1837 Felipe Braun, one of Santa Cruz's most capable generals and highly decorated veteran of the war of independence, defeated an Argentine army sent to topple Santa Cruz. On 12 November 1838 Argentine representatives signed an agreement with the Bolivian troops. However, on 20 January 1839 the Chilean force obtained a decisive victory against Peru-Bolivia at the Battle of Yungay and the short-lived Peru-Bolivian Confederation came to an end.

=== Potreros of the Andes dispute ===
In the context of the tensions between the unitary and federal sides in River Plate politics, the presence of exiles from this country in Chile, and the cutting of commercial traffic with Mendoza ordered on April 13, 1842, by the Chilean president Manuel Bulnes, and the anger of the Mendocino governor José Félix Aldao (from the federal side of Juan Manuel de Rosas), a tense event occurs in March 1845, when the Chilean cattle rancher residing in Talca, Manuel Jirón, is approached by a gang of ten or twelve Argentine rustlers coming from Cuyo in his hacienda. They requested a payment of money in the name of the Governor's Office of Mendoza. They asked for payment for the cattle grazing that Jirón was doing in the potreros of El Yeso, Los Ángeles, Valenzuela and Montañés.

Jiron paid the amount when they threatened to take away his animals, which he later confirmed to the Chilean authorities, expecting compensation for the money. The incident was known as the "mountain potreros issue".

The territory where this occurred is located south of the Diamante River in the mountainous area of Talca, so the territory was understood by Jiron as part of Chilean jurisdiction.

The Municipality of Talca was in charge of protecting the cattle ranchers in the area, and the investigation of the case showed that the aggressors came from San Rafael de Mendoza Fortress.

The Government of Chile sent a note of protest to the Government of Argentina saying:

From the inquiry which by order of this Government has been made, it appears that the pastures are situated in Chilean territory, without any doubt having arisen on this point up to the present, both from the situation of the places, and from the immemorial possession of Chilean citizens, from the recognition of the bordering Indians, from history, tradition, and from whatever titles may be alleged in favor of the rights of sovereignty and property. Not only, therefore, has an illegal act of force and depredation been committed against Chilean citizens, but also an attack against the sovereignty of this Republic and an outrageous violation of its territory.

To which Argentina did not protest.

On December 4, 1846, a technical commission was created in Buenos Aires, composed of Carmen José Domínguez and Lieutenant Nicolás Villanueva, which published on April 27, 1847, in which they argued the territories where the incident occurred as Argentine, although not specifying whether or not they belonged to the province of Cuyo, as they were south of the Diamante River:

The Llaretas and Planchón mountain ranges, which are designated by the attached plan, are an extension of the previous ones, and the Valenzuela, Montañés, Yeso and Los Ángeles valleys, which are in the same situation as that of Tunuyán, cannot by any means be considered an integral part of Chilean territory

— 27 April 1847, Technical Commission, Buenos Aires

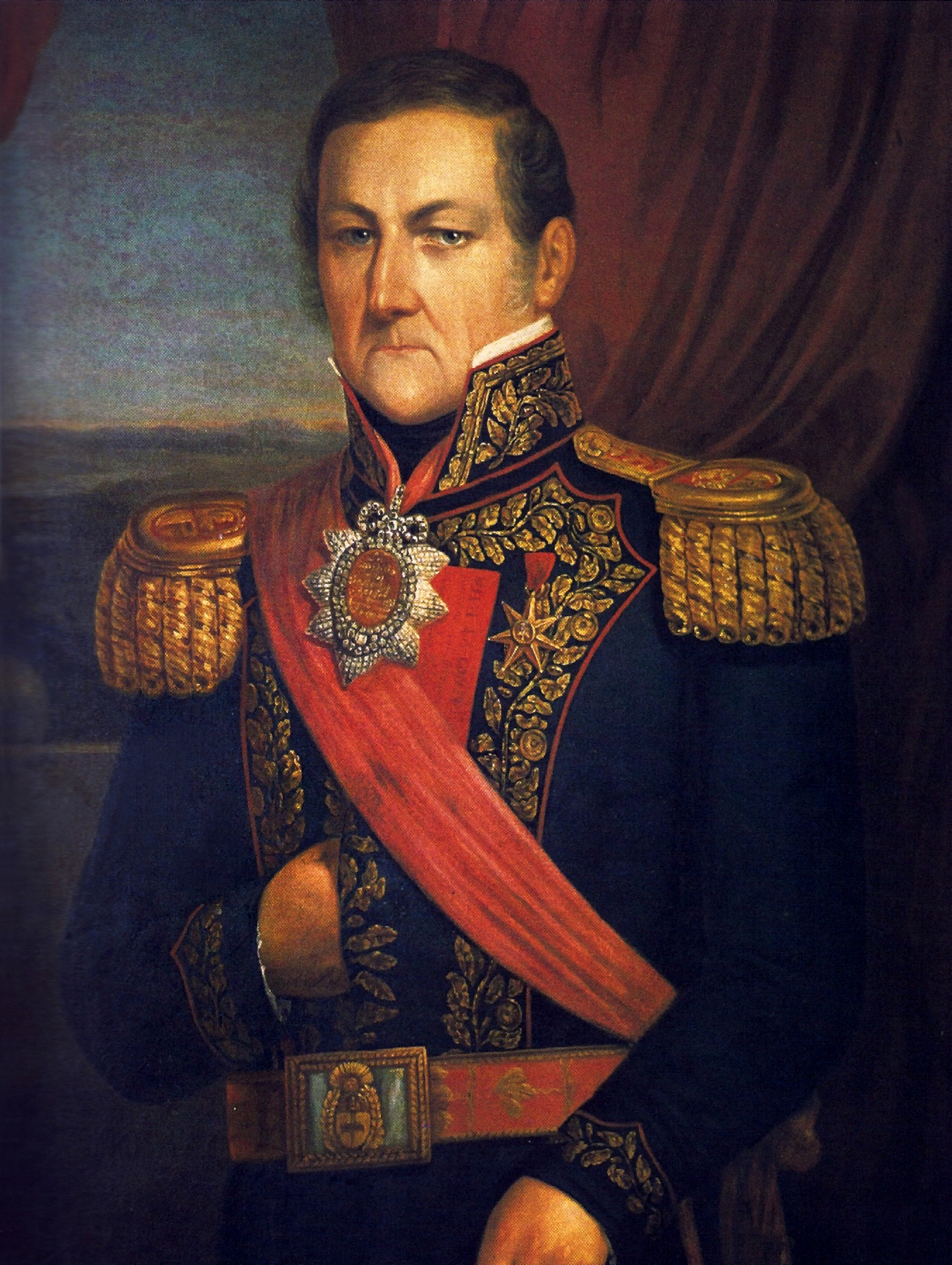
Argentine president, Juan Manuel de Rosas

The Argentine president, Juan Manuel de Rosas, sent officials to tax Talca ranchers in the area in question in 1847 and 1848. By then he had already resolved to incorporate into his country the territory south of the Diamante River to the Río Negro, most of which he knew after his 1833 expeditions.

After the 1881 treaty the boundary divided the disputed area with the areas of Valle Hermoso, Las Leñas and the eastern sector of Paso Potrerillos for Argentina, and the lands near Curicó of Potrero Grande, Potrero Chico, El Planchón, Teno Lagoons, those of the Maule river basin, such as the Maule river basin, such as the lagoon and river of La Invernada, and the sector of El Colorado for Chile.

=== Chincha's war ===
A series of coastal and high-seas naval battles between Spain and its former colonies of Peru and Chile occurred between 1864 and 1866. These actions began with Spain's seizure of the guano-rich Chincha Islands, part of a strategy by Isabel II of Spain to reassert her country's lost influence in Spain's former South American empire. These actions prompted an alliance between Ecuador, Bolivia, Peru and Chile against Spain. As a result, all Pacific coast ports of South America situated south of Colombia were closed to the Spanish fleet. Argentina, however, refused to join the alliance and maintained amicable relations with Spain and delivered coal to the Spanish fleet.

=== War of the Pacific ===
On 6 February 1873, Peru and Bolivia signed a secret treaty of alliance against Chile. On 24 September, Argentine president Domingo Faustino Sarmiento asked the Argentine Chamber of Deputies to join Argentina with the alliance. The Argentine chamber assented by a vote of 48–18. The treaty made available a credit of six million pesos for military expenditures. However, in 1874, after the delivery of the Chilean ironclad Almirante Cochrane and the ironclad Blanco Encalada, the Argentine Senate postponed the matter until late 1874, and Sarmiento was prevented signing the treaty. Consequently, Argentina remained neutral during the war; and the Argentines signed a Border Treaty with Chile in 1881.

=== Claims on Patagonia ===
Territorial losses of the Republic of Chile de jure (by law) according to Chilean historiography.

Border disputes continued between Chile and Argentina, as Patagonia was then a largely unexplored area. The Border Treaty of 1881 established the line of highest mountains dividing the Atlantic and Pacific watersheds as the border between Argentina and Chile. This principle was easily applied in northern Andean border region; but in Patagonia drainage basins crossed the Andes. This led to further disputes over whether the Andean peaks would constitute the frontier (favoring Argentina) or the drainage basins (favoring Chile). Argentina argued that previous documents referring to the boundary always mentioned the Snowy Cordillera as the frontier and not the continental divide. The Argentine explorer Francisco Perito Moreno suggested that many Patagonian lakes draining to the Pacific were in fact part of the Atlantic basin but had been moraine-dammed during the quaternary glaciations changing their outlets to the west. In 1902, war was again avoided when British King Edward VII agreed to mediate between the two nations. He cleverly established the current Argentina-Chile border in Patagonia by dividing many disputed lakes into two equal parts. Several of these lakes still have different names on each side of the frontier, such as the lake known in Chile as Lago O'Higgins and in Argentina as Lago San Martín. A dispute that arose in the northern Puna de Atacama was resolved with the Puna de Atacama Lawsuit of 1899.

Map of the dispute of eastern Patagonia, Tierra del Fuego and the Strait of Magellan between Argentina and Chile (1842–1881)

The East Patagonia, Tierra del Fuego and Strait of Magellan Dispute or the Patagonia Question was the boundary dispute between Argentina and Chile during the 19th century for the possession of the southernmost territories of South America on the basis of disagreements over the boundaries corresponding to the uti possidetis juris inherited from the Spanish Empire, which were partly due to contradictory background information.

The extensive territory corresponds to approximately one million square kilometres, which represents 45% of the current surface of Argentina, all of the center and south of that country, and which, according to Chilean historiography, would have implied a loss for Chile of two-thirds of its nominal territory de jure.

Both countries started effectively occupying different parts of the disputed land, Chile the Strait of Magellan and its nearby territory in the Santa Cruz River as well as the Neuquén Valley, and Argentina the Pampas land as well with Chubut settled with Welsh people. Both countries also started having discussions of the legal title of each country on the land inherited from the Spanish Empire, which motivated the signing of the 1856 treaty between both countries that affirmed that both countries were committed to apply the uti possidetis juris on the border; something which they both disagreed on was which territories had been inherited by each of the two nations.

The decade of 1870 saw an intensification of the dispute in the southern part of Patagonia, which saw settlements from both countries in between of each other. The dispute was ended with the Boundary Treaty of 1881 between both countries which divided the territory. At the time of the signing, Chile had already triumphed at the Battle of Miraflores against Peru in the War of the Pacific (1879–1885), demonstrating its position of power; Argentina also started the Conquest of the Desert in 1878, intensifying it when Chile was in the war, occupying several parts of Patagonia.

=== 1893 Border protocol ===

The 1893 Boundary Protocol between Argentina and Chile, also known as the Errázuriz-Quirno Costa Protocol, was an agreement signed by Isidoro Errázuriz Errázuriz representing Chile and Norberto Camilo Quirno Costa representing Argentina on 1 May 1893 in Santiago, Chile. It was signed to solve problems that arose during the demarcation of the boundary on the basis of the 1881 Treaty.

This protocol ratified the principle of "Chile to the Pacific and Argentina to the Atlantic" from which, later on, discrepancies arose regarding the limit of both oceans, and whether the principle applies to the south of parallel 52° or not, according to the protocol, it applies to the north of parallel 52° only. In addition, the principle of the "main chain" of the Andes Mountains was established. The areas affected by the protocol were: the Seno Ultima Esperanza and the Isla Grande de Tierra del Fuego.

=== Southern Patagonian Ice Field border definition in 1898 by experts from both countries ===
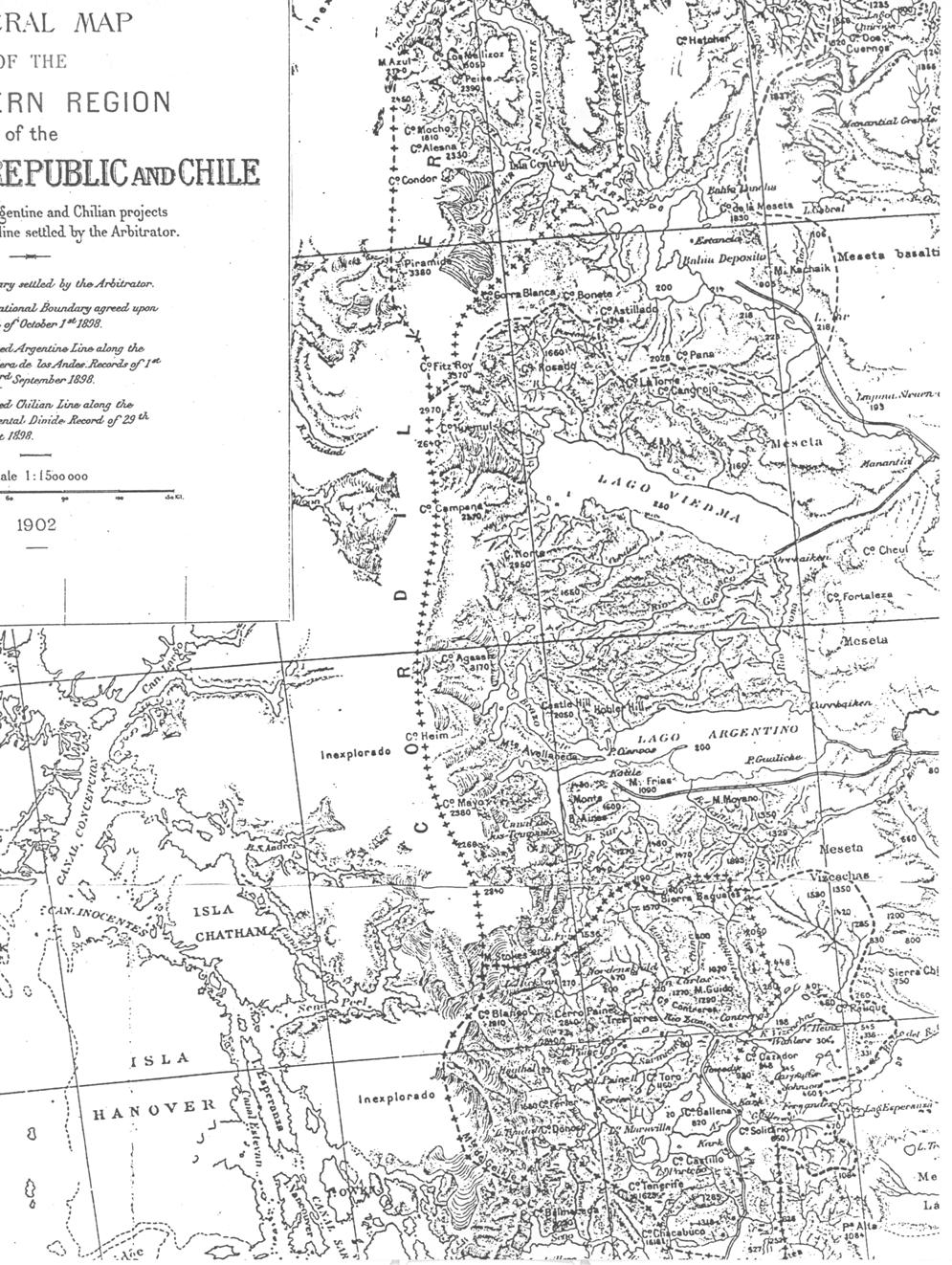
Map of the 1902 award between Argentina and Chile in the area of the Southern Patagonian Ice Field (which was not affected by it)

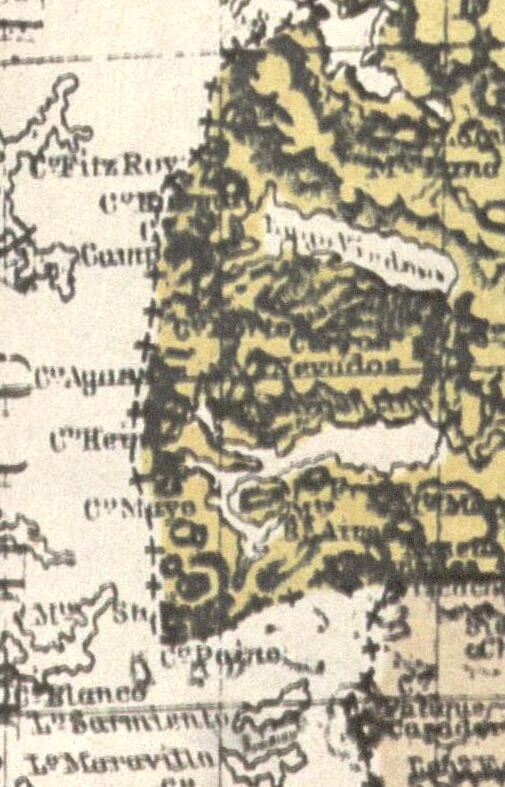
Argentine map of 1912 showing historical boundary markers agreed upon by the Argentine and Chilean experts (Fitz Roy, Huemul, Campana, Agassiz, Heim, Mayo, and Stokes/Cervantes)

The area was delimited by the Treaty of 1881 between Argentina and Chile

The boundary between Chile and the Argentine Republic is, from North to South, up to the fifty-second parallel of latitude, the Andes Mountain Range. The boundary line shall run in that extension along the highest peaks of said Cordillera dividing the waters, and shall pass between the slopes that break off on one side and the other. The difficulties that may arise due to the existence of certain valleys formed by the bifurcation of the Cordillera and where the dividing line of the waters is not clear, shall be resolved amicably by two experts appointed, one from each party. In case they do not reach an agreement, a third Expert appointed by both Governments shall be called upon to decide them. Of the operations carried out by them, a record shall be drawn up in duplicate, signed by the two Experts, on the points on which they have agreed, and also by the third Expert on the points decided by him. These minutes shall take full effect as soon as they have been signed by them and shall be considered firm and valid without the need for any other formalities or formalities. A copy of the minutes shall be sent to each of the Governments.

On 20 August 1888, an agreement was signed to carry out the demarcation of the limits according to the 1881 treaty, appointing the experts Diego Barros Arana for Chile and Octavio Pico Burgess for Argentina. In 1892, Barros Arana presented his thesis according to which the 1881 treaty had fixed the limit in the continental divortium aquarum, which was rejected by the Argentine expert.

Experts have shown that it is always convenient to take the mountain as a support for the boundary and not the watershed. Rey Balmaceda tells an anecdote of Perito Moreno, who diverted the course of the Fénix River, with the help of a crew of laborers, so that it would stop heading toward the Pacific and would swell the waters of the Deseado River. With this, Moreno wanted to demonstrate that the true basis for drawing a solid and efficient line is the mountains and not the course of the waters.

Because differences arose on several points of the border on which the experts could not agree, the demarcation was suspended in February 1892, until the Boundary Protocol between Chile and Argentina 1893 was subscribed, which in its article 1 provides:

Article One of the Treaty of July 23, 1881, stipulating that "the boundary between Chile and the Argentine Republic is from North to South up to the 52nd parallel of latitude, the Andes Cordillera", and that "the boundary line shall run along the highest peaks of the said Cordillera, dividing the waters, and that it shall pass between the slopes that break off on either side", the Experts and the Sub-Commissions shall have this principle as the invariable rule of their proceedings. Consequently, all lands and all waters, namely: lakes, lagoons, rivers and parts of rivers, streams and slopes east of the line of the highest peaks of the Andes Mountains dividing the waters, shall be considered in perpetuity as property and absolute domain of the Argentine Republic, and all lands and all waters, namely: lakes, lagoons, rivers and parts of rivers, streams and slopes east of the highest peaks of the Andes Mountains dividing the waters, shall be considered as property and absolute domain of Chile: lakes, lagoons, rivers, and parts of rivers, streams, slopes, which are found to the west of the highest peaks of the Andes Mountains that divide the waters.

This protocol is of particular importance, as the retreat of the glaciers could allow Pacific fjords to penetrate into Argentine territory.

In January 1894, the Chilean expert declared that he understood that the main chain of the Andes was the uninterrupted line of peaks that divide the waters and that form the separation of the basins or tributary hydrographic regions of the Atlantic to the east and the Pacific to the west. The Argentine expert Norberto Quirno Costa (Pico's replacement) replied that they had no authority to define the meaning of the main chain of the Andes as they were only demarcators.

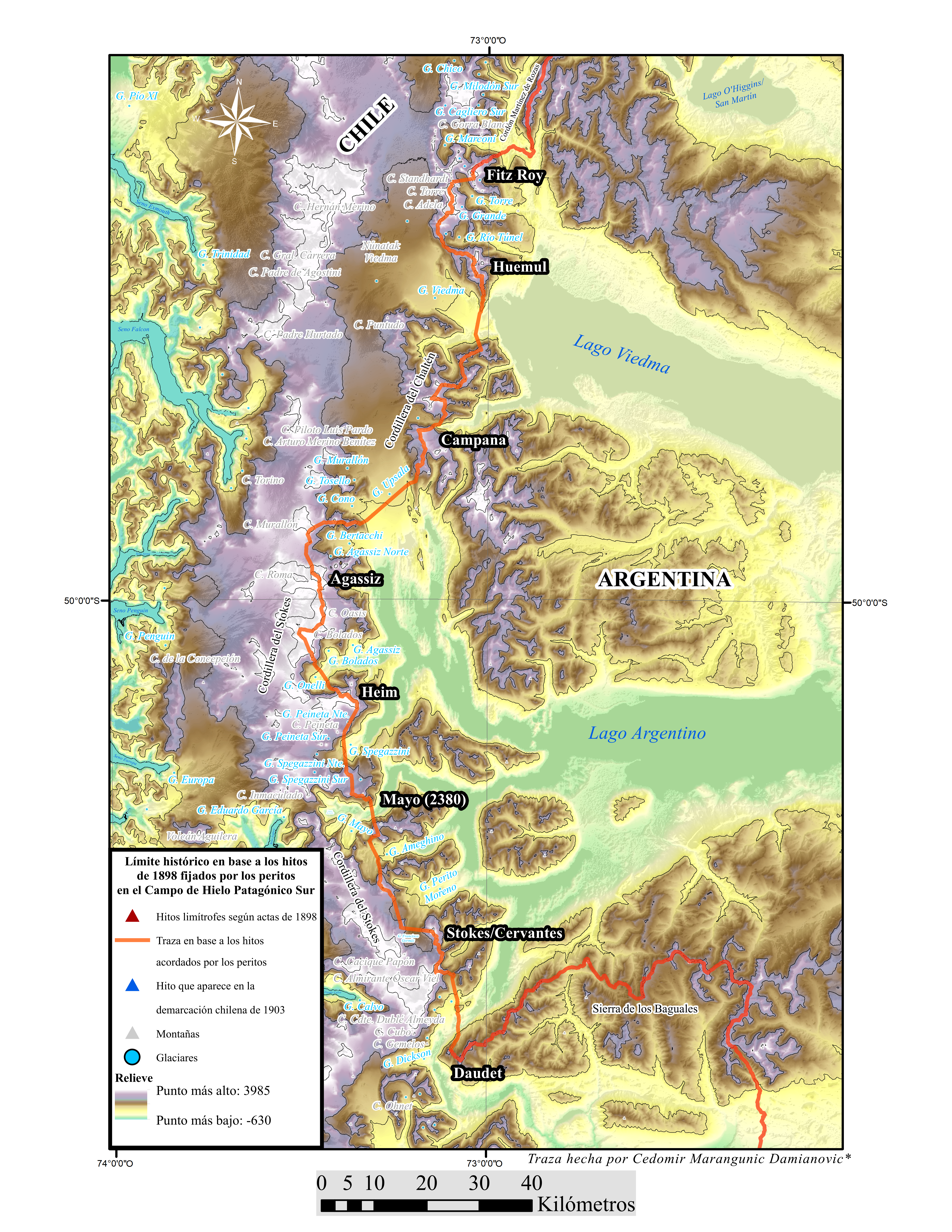
Boundary based on 1898 landmarks set by the peritos in the Southern Patagonian Ice Field.

In April 1896, the agreement to facilitate territorial delimitation operations was signed, which appointed the British monarch to arbitrate in case of disagreements. In the minutes of 1 October 1898, signed by Diego Barros Arana and Francisco Moreno (Quirno Costa's replacement, who resigned in September 1896) and by his assistants Clemente Onelli (from Argentina) and Alejandro Bertrand (from Chile), the experts:

agree with the points and stretches indicated [...] 331 and 332 [...], resolv[ing] to accept them as forming part of the dividing line [...] between the Republic of Argentina and the Republic of Chile [...].

On the attached map, point 331 is Fitz Roy and 332 is Mount Stokes, both being agreed as boundary markers, although the former is not on the watershed and was taken as a natural landmark. As the experts did not access the area, they established the caveat that if the geographical principle did not run where they had supposed it did, there could be modifications.

When the experts could not agree on different stretches of the border, it was decided in 1898 to resort to Article VI paragraph 2 of the 1881 Boundary Treaty and request Queen Victoria of the United Kingdom for an arbitration ruling on the issue, who appointed three British judges. In 1901, one of the judges, Colonel Thomas Holdich, traveled to study the disputed areas.

The Argentine government argued that the boundary should essentially be an orographic boundary along the highest peaks of the Andes and the Chilean government argued for a continental watershed. The tribunal considered that the language of the 1881 treaty and the 1893 protocol was ambiguous and susceptible to various interpretations, the two positions being irreconcilable. On 20 May 1902, King Edward VII issued the sentence which divided the territories of the four disputed sections within the boundaries defined by the extreme claims on both sides and appointed a British officer to demarcate each section in mid-1903. The award did not issue on the ice field, for, in its article 3, it sentenced:

From Mount Fitz Roy to Mount Stokes the boundary line has already been determined.

The award thus considered that in that area the high peaks are water dividing and therefore there was no dispute. Both experts, Francisco Moreno from Argentina and Diego Barros Arana from Chile agreed on the border between Fitz Roy and Stokes. Since 1898, the demarcation of the border in the ice field according to the minutes, between the two mountains, was defined on the next mountains and their natural continuity: Fitz Roy, Torre, Huemul, Campana, Agassiz, Heim, Mayo, and Stokes (nowadays Cervantes). In 1916, the Mariano Moreno range was visited by an expedition; however, Francisco Moreno already knew of its existence.

Landmarks recorded in the 1898 experts' records, and the location they understood them to be at
Landmark	Coordinates (DMS)	Coordinates (decimal)
Fitz Roy	49°16′17.02″ S, 73°02′36.80″ W	
Huemul	49°25′21.59″ S, 73°02′08.57″ W	
Campana	49°42′42.38″ S, 73°10′56.81″ W	
Agassiz	49°57′34.19″ S, 73°27′16.71″ W	
Heim	50°09′49.55″ S, 73°22′12.64″ W	
Mayo 2380	50°20′35.25″ S, 73°19′16.45″ W	
Stokes (now Cervantes)	50°34′12.17″ S, 73°08′47.92″ W	

=== Puna de Atacama dispute (1889-1898) ===
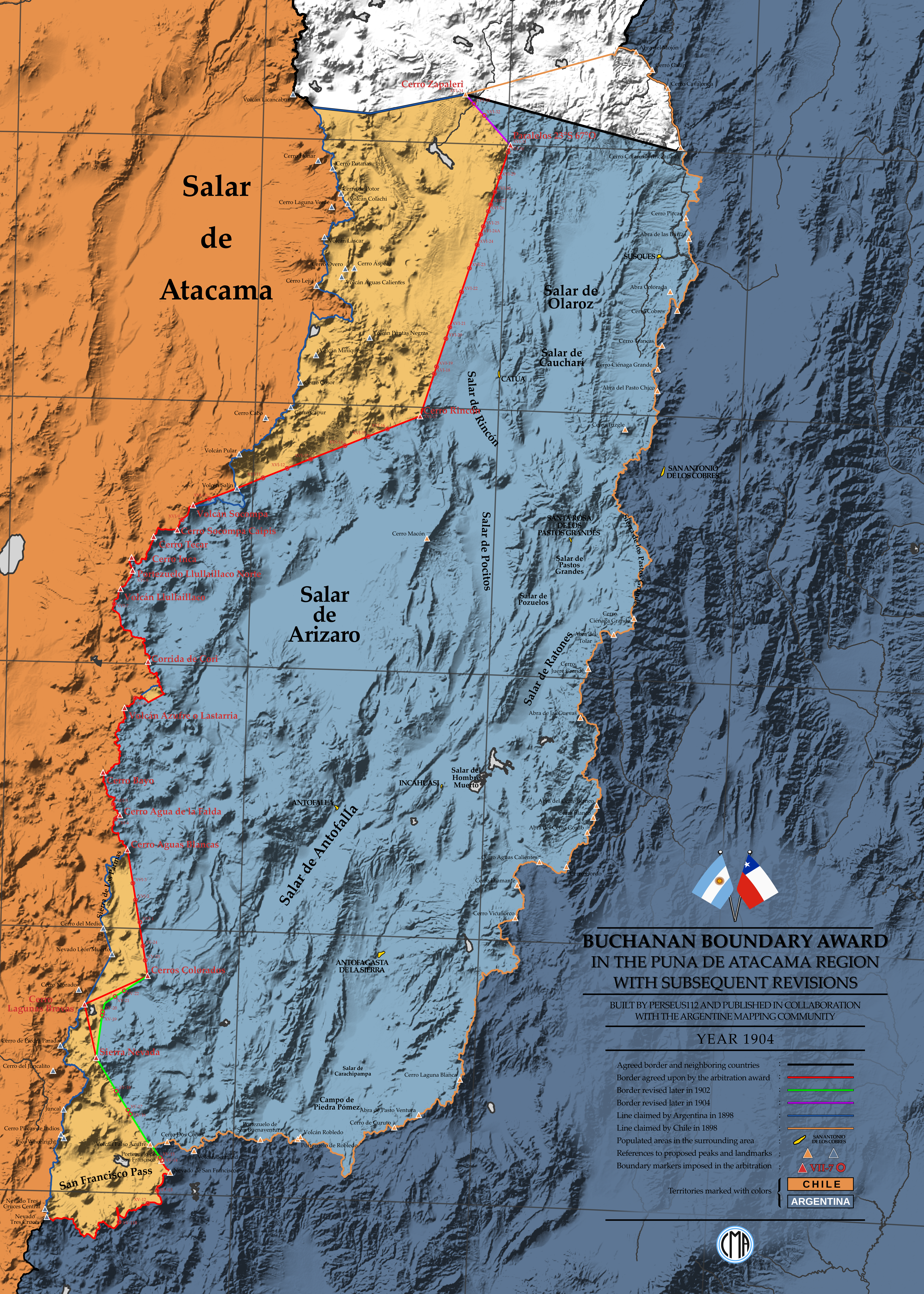
Map of the territories claimed by Argentina and Chile between 1898 and 1904 during the dispute over the Puna de Atacama.

The Puna de Atacama dispute, sometimes referred to as Puna de Atacama Lawsuit (Spanish: Litigio de la Puna de Atacama), was a border dispute involving Argentina, Chile and Bolivia in the 19th century over the arid high plateau of Puna de Atacama located about 4500 meters above the sea around the current borders of the three countries.

The dispute originated with the Chilean annexation of the Bolivian Litoral Department in 1879 during the War of the Pacific. That year, the Chilean Army occupied San Pedro de Atacama, the main settlement of the current Chilean part of Puna de Atacama. By 1884, Bolivia and its ally Peru had lost the war, and Argentina communicated to the Chilean government that the border line in the Puna was still a pending issue between Argentina and Bolivia. Chile answered that the Puna de Atacama still belonged to Bolivia. The same year, Argentina occupied Pastos Grandes in the Puna.

Bolivia had still not signed any peace treaty with Chile until the Treaty of Peace and Friendship of 1904. In the light that influential Bolivian politicians considered the Litoral Province to be lost forever, the adjacent Puna de Atacama appeared to be a remote, mountainous and arid place that was difficult to defend. That prompted the Bolivian government to use it as a tool for to obtaining benefits from both Chile and Argentina. That led to the signature of two contradictory treaties in which Bolivia granted Argentina and Chile overlapping areas:

- On May 10, 1889, a secret treaty between the Argentine minister Norberto Quirno Costa and the Bolivian envoy Santiago Vaca Guzmán was signed in Buenos Aires. The treaty established that Argentina renounced to its claims on Tarija in exchange for all the Bolivian Puna de Atacama (see Tarija dispute).
- On May 19, 1891, the Matta-Reyes Protocol was signed between Chile and Bolivia. It recognised the Bolivian territories occupied by Chile since the War of the Pacific as ceded to Chile, including those in the Puna de Atacama, in exchange for defaulting some debts.

On November 2, 1898, Argentina and Chile signed two documents in which they decided to convene a conference to define the border in Buenos Aires with delegates of both countries. If there was no agreement, a Chilean and Argentine delegate and the United States minister to Argentina, William Buchanan, would decide. As foreseen, there was no accord at the conference, and Buchanan proceeded with the delegates of Chile, Enrique Mac Iver, and Argentina José Evaristo Uriburu, to define the border.

Of the 75,000 km^{2} in dispute, 64,000 (85%) were awarded to Argentina and 11,000 (15%) to Chile.

=== Arms race and foreign policy cooperation ===
==== Dreadnought race ====
At the start of the 1900s a naval arms race began amongst the most powerful and wealthy countries in South America: Argentina, Brazil and Chile. It began when the Brazilian government ordered three formidable battleships whose capabilities far outstripped older vessels after the Brazilian Navy found itself well behind the Argentine and Chilean navies in quality and total tonnage.

=== Baltimore Crisis ===
During the Baltimore Crisis which brought Chile and the United States to the brink of war in 1891 (at the end of the 1891 Chilean Civil War), the Argentine foreign minister Estanislao Zeballos offered the US-minister in Buenos Aires the Argentine province of Salta as base of operations from which to attack Chile overland. In return, Argentina asked the U.S. for the cession of southern Chile to Argentina. Later, Chile and the United States averted the war.

=== Pactos de Mayo and 1902 Andes Boundary Case ===
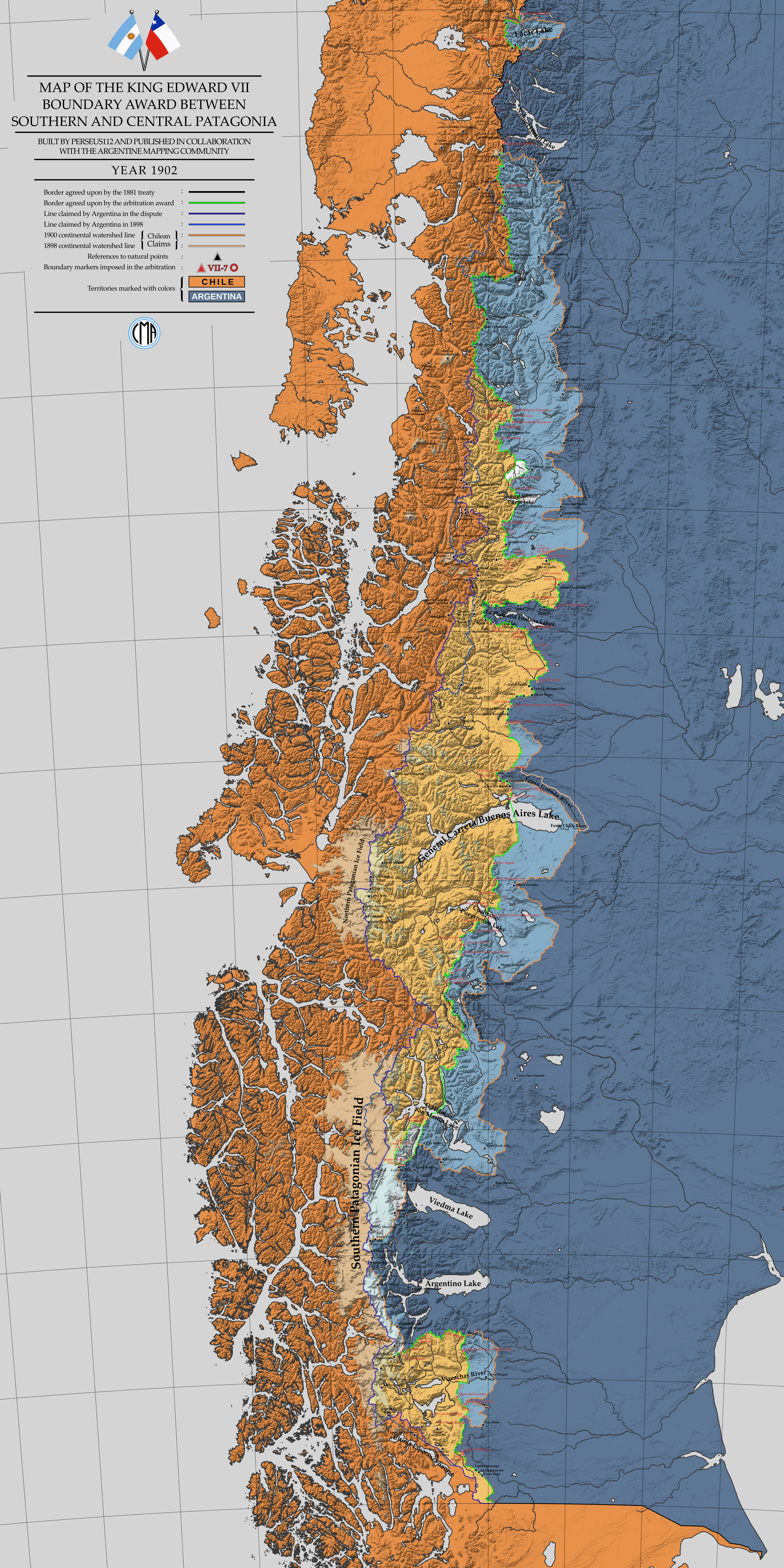
1902 Andes Boundary Case.

The Pactos de Mayo are four protocols signed in Santiago de Chile by Chile and Argentina on 28 May 1902 in order to extend their relations and resolve its territorial disputes. The disputes had led both countries to increase their military budgets and run an arms race in the 1890s. More significantly the two countries divided their influence in South America into two spheres: Argentina would not threaten Chile's Pacific Coast hegemony, and Chile promised not to intrude east of the Andes.

The 1902 Arbitral award of the Andes between Argentina and Chile (Spanish: Laudo limítrofe entre Argentina y Chile de 1902) was a British arbitration in 1902 that established the present-day boundaries between Argentina and Chile. In northern and central Patagonia, the borders were established between the latitudes of 40° and 52° S as an interpretation of the Boundary treaty of 1881 between Chile and Argentina.

As result of the arbitration, some Patagonian lakes, such as O'Higgins/San Martín Lake, became divided by a national boundary. Additionally the preferences of settled colonists in a cultivated part of the area in dispute had been canvassed. The boundary proposed in the arbitration was a compromise between the boundary preferences of the two disputing governments, which strictly followed neither the alignment of highest peaks nor the fluvial watershed, and was published in the name of King Edward VII.

The statue Christ the Redeemer of the Andes was erected in 1904 as a symbol of the new friendship, on the border where Chile Route 60 met National Route 7 (Argentina).

=== Snipe incident ===
In 1958 the Argentine Navy shelled a Chilean lighthouse and disembarked infantry in the uninhabitable islet Snipe, at the east entrance of the Beagle Channel.

=== Laguna del Desierto dispute (1949-1994) and the killing of Hernán Merino Correa ===
A map showing the territorial dispute between Chile and Argentina

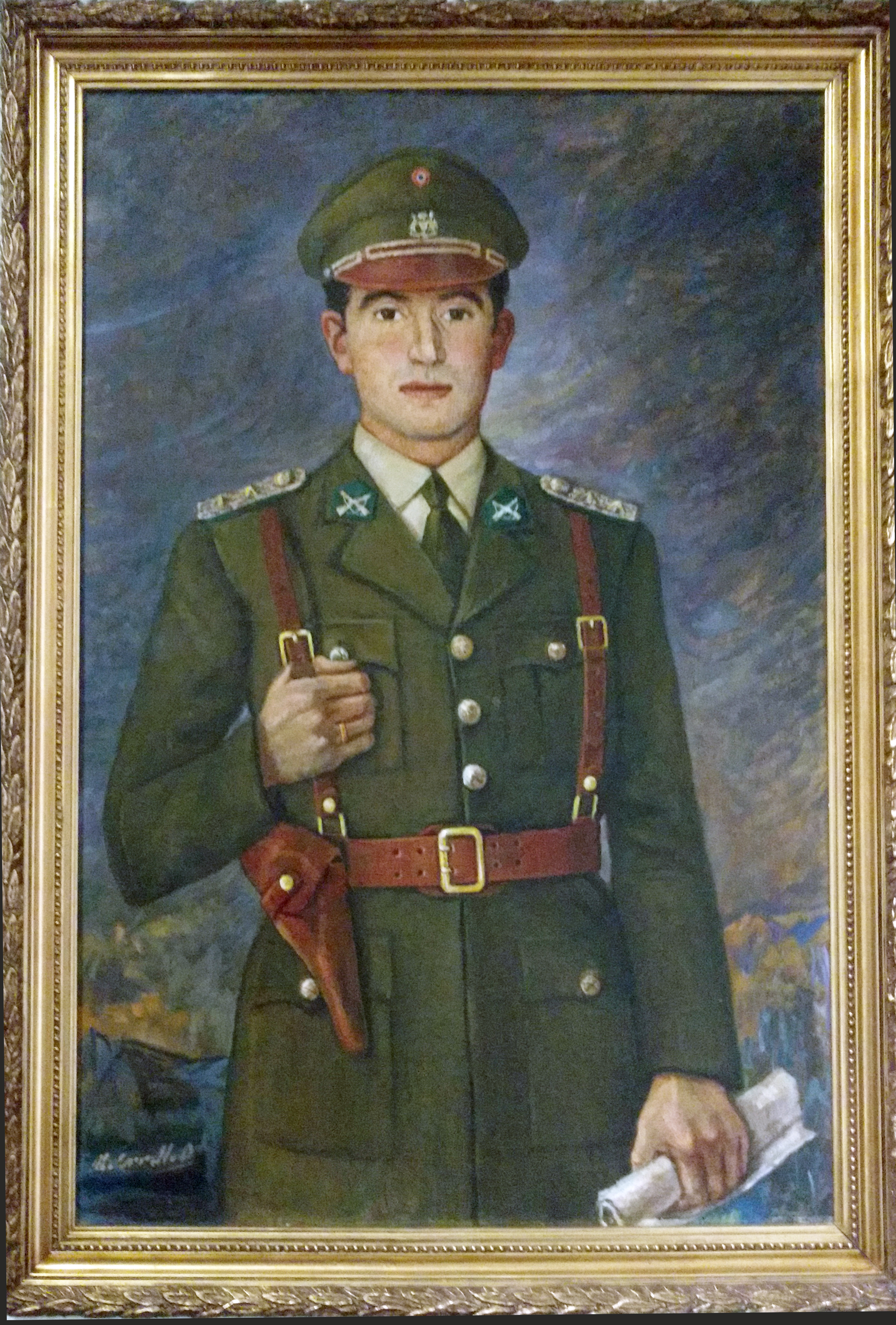
Chilean Carabineros Lieutenant Hernán Merino Correa

The Laguna del Desierto dispute was a territorial conflict between Argentina and Chile over a 481 km^{2} region in Patagonia, located between Hito 62 on the southern shore of Lago O'Higgins/San Martín and Monte Fitz Roy, encompassing the Del Desierto Lake. The dispute, rooted in differing interpretations of the 1881 Boundary Treaty and the 1902 arbitral award, escalated on November 6, 1965, when a clash between 90 members Argentine National Gendarmerie and Chilean Carabineros de Chile resulted in the death of Lieutenant Hernán Merino Correa, and Sergeant Miguel Manríquez injured, and two captured Chilean officers. Argentine forces seized a Chilean flag, later displayed as a war trophy until its return in 2017. This created a tense atmosphere between Chile and Argentina.

The dispute stemmed from ambiguities in the 1881 Treaty, which defined the border along the highest Andean peaks dividing waters, and the 1902 arbitration by Edward VII, which imprecisely divided the region due to limited geographic knowledge. In 1991, Presidents Patricio Aylwin and Carlos Saúl Menem agreed to international arbitration. The tribunal, led by Rafael Nieto Navia, ruled on October 21, 1994, largely favoring Argentina's claim based on the local water divide, assigning almost all of the disputed area to Argentina. Chile's reconsideration request was rejected on October 13, 1995. The ruling left Chile with limited access to Mount Fitz Roy via the Circo de los Altares.

=== Encuentro River-Alto Palena boundary dispute (1913-1966) ===
Alto Palena–Encuentro River dispute

The Encuentro River-Alto Palena boundary dispute was a territorial dispute between the Republic of Argentina and the Republic of Chile over the delimitation of the boundary between milestones XVI and XVII of their common border in the valleys located north of Lake General Vintter/Palena (formerly Lake General Paz), which was resolved on 24 November 1966 by means of an arbitration decision of Queen Elizabeth II of the United Kingdom.

Hans Steffen Hoffmann, an Anglo-German explorer settled in Chile, discovered the Encuentro River on 6 January 1894 and described it.

The valleys of California, Hondo and Horquetas began to be populated by Chilean settlers from 1906.

On the map prepared by Argentine engineer Gunnar Lange for the 1902 arbitration award, he confused the El Salto River with the Encuentro River (named in the 1902 award), locating its source at the Cerro de la Virgen, which Lange named in his map. However, the river originates at the Picacho de la Virgen, a key factor in the dispute. The peak was named after the homonymous hill in the 1950s.

The conflict arose over the boundary demarcation in the region of the Encuentro River in the eastern valleys of Alto Palena. On 26 July 1952, the Argentine Gendarmerie occupied disputed areas such as Hondo Valley, Horquetas Valley, and the Engaño Lakes, informing settlers that they had one month to regularize their situation before the Argentine state. This prompted a diplomatic protest from Chile. On 4 August, the Argentine gendarmes returned to the area.

On 3 November 1958, Argentine gendarmes again entered the disputed area, surrounding the Quebrada Honda and Horquetas Valley, blocking Chilean settlers’ access to the greenhouses of the Engaño Lakes.

In June 1964, the Argentine Gendarmerie built facilities in Horquetas Valley and began to erect fences there and in Hondo Valley. In 1965, the gendarmerie's presence in the valley, which Chile considered part of its territory, created diplomatic tensions.

On two occasions, the Argentine Gendarmerie fired machine guns at Chilean Carabineros in Horquetas Valley, as well as at two Chilean journalists from Revista Vea in July 1964, without causing injuries.

To resolve the dispute, the General Arbitration Treaty (from the Pacts of May 1902) was invoked, and in June 1966 Chile and Argentina requested a definitive ruling from the British Crown. The judgment was issued on 9 December 1966, drawing the border approximately along the border of Chilean and Argentine colonization. The ruling divided the disputed territory between the two countries, which was distributed between the commune of Palena in the Palena Province, nowadays part of Los Lagos Region in Chile and the Languiñeo Department in the Chubut Province in Argentina. About 420 km^{2} of fertile disputed land was awarded to Argentina, including Norte and Hondo Valleys, the Picacho de la Virgen, the Cordon de las Vírgenes, and the rich area of the Engaño River and Engaño Lakes, as well as consolidating Argentina's occupation of Horquetas Valley. Meanwhile, California Valley, the most fertile part of the disputed territory, was recognized as Chilean, and the Cerro de la Virgen was designated as a binational landmark.

=== Beagle conflict (1904-1984) and the Argentinian invasion plan "Operation Soberanía" ===
The Beagle Conflict and its maritime projection.

Trouble once again began to brew in the 1960s, when Argentina began to claim that the Picton, Lennox and Nueva islands in the Beagle Channel were rightfully theirs, although this was in direct contradiction of the 1881 treaty, as the Beagle Channel Arbitration, and the initial Beagle Channel cartography since 1881 stated.

Both countries submitted the controversy to binding arbitration by the international tribunal. The decision (see Beagle Channel Arbitration between the Republic of Argentina and the Republic of Chile, Report and Decision of the Court of Arbitration) recognized all the islands to be Chilean territory. Argentina unilaterally repudiated the decision of the tribunal and planned a war of aggression against Chile.

Direct negotiations between Chile and Argentina in 1977-78 failed and relations became extremely tense. Argentina sent troops to the border in Patagonia and in Chile large areas were mined. On 22 December, Argentina started Operation Soberanía in order to invade the islands and continental Chile, but after a few hours stopped the operation when Pope John Paul II sent a personal message to both presidents urging a peaceful solution. Both countries agreed that the Pope would mediate the dispute through the offices of Cardinal Antonio Samoré his special envoy (See Papal mediation in the Beagle conflict).

On 9 January 1979 the Act of Montevideo was signed in Uruguay pledging both sides to a peaceful solution and a return to the military situation of early 1977. The conflict was still latent during the Falklands War and was resolved only after the fall of the Argentine military junta.

A number of prominent public officials in Chile still point to past Argentine treaty repudiations when referring to relations between the two neighbors.

=== Falklands War ===
During the Falklands War in 1982, with the Beagle conflict still pending, Chile and Colombia were the only South American countries to abstain from voting in the TIAR.

The Argentine government planned to seize the disputed Beagle Channel islands after the occupation of the Falkland Islands. Basilio Lami Dozo the then Chief of the Argentine Air Force, disclosed that Leopoldo Galtieri told him that:

"[Chile] have to know what we are doing now, because they will be the next in turn.

Óscar Camilión, the last Argentine Foreign Minister before the war (29 March 1981 to 11 December 1981) has stated that:

"The military planning was, after the solution of the Falklands case, to invade the disputed islands in the Beagle. That was the determination of the Argentine Navy."

These preparations were public. On 2 June 1982 the newspaper La Prensa published an article by Manfred Schönfeld explaining what would follow Argentina's expected victory in the Falkland Islands:

"The war will not be finished for us, because after the defeat of our enemies in the Falklands, they must be blown away from South Georgia, the South Sandwich Islands, and all Argentine Austral archipelagos."

Argentine General Osiris Villegas demanded (in April 1982) after the successful Argentine landing in the Falklands that his government stop negotiations with Chile and seize the islands south of the Beagle. In his book La propuesta pontificia y el espacio nacional comprometido, (p. 2), he asked:

no persistir en una diplomacia bilateral que durante años la ha inhibido para efectuar actos de posesión efectiva en las islas en litigio que son los hechos reales que garantizan el establecimiento de una soberanía usurpada y la preservación de la integridad del territorio nacional.

This intention was probably known to the Chilean government, as the Chileans provided the United Kingdom with 'limited, but significant information' during the conflict. The Chilean Connection is described in detail by Sir Lawrence Freedman in his book The Official History of the Falklands Campaign.

Post-Pinochet democratic governments in Chile have given greater support to the Argentine claim on the Falkland Islands.

In June 2010 (as in 2009 and years before) Chile has supported the Argentine position at the United Nations Special Committee on Decolonization calling for direct negotiations between Argentina and the United Kingdom concerning the Falkland Islands dispute.

=== Peace and Friendship Treaty of 1984 ===
This important treaty (Spanish: Tratado de Paz y Amistad de 1984 entre Chile y Argentina) was an agreement signed in 1984 between Argentina and Chile establishing friendly relations between the two countries. Particularly, the treaty defines the border delineation and freedom of navigation in the Strait of Magellan and gives possession of the Picton, Lennox and Nueva islands and sea located south of Tierra del Fuego to Chile, but the most part of the Exclusive Economic Zone eastwards of the Cape Horn-Meridian to Argentina. After that, other border disputes were resolved by peaceful means.

The 1984 treaty was succeeded by the Maipu Treaty of Integration and Cooperation (Tratado de Maipú de Integración y Cooperación) signed on 30 October 2009.

== Post-1990 relations ==
=== Argentine support for Bolivia ===
Despite the Pactos de Mayo agreement, in 2004 Argentina proposed to establish a "corridor" through Chilean territory under partial Argentine administration as a Bolivian outlet to sea. After talks with Chilean ambassador to Argentina, the Kirchner government pulled out of the proposal and declared the issue as "concerning Chile and Bolivia" only.

=== Border issues ===
This map shows the current border of the Southern Patagonian Ice Field, the B Section is pending delineation since 1998.

In 1898 the border in the Southern Patagonian Ice Field was defined and wasn't objected during the 1902 Arbitral award of the Andes which defined most of the border on the current Province territory. Both experts, Francisco Pascasio Moreno from Argentina and Diego Barros Arana from Chile agreed on the border between Mount Fitz Roy and Cerro Daudet. However the border started being questioned by Argentina later on which started the dispute between both countries.

In the 1990s, relations improved dramatically. The dictator and last president of the Argentine Military Junta, General Reynaldo Bignone, called for democratic elections in 1983, and Augusto Pinochet of Chile did the same in 1989. As a consequence, militaristic tendencies faded in Argentina. The Argentine presidents Carlos Menem and Fernando de la Rúa had particularly good relations with Chile. In a bilateral manner, both countries settled all the remaining disputes except Laguna del Desierto, which was decided by International Arbitration in 1994. That decision favoured Argentine claims.

According to a 1998 negotiation held in Buenos Aires, a 50 km (31 mi) a border redraw is agreed, being pending to this day the part between Mount Fitz Roy and Cerro Murallón, however a new border was drawn between Cerro Murallón and Cerro Daudet.

In 2006, president Néstor Kirchner invited Chile to define the border in the pending area, but Michelle Bachelet's government left the invitation unanswered. The same year, the Chilean government sent a note to Argentina complaining that Argentine tourism maps showed the boundary claimed by Argentina in the Southern Patagonian Ice Field prior to the 1998 agreement, placing most of the area in Argentina.

In the maps published in Argentina, until today, the region continues to be shown without the white rectangle, as can be seen in a map of Santa Cruz on a website of an official Argentine agency. While in the official Chilean maps and most tourist maps, the rectangle is shown and it is clarified that the boundary is not demarcated according to the 1998 treaty.

Officially Chile is a neutral party in the Argentine claim on the Falkland Islands. Although Chile acknowledges the Argentine claim as legal, it does not support any special party continuously calling for peaceful negotiations to resolve the matter.

Overlapping Argentine and Chilean Antarctic claims on Antarctica (1946–present).

Geopolitics over Antarctica and the control of the passages between the south Atlantic and the south Pacific have led to the founding of cities and towns such as Ushuaia and Puerto Williams, both of which claim to be the southernmost cities in World. Currently, both countries have research stations in Antarctica, as does the United Kingdom. All three nations claim the totality of the Antarctic Peninsula.

==== Dispute over the extended continental shelf ====
Map of the dispute.

The United Nations Convention on the Law of the Sea (UNCLOS) of April 30, 1982, which entered into force on November 16, 1994, established the regime of the continental shelf in Part VI (Articles 76 to 85), defining in Article 76, paragraph 1 what is understood as a continental shelf.

Argentina ratified the convention on January 12, 1995, and it came into force for the country on December 31, 1995.

On August 25, 1997, Chile signed and ratified the United Nations Convention on the Law of the Sea, and it entered into force for the country on September 24, 1997.

In 2009, Argentina submitted a presentation to the United Nations Commission on the Limits of the Continental Shelf, which was accepted in 2016 by the UNCLOS. The map in the submission included the disputed territories with the United Kingdom, such as the Falkland Islands, South Georgia, and South Sandwich Islands, a crescent-shaped area south of Argentina's territorial sea as defined in the 1984 treaty with Chile. This area was also claimed by Chile as part of its presential sea, and the sea surrounding the Antarctic Peninsula, which is claimed by all three aforementioned countries. That same year, on May 8, Chile submitted its Preliminary Report to the United Nations Commission on the Limits of the Continental Shelf.

In 2020, the Argentine Chamber of Deputies unanimously approved the outer limit of the Argentine Continental Shelf in Law 27,557.

That same year, on December 21, Chile submitted to the United Nations Commission on the Limits of the Continental Shelf the partial report on the extended continental shelf in Easter Island and Salas y Gómez.

In 2021, Chilean President Sebastián Piñera signed Supreme Decree No. 95, which outlined the continental shelf east of the 67º 16' 0 meridian as part of Chile's continental shelf (not the extended one) area projected from the Diego Ramírez Islands, also claiming the crescent area that Argentina considers part of its extension achieved under the extended continental shelf principle. This was reflected in the SHOA Chart No. 8 and prompted a response from the Argentine Foreign Ministry against Chile's measure.

In February 2022, Chile submitted its second partial presentation regarding the Western Continental Shelf of the Chilean Antarctic Territory. In August of the same year, Chile made the oral presentations of both partial submissions during the 55th Session of the Commission on the Limits of the Continental Shelf at the United Nations in New York.

In 2023, Chile, through SHOA, made available an illustrative graphic showing all the maritime areas claimed by the country, which was once again rejected by Argentina.

In July 2023, the International Court of Justice ruled on the priority of a Continental Shelf over an Extended Continental Shelf in the case of the territorial and maritime dispute between Colombia and Nicaragua.

=== Economy and energy ===
Trade between the two countries is made mostly over the mountain passes that have enough infrastructure for large scale trade. The trade balance shows a great deal of asymmetry. As of 2005, Chile was the third export trading partner for Argentina, behind Brazil and the United States.

In 1996, Chile became an associate member of Mercosur, a regional trade agreement that Argentina and Brazil created in the 1990s. This associate membership does not convey full membership to Chile, however. In 2009, approvals were granted for a $3-billion Pascua Lama project to mine an ore body on the border of the two countries. In 2016, Argentina's exports to Chile amounted to US$2.3 billion, while Chile's exports to Argentina amounted to US$689.5 million.

In August 2026, bilateral trade between Argentina and Chile resulted in a trade surplus of $429 million for Argentina, with $482 million in exports to Chile and $52.9 million in imports. Between August 2025 and August 2026, Argentine exports to Chile decreased by 29.5% ($201 million), down from $683 million, while imports from Chile fell by 15% ($9.37 million), down from $62.3 million.

=== Gas ===
Argentine president Carlos Menem signed a natural gas exportation treaty with Chilean president Eduardo Frei Ruiz-Tagle in 1996. In 2005, President Néstor Kirchner broke the treaty due to a supply shortage experienced by Argentina. The situation in Argentina was partly resolved when Argentina increased its own imports from Bolivia, a country with no diplomatic relations with Chile since 1978. In the import contract signed with Bolivia it was specified that not even a drop of Bolivian gas could be sold to Chile from Argentina.

=== Sports ===
In 2003, Argentine AFA's president suggested that both countries launch a joint bid for the 2014 FIFA World Cup but was abandoned in favor of a CONMEBOL unified posture to allow the tournament be hosted in Brazil.

Beginning in 2009, the Dakar Rally began to be held in South America, and both Argentina and Chile have collaborated in organizing the annual cross-border event multiple times.

Host country Chile and Argentina contested the 2015 Copa America final and Chile was declared Champion after penalty shots. Copa America 2016 trophy was also for Chile against Argentina once again in the penalty shots.

Argentina's and Chile's clash in Pool D of the 2023 Rugby World Cup in France marked the first ever encounter between two South American teams since the inception of the tournament in 1987. Los Pumas went on to defeat Los Cóndores 59 points to 5. The encounter is considered a milestone in the development of rugby in South America.

=== Technology ===
Argentina announced on 28 August 2009 the election of the Japanese/Brazilian ISDB-T digital television standard with Chile following the same direction on 14 September.

=== Military integration ===
Since the 1990s, both militaries have begun a close defense cooperation and friendship policy. In September 1991 they signed together with Brazil, the Mendoza Declaration, which commits signatories not to use, develop, produce, acquire, stock, or transfer —directly or indirectly— chemical or biological weapons.

Joint exercises were established on an annual basis in the three armed forces alternately in Argentina and Chile territory. An example of such maneuvers is the Patrulla Antártica Naval Combinada (English: Joint Antarctic Naval Patrol) performed by both Navies to guarantee safety to all touristic and scientific ships that are in transit within the Antarctic Peninsula.

Both nations are highly involved in UN peacekeeping missions. UNFICYP in Cyprus was a precedent where Chilean troops are embedded in the Argentine contingent. They played a key role together at MINUSTAH in Haiti^{(Video Haiti)} and in 2005 they began the formation of a joint force for future United Nations mandates. Named Cruz del Sur (English: Crux), the new force began assembly in 2008 with headquarters alternately on each country every year.

In 2005, while the Argentine Navy school ship ARA Libertad was under overhaul, Argentine cadets were invited to complete their graduation on the Chilean Navy school ship Esmeralda and in another gesture of confidence, on 24 June 2007, a Gendarmeria Nacional Argentina (Border Guard) patrol was given permission to enter Chile to rescue tourists after their bus became trapped in snow.

=== Chilean earthquake ===
On 13 March 2010, following the Chilean earthquake the benefit concert Argentina Abraza Chile (English: Argentina Hugs Chile) was hosted in Buenos Aires, and an Argentine Air Force Mobile Field Hospital was deployed to Curicó.

On 8 April 2010 the newly elected Chilean president Sebastián Piñera made his first trip abroad a visit to Buenos Aires where he thanked president Cristina Fernández for the help received. He also stated his commitment to an increased cooperation between the two countries.

=== Argentina protects fugitive of Chilean justice ===
In September 2010, CONARE (the Argentine National Refugee Commission, a department of the Argentine Interior Ministry) granted asylum to Chilean citizen Galvarino Apablaza. Apablaza now lives in Argentina where he is married to journalist Paula Chain, and is father to three Argentine-born children. Chain has worked for the Argentine Government press office since 2009. Apablaza is accused by Chile of being involved in the murder of Chilean Senator Jaime Guzmán in 1991, during the government of Patricio Aylwin, as well as the kidnapping of the son of one of the owners of the El Mercurio newspaper. The asylum status has been universally rejected by the Chilean government, as well as by the Argentine political opposition. Some Argentine media and journalists have pointed out that the Argentine government ignored a ruling of the Argentine Supreme Court of Justice allowing the extradition of Apablaza. Chilean state attorney Gustavo Gené has pointed out that there was no question of the Chilean legal system's authority or grounds by the Argentine Commission, and that the reasons for granting political asylum were based exclusively on "humanitarian grounds".

=== The Argentine decree 256/2010 about the Strait of Magellan ===
On 17 February 2010 the Argentine executive issued the decree 256/2010 pertaining to authorisation requirements placed on shipping to and from Argentina but also to ships going through Argentine jurisdictional water heading for ports in the Falkland Islands, South Georgia and South Sandwich Islands. This decree was implemented by disposition 14/2010 of the Prefectura Naval Argentina. On 19 May 2010 the United Kingdom presented a note verbale rejecting the Argentine government's decrees and stipulating that the UK considered the decrees "are not compliant with International Law including the UN Convention on the Law of the Sea ", and with respect to the Straits of Magellan the note recalls that "the rights of international shipping to navigate these waters expeditiously and without obstacle are affirmed in the 1984 Treaty of Peace and Friendship between Chile and Argentina with respect to the Straits of Magellan".

Article 10 of the 1984 Treaty states "The Argentine Republic undertakes to maintain, at any time and in whatever circumstances, the right of ships of all flags to navigate expeditiously and without obstacles through its jurisdictional waters to and from the Strait of Magellan".

== Resident diplomatic missions ==
- Argentina has an embassy in Santiago and consulates-general in Antofagasta, Concepción, Puerto Montt, Punta Arenas and Valparaíso.
- Chile has an embassy in Buenos Aires and consulates-general in Bariloche, Córdoba, Mendoza, Neuquén, Río Gallegos, Rosario and Salta; and consulates in Bahía Blanca, Comodoro Rivadavia, Mar del Plata, Río Grande and Ushuaia.
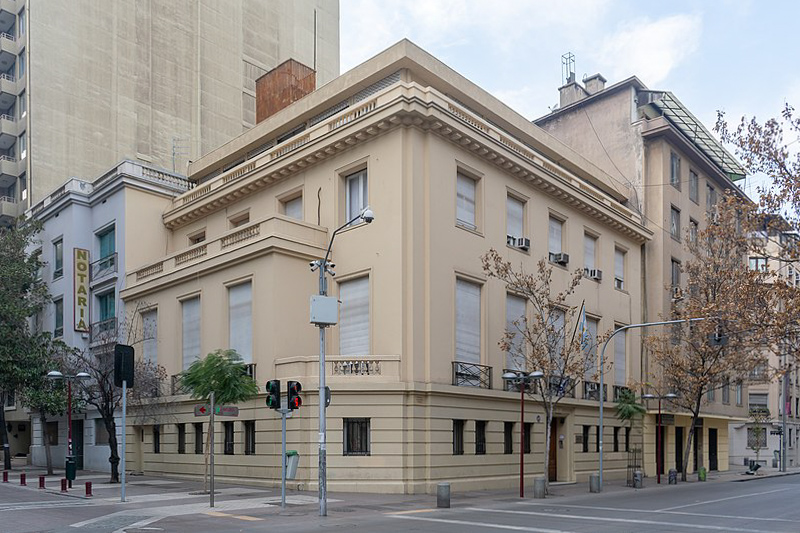
Embassy of Argentina in Santiago

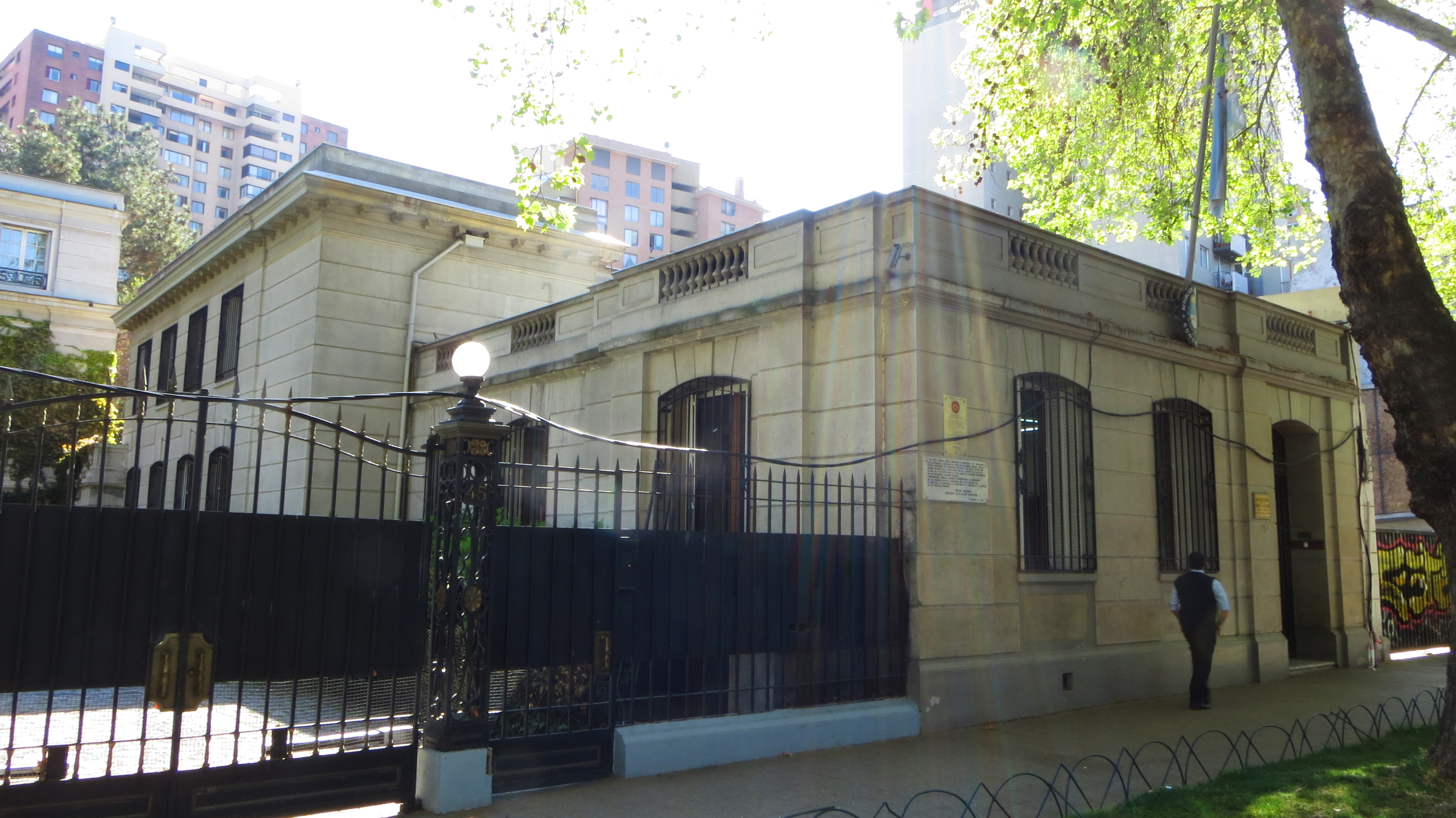
Consulate-General of Argentina in Santiago

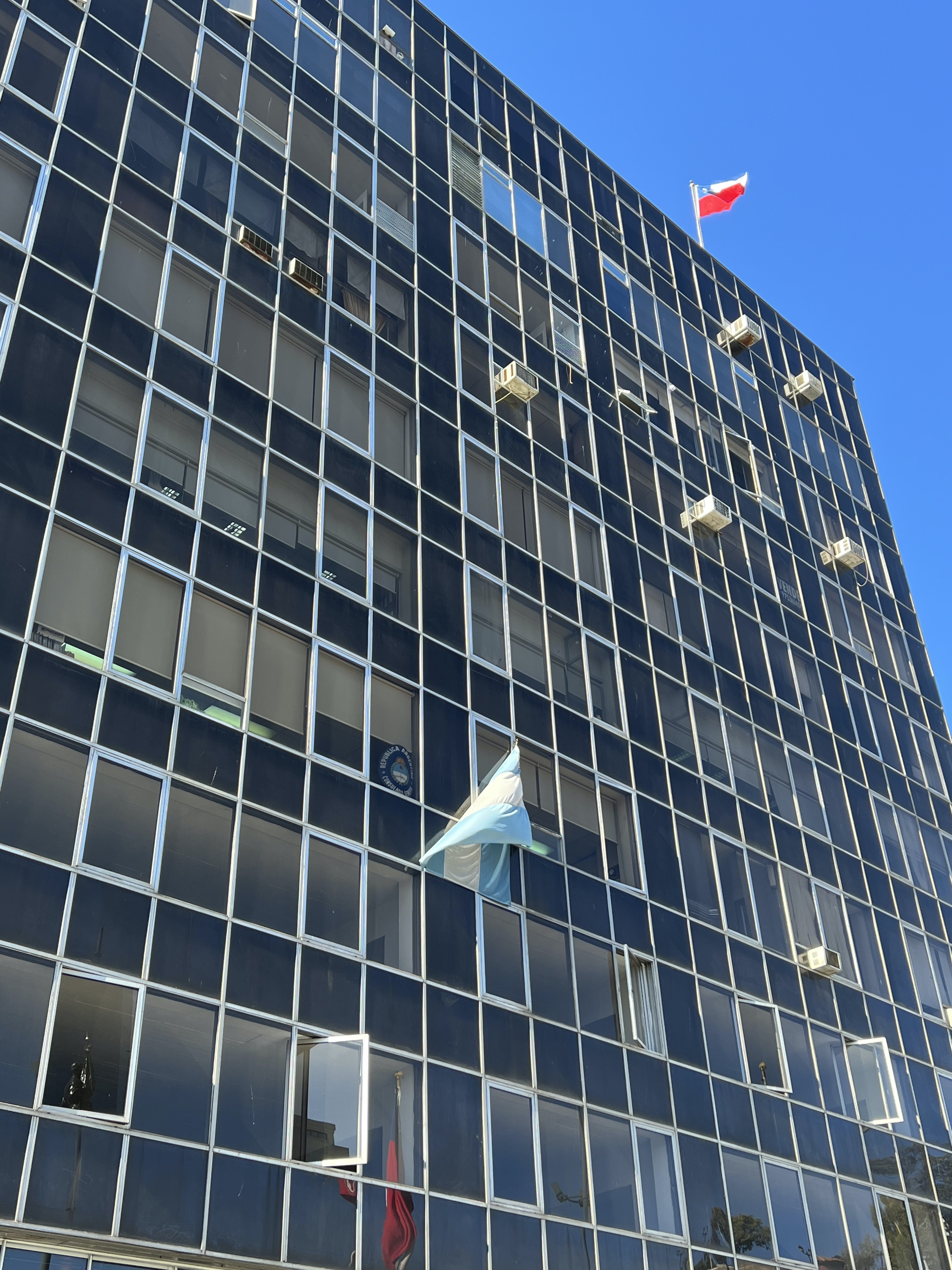
Consulate-General of Argentina in Valparaïso
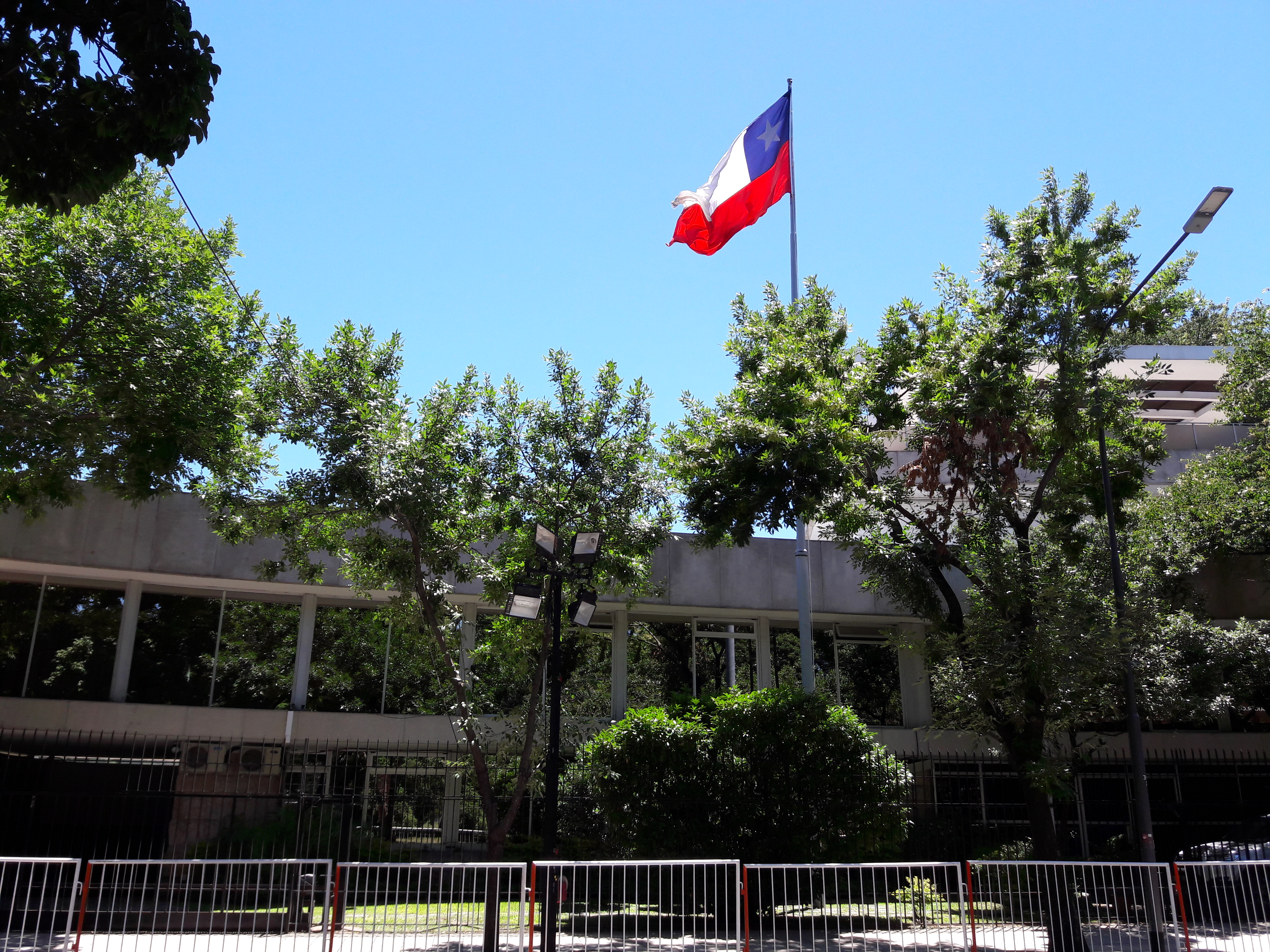
Embassy of Chile in Buenos Aires

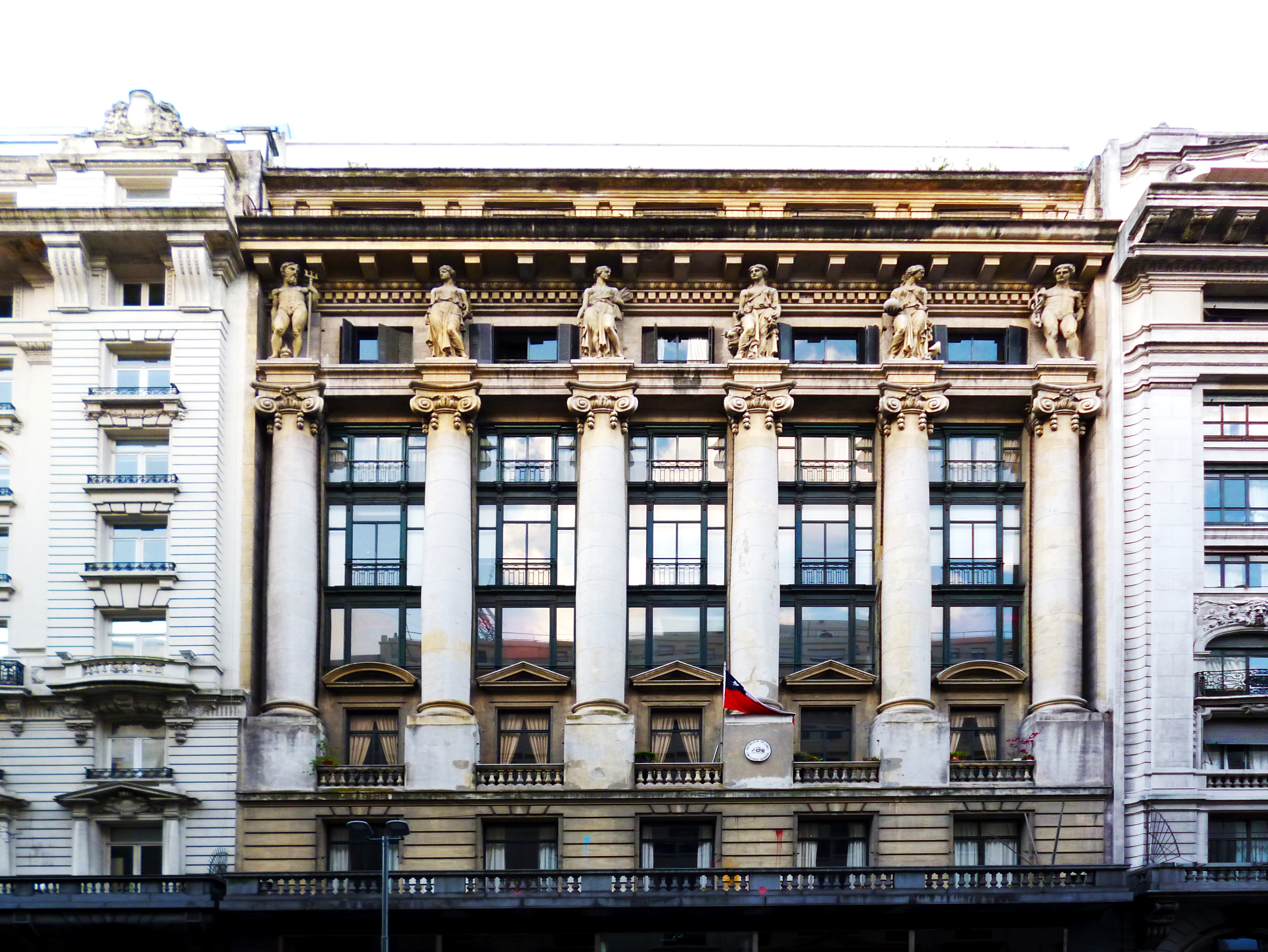
Consulate-General of Chile in Buenos Aires

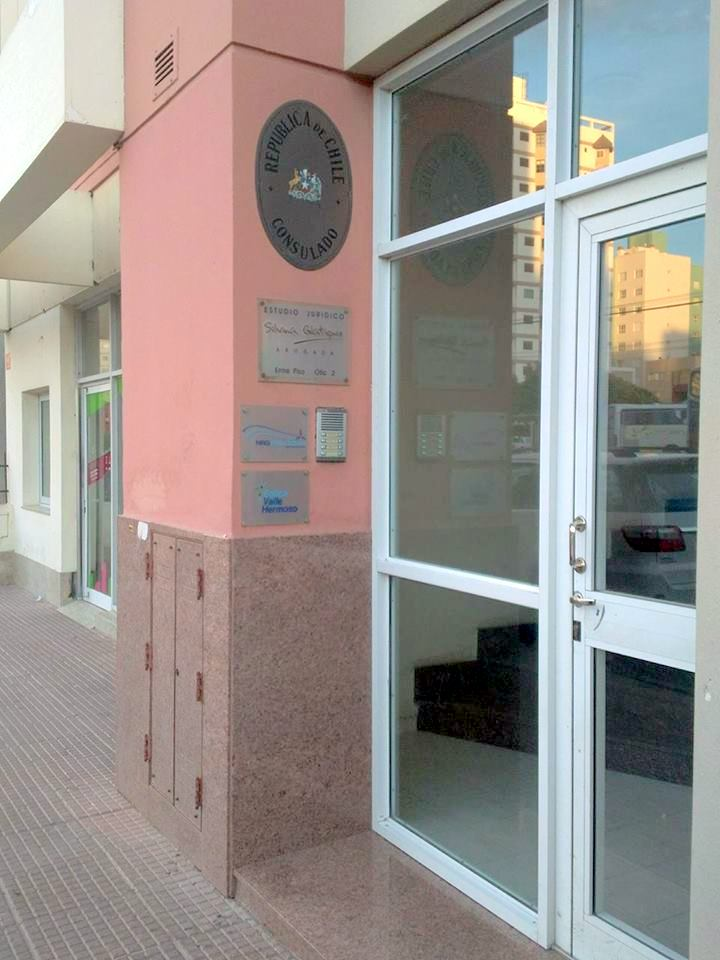
Consulate-General of Chile in Comodoro Rivadavia

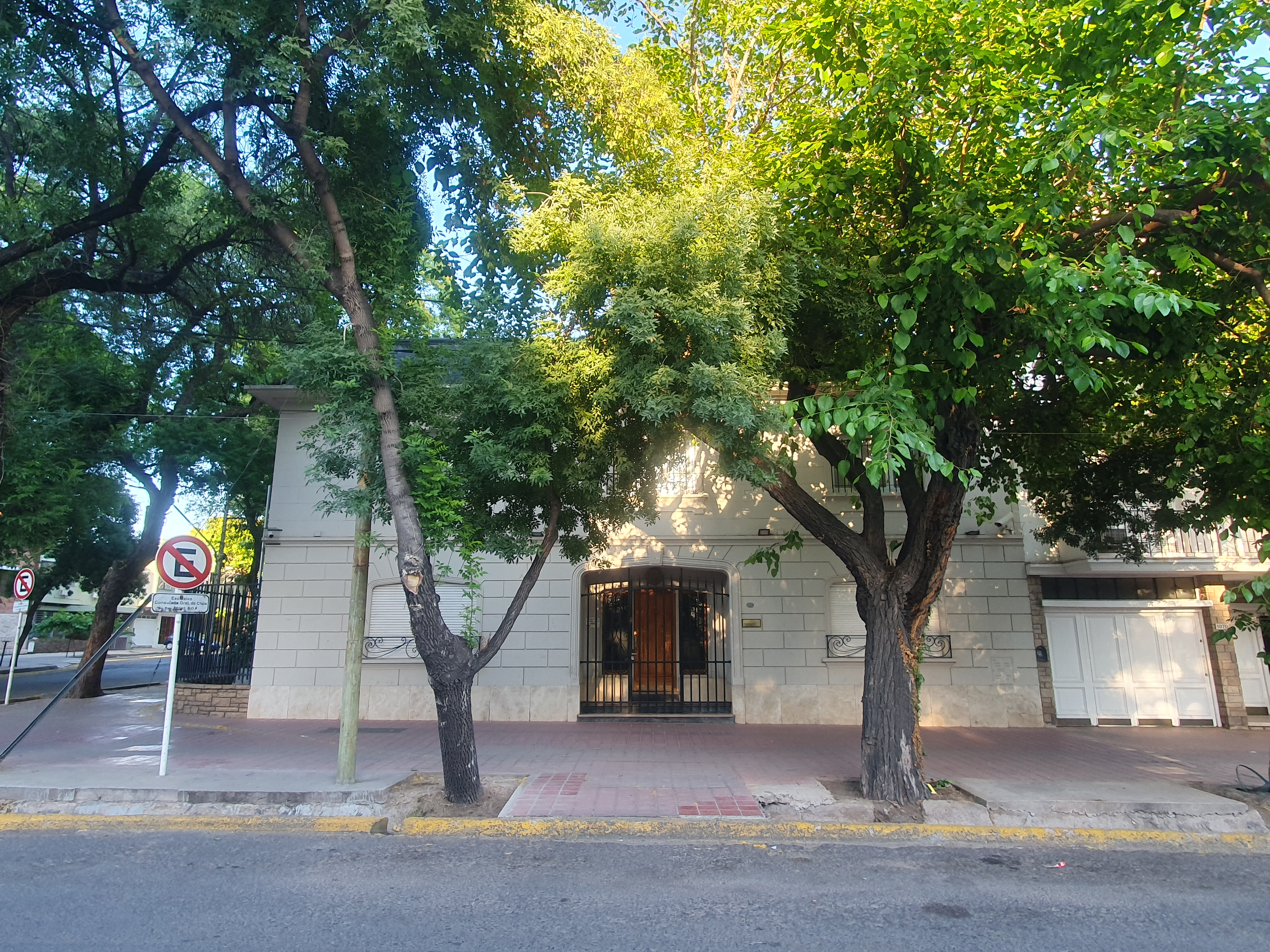
Consulate-General of Chile in Mendoza

== See also ==
- Laguna del Desierto incident
- Southern Patagonian Ice Field dispute
- Beagle conflict
- Puna de Atacama dispute
- Argentina–Chile border
- ABC countries
- Foreign relations of Argentina
- Foreign relations of Chile
- Argentines in Chile
- Chilean Argentines
- List of ambassadors of Argentina to Chile
