= Potreros of the Andes dispute =

19th Century territorial and diplomatic conflict between Argentina and Chile

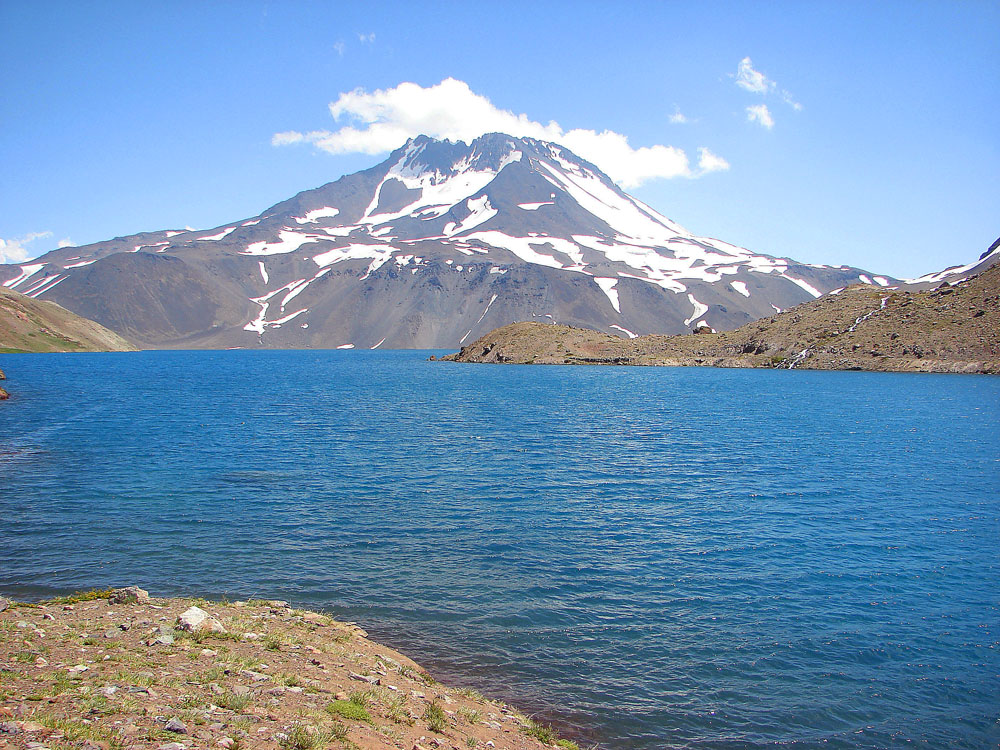
Lake Teno or Planchon, in the mountainous area of Maule, Chile

The Potreros of the Andes dispute (Cuestión de los potreros de cordillera in Spanish) was a territorial and diplomatic conflict between Chile and Argentina in the 19th Century, in which an incident occurred in March 1845 involving the Chilean rancher Manuel Jirón from the Maule Province and Argentine authorities from the Mendoza Province in the area of the Andes.

== History ==
In the context of the tensions between the unitary and federal sides in River Plate politics, the presence of exiles from this country in Chile, and the cutting of commercial traffic with Mendoza ordered on April 13, 1842, by the Chilean president Manuel Bulnes, and the anger of the Mendocino governor José Félix Aldao (from the federal side of Juan Manuel de Rosas), a tense event occurs in March 1845, when the Chilean cattle rancher residing in Talca, Manuel Jirón, is approached by a gang of ten or twelve Argentine rustlers coming from Cuyo in his hacienda. They requested a payment of money in the name of the Governor's Office of Mendoza. They asked for payment for the cattle grazing that Jirón was doing in the potreros of El Yeso, Los Ángeles, Valenzuela and Montañés.

Jiron paid the amount when they threatened to take away his animals, which he later confirmed to the Chilean authorities, expecting compensation for the money. The incident was known as the "mountain potreros issue".

The territory where this occurred is located south of the Diamante River in the mountainous area of Talca, so the territory was understood by Jiron as part of Chilean jurisdiction.

The Municipality of Talca was in charge of protecting the cattle ranchers in the area, and the investigation of the case showed that the aggressors came from San Rafael de Mendoza Fortress.

The Government of Chile sent a note of protest to the Government of Argentina saying:

From the inquiry which by order of this Government has been made, it appears that the pastures are situated in Chilean territory, without any doubt having arisen on this point up to the present, both from the situation of the places, and from the immemorial possession of Chilean citizens, from the recognition of the bordering Indians, from history, tradition, and from whatever titles may be alleged in favor of the rights of sovereignty and property. Not only, therefore, has an illegal act of force and depredation been committed against Chilean citizens, but also an attack against the sovereignty of this Republic and an outrageous violation of its territory.

To which Argentina did not protest.

On December 4, 1846, a technical commission was created in Buenos Aires, composed of Carmen José Domínguez and Lieutenant Nicolás Villanueva, which published on April 27, 1847, in which they argued the territories where the incident occurred as Argentine, although not specifying whether or not they belonged to the province of Cuyo, as they were south of the Diamante River:

The Llaretas and Planchón mountain ranges, which are designated by the attached plan, are an extension of the previous ones, and the Valenzuela, Montañés, Yeso and Los Ángeles valleys, which are in the same situation as that of Tunuyán, cannot by any means be considered an integral part of Chilean territory

— 27 April 1847, Technical Commission, Buenos Aires

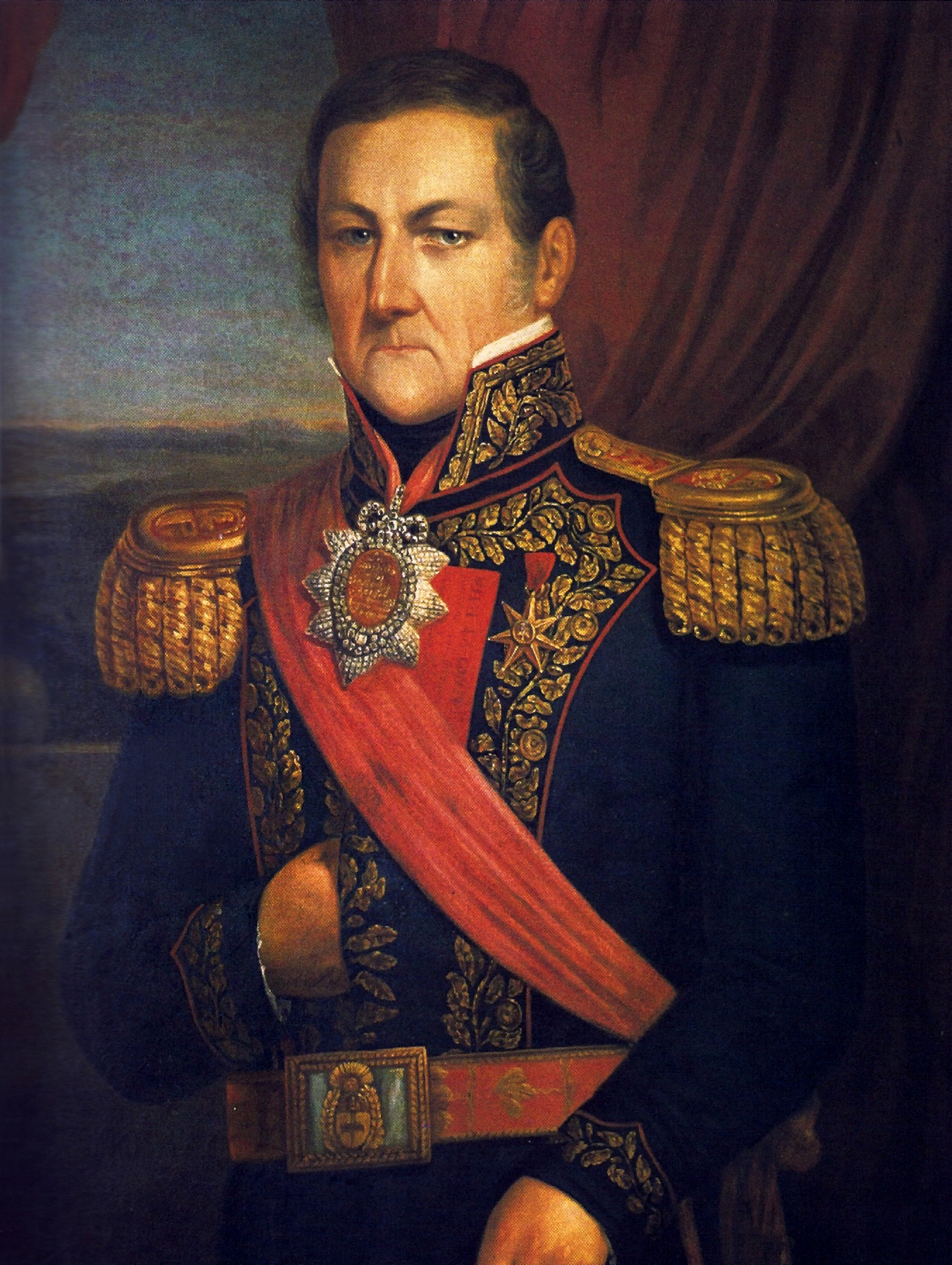
Argentine president, Juan Manuel de Rosas

The Argentine president, Juan Manuel de Rosas, sent officials to tax Talca ranchers in the area in question in 1847 and 1848. By then he had already resolved to incorporate into his country the territory south of the Diamante River to the Río Negro, most of which he knew after his 1833 expeditions.

After the 1881 treaty the boundary divided the disputed area with the areas of Valle Hermoso, Las Leñas and the eastern sector of Paso Potrerillos for Argentina, and the lands near Curicó of Potrero Grande, Potrero Chico, El Planchón, Teno Lagoons, those of the Maule river basin, such as the Maule river basin, such as the lagoon and river of La Invernada, and the sector of El Colorado for Chile.

== See also ==
- Potrero (landform)
- 1856 Argentina–Chile treaty
- Uti possidetis juris
- 1826 Chile–United Provinces of the Río de la Plata treaty
- East Patagonia, Tierra del Fuego and Strait of Magellan dispute
