= 1826 Chile–United Provinces of the Río de la Plata treaty =

The Treaty of Friendship, Alliance, Trade and Navigation between Chile and the United Provinces of the Río de la Plata (Spanish: Tratado de Amistad, Alianza, Comercio y Navegación entre Chile y las Provincias Unidas del Río de la Plata) was a diplomatic agreement signed on November 20, 1826 in Santiago, Chile. Its aim was to formalize bilateral relations between both republics after their emancipation from Spain. However, the treaty was never ratified by Chile and therefore never entered into force.

== Historical context ==
After the Spanish American wars of independence, Chile and the United Provinces of the Río de la Plata (modern-day Argentina) sought to strengthen their relations through formal agreements. Both nations shared common interests in defending their sovereignty and enhancing mutual cooperation.

== Content ==
The treaty comprised 20 articles covering various aspects of the bilateral relationship. It established perpetual friendship and a mutual defensive alliance to protect their independence against any foreign domination. Both republics committed to guaranteeing the integrity of their territories under the principle of uti possidetis iuris of 1810, as stated in Article 3. This principle holds that newly independent American states should retain the borders they had as colonies at the onset of the independence wars. The agreement also called for joint action against any foreign power that attempted to alter their recognized borders either prior to emancipation or later through special treaties.

The treaty stipulated that neither republic would sign peace, neutrality, or trade agreements with the Spanish government unless the independence of all former Spanish American states was first recognized. It promoted full reciprocity in trade and navigation relations, granting citizens of both republics the same rights and privileges as nationals in the country where they resided. It also included exemptions for citizens in each other's territory, such as exemption from mandatory military service and forced loans.

== Ratification and consequences ==
Despite the treaty's signing, the Chilean Congress did not ratify it due to delays and internal debates. Although Articles 1 and 2 were approved, the full treaty was never sanctioned, and therefore it never entered into force. This limited its practical application and led to the need for future agreements to regulate bilateral relations.

== See also ==
- 1856 Argentina–Chile treaty
- Potreros of the Andes dispute
- East Patagonia, Tierra del Fuego and Strait of Magellan dispute
