= El Salto River =

River in Argentina and Chile

El Salto River Engaño River Tigre River
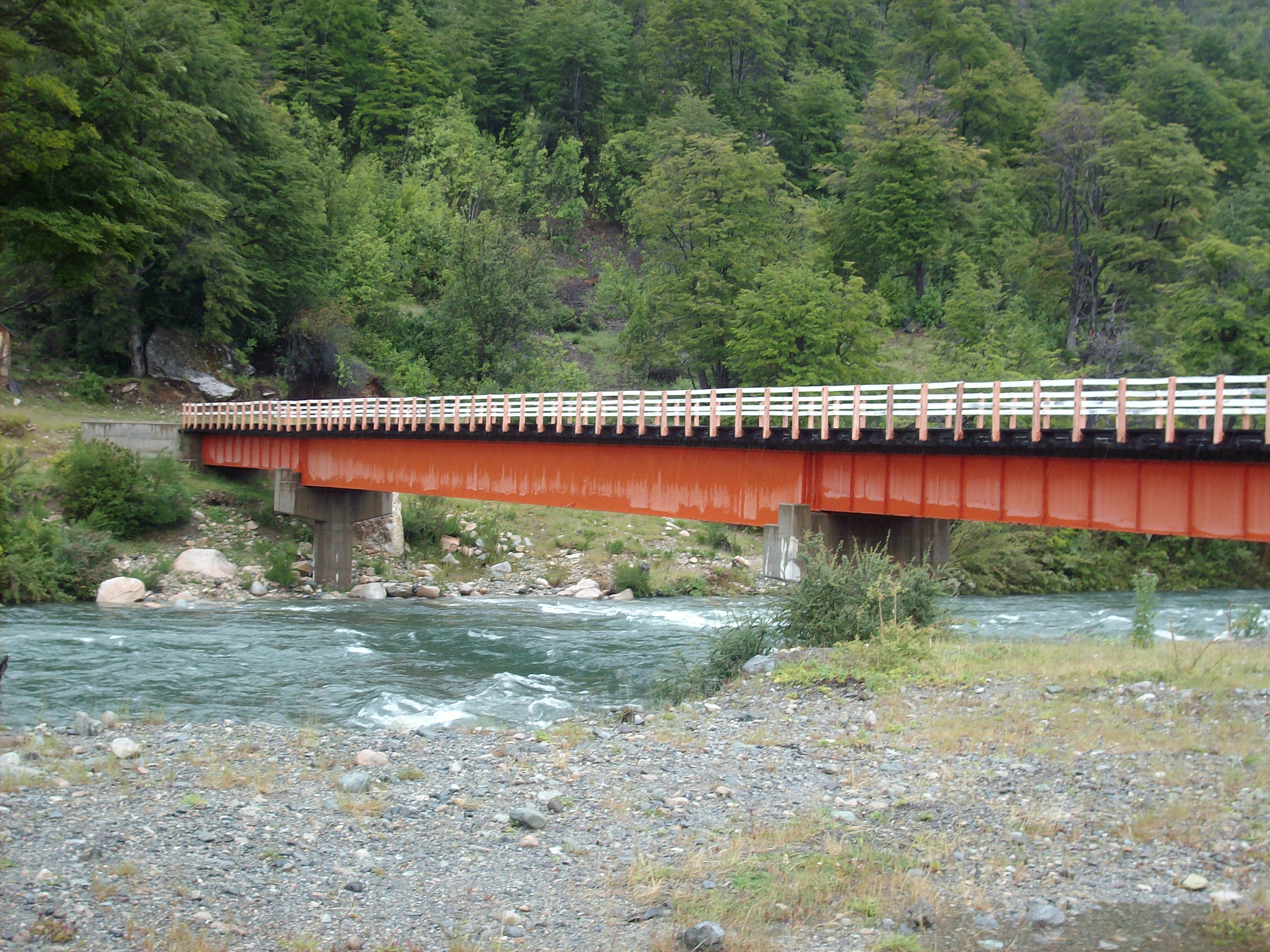
- Bridge over the Tigre River as it passes through Chile.

- Palena River basin

Physical characteristics
- Source: Cerro de la Virgen
  - location: Andes
  - elevation: 1,000 m (3,300 ft)
- Basin size: 500 km^{2} (190 sq mi)
- Discharge
  - average: 35 m^{3}/s (1,200 cu ft/s)

The El Salto River, Engaño River, or Tigre River is a natural watercourse that flows through the Patagonian territories of Argentina (Chubut Province), where it is called "Engaño", and Chile (Los Lagos Region), where it is called "Tigre" or "El Salto". It is a left-bank tributary of the Palena River.

== Course ==
The river originates in Argentina north of Vintter Lake, at Cerro de la Virgen (not to be confused with Picacho de la Virgen), formed by the confluence of several small but abundant streams draining from lakes situated around 1,000 m (3,300 ft) above sea level, collectively known as the Lagunas del Río Engaño. These include Lago Berta inferior and Lago Berta superior.

Once formed, the river flows northwest. Shortly after receiving the abundant Arroyo Las Horquetas, it turns west. Three kilometers later, it receives the waters of Hondo Valley, followed by Arroyo Patria from Laguna Virgen.

It then heads north before crossing the border into Chile, where it is known as Río Salto or Río Tigre. A few kilometers after entering Chile, it abruptly turns southwest until receiving the Río El Azul from the south. At the confluence, the Tigre turns north, receives the outflow from Laguna Negra, and finally turns west to empty into the Palena River west of the town of Palena.

The Argentine portion of the basin, located in Languiñeo Department, covers 320 km^{2} (120 sq mi). Annual precipitation ranges from 1,500 to 2,000 mm. Precipitation is also abundant in Chilean territory.

In the Argentine basin, the Lagunas del Río Engaño include Lago Berta inferior, Lago Berta superior, Lago Engaño, Laguna Cóndor, and Lago Falso Engaño.

== Discharge and regime ==
In normal years (50% probability), the river experiences peak flows during snowmelt in November and December, but in wet years, the highest flows occur in winter.

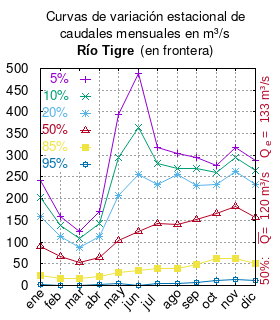
Seasonal variation curves of the Tigre River after crossing the border.

River discharge varies over time, and one way to represent this is through seasonal variation curves, which, based on long-term measurements, statistically predict the minimum discharge with a given probability of exceedance. The ochre-red curve (with ${\color{Red}\vartriangle}$) shows monthly discharges with 50% exceedance probability—meaning half the measured flows in that month are higher and half lower. This is the median, denoted Q_{e}. The arithmetic mean is the mathematical average, denoted $\overline{Q}$.

Once calculated for each month, both values are aggregated annually and shown in the right-hand column of the diagram. A 5% exceedance probability means the discharge is exceeded only once every 20 years on average; 10% once every 10 years; 20% once every 5 years; 85% fifteen times every 16 years; and 95% seventeen times every 18 years. In other words, 5% represents extremely wet years, and 95% extremely dry years. The flood season indicates whether discharge is driven by rainfall (May–July) or snowmelt (September–January).

== History ==
The river was mistakenly identified by Argentine engineer Gunnar Anfin Lange as the Encuentro River on his 1901 map, submitted by expert Francisco Pascasio Moreno to the tribunal of the 1902 arbitral award, laying the foundation for the Alto Palena–Encuentro River dispute.

The river valley was central to the boundary dispute between Argentina and Chile over the border between markers XVI and XVII north of Vintter Lake (formerly Lake General Paz), resolved on 24 November 1966 by the arbitral award of Queen Elizabeth II. The ruling awarded Argentina the upper basin and Chile the western basin.

While in Argentina, the river is called "Engaño"; upon entering Chile, it has various names. Hans Niemeyer calls it "Salto o Tigre".

Luis Risopatrón calls it "río del Salto" and describes it as:

Salto (Río del). Originates on the slopes of snow-capped massifs, flows north through a valley of ñadis interspersed with springs and small lakes, winding in countless meanders. It carries swift, muddy waters and is bordered by extensive beaches and coirón pampas; the numerous piles of dry wood along its banks testify to the force of its floods. It features a waterfall visible from afar, passes near Laguna El Juncal (separated by a low isthmus 1 km wide, through which floodwaters sometimes spill into the lake), and finally flows into the southern bank of the upper course with a width of 60 m. It irrigates fertile pastures and is one of the main tributaries; its banks offer about 200 km² of land suitable for agriculture and livestock, though heavy frosts occur even in summer, with temperatures often dropping below 0 °C.

Note that in Risopatrón's 1910 map of the area, the Salto and Engaño rivers are incorrectly shown as separated by the Encuentro River.

== Bibliography ==
- Niemeyer F., Hans (1982). Hoyas hidrográficas de Chile, Undécima Región (PDF). Santiago de Chile: Ministry of Public Works (Chile), Dirección General de Aguas. Archived from the original (PDF) on 11 November 2018.
- Risopatrón, Luis (1924). Diccionario jeográfico de Chile. Imprenta Universitaria.
- Dirección General de Aguas (2015). Análisis y modelación hidrológica de la cuenca del río Palena (PDF). Santiago de Chile: Ministry of Public Works (Chile). Archived from the original (PDF) on 11 November 2019.
