= Cerro de la Virgen, Argentina and Chile =

Cerro de la Virgen
- Location within Los Lagos

Highest point
- Elevation: 1,833 m (6,014 ft)
- Prominence: 135 m (443 ft)
- Coordinates: 43°46′30″S 71°40′00″W

Geography
- Location: Languiñeo Department, Chubut Province, Argentina; Palena Commune, Los Lagos Region, Chile
- Parent range: Andes

The Cerro de la Virgen is a mountain on the border between Argentina and Chile, located in Chubut Province (Argentina) and the Palena Commune of the Los Lagos Region (Chile). It was named by Argentine engineer Gunnar Lange in 1902 on his map used in the 1902 arbitral award. It is the source of the El Salto River. Until 1966, Chile claimed the entire mountain, while Argentina considered it a boundary feature during the Alto Palena–Encuentro River dispute. Lange mistakenly identified the El Salto River as the Encuentro River, placing the origin of the latter at Cerro de la Virgen. However, the Encuentro River actually originates from the Picacho de la Virgen, which was named after the homonymous hill. The 1966 arbitral award established it as a boundary peak.

It reaches an elevation of 1,833 meters above sea level, with a topographic prominence of approximately 135 meters above the surrounding terrain. The base of the mountain covers an area of roughly 1.2 km. (Note: The calculation is based on the longest extent of the contour to determine topographic prominence.)

== Characteristics ==
The terrain around Cerro de la Virgen is varied. (Note: Calculation derived from elevation data (DEM 3") from Viewfinder Panoramas within a 10 km radius.) The highest point in the area is 2,050 meters and lies 19.2 km east of the mountain. (Note: Calculation derived from elevation data (DEM 3") from Viewfinder Panoramas.)

Population density in the vicinity is less than 2 inhabitants per square kilometer, and there are no nearby settlements. The region is dominated by mountainous landscapes. (Note: Within 20 km, compared to the average density of the area, per GeoNames.)

Vegetation around Cerro de la Virgen consists mainly of mixed forest. The climate is continental, with an average annual temperature of 2 °C. The warmest month is February, at 12 °C, and the coldest is June, at −6 °C.

Average annual precipitation is 3,085 mm, with December being the wettest month (350 mm) and September the driest (169 mm).
