= Encuentro River =

River in Chile and Argentina

- The Alto Palena–Encuentro River boundary dispute on the map.

- Palena River basin

Location
- Country: Chile; Argentina

Physical characteristics
- Source: Picacho de la Virgen
  - location: Andes
- Mouth: Palena River
  - location: Southern bank of the upper Palena River
- Length: 25 km (16 mi)

The Encuentro River is a natural watercourse that originates in the Picacho de la Virgen and flows generally northward until it empties into the southern bank of the Palena River, forming part of the international boundary between Chile and Argentina in that sector.

== Course ==
The river marks the international boundary between Languiñeo Department (Argentina) and Palena Province (Chile) over a stretch of approximately 25 km (16 mi). It is located near the homonymous international pass.

See also the 1910 map of the area by Luis Risopatrón, Ossandon, and Bolaño, which erroneously depicts the Engaño River as an endorheic basin, whereas the Engaño River actually crosses the border south of the Encuentro River and flows into the El Salto River. As shown in the full map, large areas of the region remained unexplored at the time.

== History ==
Hans Steffen Hoffmann, a German-Chilean explorer, discovered the Encuentro River on 6 January 1894 and described it.

During the 20th century, a territorial dispute arose over part of the river, which was resolved by an arbitral award from Queen Elizabeth II in 1966.

The river was named "Encuentro" (meaning "meeting") because the two groups into which Hans Steffen had divided his expedition to explore the Palena River met there.

Luis Risopatrón described it as follows:

Encuentro (Río del). Of low flow, it descends from the east, confined between vertical but not very high banks, and empties into the southern margin of the upper course of the Palena River. It was named in 1894 because the two parties of Steffen's exploration met there. It forms part of the boundary line with Argentina according to the arbitral award, for which reason a boundary pyramid was erected in 1903 on the slope of a hill rising on the northern bank of the Palena River, opposite its mouth.

The El Salto or Tigre River, which originates at Cerro de la Virgen, was mistakenly identified by Argentine engineer Gunnar Anfin Lange as the Encuentro River on his 1901 map, submitted by expert Francisco Pascasio Moreno to the tribunal of the 1902 arbitral award, laying the groundwork for the dispute. The Picacho de la Virgen was later named by the Chilean Boundary Commission after the homonymous hill named by Lange.

== See also ==
- List of rivers of Chile
- Geography of Chile

== Bibliography ==
- Niemeyer F., Hans. Hoyas hidrográficas de Chile, Undécima Región (PDF). Santiago de Chile: Ministry of Public Works (Chile), Dirección General de Aguas. Archived from the original (PDF) on 11 November 2018.
- Risopatrón, Luis (1924). Diccionario jeográfico de Chile. Imprenta Universitaria.
