= Gunnar Anfin Lange =

Norwegian-Argentine surveyor and cartographer

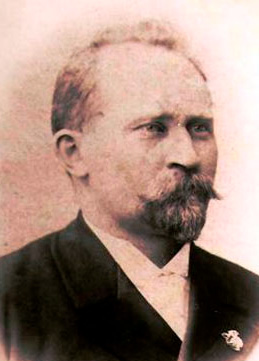
- Born: 21 September 1855; Vestre Aker, Christiania (now Oslo), Norway
- Died: 24 July 1915 (aged 59); General Alvear, Argentina
- Occupations: Engineer, cartographer, surveyor, professor
- Spouse: Berta Juana Dorotea Erfjord
- Children: Norah Lange, Haydée Lange and seven others
- Awards: Knight First Class of the Royal Norwegian Order of Saint Olav

Gunnar Anfin Lange (21 September 1855 – 24 July 1915) was a Norwegian-Argentine engineer, surveyor, and cartographer known for his geographical explorations, topographic surveys, and irrigation projects in Argentina. He was also a professor of topography at the National University of La Plata and a Knight of the Order of St. Olav.

== Biography ==
Gunnar Lange with his family.

Lange was born in Vestre Aker, Christiania (present-day Oslo), Norway, the son of Tycho Didrik Castberg Lange (1823–1881) and Johanne Young (1833–1891). His father belonged to the Lange family, and his mother was the daughter of a Christiania merchant.

He graduated from the Norwegian Military Academy in 1876 as a first lieutenant and completed studies at Den Militære Høiskole in 1879. He later worked as an aspirant in the Norwegian General Staff and attained the rank of first lieutenant in 1883. In 1878, he participated in railway studies in Bulgaria, and in 1884 he moved to the United States, where he worked as a surveyor.

In 1885, he became involved in the conflict between Honduras and El Salvador, rising to the ranks of artillery captain and lieutenant colonel. After the war, he worked for the US Geodetic Survey on measurements in the Sierra Nevada.

== Career in Argentina ==
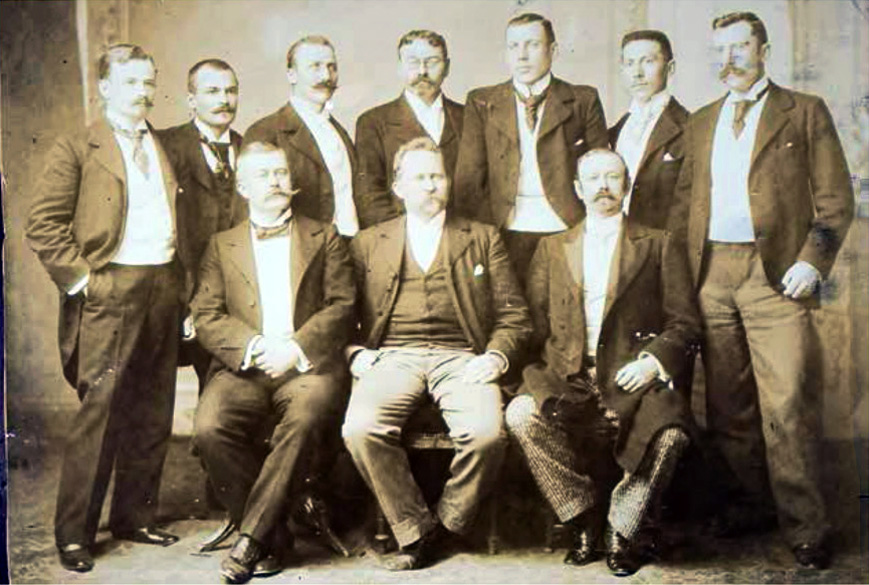
Gunardo Lange as members of the Topographical Section of the Museum of La Plata (second seated).

In 1886, Lange moved to Argentina, hired to conduct topographic measurements and railway studies in Tucumán and Catamarca. In 1888, he was appointed head of the General Cadastre Commission of Catamarca, producing the province's first complete map.

After a brief return to Norway, he came back to Argentina in 1890. In 1892, he became head of the Topographic Section at the La Plata Museum, serving as the main assistant to expert Francisco Pascasio Moreno. He corrected and published maps of various regions, including Mendoza, and, together with Enrique Wolff, rapidly produced a topographic-geological plan of the Atuel and Diamante rivers.

He became an Argentine citizen in 1896, adopting the name Gunardo Lange. That same year, he married Berta Juana Dorotea Erfjord (1875–1960), daughter of Norwegian shipping agent Christian Erfjord and Irishwoman Catalina Furlong. They had nine children, including the renowned poet and novelist Norah Lange and translator Haydée Lange, a friend of Jorge Luis Borges.

Between 1897 and 1899, he served as assistant and second-in-command of the Argentine-Chilean Boundary Commission and participated in the Irrigation Study Commission for the Negro and Colorado rivers. From 1902 to 1909, he directed the Hydrometry Section of the National Meteorological Observatory and taught topography at the Provincial University of La Plata, where he collaborated with Norwegian mountaineer Eilert Sundt.

In the map Lange produced in 1901 as part of the 1902 arbitral award, he confused the Encuentro River (mentioned in the award) with the El Salto River, placing the origin of the former at Cerro de la Virgen. However, the Encuentro River actually originates from Picacho de la Virgen, named after the homonymous hill, which became a key factor in the Alto Palena–Encuentro River dispute. That dispute was resolved in 1966 with another arbitral award.

== Explorations and honors ==
Lange conducted significant explorations, including a 650 km journey along the Pilcomayo River (1906–1909), documented in a bilingual book. He published the Manual de Topografía (1898), a university reference text for decades. In 1909, he was decorated as Knight First Class of the Order of St. Olav.

That same year, he resigned from his positions in Buenos Aires and La Plata to manage the "Colonia Alvear" company in Mendoza on behalf of his friend and partner Pedro Christophersen. In General Alvear, he became mayor, and the town's main avenue is now named in his honor.

== Death ==
Gunnar Anfin Lange died on 24 July 1915 in General Alvear, aged 60. His remains were transferred and buried on 12 August at the Dissidents' Cemetery in Buenos Aires. At his farewell, Pedro Christophersen compared him to "an oak that had finally fallen," highlighting his strength and contributions to progress. The Semanario La Verdad of General Alvear described the massive wake and funeral procession that departed from the Municipal Building, reflecting the community's respect and appreciation.

== See also ==
- Norah Lange
- Francisco Moreno
