= Puna de Atacama dispute =

Territorial dispute between Chile and Argentina

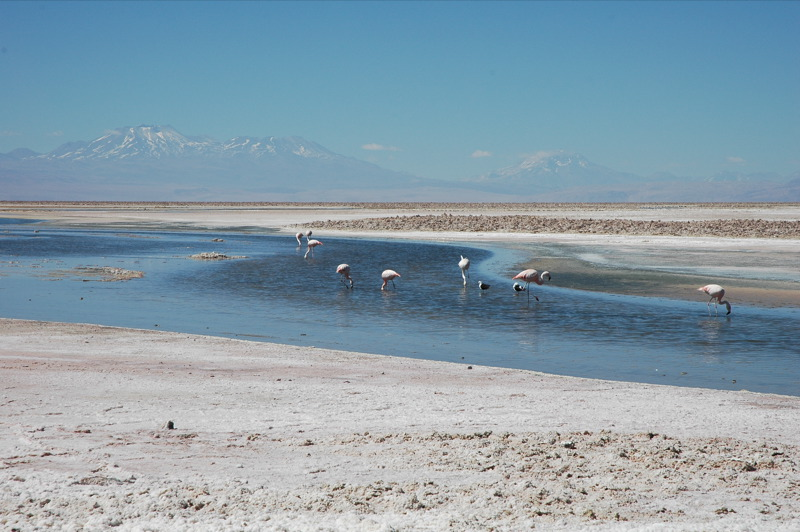
Salar de Atacama with Pular (leftmost), Cerro Pajonales (left) and Socompa (right) in the distance. The 1899 border runs through Socompa.

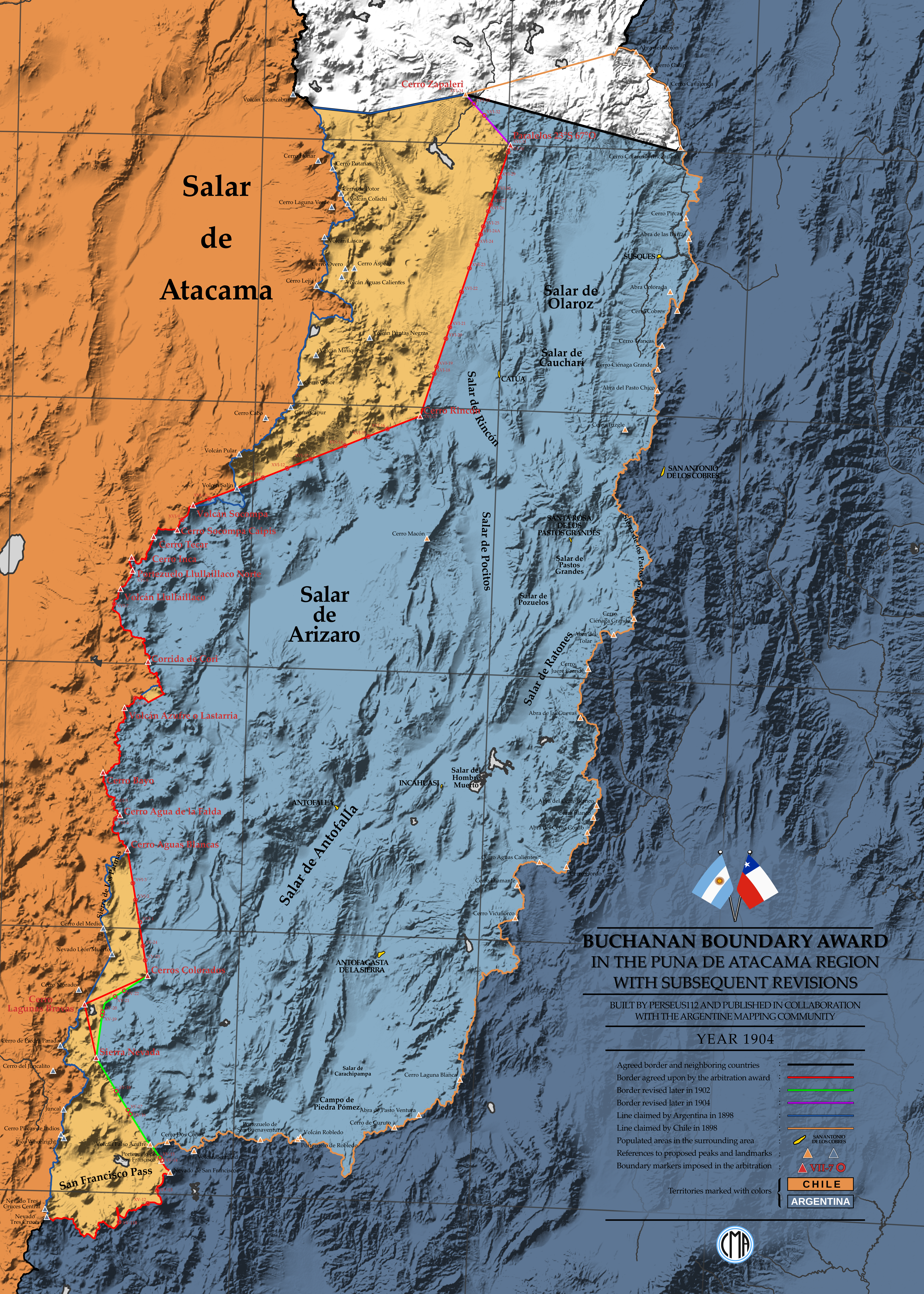
Map of the territories claimed by Argentina and Chile between 1898 and 1904 during the dispute over the Puna de Atacama.

The Puna de Atacama dispute, sometimes referred to as Puna de Atacama Lawsuit (Spanish: Litigio de la Puna de Atacama), was a border dispute involving Argentina, Chile and Bolivia in the 19th century over the arid high plateau of Puna de Atacama located about 4500 meters above the sea around the current borders of the three countries.

The dispute originated with the Chilean annexation of the Bolivian Litoral Department in 1879 during the War of the Pacific. That year, the Chilean Army occupied San Pedro de Atacama, the main settlement of the current Chilean part of Puna de Atacama. By 1884, Bolivia and its ally Peru had lost the war, and Argentina communicated to the Chilean government that the border line in the Puna was still a pending issue between Argentina and Bolivia. Chile answered that the Puna de Atacama still belonged to Bolivia. The same year, Argentina occupied Pastos Grandes in the Puna.

Map of each part of the border defined in different years.

Simplified map of some territorial changes as result of the War of the Pacific and the Puna de Atacama lawsuit

Bolivia had still not signed any peace treaty with Chile until the Treaty of Peace and Friendship of 1904. In the light that influential Bolivian politicians considered the Litoral Province to be lost forever, the adjacent Puna de Atacama appeared to be a remote, mountainous and arid place that was difficult to defend. That prompted the Bolivian government to use it as a tool for to obtaining benefits from both Chile and Argentina. That led to the signature of two contradictory treaties in which Bolivia granted Argentina and Chile overlapping areas:

- On May 10, 1889, a secret treaty between the Argentine minister Norberto Quirno Costa and the Bolivian envoy Santiago Vaca Guzmán was signed in Buenos Aires. The treaty established that Argentina renounced to its claims on Tarija in exchange for all the Bolivian Puna de Atacama (see Tarija dispute).
- On May 19, 1891, the Matta-Reyes Protocol was signed between Chile and Bolivia. It recognised the Bolivian territories occupied by Chile since the War of the Pacific as ceded to Chile, including those in the Puna de Atacama, in exchange for defaulting some debts.

On November 2, 1898, Argentina and Chile signed two documents in which they decided to convene a conference to define the border in Buenos Aires with delegates of both countries. If there was no agreement, a Chilean and Argentine delegate and the United States minister to Argentina, William Buchanan, would decide. As foreseen, there was no accord at the conference, and Buchanan proceeded with the delegates of Chile, Enrique Mac Iver, and Argentina José Evaristo Uriburu, to define the border.

Of the 75,000 km^{2} in dispute, 64,000 (85%) were awarded to Argentina and 11,000 (15%) to Chile.
