= 1856 Argentina–Chile treaty =

1856 treaty between Chile and Argentina

Map of the East Patagonia, Tierra del Fuego and Strait of Magellan Dispute. In blue and green are the boundaries claimed by Argentinian and Chilean historians respectably as uti possidetis iuris in Patagonia.

The Treaty of Peace, Friendship, Commerce and Navigation of 1856 between Chile and Argentina (Spanish: Tratado de paz, amistad, comercio y navegación entre la República de Chile y la Confederación Argentina) was the first boundary treaty between Argentina and Chile. Article 39 of the treaty proposed the use of direct diplomatic negotiations and arbitration to resolve disputes. It established that the boundaries should be based on the uti possidetis principle based on what each country possessed before the Chilean and Argentine wars of independence beginning in 1810. It also postponed the solution of the East Patagonia, Tierra del Fuego and Strait of Magellan Dispute into the future. Article 40 of this treaty established a 12-year limit on the effect of its articles about commerce and navigation. The Boundary treaty of 1881 between Chile and Argentina mentions this treaty to say that the later treaty is "in fulfillment" of Section 39 of this treaty.

== Background ==
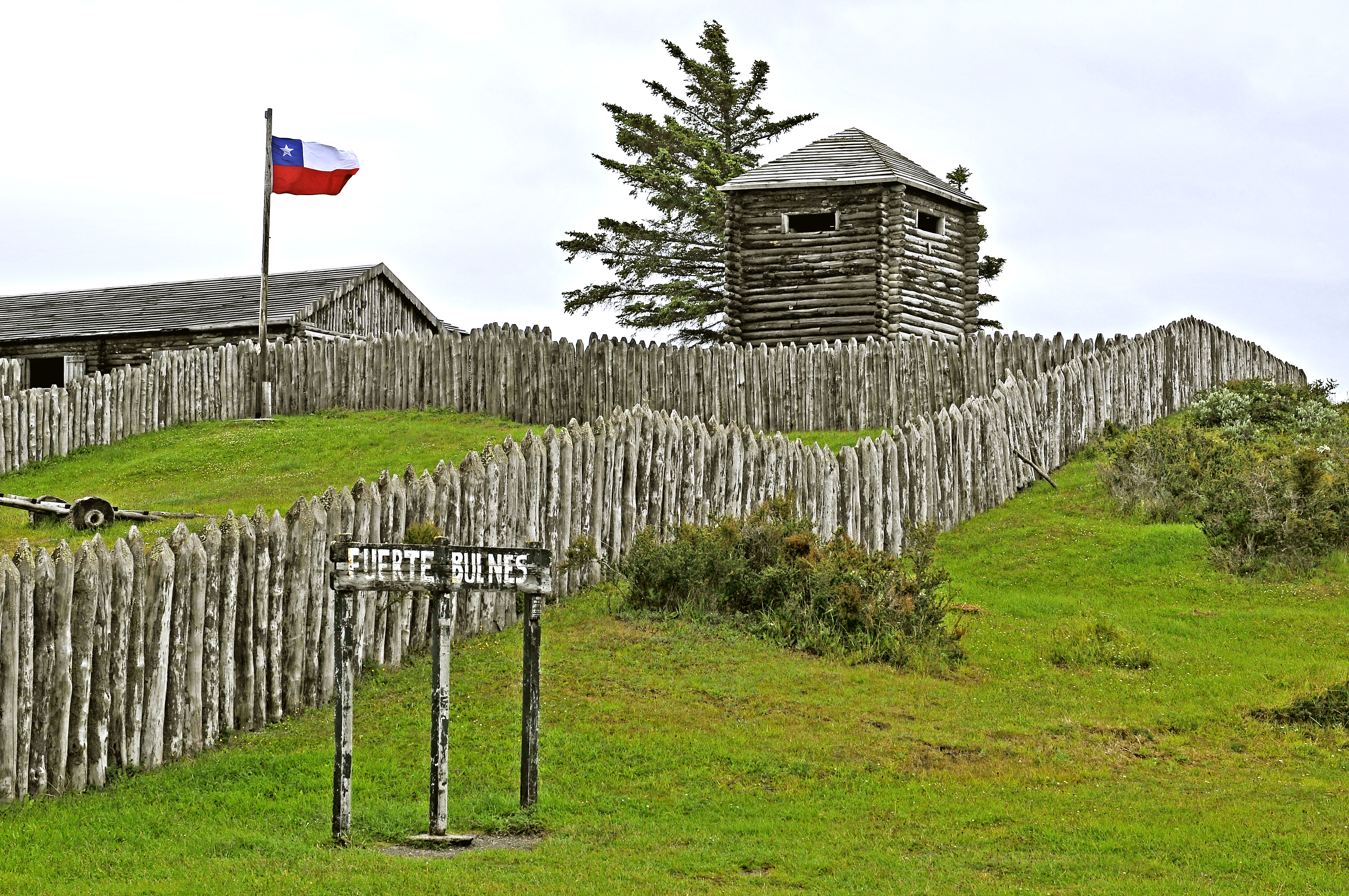
Chile founded Fort Bulnes on the coast of the Brunswick Peninsula in 1843 to take possession of the Strait of Magellan and the surrounding territory, prompting diplomatic protests from Argentina.

The government of President Manuel Bulnes dispatched the schooner Ancud to take possession of the Strait of Magellan on behalf of Chile. The intendant of Chiloé, Domingo Espiñeira, organized and directed the operations, which were carried out by Frigate Captain John Williams Wilson. On September 21, 1843, he completed the takeover of the Strait of Magellan at the historic site of Puerto del Hambre, founding Fort Bulnes.

Between 1852 and 1855, both countries engaged in a highly detailed historical and geographical debate, amassing a significant collection of documents to support their respective claims.

The Chilean minister Antonio Varas, upon learning of the historical studies published by Miguel Luis Amunátegui in 1853, regarded them as a revelation. Although these studies claimed the uti possidetis iuris boundary to be the same as shown in the map by Juan de la Cruz Cano y Olmedilla of 1775 (excluding the Cuyo region, which had been transferred to the jurisdiction of Buenos Aires by the King of Spain in 1776), the Chilean government sought to assert sovereignty up to the Río Negro. Upon learning of Amunátegui’s book, the Argentine government tasked Dalmacio Vélez Sarsfield in 1855 with drafting a response, which was subsequently countered by Amunátegui. The following year, amidst these academic disputes tied to the governments of both countries, the treaty was signed.

== Sources ==
Tratado de paz, amistad, comercio y navegación entre la República de Chile y la Confederación Argentina Wikisource

== See also ==
- Potreros of the Andes dispute
- 1826 Chile–United Provinces of the Río de la Plata treaty
- East Patagonia, Tierra del Fuego and Strait of Magellan dispute
