= Tarija dispute =

Argentinian territorial claims on Tarija in the 19th Century

The Tarija dispute was a diplomatic dispute between Bolivia and the Argentine Confederation in the 19th century. It revolved around the sovereignty of the region of Tarija, claimed by both nations after their independence from Spain. The conflict persisted until 1898, when a definitive agreement was reached.

== Background ==
The territory of Tarija belonged to the Audiencia of Charcas during colonial times. After the May Revolution in 1810, the region sent a representative to the Primera Junta in Buenos Aires. However, after various political and military developments during the independence wars, Bolivia incorporated Tarija, while Argentina continued to assert its claim over the area.

== Bilateral tensions ==
Argentina maintained a claim on Tarija until the Argentine–Bolivian boundary treaty of 1889, in which it renounced its rights to the region in exchange for the recognition of other territorial claims. Despite this, diplomatic negotiations continued due to overlapping border definitions and regional instability.

In 1898, the Argentine representative Benjamín Paz and Bolivian envoy José María Quijarro signed a treaty ratifying Bolivian sovereignty over Tarija and reaffirming borders established in 1889.

== End of the dispute ==
The resolution of the Tarija dispute helped stabilize relations between Argentina and Bolivia, enabling both nations to consolidate their national borders and focus on internal development.

By the Quirno Costa–Vaca Guzmán Treaty of 10 May 1889, slightly modified in 1891 and put into effect on 10 March 1893, the border was drawn in such a way that Argentina implicitly renounced its claim over Tarija. In compensation, Bolivia ceded a territory it had lost militarily: the Puna de Atacama, which was under Chilean control after the War of the Pacific. A later ruling by U.S. ambassador to Argentina William Buchanan awarded Argentina 60,000 out of the 75,000 km^{2} of the disputed Puna de Atacama region, with the remainder going to Chile.

During the border demarcation, it was discovered that the Bolivian town of Yacuiba, located in the northeast of Salta Province, lay south of the 22nd parallel south—not north of it as shown in the maps. As a result, a protocol was signed on 28 January 1904, modifying the border line near Yacuiba so that the town and its surrounding area would remain in Bolivian territory. Argentina was compensated with access to the Santa Victoria River in the northwest of Salta. The borders were finally adjusted by the "Definitive Border Treaty Diez de Medina–Ramón Carrillo" of 9 July 1925.

== See also ==
- Puna de Atacama dispute
