= Picacho de la Virgen =

- Pico Virgen
- Location within Chubut

Highest point
- Coordinates: 43°46′16″S 71°39′32″W

Geography
- Location: Río Engaño Provincial Reserve, Languiñeo Department, Chubut Province, Argentina
- Parent range: Cordón de las Vírgenes, Andes

The Picacho de la Virgen or Pico Virgen is a mountain located in the Río Engaño Provincial Reserve, Languiñeo Department, Chubut Province, Argentina. Until 1966, it was claimed by Chile as a boundary peak. It is the source of the Encuentro River and part of the Cordón de las Vírgenes.

== History ==
The mountain was part of the Alto Palena–Encuentro River dispute, in which Chile claimed it as a boundary feature because it is the birthplace of the Encuentro River, as described in the works of Hans Steffen. The nearby Cerro de la Virgen is the source of the El Salto or Tigre River. This latter river was mistakenly identified by Argentine engineer Gunnar Anfin Lange as the Encuentro River on his 1901 map, submitted by expert Francisco Pascasio Moreno to the tribunal of the 1902 arbitral award, laying the groundwork for the dispute.

The mountain was named by the Chilean Boundary Commission in 1955, after Chilean General Eduardo Saavedra Rojas identified it as the true source of the Encuentro River, denouncing the cartography of the area as erroneous. The nearby hill to the southwest of the same name was first named by Gunnar Lange when he drew up the 1901 map; prior to this, no such names existed. The Picacho de la Virgen (still unnamed at the time) was identified by the British demarcator Bertram Dickson as the source of the Encuentro River in 1903, describing it as located farther east than the boundary marker (hito) 17 placed during the demarcation.
