= Potrero Grande =

- Location within Panama
- Coordinates: 8°52′48″N 79°49′48″W
- Country: Panama
- Province: Panamá

Population (2008)
  - Total: 4 508

Potrero Grande is a town in the Panamá Province of Panama.

== Sources ==
- World Gazetteer: Panama – World-Gazetteer.com
