= Luis Risopatrón =

Chilean explorer

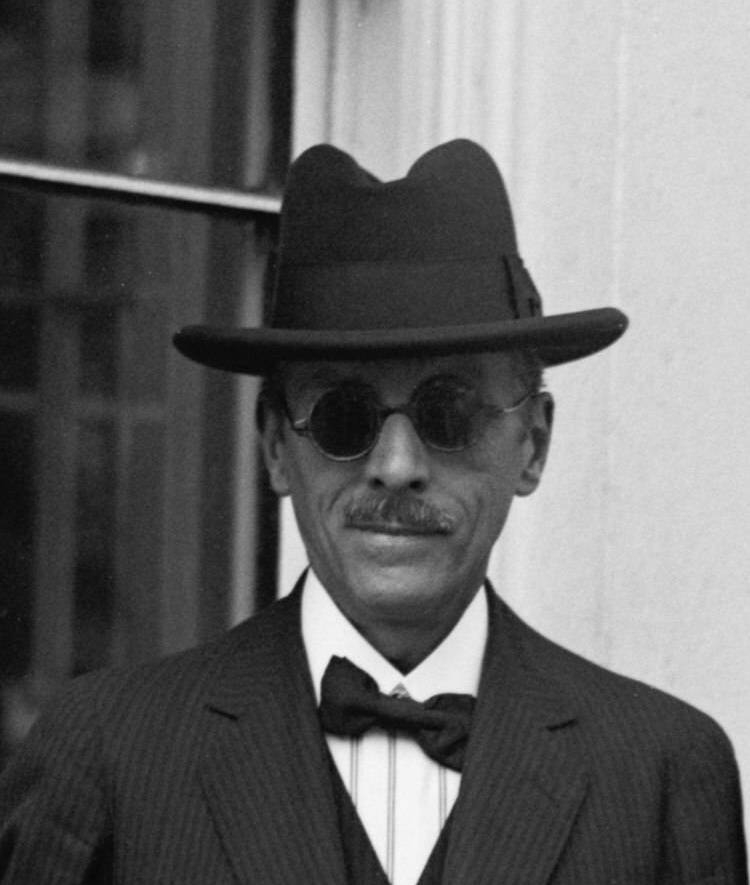

Luis Risopatrón (1869-1930) was an engineer, explorer, geographer and cartographer from Chile. His 958 page geographical dictionary of Chile was published in 1924. The Risopatrón Base in the Antarctic is named for him. The American Geographical Society in New York awarded him the David Livingstone Centenary Gold Medal, its highest honor at the time, on September 14, 1926. As a child Patrón, was an admirer of Livingstone.

Diccionario Jeografico de Chile, readable pdf

Risopatrón's father, Francisco Risopatrón, was a hydraulic engineer and naturalist. His dictionary followed on Francisco Solano Astaburuaga's Geographical Dictionary of the Republic of Chile published in 1867. Luis Risopatrón was a founding member of the Chilean Society of History and Geography.

He coined the terminology Antarctandes referring to the continuation of the Andes mountain beneath the Drake Passage and into Antarctica.

== Publishings ==
- La antártida Americana (1908)
- Diccionario Jeografico de Chile (1924)
