= Eimar Soot =

Norwegian engineer and topographer (1857–1909)

Enrique Eimar Soot
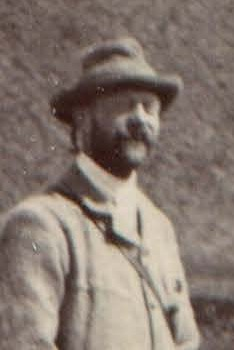
- Born: Olaf Holm Eimar Soot; February 16, 1857; Sørum, Akershus, Norway
- Died: October 15, 1909 (aged 52)
- Occupations: Engineer, topographer

Enrique Eimar Soot (born Olaf Holm Eimar Soot; 16 February 1857 – 15 October 1909) was a Norwegian engineer and topographer who worked in Argentina in the late nineteenth and early twentieth centuries. He participated in scientific expeditions and in the demarcation of the border between Argentina and Chile following the 1902 arbitral award that settled the territorial dispute between the two countries.

== Biography ==
Olaf Holm Eimar Soot was born on 16 February 1857 in Sørum, in the county of Akershus, Norway (now part of the municipality of Lillestrøm). He completed the artium (a university preparatory examination equivalent to secondary graduation) in 1876 and later trained as an engineer.

Toward the end of the nineteenth century he emigrated to Argentina, where he worked as a topographer—combining the roles of surveyor and cartographer—in scientific exploration and mapping projects in the Patagonia and Andes regions. He joined the Topographic Section of the La Plata Museum and collaborated with the Argentine Boundary Commission led by Francisco Pascasio Moreno.

During these expeditions he worked alongside other European scientists and technicians active in Argentina, including Norwegian topographers Adolfo Schiörbeck and Theodor Arneberg, as well as the Swiss-born naturalist Santiago Roth. Their missions involved topographical, geological and exploratory work in several regions of the country, including Catamarca, La Rioja, San Juan, Río Negro, and areas around the Limay River and Collón Curá River, as well as the surroundings of Nahuel Huapi Lake.

In 1897 he was officially appointed as an assistant in the Argentine commission responsible for the demarcation of the boundary with Chile. He carried out various topographic measurements in the Andean region, some of which were recorded in Moreno's publications, including barometric observations and altitude measurements at sites such as Angostura and the Chilchuma stream.

== Participation in the demarcation of the 1902 award ==
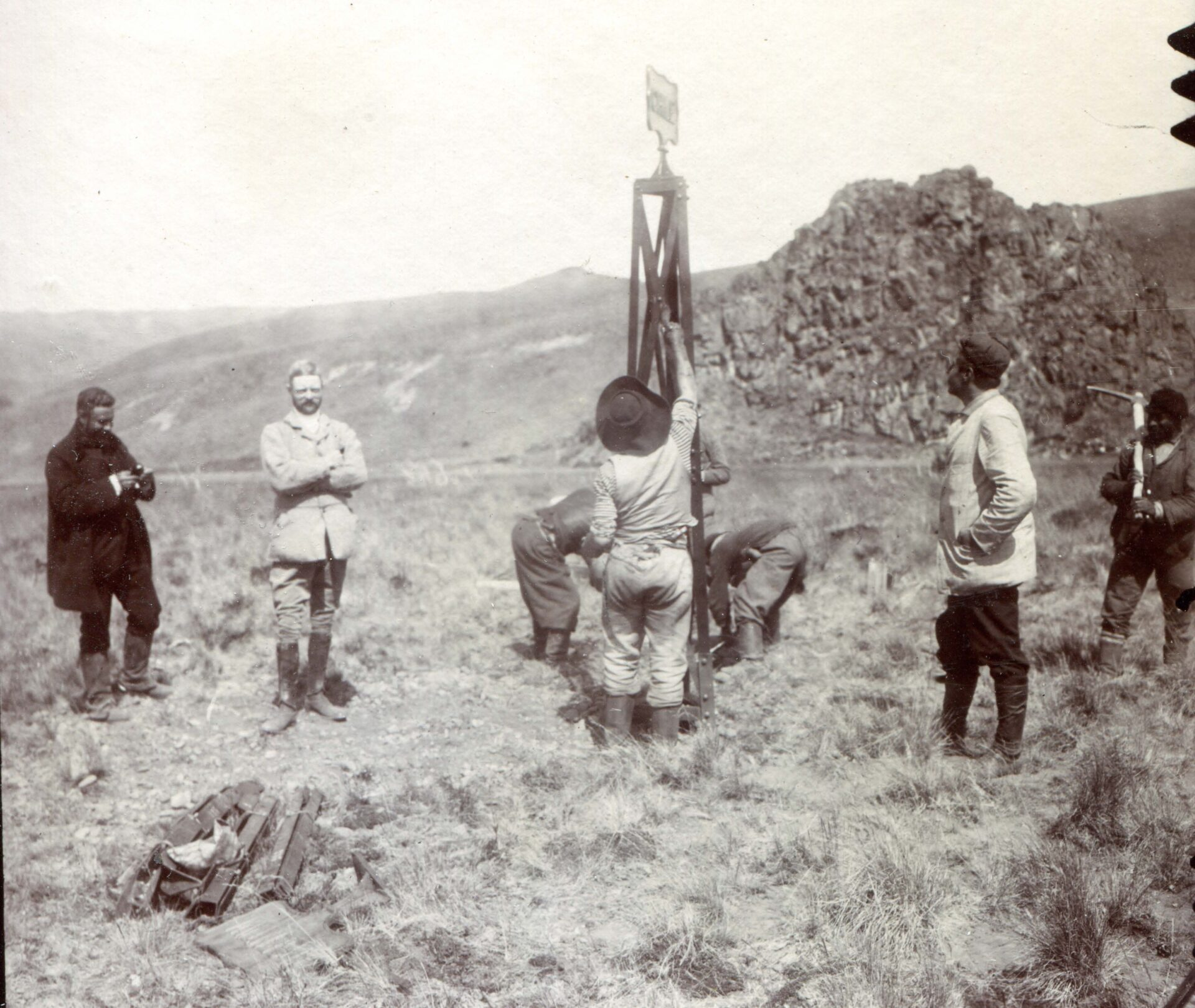
Placement of a boundary marker between Argentina and Chile; Enrique Eimar Soot appears looking at the camera.

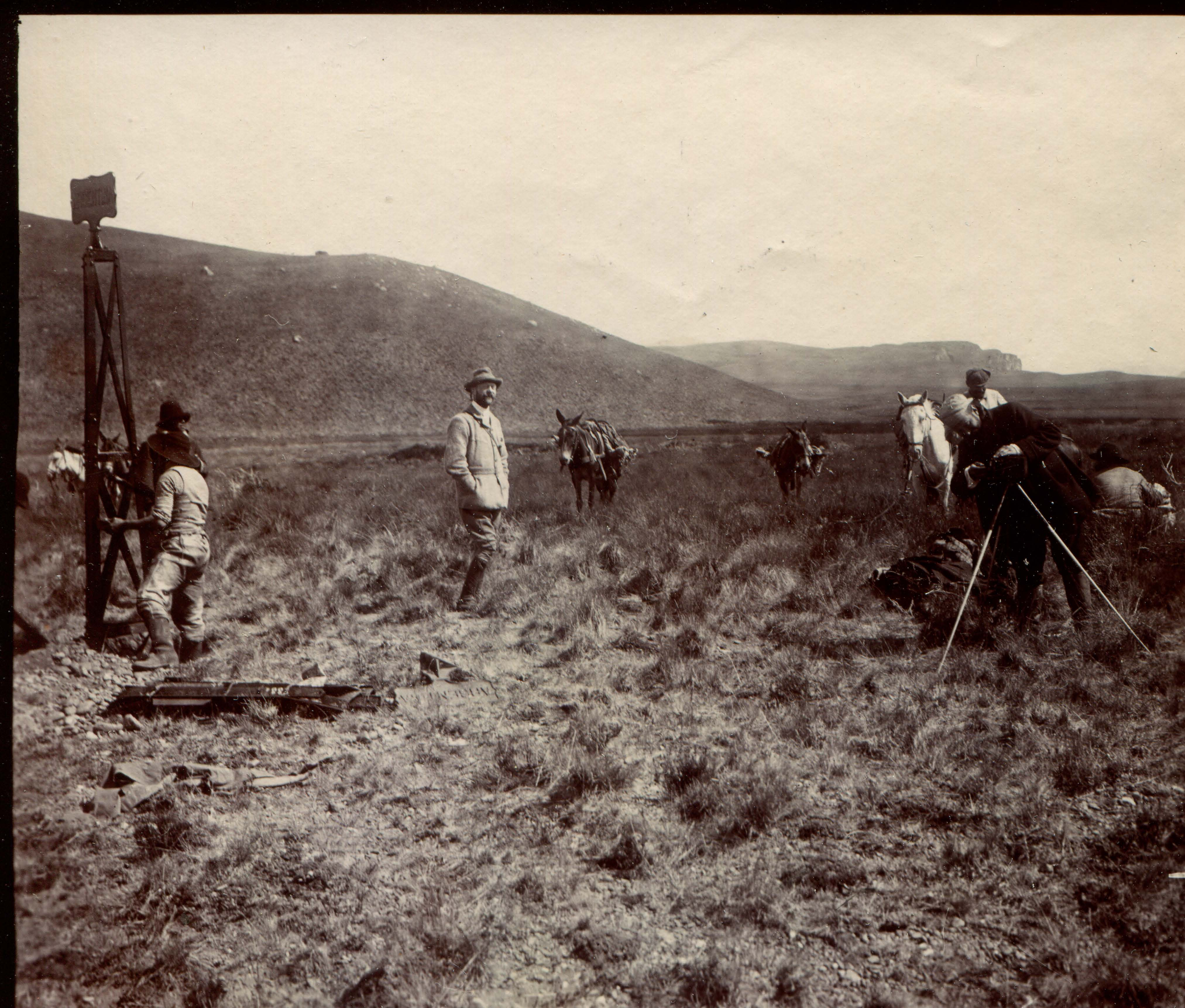
Installation of another boundary marker during the demarcation works.

After the 1902 Arbitral Award of the Andes, Soot took part as an Argentine assistant engineer in the practical demarcation of the frontier in northern and central Patagonia.

In March 1903, in the area of the Encuentro River—discovered by the German geographer Hans Steffen in the Alto Palena region—he met the British officer Bertram Dickson, who served as the demarcation commissioner appointed by the United Kingdom. During the first inspection they identified a small stream as the Encuentro River and erected a boundary pyramid there. However, after reviewing additional maps and observations, Dickson determined that the actual Encuentro River was a larger watercourse located several kilometres farther west.

Soot participated in the subsequent measurements and discussions together with Argentine engineer Emil Frey, with whom he had disagreements regarding the exact interpretation of the terrain. These works contributed to the final placement of boundary markers in sectors such as the Palena River, the Encuentro River and adjacent areas.

== Death ==
Soot died on 15 October 1909 at the age of 52.

== See also ==
- 1902 Arbitral award of the Andes between Argentina and Chile
- Francisco Pascasio Moreno
- Bertram Dickson
- Hans Steffen
