= Hanna–Honeycomb House =

Historic house in California, United States

- U.S. National Register of Historic Places
- U.S. National Historic Landmark
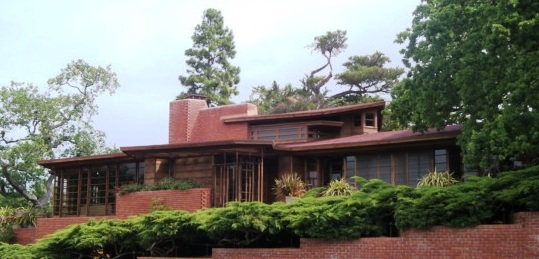

- Location within San Francisco Bay Area Location within California Location within the United States
- Interactive map showing the Hanna–Honeycomb House
- Nearest city: Stanford, California, United States
- Coordinates: 37°24′58″N 122°9′49″W
- Built: 1937
- Architect: Frank Lloyd Wright
- NRHP reference No.: 78000780

Significant dates
- Added to NRHP: November 7, 1978
- Designated NHL: June 29, 1989

The Hanna–Honeycomb House (also known as the Paul R. Hanna House; shortened to Hanna House) is a residence at 737 Frenchmans Road on the Stanford University campus in Stanford, California, United States. Designed by Frank Lloyd Wright in the Usonian style, it was his first work in the San Francisco Bay Area. The house is built atop a hill and consists of two interconnected wings, which include a main building, guest wing, hobby shop, storage building, double carport, breezeway, and garden house. Its floor plan, built around a hexagonal grid, was the first non-rectangular plan Wright ever designed. The house has received mixed commentary over the years and is designated as a National Historic Landmark.

The house was built for Stanford professor Paul Robert Hanna and his wife Jean Shuman Hanna. Wright formally received the commission in 1935, after Paul joined Stanford's faculty, though the Hannas had been thinking of hiring him for several years. After the Hannas acquired a site in 1936, the house was built the next year, and the Hannas moved in during November 1937. The house underwent multiple expansions and modifications through the early 1960s. The Hannas gave the property to Stanford University in 1975, and the house was used for events. The home was severely damaged by the 1989 Loma Prieta earthquake and reopened as a conference center in 1999.

The Hanna House shares materials and general arrangement with Wright's Usonian residences, although it is significantly larger than other Usonian houses. The house rises one story and is surrounded by terraces. The facade is made of boards and battens, along with brick, concrete, and glass; the center of the roof is raised to create a clerestory. The main house covers 3,640 square feet (338 m^{2}), and the workshop covers another 1,298 square feet (120.6 m^{2}). The interiors have an open plan configuration, allowing for easy reconfiguration, and have furnishings designed by Wright to fit the hexagonal grid. In general, the house is arranged around a central kitchen, with a playroom and bedroom wing extending southwest, and the guest wing extending northeast.

== Site ==
The Hanna-Honeycomb House is located at 737 Frenchmans Road (Note: Sometimes spelled Frenchman's Road. When the house was built, the road was known as Coronado Drive, so the house had the address 737 Coronado Drive.) in Stanford, California, United States. It is part of an 1 1/2-acre (0.61 ha) site, on the east side of Frenchmans Road and is bounded by other houses on three sides. It sits on the slope of a hill; the house's architect Frank Lloyd Wright had expressed the opinion that "No house should ever be on a hill or on anything. It should be of the hill. Belonging to it." The grounds include an interconnected main building, guest wing, hobby shop, storage building, double carport, breezeway, and garden house. These structures are arranged roughly in the shape of a perfect hexagon, a motif used throughout the house. The Hanna-Honeycomb House is one of several historic houses on the campus of Stanford University, along with the Lou Henry Hoover House at 623 Mirada Road and the MacFarland House at 775 Santa Ynez Street, both of which are also on the National Register of Historic Places.

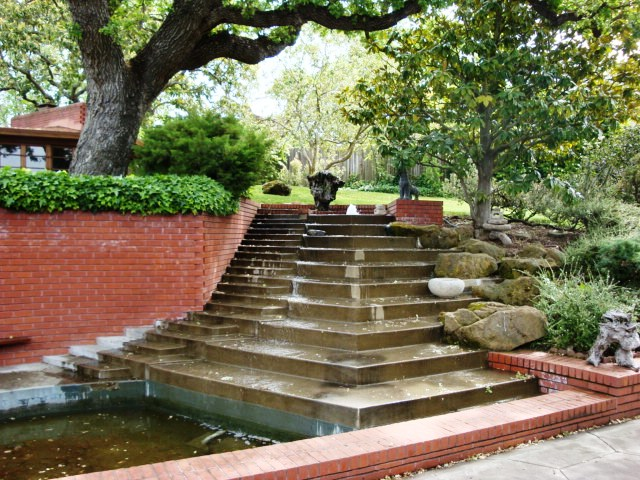
Fountain in front of the house

The grounds are landscaped in the manner of a Japanese garden. When the house was built, steep slopes were created via cutting and filling, held back by reinforcing walls. During the house's initial construction, the original owners (the Hanna family) had planned to eventually demolish part of the original garden, replacing one of the original brick paths with an extension of the house's terrace. The grounds have 50 fruit trees, around which the house was built. All but one of the eight preexisting trees were retained, including the site's only cypress tree, which was incorporated into the roof of the house. Sandstone underlies most of the lot, although the western section is made of clay. A minor branch of the San Andreas Fault runs directly under the site. The geologist Bailey Willis, a onetime neighbor of the Hanna family, said that although the fault under the house was not itself capable of creating tremors, it could amplify tremors from the main fault.

Hardscape features include concrete terraces adjoining each room, which protrude beyond the house's walls on all sides. The terraces are split across two levels, which are variously recessed or protruded from the hillside. All the terraces are connected, except for one gap near the living room at the western corner. Movable metal chairs and plywood-topped tables could be laid out whenever the Hannas hosted large parties. There were also chess tables with tiled surfaces, which could be screwed onto removable poles that could themselves be screwed into holes on the terraces. The grounds also have a staircase-like fountain, which connects two pools at separate levels. This fountain was an allusion to Wright's Fallingwater house, which the Hanna family had admired. There is also a two-toned urn salvaged from the second Imperial Hotel, Tokyo, which had been designed by Wright and was later demolished. The parking space next to the carport could fit 10 cars, while the slopes could accommodate another 25 cars for parties.

== History ==
=== Development ===
==== Background ====
The Hanna-Honeycomb House was the first building that Frank Lloyd Wright designed in the San Francisco Bay Area. Wright mostly designed houses for wealthy clients until the 1930s, when he began to design lower-cost Usonian houses for middle-class families. In general, his Usonian houses tended to have open plans, geometric floor grids, in-floor heating, and a carport, without a garage or basement. He began experimenting with the Usonian style in the late 1920s, tweaking the style even as the Herbert and Katherine Jacobs First House in Madison, Wisconsin—sometimes cited as Wright's first-ever Usonian house—was being constructed.

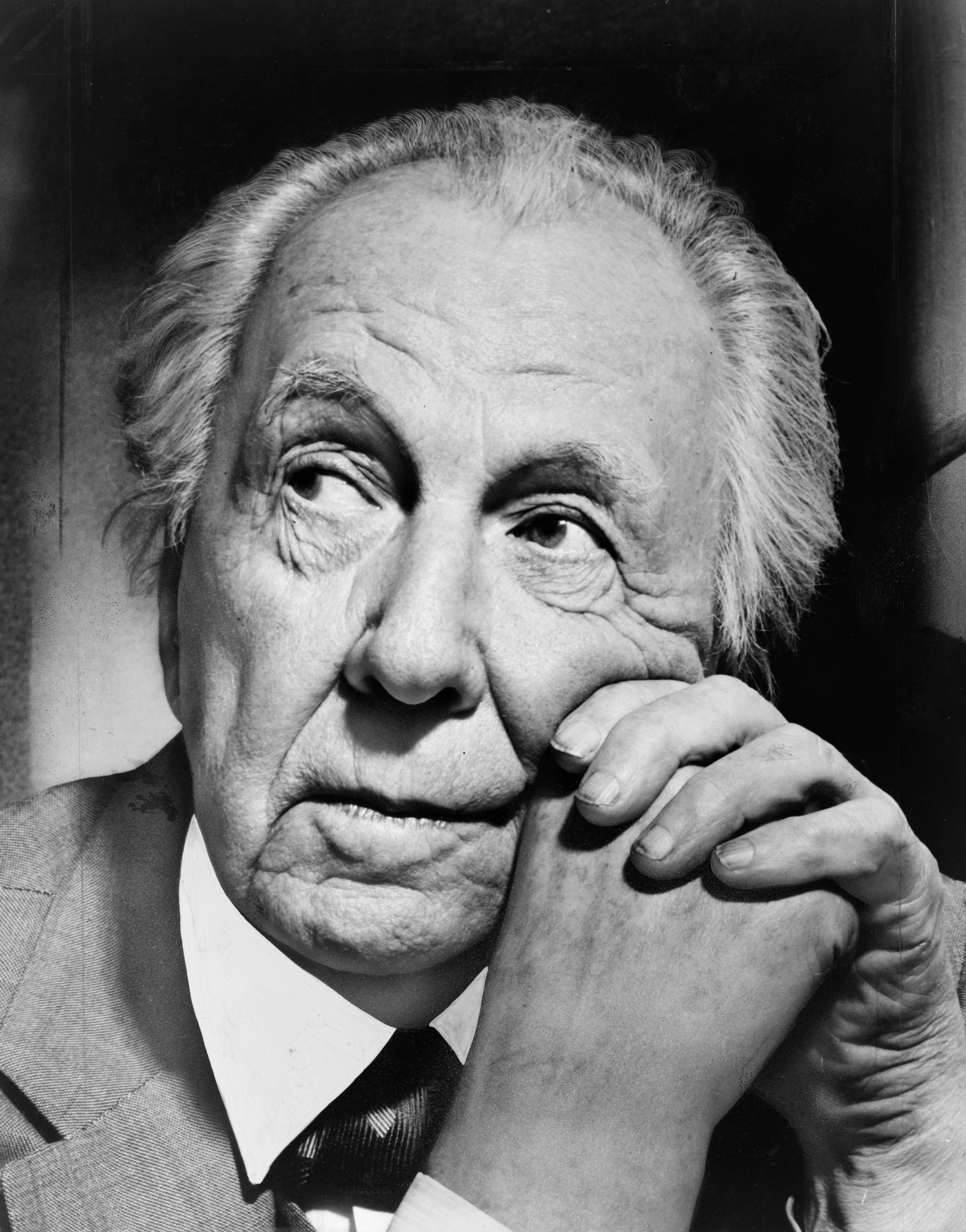
In 1931, the Hannas visited Frank Lloyd Wright (pictured), asking him to design their house.

The house's first occupants were Stanford University professor Paul Robert Hanna (1902–1988), and his wife, Jean Shuman Hanna (1902–1987). Paul and Jean were educators long associated with Stanford, and both were children of itinerant ministers. Neither of their families had been able to remodel their respective clergy houses, as both families frequently moved from town to town. After meeting each other as college students, Paul and Jean began to yearn for their own house, keeping notes of architectural ideas. The Hannas wished to avoid the then-prevalent International Style, which was too austere for their tastes, but also wanted a high-quality design. They first learned about Wright after learning about one of his architectural lectures in 1930. After he responded to a piece of fan mail inviting the Hannas to his Wisconsin studio, they went to visit him in 1931. The Hannas unsuccessfully attempted to convince Paul's employer, Columbia University, to let them and several colleagues develop a modern-styled residential enclave in the Bronx, New York. The Hannas' plans for a new house were delayed by several years, during which the couple had three children.

==== Wright commission and site selection ====
After Paul joined Stanford's faculty in 1935, the couple again reached out to Wright, writing to him with a wish list of features. For example, they wanted a building nestled on a hilltop, with a myriad of terraces, glass walls, and a flexible layout, which would accommodate both the Hannas and their children. The house also had to be able to fit 30 dinner guests or 100 partygoers. Wright sent the Hannas a sketch of a two-story house in late 1935, but the Hannas insisted that the architect design a one-story structure. At the time, Jean had recently fallen down a staircase and was still recuperating. The Hannas later said that they were perplexed why Wright sent them a two-story drawing, as they had never indicated that they wanted a multi-story house.

The Hannas tried to obtain a site from Stanford. This process was delayed because the university was deciding whether to develop a water-supply reservoir, which affected where on the campus the house would be built. The family identified three possible sites on the slopes of hills, and in March 1936, Wright visited Palo Alto, California, to look at the sites. Although both Wright and the Hannas preferred a hilly lot, Wright drew up plans for a flat site, in case a hillside site was not available. That April, Wright drew up plans for a house with hexagonal modules intersecting at 120-degree angles, writing to the Hannas that the rooms would "be more quiet than rectangular ones" and that the plans would allow a high amount of flexibility. The plans called for a building with a small cellar, a redwood-and-glass facade, and a simple interior. The hexagonal modules came as a surprise to the Hannas, who had heard Wright discuss the hexagonal plans on previous trips but had not taken him seriously. The Hannas eventually acquired a site close to the Stanford campus, and they wrote to Wright in July 1936, telling him that Stanford had permitted them to select a hillside site.

The Hannas had budgeted $15,000 for the house (including the architect's fee), (Note: Equivalent to $273,000 in 2025) but before the site had been finalized, the cost increased to $19,800: a base fee of $18,000, plus Wright's 10% commission. (Note: Equivalent to $361,000 in 2025. The base fee is equivalent to $328,000, while Wright's fee is equivalent to $33,000.) When the Hannas wrote to Wright asking why, the architect said that "I appreciate your dilemma. Everything gets down to a money matter so quickly [...] It will come out right in the end." To resolve the cost concerns, the Hannas proposed a flexible layout, initially with smaller bedrooms for each child; after the children moved out, these rooms would be combined to create larger spaces. The plans went through several iterations and were severely delayed. This bothered the Hannas, who had expected to move into the new house in April 1937. The family received a two-month extension on their existing lease, which could not be extended further because the landlord had other tenants. The Hanna family also learned from a neighbor, the geologist Bailey Willis, that a branch of the San Andreas Fault ran underneath. Willis wrote to the Hannas that September, advising them about the fault and the geological conditions, and recommending that the Hannas build a lightweight home with a concrete foundation. The Hannas passed along Willis's warning to Wright. Wright—whose Imperial Hotel had survived the 1923 Great Kantō earthquake—dismissed the earthquake concerns and proceeded with the original plans; he left the soil uncompacted because he thought his design would resist tremors.

==== Construction ====
The Hannas attempted to solicit bids from multiple contractors, who were reluctant to be involved with such an unconventional hexagonal design. Harold Turner ultimately was selected as the construction contractor, having been recommended to the Hannas by Stanford professor Daniel Mendelowitz. After Turner visited Wright's staff at Taliesin, Wright allowed the Hannas to hire him as the contractor. The family agreed to pay Turner a maximum of $1,500, (Note: Equivalent to $26,000 in 2025) on the assumption that he would work for five months. Work began in January 1937, upon which the Hannas leased the land from Stanford comptroller Almon Roth. Although the house was budgeted at $25,000 by then, (Note: Equivalent to $439,000 in 2025) Turner told the Hannas that the house would be worth twice that, to their confusion. (Note: Equivalent to $879,000 in 2025) When construction began, the Hannas objected that Wright's plans still envisaged narrow doorways, beds, and tubs; Wright responded that the seemingly small dimensions were based on decades of architectural experience. After several weeks, the Hannas acceded to Wright's specifications.

The Hanna House was built concurrently with several of Wright's other designs, including the Jacobs First House, the Johnson Administration Building, and Fallingwater. Turner hired unemployed local carpenters to work on the house one week at a time, who built the house almost entirely by hand. Two layers of concrete flooring were poured. The floor was then divided into hexagonal modules with precise dimensions, since even small errors could create significant misalignments throughout the house when compounded. The concrete took so long to cure that some of the above-ground brickwork was completed when the concrete had dried out. Afterward, hexagonal piers and the roof were constructed, followed by the exterior and interior walls, the utilities, and finally the windows.

Issues with the project arose nearly every week, many of which had to be corrected, adding to the Hannas' already high costs. Many of the issues were attributed to the project's complexity, the novelty of the non-rectilinear plan, Wright's infrequent site visits and delayed responses, and Turner's tendency to swap out materials without notifying Wright. Some of the mistakes could not be fixed, such as the roof, where rafters were built vertically rather than horizontally as Wright had envisioned. After the original brick contractor went on vacation during construction, the Hannas hired a new contractor who destroyed and rebuilt the existing brickwork. Other errors had arisen because of the Hannas' lack of construction experience. Nonetheless, the Hannas wrote that "there were far more success than failures" during the construction, citing the high quality of the work.

=== Hanna use ===
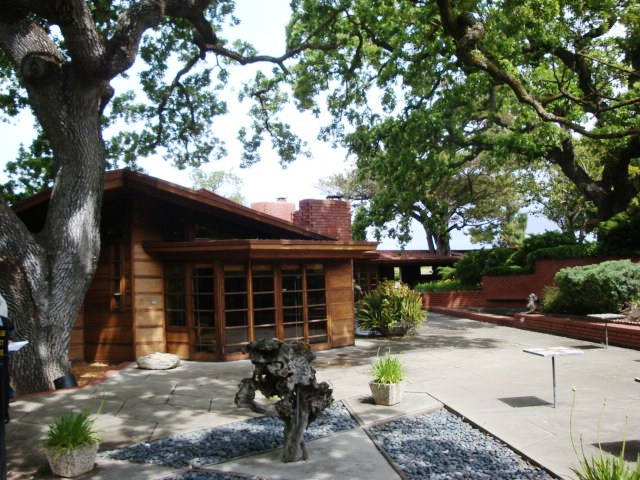
The facade as seen from a courtyard

The Hannas moved into the house in November 1937. They brought along books, clothes, toys, kitchen supplies, and other small objects. The Hannas gave away their old furniture, but the new house's furnishings were not yet completed, so they lived without furniture for several weeks. They first invited Wright to the house early the next year. The original cost estimate had increased significantly to over $37,000. (Note: Equivalent to $650,000 in 2025) The Hannas resented the cost increases and threatened to withhold payments to Wright, though the family later wrote that they were just grateful that Wright's 10% commission was lower than those of other architects.

The house immediately attracted notice, and the Hannas recalled having to turn away unsolicited visitors. John Hanna, one of the Hannas' sons, retrospectively said that when he was growing up, passersby sometimes took pictures of the house unsolicited. Stanford president Ray Lyman Wilbur joked that he would seize the house for use as a faculty club. Although Wilbur's suggestion was made in levity, the Hannas seriously considered repurposing the house after they moved out. In the meantime, the Hannas invited visitors, architects, and Stanford students over, and their children often brought curious friends. Wright himself often visited, sometimes throwing around pillows that Jean would move around after Wright's visit had ended. Although the Hanna-Honeycomb House could accommodate parties with up to 150 guests, they preferred more informal events, particularly those that required few or no servants. The events they hosted included cocktail parties, dessert-musicales, Sunday breakfasts, or student brunches.

==== Expansions ====
The house underwent various modifications in the 25 years after the first sections were completed. By 1946, the Hannas were expanding their house to include children's bedrooms. The Hannas also planned a guest house with a workshop; they revised their plans to also include storage, a kitchenette and bath, a laundry room, and a painting room. The workshop, storage room, and guest residence were completed in 1950. The Hannas themselves used the shop to build furniture, equipment, toys, and utensils, along with leisure items such as kites and surfboards. The family's neighbors and students also used the shop to construct items, and Wright himself built some of the house's furniture in the hobby shop. A driveway with a retaining wall was added in 1952.

After the Hanna children moved out, the parents wished to change the layout; the modular floor plan and flexible partitions made it easy to rearrange the interior spaces. After the children had moved away, Wright rearranged the study and four bedrooms in 1957. He created a guest suite for the Hannas' grandchildren, and he rearranged the walls to convert the remaining space into a master bedroom and a library. The relocation of the master suite, which occupied the former playroom, required more extensive renovation. Two fireplaces were added. When the renovation was completed in 1958, Wright came to the house and said that "it has all come together"; it would be his last visit.

In 1961, the Hannas added a garden house south of the existing house, along with a fountain and two pools. This comprised the last major modification to the house. The house continued to host tours through the 1970s, and the Hannas received visitors from across the world, including from Canada, Cambodia, the Congo, Egypt, and several Western European and East Asian countries. Jean Hanna said at the time that "we put our backs, brains, and our life blood into this house". John Hanna said the quality of the house's design had led him and his siblings to seek "that degree of perfection in our homes, furnishings, and landscaping".

=== Stanford University use ===
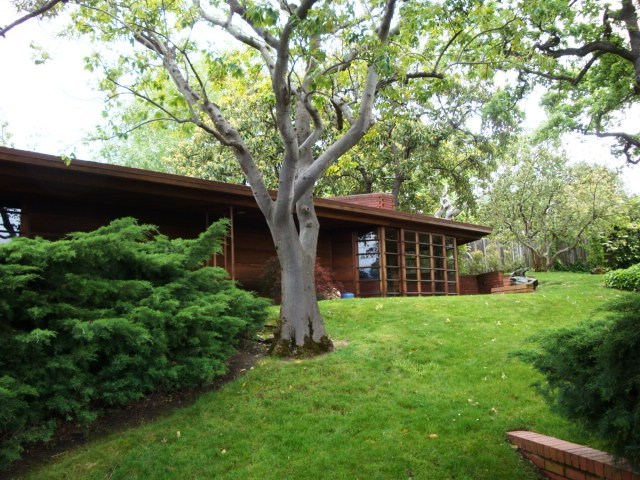
The Hannas gave the property to Stanford University in 1975.

After living in the house for 38 years, the Hannas gave the property to Stanford University in 1975, under the condition that the house accommodate visiting professors. Instead, it housed four university provosts. Although the Hanna-Honeycomb House had an estimated valuation of $300,000, Stanford provost James Rosse said the house's value was that of "an exquisite piece of art" and was not measurable. The California Historic Preservation Conference gave the house a merit award in 1983 after it underwent some restoration. The provost's office frequently hosted events at the Hanna-Honeycomb House. Among the events were a 1984 party attended by Swedish king Carl XVI Gustaf and ten Nobel Prize winners affiliated with Stanford, as well as a December 1988 party to celebrate the building's 50th anniversary. The Committee for Art gave two tours a month, and the Stanford Art Museum directed its docent trainees visit the house as part of their training.

The home was severely damaged by the 1989 Loma Prieta earthquake, in part due to the lack of strong reinforcement. Bricks fell off, the floor slab sank, and the roof nearly slipped off the walls. Although the adjacent section of the San Andreas Fault was inactive during the quake, the foundation and chimney likely would have collapsed if the earthquake had lasted longer. The Hanna House Board of Governors was formed in 1993 to raise $2 million for a renovation. (Note: Equivalent to $4.0 million in 2025) The university had raised $1 million by 1996, allowing renovations to begin; (Note: Equivalent to $1.9 million in 2025) this included a $600,000 grant from the Federal Emergency Management Agency (FEMA) and $400,000 raised by Stanford. (Note: The FEMA grant is equivalent to $1.1, while the amount Stanford raised is equivalent to $0.8 million in 2025.) Renovations included adding rebar to the chimneys, rebuilding the floor slab so it could be structurally reinforced, stiffening the roofs with plywood, and adding tubes for structural support. To avoid interfering with the existing design, the new supports were added in existing crevices. Keith Alward of Berkeley, California, was hired to restore the woodwork.

The house reopened in April 1999 as a conference center; the project cost $1.2 million in total. (Note: Equivalent to $2.2 million in 2025) At the time, Stanford was one of several California universities that had renovated architecturally distinctive homes at significant expense; the University of Southern California was also renovating Wright's Samuel Freeman House in Los Angeles, while the University of California, Berkeley, was renovating the Weston Havens House. Stanford decided not to use the house as a residence and instead considered hosting tours, receptions, or dinners. In the 21st century, the house is open for limited tours. It is occasionally used for university functions such as seminars and receptions.

== Architecture ==
The Paul R. Hanna House is a Usonian-style residence designed by Wright. Although it is significantly larger than other Usonian houses, it shares many similarities in materials and general arrangement. The writer Robert McCarter wrote that the house's juxtaposition of materials gave the house a Japanese quality. Wright did not use any paint in the house's design.

Both the exterior and interior are designed based on a series of 13-inch-long (330 mm) units; all dimensions in the house are multiples of these units. The floor plan is laid out on a grid of 30- and 60-degree angles, with hexagonal modules meeting at 120-degree angles. Due to the hexagonal modules used in the floor plan, the house is sometimes called the Honeycomb House or the Hanna–Honeycomb House. The house had the first non-rectangular floor plan Wright had ever designed. Wright himself proclaimed the building "the first house in the world built on the 'honey comb' or hexagonal principle". There are no right angles in the floor plan, and right angles are used only where walls and floors intersect. This contrasted with other houses, which tended to be built on rectangular grids; Wright wrote that right angles were inferior to obtuse angles when it came to "to and fro".

=== Exterior ===
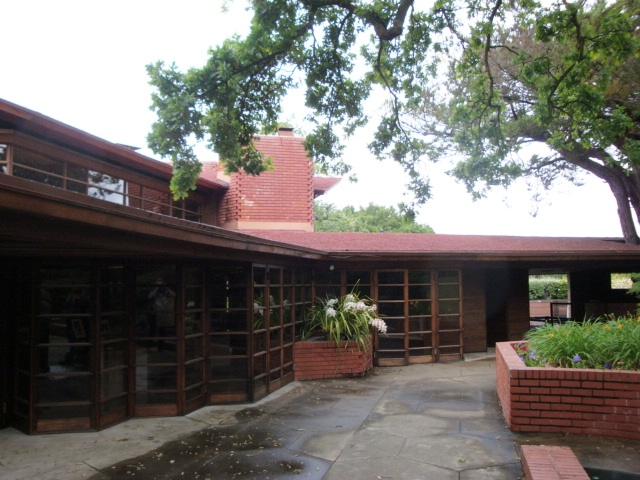
The eastern wall of the house, between the southeast (left) and northeast (right) arms

The house is one story high. The facade is constructed of locally-sourced redwood boards interspersed with recessed battens, which are arranged horizontally into layers measuring 13 inches (330 mm) or one unit tall. The design of the boards and battens was intended to give the impression of thinness. Each unit consists of a 2-inch (51 mm) batten and 11-inch (280 mm) board about 2 3/4 inches (70 mm) thick, with aluminum foil insulation behind. They are mounted onto studs measuring 1 by 8 inches (25 mm × 203 mm) across and spaced about 22 inches (560 mm) or 26 inches (660 mm) apart. The battens are screwed, rather than nailed, onto the studs; as a result, none of the battens splintered during the house's early years. At the house's corners, the walls intersect to create stiff supports for the roof. Additional supports are located on the north and west walls, while the other walls largely lack structural support.

The facade also incorporates San Jose brick, concrete, and plate glass. During the summer, glass doors abutting the terraces could be opened, making the terraces into extensions of the interior living spaces. There are full-height windows with horizontal mullions spaced 13 inches (330 mm) apart overlapping vertical piers between each window. The piers are hexagonal and are topped by heavy steel flitch plates. There are also sliding insect screens, similar to Japanese shoji panels.

The roof was originally made of copper, with rafters laid vertically (though Wright had originally wanted the rafters to run horizontally, parallel to the facade). It has since been resurfaced with a material called Heydite. The roof has a protruding central section with clerestory openings above the main roof. The clerestory ventilates the interior spaces, since hot air from inside rises toward the clerestory; it allows breezes to flow through during the summer, cooling down the interiors below. Because of the raised central section, the undersides (or soffits) of the roof are also split across multiple levels. There are trellis openings in the soffits where the walls terminate or angle inward. To avoid interrupting the open plan interior, the roof rests primarily on the exterior walls, creating long ceiling sections unsupported by anything. The walls and roof were also poorly secured, leaving the house vulnerable to seismic damage.

The layout is similar to Wright's L-shaped Usonian houses, albeit with a different room layout because of its relatively secluded site. For instance, the kitchen is placed at the center of the building. The main wing extends southeast of the kitchen, with the living spaces and bedrooms, and a secondary wing extends northeast, with a carport and a guest suite. At the house's northwest corner is a forecourt, which leads to the carport just outside the main entrance. There is a red tile on a column supporting the carport, where Wright signed his name; this made the Hanna-Honeycomb House one of 19 buildings where Wright signed his name on a tile. The main entrance itself, in the secondary wing, is located under a loggia with a low soffit. The loggia's low soffit contrasts with the higher ceilings inside, creating what House Beautiful magazine called a "sense of lift".

=== Interior ===
The main house covers 3,640 square feet (338 m^{2}), and the workshop covers another 1,298 square feet (120.6 m^{2}). The interior uses the same materials as the exterior. House Beautiful wrote that the use of consistent materials created a theme in which "every element is a part of some larger whole", but the consistent design also made it difficult to conceal structural reinforcements. When built, the main house had a largely open plan configuration. The open plan is divided into a living–dining room, playroom, kitchen, foyer, music room, and study, and originally included four bedrooms and three bathrooms. The open-plan arrangement permitted lengthy outward-facing sightlines throughout the house. The house's floor slab comprises two layers of concrete, each measuring 3 inches (7.6 cm) thick and separated by rebar. The floor grid consists of hexagons measuring 26 inches (660 mm), or two units, on each side. The hexagons are delineated by zinc strips pressed into the concrete, to which the wall panels are fastened. There are also hexagonal closets throughout the house, which conceal the presence of columns.

The wall could be readily disassembled and reassembled, and they have electric conduits embedded into them. One writer said the original wall placements created "spaces that slowly revealed themselves". The original doors in the house were narrow, which originally bothered the Hannas until Wright told them that the doors were temporary. When the house was renovated in the 1950s, the original narrow doors were replaced with those measuring four units, or 52 inches (1,300 mm), wide. The interiors have ceilings of varying heights, measuring between 6 1/2 and 16 1/3 feet (2.0 and 5.0 m) high. The ceilings, combined with the clerestory windows and exterior terraces, were intended as articulation or stylization. The soffits have indirect lighting fixtures, and the clerestories, skylights, and outdoor trellises restricted the house's natural-light exposure, creating patterns of shadows. Although Jean Hanna liked that the interior illumination was "immensely flattering to women", Wright had not designed the house with lighting levels under consideration.

In the basement is a mechanical vault with water heater, water-softener equipment, and gas furnaces. There is a service tunnel under the house, with a cross section of 48 by 48 inches (1,200 by 1,200 mm), which was excavated out of the underlying adobe. The tunnel is made of concrete and is covered by a layer of gravel, above which is the concrete floor slab. This tunnel was intended to carry all utilities, including hot and cold water intake pipes, a sewage pipe, electrical wires, and air intake and exhaust ducts, and the concrete accordingly had to be poured to precise specifications. Over 400 electrical sockets were placed throughout the house. Because the Hannas were skeptical of Wright's proposal for in-floor heating, they hired a local company to build them a forced-air gas system, split into three zones.

==== Interior spaces ====
The kitchen is located at the center of the house, just beneath the clerestory. The kitchen ceilings are taller than any other in the house. The clerestory windows, in addition to serving a ventilation purpose. let sunlight into the kitchen. The rest of the walls, under the clerestories, are occupied mostly by storage shelves. Counters lead on to the living and dining rooms; the openings to the living and dining rooms can be closed off with redwood shutters if necessary. Two fireplaces surrounding the kitchen carry the roof's weight. The living room is west of the kitchen, with views in four directions, and according to the Hannas could accommodate over 100 people easily. As originally configured, the living room had a dining nook with space for eight to ten seats.

Originally, the southeast wing contained a playroom to the west and bedrooms and a study to the east. Both the bedrooms and the playroom (later dining room) were two units above the kitchen and living room level. The original playroom had a puppetry stage, along with a model train set, easels, books, and music records. It was easily adaptable for parties, dances, and Cub Scout meetings. The children's bedrooms were relatively small, leading Wright to describe them as stalls. The study had enough space for two desks and a couch. The 20-inch-wide (51 cm) hallway, of which they were initially skeptical, did not pose any significant impediment and even became a topic of conversation.

The 1957 renovation reconfigured the bedroom spaces into a single master bedroom, a library, and a grandchildren's guest bedroom. After this reconfiguration, the Hannas used the eastern rooms (the library and study) during the morning and early afternoon, and they moved to the western rooms (the living and dining rooms) during the late afternoon. The relocated master bedroom has a fireplace that was not part of the original design. The master bedroom has a glass wall adjoining the terraces, along with a sloped ceiling topped by clerestory windows. There are also wardrobes, walk-in closets, and a bathroom adjoining the master bedroom. The library—replacing the original study and master bedroom—has desks, cabinets, bookshelves, and a glass terrace wall. A service hall separates the library and master bedroom. The guest bedroom, between the service hall and master bedroom, adjoins the terraces and could be used as a TV room. The dining room was also split out into its own space, occupying the playroom's former space in the southeast wing. The relocated dining room has a 2-person table that could be expanded to fit 36 diners, in addition to a glass terrace wall.

==== Furnishings ====
The furnishings, designed in part by Wright, were also built to fit the hexagonal grid. For example, the chairs had hexagonal seats, along with seatbacks and legs containing cutouts. The beds were built with hexagonal ends, and even the bedsheets were folded into hexagonal patterns. Wright initially placed bamboo shades in the bedrooms on the house's eastern flank, but by the 1960s, only the west-facing rooms had any shades. The Hannas displayed keepsakes from their trips around the world, such as bronzes, furniture, dishes, bedspreads, carpets, conventional furniture, and a grandfather clock. Later on, the hexagonal beds were replaced with conventional rectangular beds.

== Impact and legacy ==
=== Reception ===
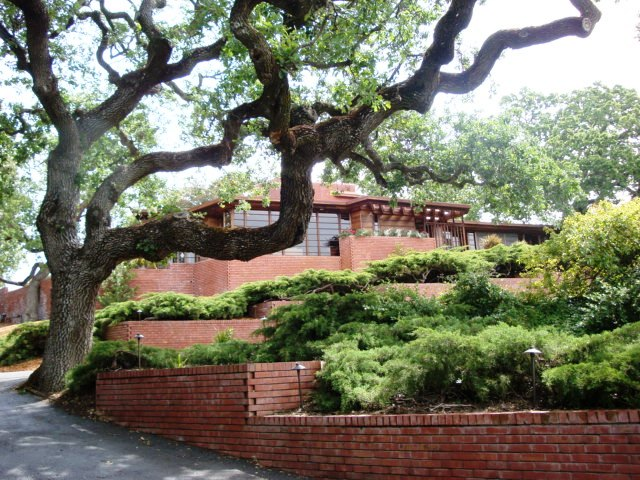
The house initially received negative commentary.

When the house was under construction, Stanford's student newspaper The Stanford Daily called the Hanna House "Stanford's most romantic home situated on Stanford's most romantic spot". The house initially received negative commentary. Local residents worried that potential real-estate investors would be deterred by the house's unusual design, and Ray Lyman Wilbur recalled two senior faculty members asking him to fire Hanna because "only a madman would consider putting up such an outrageous structure". One guest wrote that they felt an emotional familiarity with the house, saying that it did not have "the kind of airiness with open, glass walls" but rather a feeling of spaciousness, owing to the half-height partitions. Curtis Besinger of House Beautiful magazine wrote in 1963 that "when you enter the house, you soon realize that you are in a space that is stimulating to the imagination, endlessly fascinating, and not like any that you have been in before". Besinger said the house's hilltop site gave it the feeling of openness.

In 1976, the writer Charles Willard Moore said that "everything is thrown out that does not fit the organic geometry of the hexagon" and that the house had not been replicated as a result. One writer said in 2010 that, despite the unorthodox design, the house was "a delightful abode". In American National Bibliography, the writer Frederick Ivor-Campbell wrote that the house's design showed "how Wright's system of Polygonal modules could provide the openness that he associated with freedom of movement while gracefully integrating the house with its sloping topography". Meryle Secrest, one of Wright's biographers, said the hexagonal motif gave him more freedom to experiment with "shifts of direction and emphasis", which he continued to do in future houses. A guide on Stanford University's buildings wrote: "From within, the house seems to extend physically and visually in every direction..."

The house was frequently featured in media. For instance, it was the subject of an entire issue of House Beautiful magazine in January 1963, and it was depicted in the centerpiece of a Japanese book about Wright's work. Over nearly a half-century, the Hannas kept extensive notes regarding the house's architecture, development, and usage; the notes were published in the book Frank Lloyd Wright's Hanna House in 1981. One writer for Architecture: The AIA Journal wrote in 1981 that "Frank Lloyd Wright had no more devoted clients than Paul and Jean Hanna". After moving out, the Hannas donated their notes, along with other documents and communications relating to the house's construction, to Stanford University.

=== Design influence and landmark status ===
One Wright biographer, William Allin Storrer, said the hexagon surpassed the octagon as Wright's favorite motif to experiment with. Wright's later work incorporated triangles and parallelograms—both formed on 60- and 120-degree angles, as a regular hexagon was—in addition to non-linear shapes such as spirals. The house inspired the design of the William Emory House in Lafayette, Indiana, whose owner commissioned a hexagonal design from Donald Wolters after seeing the Hanna-Honeycomb House. The Dr. Charles H. Kennedy House in Arkansas, designed by Warren Segraves, also incorporates elements from the Hanna House, including a hexagonal grid and detailed eaves. Other decorative details, such as the glass, terraces, redwood and brick material, and overhanging roof, were commonplace mid-20th-century architectural features.

After Wright's death, the American Institute of Architects (AIA) described the Hanna–Honeycomb House as one of seventeen "examples of [Wright's] contribution to American culture". The Hanna–Honeycomb House was added to the National Register of Historic Places in 1978. The house was also designated a National Historic Landmark (NHL) in 1989.

== See also ==
- List of Frank Lloyd Wright works
- List of National Historic Landmarks in California
- National Register of Historic Places listings in Santa Clara County, California
