= Herbert Leland Crosthwait =

British military engineer, colonel and surveyor

- Born: 1868; Bagenalstown, County Carlow, Ireland
- Died: 11 September 1940 (aged 71–72)
- Military career
- Allegiance: United Kingdom
- Branch: British Army
- Service years: 1890–1921
- Rank: Colonel
- Unit: Royal Engineers
- Awards: Companion of the Order of the Indian Empire (CIE)

Colonel Herbert Leland Crosthwait, CIE (1868 – 11 September 1940) was a British military engineer and surveyor known for his work with the Survey of India and contributions to international boundary demarcations between Chile and Argentina.

== Early life and education ==
Crosthwait was born in 1868, in The Lodge, Bagenalstown, County Carlow, Ireland. The eldest son of Samuel Crosthwait, a flour mill proprietor at The Lodge Mills, and his wife Sarah Eliza Perry. He had several siblings, including Lucy Eleanor (born 1869), Cecil Henry Edward (1870), Edward Gerard Stewart (1871), William Sylvester (1873), Evelyn Mary (1876), Eileen Elizabeth (1880), Leland George (1881), Arthur Samuel (1883), Ernest Jevon (1886), and Elsie Olive (1887). His family had deep roots in Ireland, with ancestors involved in mercantile activities in Dublin since the 18th century, including roles in the Bank of Ireland and Dublin Chamber of Commerce. He was educated at Rossall School (referred to as "Bossall" in the obituary) and at Trinity College Dublin.

== Career ==
He entered the Royal Engineers in 1890. Two years later he went to India and in 1897 joined the Survey of India, in which he remained for the rest of his service. He became well known for his very extended knowledge of a variety of scientific subjects; contemporaries noted that had he concentrated on any single subject he would easily have become an authority on it. His broad expertise made him a valued and engaging companion.

In 1902–1903, Crosthwait served as the chief demarcator for the British arbitration award settling the border dispute between Argentina and Chile. He was responsible for marking the terrain in the Última Esperanza region and produced a key map that influenced the boundary demarcation.

Disregarding the Chilean agent Bolados and the Argentine agent Arenberg, he placed boundary marker 62 south of Lake O'Higgins/San Martín using a pile of stones and a paper inside a bottle, as he was short on time.

A bottle was placed by me on pile of stones, erected as a boundary pillar between the Republics of Argentina and Chile on the south shore of lake San Martin

— H. L. Crosthwait, Captain R. E., February 28th 1903

He rose to the rank of lieutenant colonel and was appointed a Companion of the Order of the Indian Empire (CIE) in the 1921 Birthday Honours for his services in the Survey Department. He retired as a colonel.

== Personal life ==
His younger brother, Leland George Crosthwait, married Katherine Rosa Man on 3 November 1911 at St Luke's, Chelsea, London, connecting the Crosthwait family to the Man family.

Crosthwait died on 11 September 1940, aged 72.

== See also ==
- Thomas Holdich
- Bertram Dickson
