= Exequiel Bustillo =

Argentine lawyer and politician

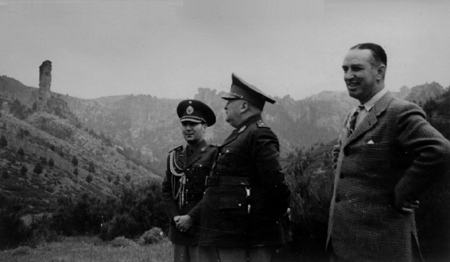
- Exequiel Bustillo (right) in Valle Encantado together with the commissary of Territorio del Neuquén (1939).

Deputy of Buenos Aires Province Chamber of Deputies
- In office 1924–1927

President of the Argentine National Park Service
- In office 1934–1944

Exequiel Bustillo (1893–1973) was an Argentine lawyer and politician. He was president of the Argentine National Park Service.

As director of the National Park Service he enjoyed great autonomy and set out to develop the national parks according to his vision. Several activities contrary to his vision were targeted. He over sighted the eviction of settlers living of husbandry many of whom were Chileans. Under his leadership logging activity was suppressed.

In the position he commissioned his brother Alejandro Bustillo among others to design build-up the city of Bariloche as a centre for tourism. In his development plans Bustillo was inspired in Hubert Lyautey's administration of French Morocco.

Especially through his autobiographical writing El despertar de Bariloche (first edition from 1968), which Bustillo had written on the basis of his private archive, and which is now in the Archivo General de la Nación, Exequiel Bustillo successfully made a name for himself as the actual creator of the national parks. Bustillo, who was deeply rooted in the aristocratic oligarchy of Buenos Aires, presented the earlier park initiatives of Francisco Pascasio Moreno, Carlos Thays and Bailey Willis - while concealing the works of Carl Curt Hosseus and Lucíen Hauman. With regard to the Nahuel Huapi National Park, Bustillo - consciously or unconsciously - ignores the work already done on site in the National Park of the South, which had existed since 1922. Bustillo certainly referred to the outstanding qualities of his collaborator Emilio Frey. But despite this eulogy on Frey, Bustillo conceals that Frey was not only an official of the Dirección de Tierras at that time, but in this function the official director of the National Park del Sud, established in 1922 and that in this capacity he had carried out various works to set up the park and improve its infrastructure. Recent works - regional historical works - have right-ly pointed out that the Bustillo myth of the park's foundation must be deconstructed and regionally-historically corrected.
