= 1902 Arbitral award of the Andes between Argentina and Chile =

International border arbitration

The Cordillera of the Andes Boundary Case
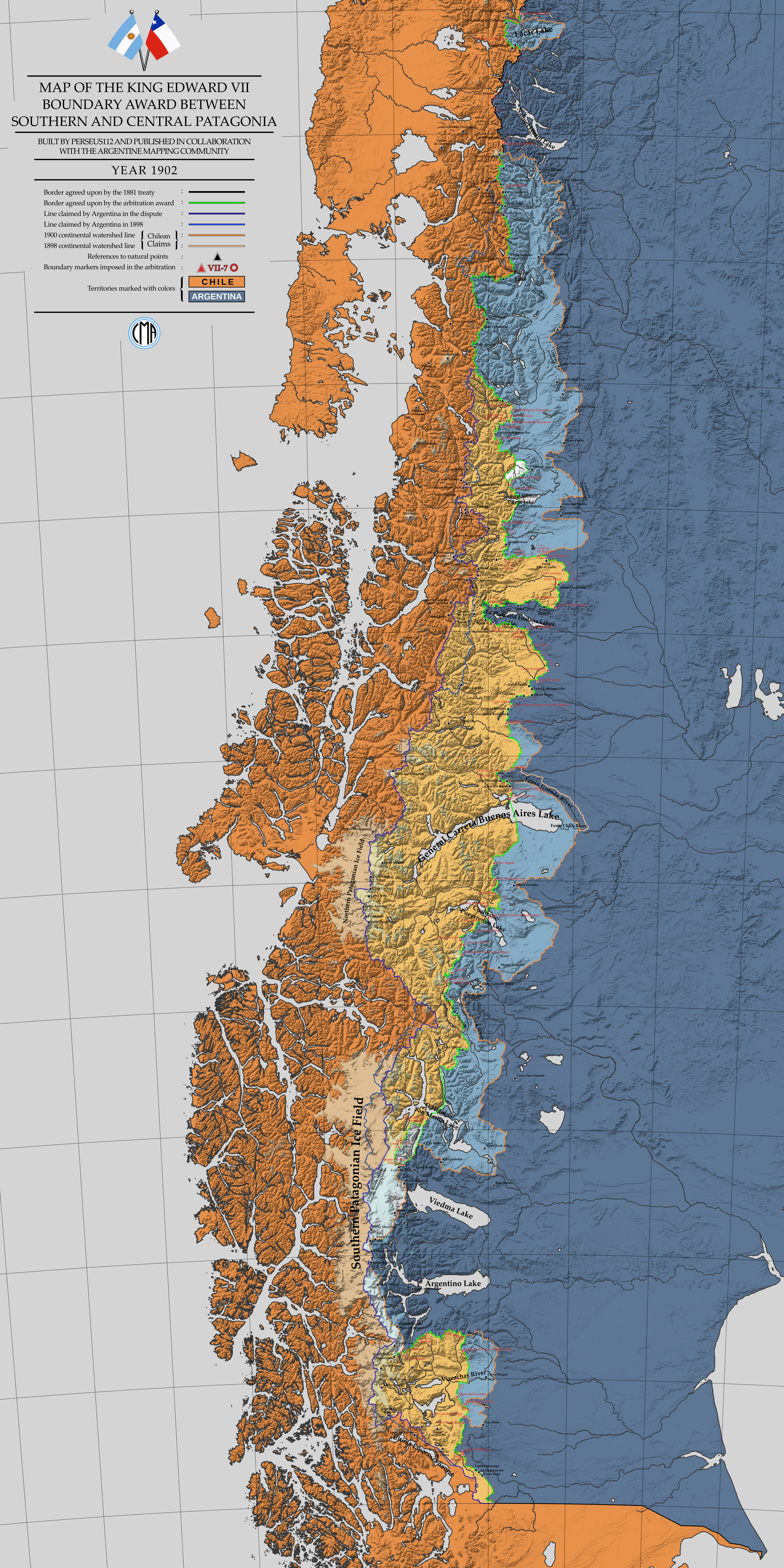
- Map of the territorial changes made after the 1902 Andes Boundary Case.
- Type: Bilateral treaty
- Signed: 20 November 1902
- Original signatories: Argentina; Chile

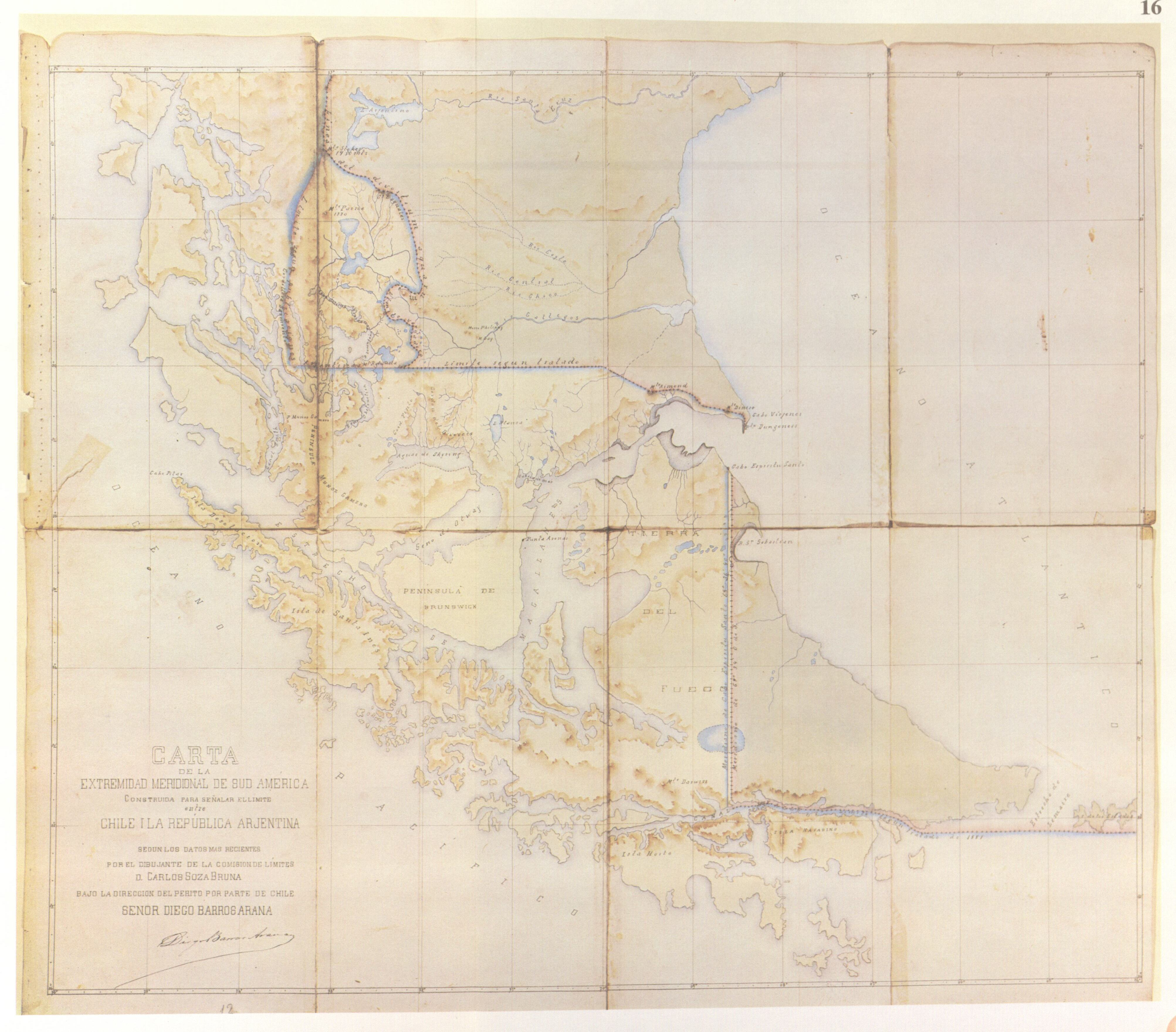
Report of the Chilean Expert on marking the frontier line Diego Barros Arana to his government showing the different interpretation of the 1881's treaty in Chile and Argentina

The 1902 Arbitral award of the Andes between Argentina and Chile (Spanish: Laudo limítrofe entre Argentina y Chile de 1902) was a British arbitration in 1902 that established the present-day boundaries between Argentina and Chile. In northern and central Patagonia, the borders were established between the latitudes of 40° and 52° S as an interpretation of the Boundary treaty of 1881 between Chile and Argentina.

As result of the arbitration, some Patagonian lakes, such as O'Higgins/San Martín Lake, became divided by a national boundary. Additionally the preferences of settled colonists in a cultivated part of the area in dispute had been canvassed. The boundary proposed in the arbitration was a compromise between the boundary preferences of the two disputing governments, which strictly followed neither the alignment of highest peaks nor the fluvial watershed, and was published in the name of King Edward VII.

== Background ==
As most South American states that emerged in the early 19th century based their border claims on the uti possidetis iuris a source of conflict was poorly mapped or vagueness of borders inherited from the Spanish colonial era. This was the case of Patagonia. The Boundary treaty of 1881 between Chile and Argentina solved this establishing much of the Argentina-Chile border but created much ambiguity in the interpretation of the border in Patagonia. In 1896 both countries decided to seek international mediation and in 1898 a formal request was made to the United Kingdom. According to Hans Steffen the United Kingdom was chosen as arbiter over France and United States since it enjoyed much sympathy in Argentina and Chile. In the case of Chile the United States' support for the losing faction of President Balmaceda in the Chilean Civil War of 1891 would –according to Steffen– have negatively impacted its influence.

== Preparations and geographic surveys ==
Hans Steffen was one of 180 German schoolteachers who arrived together in Chile in 1885. He would explore Patagonia, producing La divisoria de aguas, a work about the continental divide that was instrumental to the Chilean argument. Steffen later accused Argentinian explorer Francisco Pascasio Moreno of having knowligly used erroneous historical documents to support the Argentine claim to Patagonia. Among other things Moreno claimed without proof that Deseado River was reached by Simón de Alcazaba in 1535. Since this expedition described a large river this false identification was used by Moreno to claim large historical changes in the headwaters of Deseado River near General Carrera Lake, thus suggesting a connection of lake and the surrounding area to the Atlatic watershed in historic times.

== British arbitration ==
The escalation in tension between Chile and Argentina suggested armed conflict had become a distinct probability towards the end of the 19th Century as both had claims on Patagonia. The Argentinian Riccheri Law continued to provide for selective national service; the expansion of the Argentine armed forces after the campaigns and subjugation of the Pampas and expanded southwards and westwards into Patagonia in the "Conquest of the Desert". Argentina and Chile had successfully reached a measure of mutual agreement in the Boundary Treaty of 1881 and subsequently identified other boundary alignment issues to be resolved by binding arbitration under the 1902 "May Pact" and sought the involvement of the UK as mediator.

Commissioners Francisco Moreno (Argentina), Diego Barros Arana (Chile) and Sir Thomas Holdich (UK) visited the Andean Patagonian valleys to make site-based observations following the written submissions presented previously by the two parties to the Arbitration Panel.

Since 1885, the valleys of what is now northwestern Chubut Province had been settled by many Welsh emigrants. This area drains into the Pacific Ocean and was thus claimed by Chile. Subsequently, the commissioners visited Trevelin and received the views of the inhabitants of the "Colonia del Valle 16 de Octubre" on 30 April 1902, for three days, in School Number 18, which had been founded in 1895 next to the river Corintios by the Argentine National Government. The arbitration award was finally adjudicated in favour of the Republic of Argentina, and Trevelin, Esquel and other adjacent settlements were subsequently incorporated into Chubut Province.

Research by Gustavo De Vera and Jorge Fiori starting in 1998 was published as the "Winds of War" in 2002 to coincide with the centenary, for the Directorate of Culture, Trevelin, has investigated the background and events around the "1902 Referendum". They have concluded that the views of the inhabitants, whilst not the sole determinate, were certainly influential in founding an acceptable alignment for the national boundary in this part of Patagonia.

The next surveyors were in charge of the demarcation of the 1902 border:

- Lácar Lake to Nahuel Huapi Lake and Colonia 16 de Octubre, led by Bertram Dickson.
- General Carrera/Buenos Aires Lake and surrounding area, led by W. M. Thompson.
- O'Higgins/San Martín Lake and surrounding area, led by C. L. Robertson.
- Última Esperanza, led by Herbert Leland Crosthwait.

Led by Sir Thomas Holdich.

== Boundary ==
In some areas such as Aysén Region, the Chilean claims were partly agreed upon, giving Chile a foothold on the lakes and plains east of the Andes, while in some other areas the Argentine thesis of the Snowy Cordillera prevailed as the boundary. Two main maps were made, Gunnar Lange's (1901) and Herbert Leland Crosthwait's (1903).

== Disputes over parts of the award boundary ==
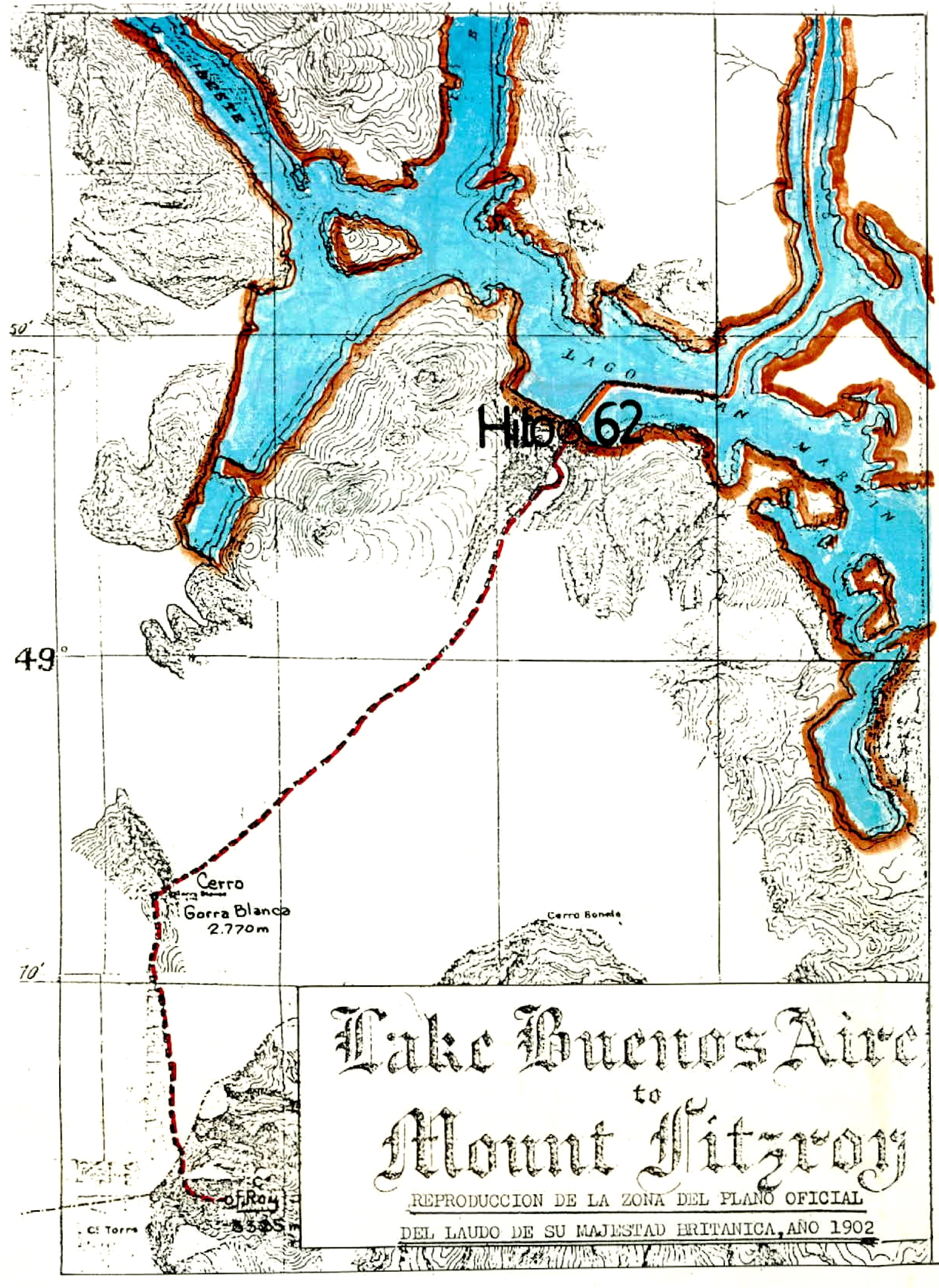
1902 referee map, originally made by the Argentinian engineer Gunnar Lange.

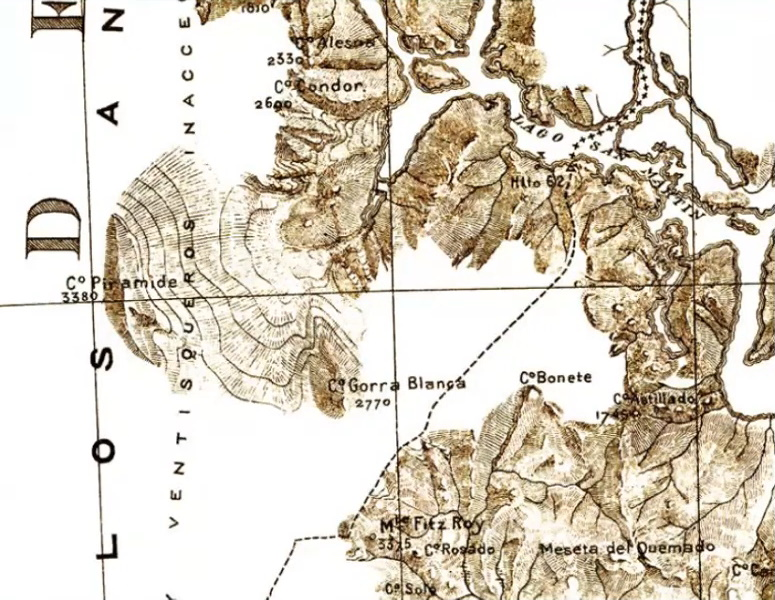
1903 Herbert Leland Crosthwait British demarcator map

Two disputes emerged from the 1902 border, the Alto Palena–Encuentro River dispute and the Laguna del Desierto dispute. The first one was settled in 1966 and revolved around the location of the Encuentro River discovered by Hans Steffen in 1894, and the second one around the area of Del Desierto Lake, settled in favor of Argentina in 1994.

In the arbitrator's map, the cartography prepared by the Argentine engineer Gunnar Lange in 1901 was used, who confused the El Salto River with the Encuentro River (mentioned in the 1902 award), placing the origin of the latter at the Cerro de la Virgen, which was thus named by Lange on his map. However, this river originates from the Picacho de la Virgen, named after the hill, becoming a key factor in the dispute; it is El Salto that originates from the hill named by Lange. The Picacho de la Virgen (still unnamed at the time) was identified by the British demarcator Bertram Dickson as the source of the Encuentro River in 1903, describing it as located farther east than the boundary marker (hito) 17 placed during the demarcation.

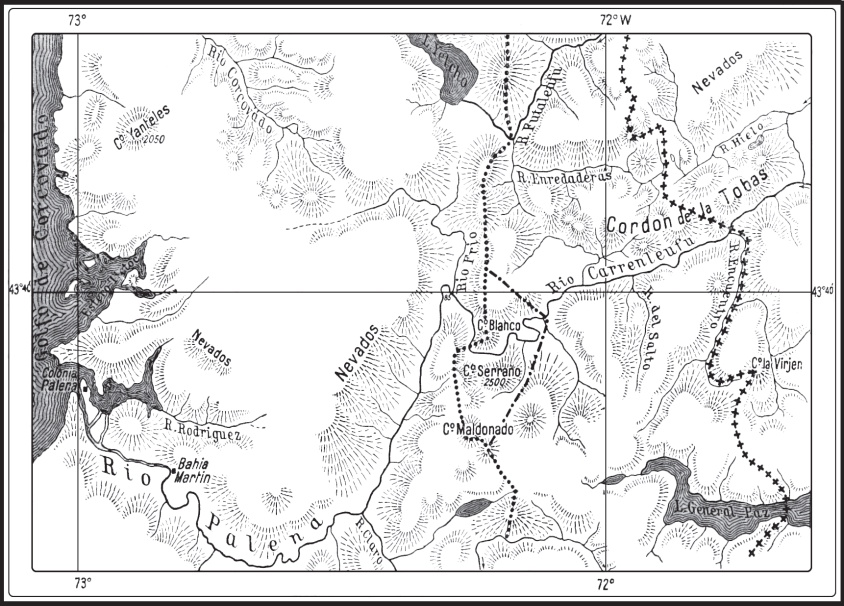
Map showing the boundaries established on the Palena River by the Chilean-Argentine Boundary Commission, accused by Hans Steffen of lacking accurate topographical information, specifically regarding the Encuentro River. The cartography was also questioned in the 1940s.

As the intersection point of the border line with the Palena, the Arbitral Tribunal defined a place "in front of the confluence with the Río Encuentro", a southern tributary of the Palena that Hans Steffen had named so because at its confluence the meeting between two detachments of the Chilean expedition to the Palena occurred on February 6, 1894. According to the official account of Bertram Dickson, on March 2, 1903, they left the Steinkamp camp and descended to the supposed Río Encuentro, where they met with Argentine engineer Eimar Soot. Initially, they identified a small stream as the Río Encuentro, and both Soot and the Chilean representative Barrios agreed to erect the border pyramid there, despite it not appearing on the available maps. A week later, upon receiving additional maps, Dickson discovered the error and returned on March 13 with the Argentine engineer Emil Frey, finding a larger river several miles to the west.

Barrios and Dickson agreed that this second river was the true Río Encuentro, but Frey disagreed, suggesting another river further east. After a failed exploration, Frey accepted the second site on March 15. Steffen criticizes that neither the arbitral commissioner, nor the heads of the Argentine and Chilean commissions knew the topography and nomenclature of the region, despite the maps presented to the tribunal and his own Memoria general on the Chilean expedition to the Palena providing sufficient data to identify the river correctly. The doubt about whether the final site chosen by Dickson corresponded to Steffen's original Río Encuentro persisted until the 1966 award. In 1941, the cartography that had served as the basis for demarcation by the Chilean-Argentine Boundary Commission was accused of suffering from serious errors, which led to tensions during the 1950s between both countries.

In the Laguna del Desieto Valley, in the Gunnar Lange map, the Gorra Blanca mountain was included in the border drawing, while in the 1903 British demarcator map of Herbert Leland Crosthwait it was not included. The Del Desierto Lake, located between Mount Fitz Roy and boundary marker 62, was discovered in 1921 by Chilean settlers. The dispute was resolved in 1994 with the ruling of an arbitration tribunal under the 1984 Treaty of Peace and Friendship.

About the Southern Patagonian Ice Field, on 20 May 1902, King Edward VII sentenced in the 3rd article of the Arbitral award:

From Mount Fitz Roy to Mount Stokes the boundary line has already been determined.

The border was defined in 1898 and was agreed between experts, Barros Arana and Moreno, from both countries in the area of the Southern Patagonian Ice Field, the large ice-covered area in the Patagonian Andes. The mountains mentioned by Moreno are: Fitz Roy, Torre, Huemul, Campana, Agassiz, Heim, Mayo, and Stokes/Cervantes. Later on border discussions emerged.
