= Thomas Holdich =

British geographer

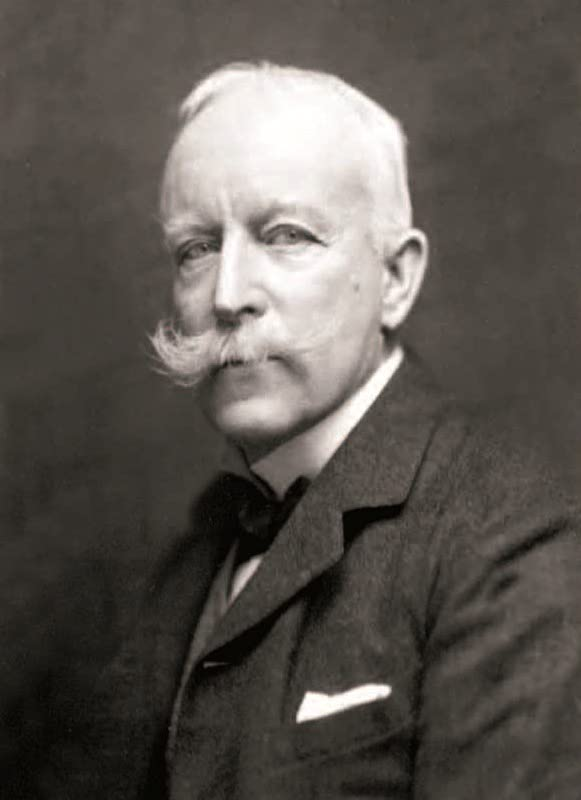
Colonel Thomas Holdich.

Colonel Sir Thomas Hungerford Holdich KCMG KCIE CB FRGS (13 February 1843 – 2 November 1929) was an English geographer and president of the Royal Geographical Society. He is best known as Superintendent of Frontier Surveys in British India, arbiter in the Cordillera of the Andes Boundary Case and author of numerous books, including The Gates of India, The Countries of the King's Award and Political Frontiers and Boundary Making.

== Life ==
Born in Dingley, Northamptonshire, England to the Rev. Thomas Peach Holdich, he was educated at Godolphin Grammar School and the Royal Military Academy, obtaining a commission in the Royal Engineers in 1862. He saw active service in the Bhutan expedition of 1865, the Abyssinian campaign of 1867–68 and the Second Anglo-Afghan War of 1878–79. Harold Adrian Holdich was his son born in 1874.

During peacetime, Holdich was largely occupied with the survey of India. He was the chief surveyor on the Afghan Boundary Commission of 1884–86. The Commission soon found itself in the midst of a crisis, inflamed by the Panjdeh incident; when this nearly led to war with Russia, Holdich was put in charge of fortifying Herat against a potential Russian invasion. He later served on the Tasmar Boundary Commission of 1894, the Pamir Boundary Commission of 1895 and the Perso-Baluchistan Boundary Commission of 1896. He was awarded the Founder's Medal of the Royal Geographical Society in 1887 in recognition of his work on the Afghan frontier.

Holdich was also member of the British tribunal engaged in The Cordillera of the Andes Boundary Case by the governments of Argentina and Chile in 1902 to arbitrate the boundary along the Andes Mountains. For this service he was appointed a Knight Commander of the Order of St Michael and St George (KCMG) in December 1902.

On his retirement to half-pay in 1898, he thanked "that providence which had been good to me in that during that last year of my Indian career I had been able to put a round finish on the last of our frontier maps". He was placed on the Retired list with an Indian pension 13 February 1900.

In later years, he wrote and lectured extensively on geographical issues, and served as president of the Royal Geographical Society from 1917 to 1919. He also served as President of the Geographical Association between 1917 and 1918. He contributed a number of entries to the eleventh edition of the Encyclopædia Britannica.

Boundaries are the inevitable product of advancing civilisation; they are human inventions not necessarily supported by nature's dispositions, and as such they are only of solid value so long as they can be made strong enough and secure enough to prevent their violation and infringement. – Sir Thomas Hungerford Holdich (1916)

His thought on international boundaries emphasized rationality and their necessity as tools to "civilize" and transform territories. In his view borders had a need for them to be, or have the potential to become, militarily strong. Holdich also expressed his reservations about natural borders considering them prone to conflicts.

Holdich died in 1929 at his home at Parklands in Merrow, Surrey, near Guildford, at the age of 86.

== List of publications ==
- T H Holdich. (Editor). Peru-Bolivia Boundary Commission Report 1911-1913. 1918.
- T H Holdich. Boundaries in Europe and the Near East, 1918.
- T H Holdich. Frontiers and Boundary Making, 1916.
- T H Holdich, Leonard Arthur Bethell and Hamilton Bower. The Abor Expedition: Geographical Results: Discussion. Geographical Journal, Feb., 1913, vol. 41, no. 2, pages 109–114.
- T H Holdich. Gates of India, Being an Historical Narrative of Early Relations Between the East and the West, 1910.
- T H Holdich. Tibet, the Mysterious, 1906.
- T H Holdich. Countries of the King's Award, 1904.
- T H Holdich. England's Strength in Asia. Proceedings of the Central Asian Society, 1904.
- T H Holdich. Indian Borderland 1880–1900, 1901.
- M. G. Gerard, T. H. Holdrich, R. A. Wahab, A. W. Alcock. Report on the proceedings of the Pamir Boundary Commission. Calcutta: Office of the Superintendent of Government Printing, India. 1897.
- T H Holdich. Notes on the Antiquities, Ethnography and History of Las Bela and Makran, 1894.
- "The Frontier Question" . The Empire and the century. London: John Murray. 1905. pp. 651–662.

== Family ==
Holdich was married to Ada Vanrenen, and had two daughters and two sons. His elder daughter Laura Holdich married in 1898 Major Edmund Peach (1865–1902), Indian Staff Corps.

== See also ==
- Herbert Leland Crosthwait
- Bertram Dickson

== Bibliography ==
- Bello Maldonado, Álvaro (2023). "Las fronteras como "espacios conjeturales" sir Thomas H. Holdich y la mirada imperial de la Patagonia (1860-1915)". In Harambour, Alberto; Serje, Margarita (eds.). La Era del Imperio y las Fronteras de la Civilización en América del sur (in Spanish). Bogotá-Santiago: Ediciones UniAndes-Pehuén. pp. 37–65. ISBN 9789587985108.
