= Grinnell Willis =

American merchant and philanthropist (1848–1930)

Grinnell Willis (1848-1930) was a textile merchant and philanthropist, and the son of noted poet Nathaniel Parker Willis. Willis founded and ran Grinnell Willis & Company. He also funded several civic projects in the Morristown, New Jersey area.

== Early life and education ==
Willis was born to Nathaniel Parker Willis and Cornellia Grinnell Willis in New York City on April 28, 1848. He grew up in Idlewild, his family's country estate near Cornwall-on-Hudson on the banks of the Hudson River in New York state. His brother was Bailey Willis. After preparing for college with William Atkinson, Willis entered Harvard University in Cambridge, Massachusetts in 1866. While at Harvard, he played on the varsity rowing team and served as captain of the Class of 1870 Boat Club. Willis graduated from Harvard in 1870.

== Merchant career ==
After graduating from college, Willis joined the commission house of Almy & Co. He worked for the company and then its successor, Lewis Brothers & Co., until 1889. In 1879, Willis began overseeing their business relationship with Wamsutta Mills, a textile manufacturer (now a brand of Springs Global). He founded Grinnell Willis & Co. in 1889.

== Philanthropy ==
Willis served on the Board of Trustees of Morristown School (now Morristown-Beard School) for 15 years (1905-1920) and as board president for 12 years (1908-1920). He donated funds to help construct a gymnasium for the school and its Headmaster House (now the school's Alumni House). Willis dedicated the gymnasium fund to his wife Mary Baker Hadock Willis.

During World War I, Willis served with the Morristown Infantry Battalion of the New Jersey Militia Reserve. After a fire severely damaged the Morristown Library and Lyceum, he and Samuel Gillespie funded the conversion of the structure into the Morristown Armory. In 1917, Willis donated $56,000 to fund the construction of a new library for Morristown. He also gave donations to create the building's children's room and a $200,000 fund to meet future needs.

== Family ==
Willis married Mary Baker Haydock Willis on October 24, 1874. They had three children together: Hannah Haydock Willis (1875-1961), Cornelia Grinnell Willis (1877-1968), and Joseph Grinnell Willis (1879-1919). After Mary died in 1911, Willis married Katherine Tappert, the librarian at Morristown's public library.
