= Paul Robert Hanna =

Paul Robert Hanna (1902–1988) was an American professor of education. He wrote books and journals in the educational field and was a leader in elementary education.

== Biography ==
Hanna was born in Sioux City, Iowa on June 21, 1902, to George Archibald Hanna, a Methodist minister, and Regula Figi Hanna, the daughter of Swiss immigrants. Hanna spent most of his youth in Minnesota. He graduated from high school in 1920 and married Jean Shuman in 1926. Paul and Jean Hanna had two sons and a daughter. The Hannas had eight grandchildren and two great-grandchildren.

Throughout his school and college years, Hanna belonged to many organizations such as the Kappa Delta Rho, Student Council, and the Extemporaneous Team. He attended college from 1924 to 1929 to earn his Ph.D. degree which led him to become a teacher in Washington State University and in 1935 became an associate professor at Stanford University (Nelson). He studied and taught elementary education, social studies, and he had improved the education of spelling as well as had his say in the international development of education. Additionally, he consulted public schools and revised their curriculum.

Hanna taught and developed a wide variety of courses. He advised on doctoral dissertations, founded the Stanford International Development Education Center (SIDEC), served on the Board of Trustees of Castilleja from 1957 to 1981, and worked as a senior researcher in the Hoover Institution in his last years to generate the Hanna Collection. Hanna wrote over eighty educational essays, sixteen books and several yearbooks before he died at age 85, on April 8, 1988.

The Hanna–Honeycomb House was designed for Hanna by Frank Lloyd Wright. It is listed on the U.S. National Register of Historic Places.

== See also ==
- International education
- Service-learning
