= Harwell Hamilton and Jean Bangs Harris House and Office =

Historic house in North Carolina, United States

- U.S. National Register of Historic Places
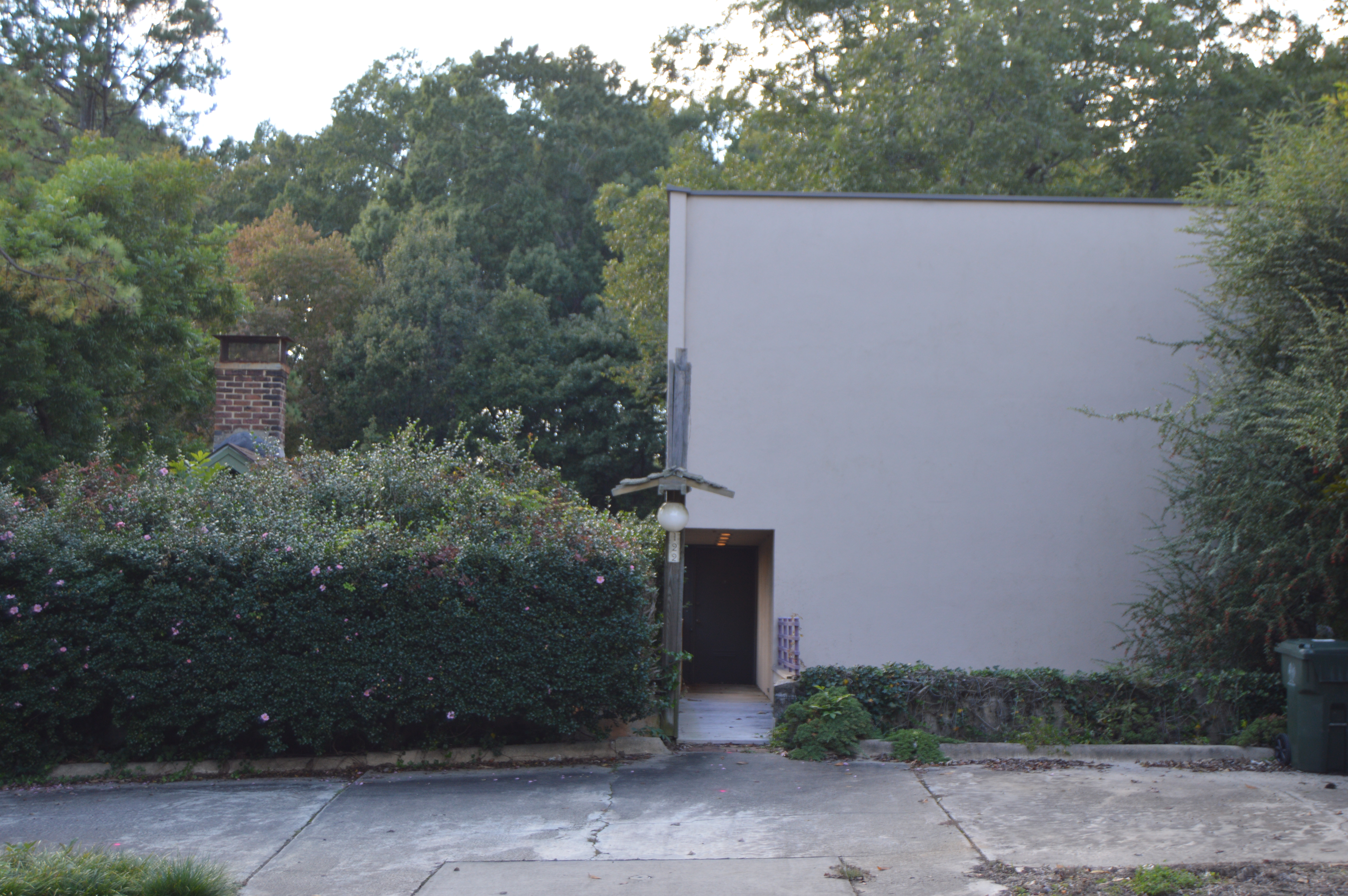
- Front

- Location within North Carolina Location within the United States
- Location: 122 Cox Ave., Raleigh, North Carolina
- Coordinates: 35°47′02″N 78°39′39″W
- Area: 0.17 acres (0.069 ha)
- Built: 1968-1970, 1977
- Architect: Harwell Hamilton Harris
- Architectural style: Modern Movement
- MPS: Early Modern Architecture Associated with NCSU School of Design Faculty MPS
- NRHP reference No.: 10001098
- Added to NRHP: December 28, 2010

Harwell Hamilton and Jean Bangs Harris House and Office is a historic home and office located at Raleigh, Wake County, North Carolina. It was designed by architect Harwell Hamilton Harris (1903-1990) and is a two-story, Modern Movement style dwelling. The stucco-clad modular building was constructed in 1968–1970, with an addition completing the original design made in 1977. It originally housed Harris's architectural practice on the second floor and the couple's home and a rental apartment on the ground floor. It served Harris and his wife during their final working years as their office and retirement home.

It was listed on the National Register of Historic Places in 2010.
