= Harwell Hamilton Harris =

American architect

- Born: July 2, 1903; Redlands, California
- Died: November 18, 1990 (aged 87); Raleigh, North Carolina
- Occupation: Architect
- Awards: American Institute of Architects College of Fellows (FAIA) Neutra Medal, California State Polytechnic University, Pomona

Harwell Hamilton Harris, FAIA (July 2, 1903 – November 18, 1990) was a modernist American architect, noted for his work in Southern California that assimilated European and American influences. He lived and worked in North Carolina from 1962 until his death in 1990.

== Biography ==
Harris was born in Redlands, California in 1903. He began his studies at Pomona College but left after a year to study sculpture at the Otis Art Institute, now Otis College of Art and Design. In 1928, he began apprenticing under architect Richard Neutra with whom he was associated until 1932. He worked alongside Gregory Ain, and the two of them assisted one another as independent designers after leaving Neutra in the mid-1930s.

Adopting Neutra's modernist sensibility, Harris merged the vernacular of California with a sensitivity to site and materials characteristic of the American Arts & Crafts Movement. In his residential work of the 1930s and 1940s, primarily in California, Harris created a tension and a continuum between exterior and interior with continuous rooflines. Learning from Frank Lloyd Wright, he designed interior spaces that are often based on the cruciform plan. His work is characterized by a careful use of materials and clean, fluid spaces.

From 1952 until 1955, Harris served as the Dean for the School of Architecture of the University of Texas. The group of modernist architects he attracted to the faculty there came to be known as The Texas Rangers. In 1955, he left the university and established a private practice in Dallas, which he maintained until 1962 when he moved to Raleigh, North Carolina where he re-established his practice and began teaching at North Carolina State University. He retired from teaching in 1973 but continued to practice architecture from his home studio in Raleigh until shortly before his death there on November 18, 1990. His home and studio at Raleigh, the Harwell Hamilton and Jean Bangs Harris House and Office, was listed on the National Register of Historic Places in 2011.

The ACSA (Association of Collegiate Schools of Architecture) honored Harris with the ACSA Distinguished Professor Award in 1986–87.

Harris' archive is located at the University of Texas.

== Buildings and projects ==
- Pauline Lowe House, Altadena, CA (1934-2025; Destroyed due to the Eaton Fire in January 2025.)
- Fellowship Park House, Los Angeles, CA (1936)
- John Entenza House, Los Angeles, CA (1937)
- Weston Havens House, 255 Panoramic Way Berkeley, California, NRHP-listed
- Havens House, Berkeley, CA (1939)
- Wylie House, Ojai, California (1948)
- J.J. Mulvihill Residence, Sierra Madre, California (1949), Landscape by John T. Lyle
- Cranfill Apartments, Austin, Texas (1960)
- Eisenberg House, Dallas, Texas from Texas Archive of the Moving Image
- St. Mary's Episcopal Church, Big Spring, Texas (1960)
