= Weston Havens House =

Historic house in Berkeley, California

- U.S. National Register of Historic Places
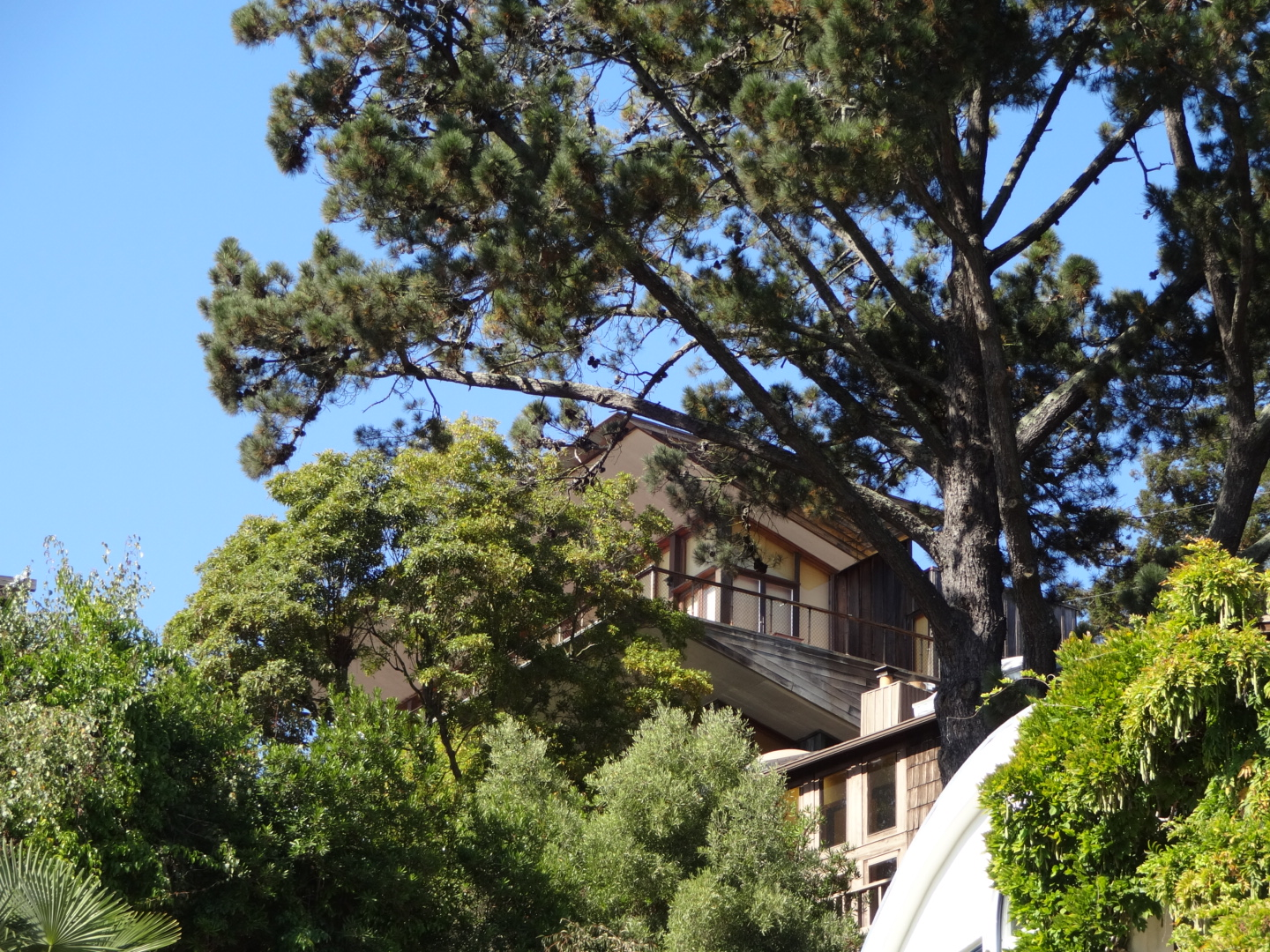
- Weston Havens House

- Location within California
- Location: 255 Panoramic Way, Berkeley, California
- Coordinates: 37°52′15″N 122°14′50″W
- Area: less than one acre
- Built: 1940
- Architect: Harwell Hamilton Harris
- Architectural style: Moderne, International Style
- NRHP reference No.: 05000597
- Added to NRHP: June 11, 2008

The Weston Havens House is a historic Modernist and International Style house in the Panoramic Hill neighborhood of Berkeley, California, built in 1940. John Weston Havens Jr. (1903–2001) commissioned the architect Harwell Hamilton Harris (1903–1990) to design a custom house suited to Havens' interests and preferences.

The Weston Havens House was listed on the National Register of Historic Places on June 11, 2008. It is recognized as an example of regional California Modernist style, with its radical design that looks outward from the hill to a view of the Pacific, along with its use of materials such as Douglas fir and redwood.

== Original owner ==
Havens was the last direct descendant of Berkeley founder, Francis Kittredge Shattuck, and built the house with part of his inheritance. Havens wanted a beautiful private home suited for entertaining guests, listening to music, displaying his collection of antique Asian art, and playing badminton in a courtyard with large amounts of plants. Havens was a gay man, and the house has been referenced in scholarly works about queer space.

== Architecture ==
The Weston Havens House has been compared to Frank Lloyd Wright’s Fallingwater house. The house has a unique truss system that supports the roof, main floor, and lower floors. The trusses are made of three inverted triangular beams. Harris built the house of unfinished redwood. The large windows give an 180-degree panorama of the San Francisco Bay.

The house has not been changed, but it is vulnerable to weather damage and has needed repairs, for example after winter storms in winter 2002.

== Impact and legacy ==
In 1941 Man Ray photographed the interior and exterior of the house, and these photos were published in many magazines.

Upon Havens' death in 2001, he bequeathed the house to the University of California. The UC Berkeley College of Environmental Design takes care of the property and provides limited access for tours and other educational purposes. Original drawings and other materials related to the house are in the Environmental Design Archives at the UC Berkeley College of Environmental Design.

== Photos ==
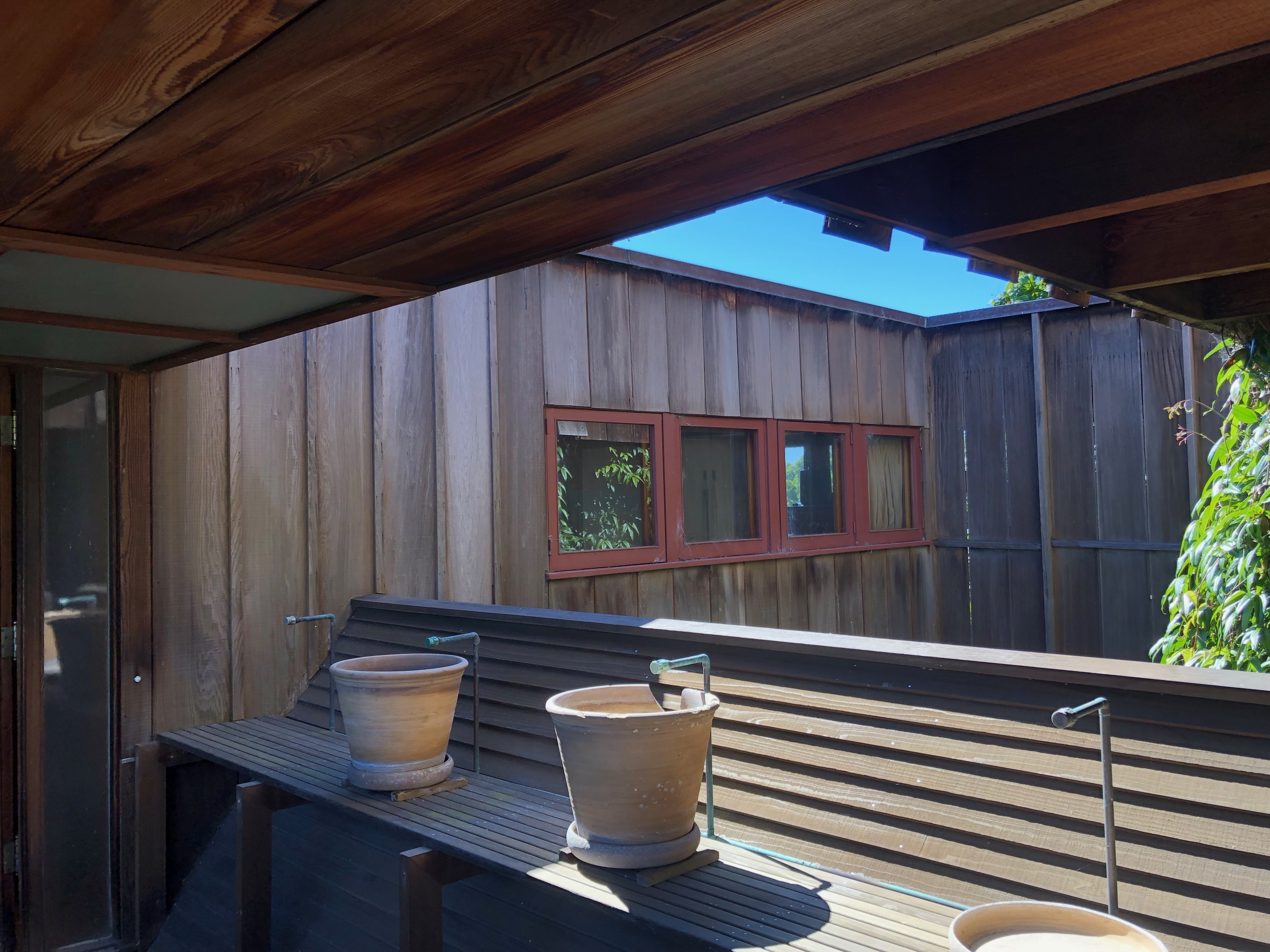
Entrance bridge with irrigation

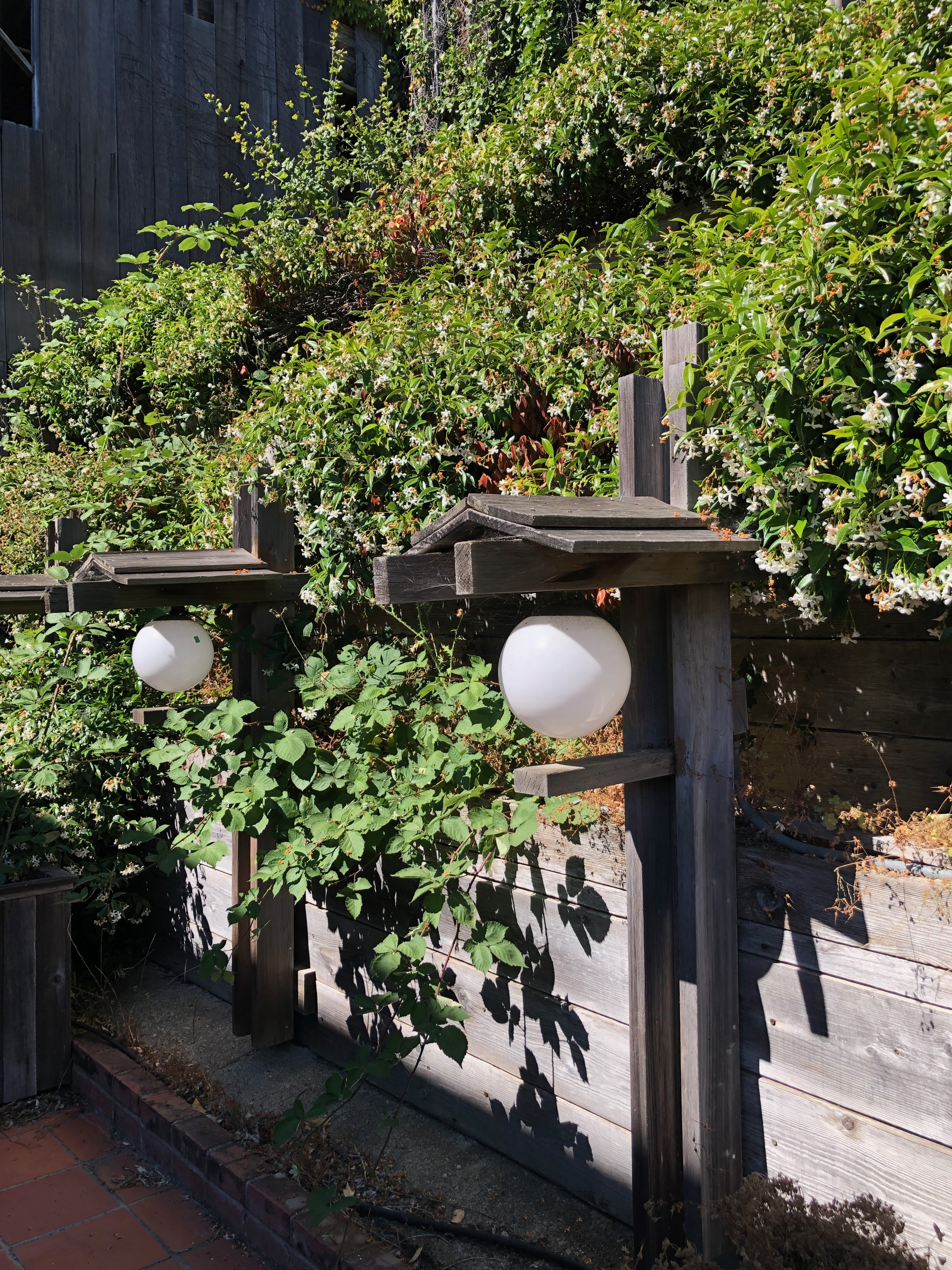
Courtyard garden lights

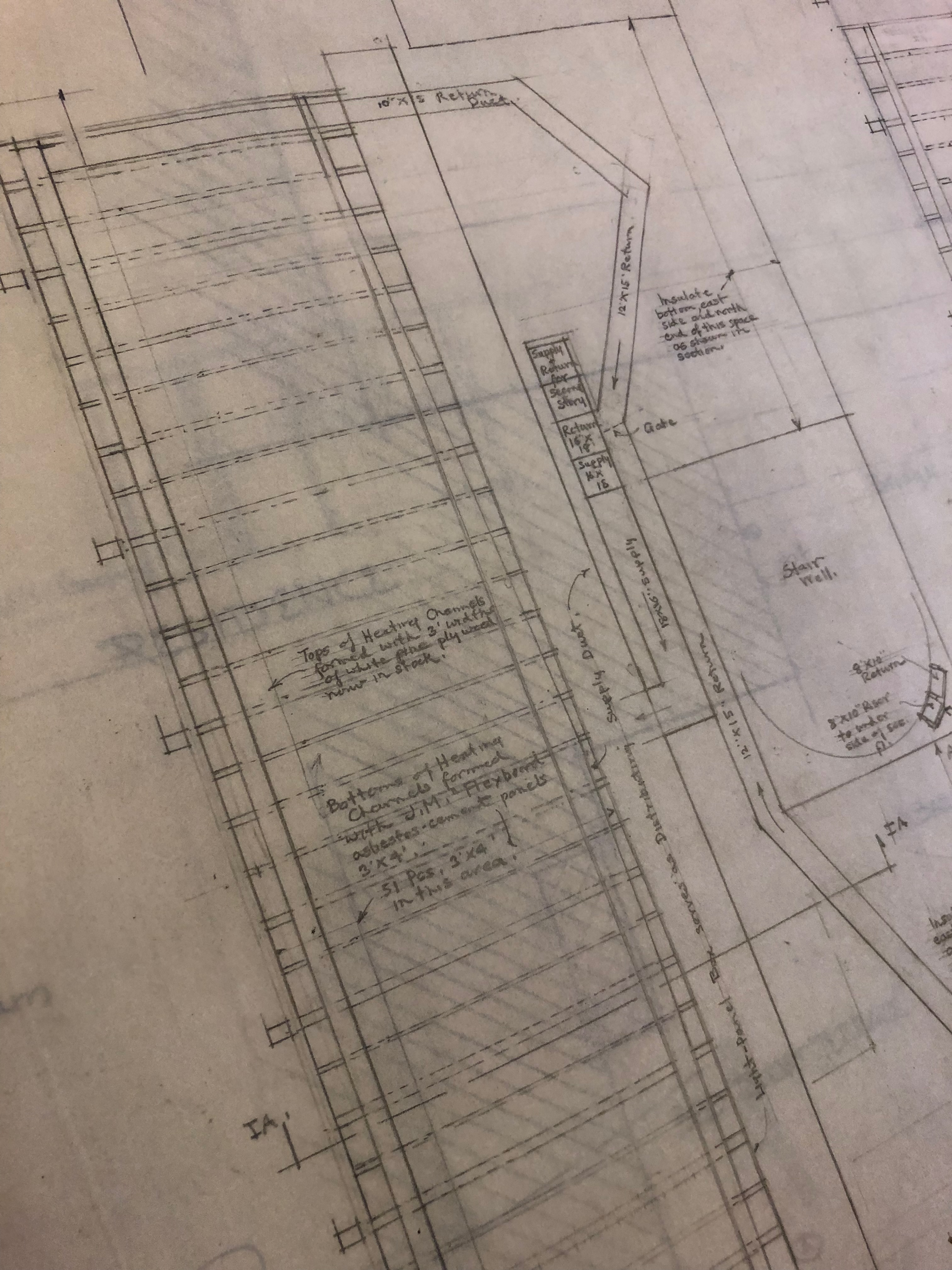
Part of a mechanical drawing of the heating system

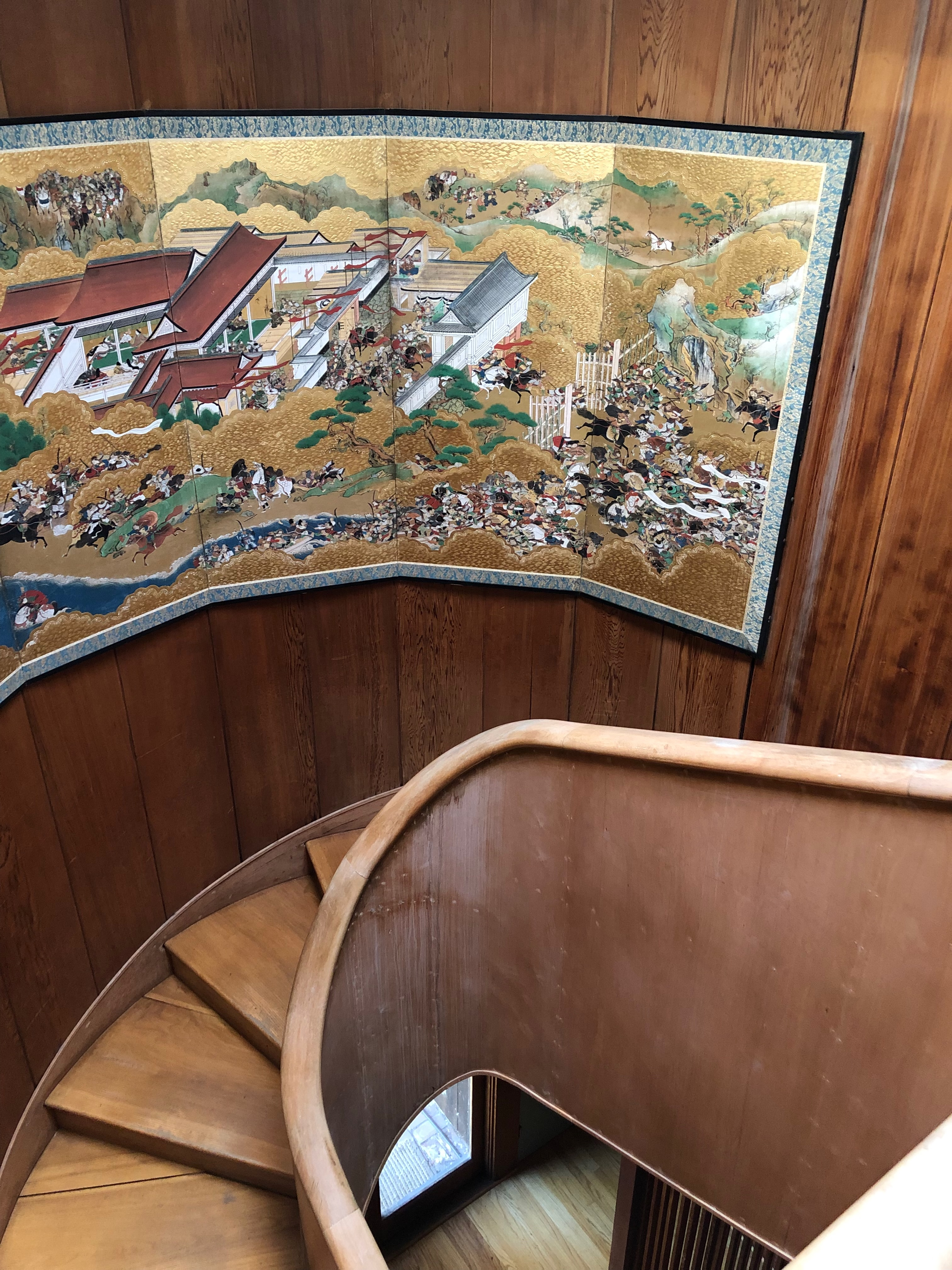
Havens decorated with items from his Asian art collection

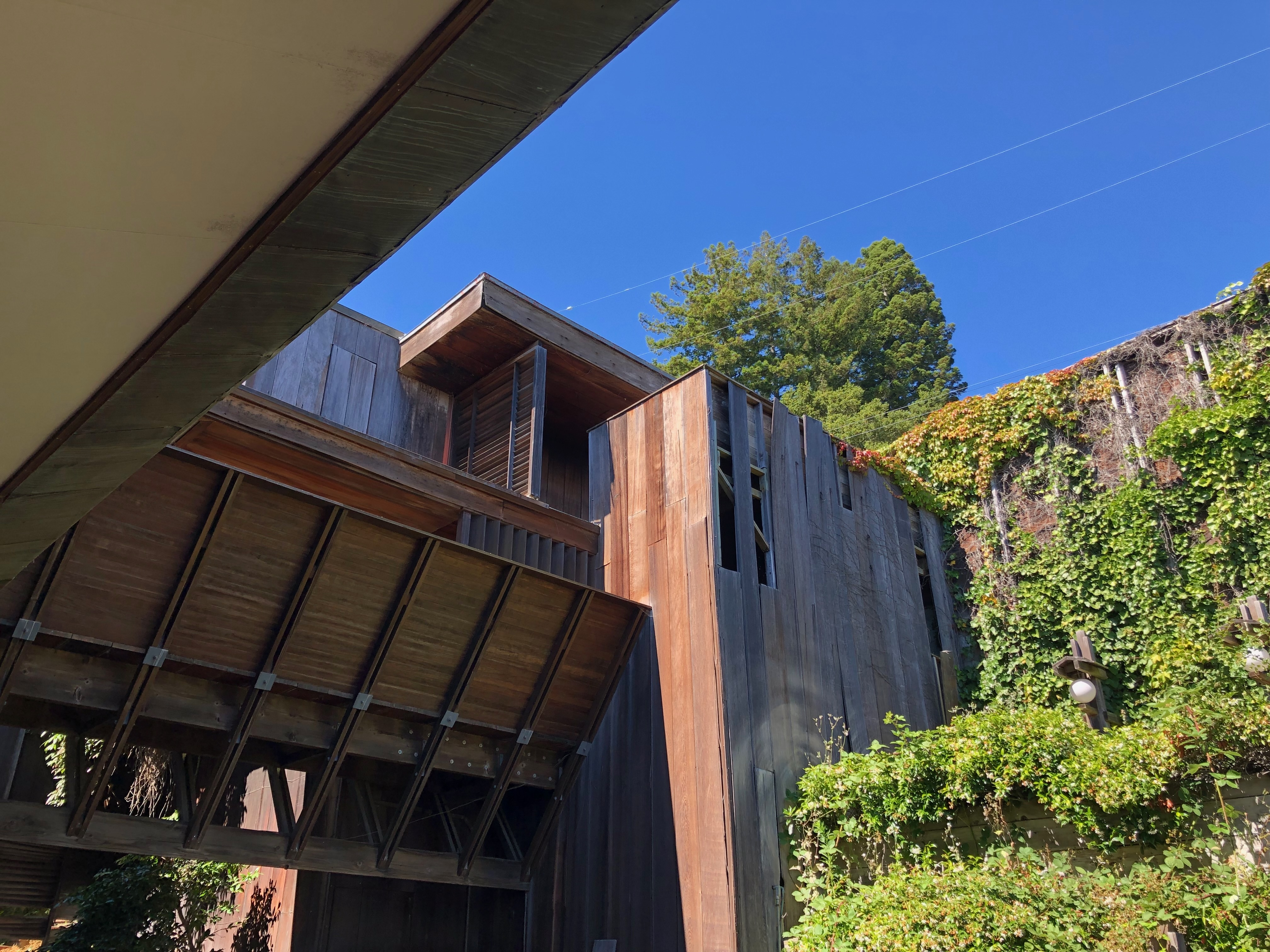
Entrance bridge over the courtyard area

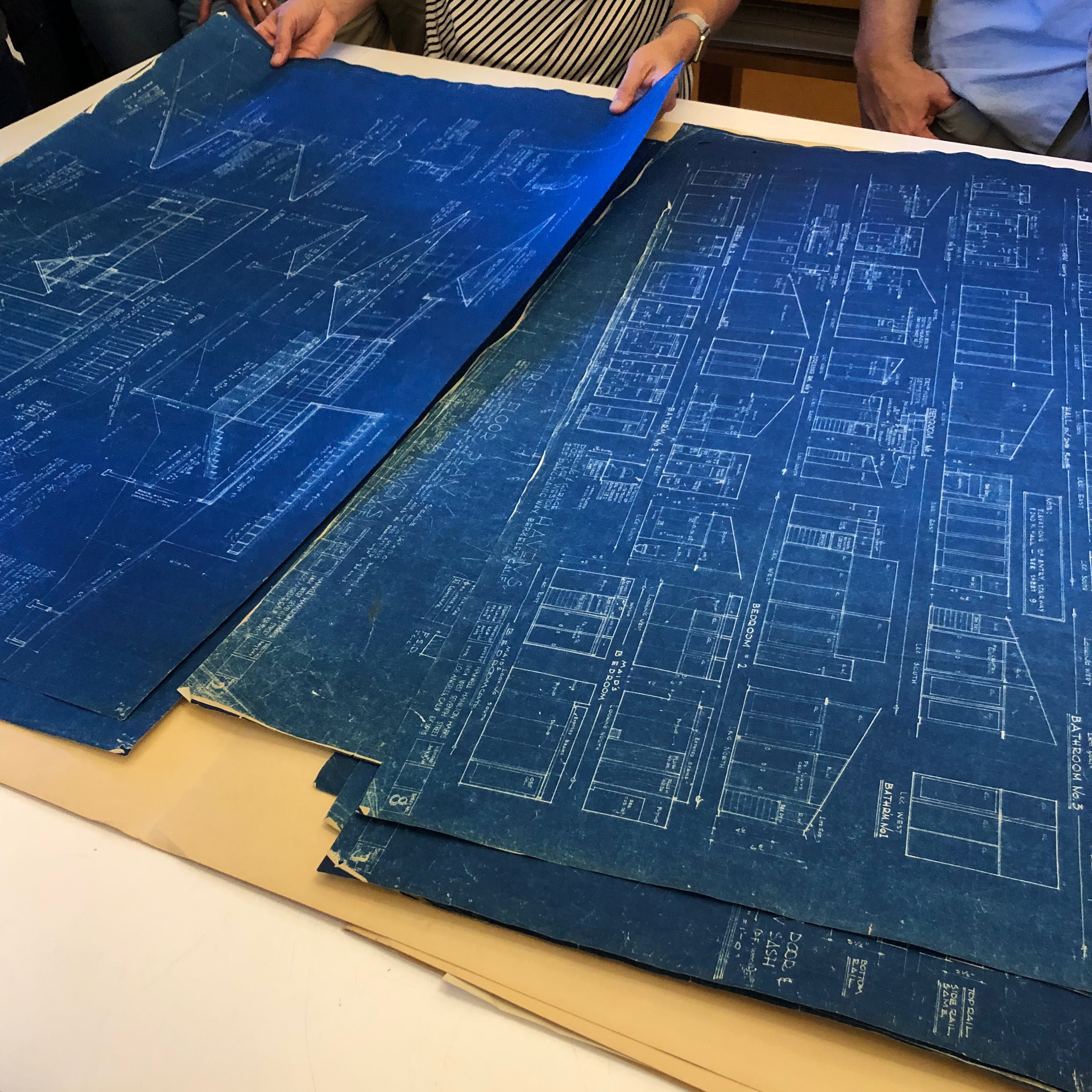
Blueprints in the archives

== See also ==
- Donald and Helen Olsen House
- Hodgkins and Skubic House
- National Register of Historic Places listings in Alameda County, California
- List of Berkeley Landmarks in Berkeley, California

== Bibliography ==
- Serraino, Pierluigi (August 3, 2006). NorCalMod: Icons of Northern California Modernist Architecture. Chronicle Books. pp. 40–41. ISBN 978-0-8118-4353-9.
- Germany, Lisa (January 1, 2000). Harwell Hamilton Harris. University of California Press. p. 85. ISBN 978-0-520-22619-7.
- Watts, Jennifer A. (December 4, 2012). Maynard L. Parker: Modern Photography and the American Dream. Yale University Press. p. 113. ISBN 978-0-300-17115-0.
- Kaplan, Wendy (2011). California Design, 1930–1965: Living In a Modern Way. MIT Press. p. 127. ISBN 978-0-262-29986-2.
- Emanuel, Muriel (January 23, 2016). Contemporary Architects. Springer. p. 347. ISBN 978-1-349-04184-8.
- Mallgrave, Harry Francis (July 13, 2009). Modern Architectural Theory: A Historical Survey, 1673–1968. Cambridge University Press. p. 336. ISBN 978-1-139-44340-1.
