= Emilio Frey =

Argentine geographer (1872–1964)

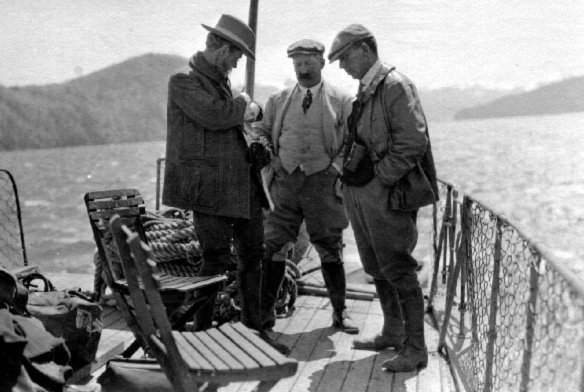
Left to right: Bailey Willis, Lugrubuel, and Emilio Frey, 1911

Emilio Enrique Frey (February 2, 1872 – May 29, 1964) was an Argentine geographer of Swiss descent.

== Life ==
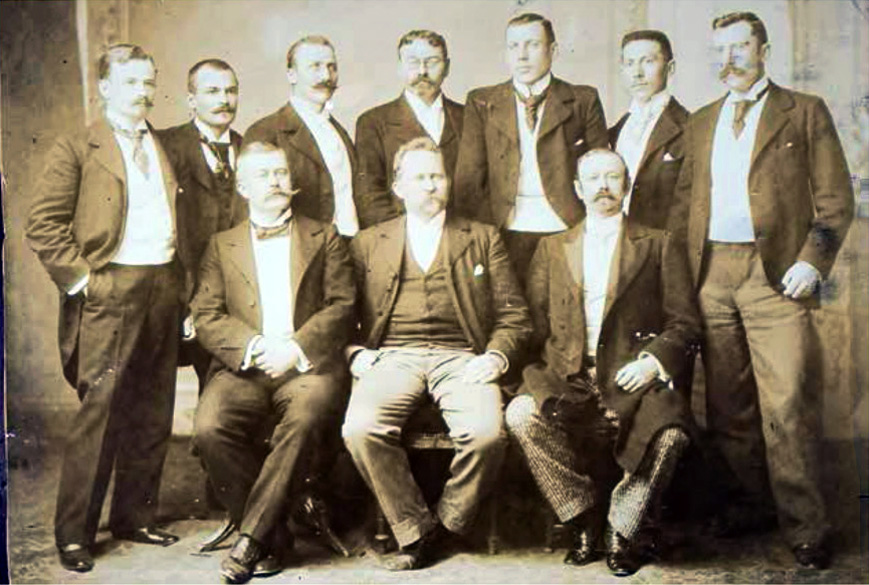
Sección Topográfica del Museo de La Plata.

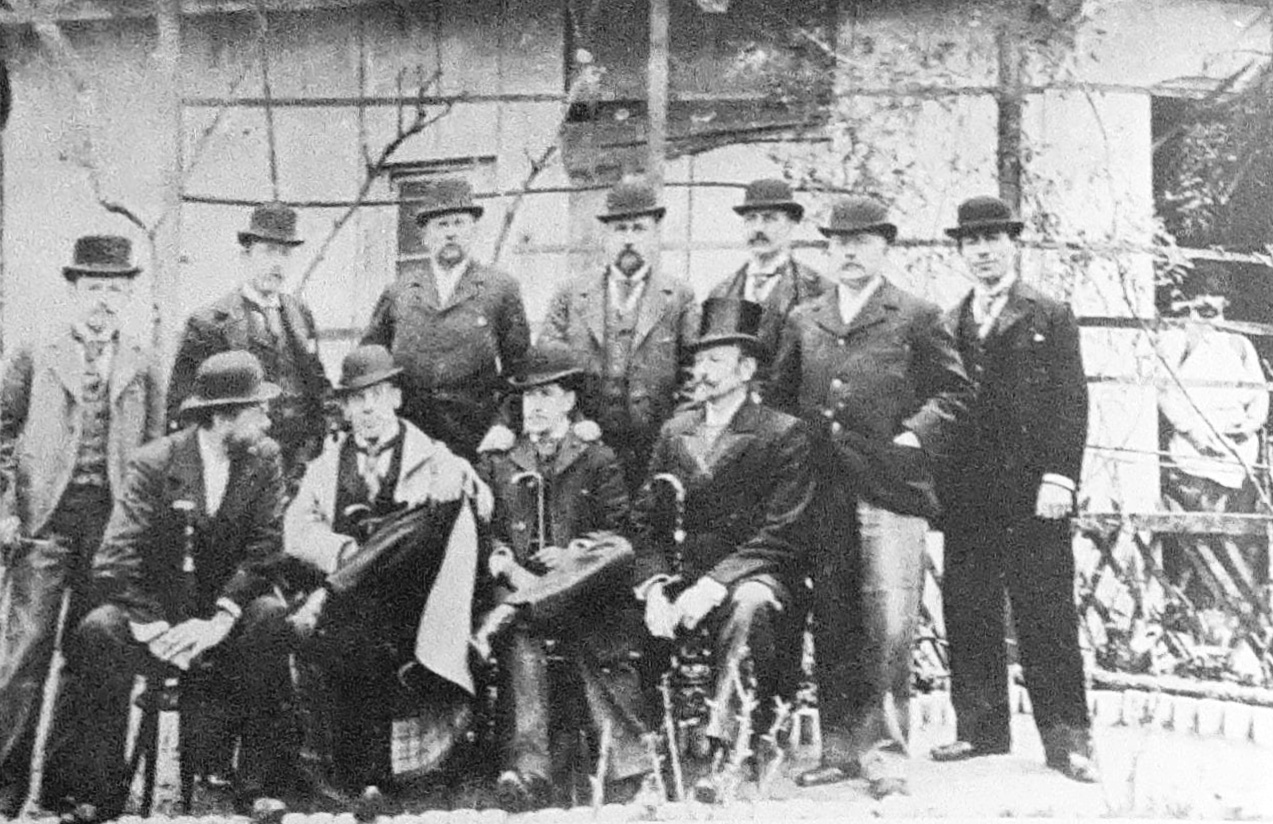
Comisión exploradora del museo de La Plata.

Frey was born in Baradero, Argentina, as the oldest of nine children. His father was a Swiss immigrant and farmer of the Swiss colony at Baradero, Buenos Aires Province, his mother was Argentine.

He attended school in Switzerland from 1884 through 1892, staying first with his grandfather Rudolf Frey in Zurich, then continuing at the Technikum in Winterthur, today part of the Zürcher Hochschule für Angewandte Wissenschaften, where he studied cartography and got an engineering degree in 1892.

Dr. Francisco P. Moreno, called Perito Moreno, asked Frey to join the Comisión de Limites Argentina-Chile in 1896. This commission was charged with the representation of Argentine interests in the border disputes with Chile, as the former treaty reached in 1881 Boundary treaty of 1881 between Chile and Argentina was contested by both countries. Many expeditions to the relevant parts of Patagonia were necessary. Frey could apply all his knowledge in topography and geography acquired in Europe. He discovered lakes such as Cholila, Rivadavia and Epuyen and produced maps.

During intense discussions the British government acted as arbiter between Chilean and Argentine interests resulting in a new treaty in 1902 Treaty of Arbitration between Chile and Argentina of 1902.

The Argentine minister for agriculture Ramos Mejia established another commission to study the hydrology of Northern Patagonia in 1910, which was led by professor Bailey Willis, a US geologist. Frey was his Argentine deputy. When they reached one of the lakes discovered by Frey earlier, which was not yet officially named, Willis proposed to call it Lago Frey in 1913.

For the services Francisco Moreno provided as commissioner during the border disputes, the Argentine state granted him extensive land titles in Patagonia. Moreno in turn gave back to Argentina a large area close to the Nahuel Huapi Lake under the condition, that this land should be protected as a national park. When this national park was established by decree in 1922, Frey became its first superintendent, Emilio Frey, engineer and geographer of the Dirección General de Tierras, was commissioned by the decree to draw up a provisional regulation for the national park. At the same time, he worked out the surveying aspects of the demarcation of the National Park, which was now considerably enlarged compared to the original donation. He elaborated a park-regulation that prohibited the felling of wood in the state lands, the killing of wild animals, and it regulated slash-and-burn and defined emergency measures in case of forest fires. To this end, the park was divided into seven zones, each of which was assigned responsible park rangers.

Frey was also essential in elaborating the guidelines for the establishment of the National Park System in 1934, in cooperation with the director of the commission for national parks, Exequiel Bustillo. Frey kept this role after the park was renamed Nahuel Huapi National Park and integrated in the national park system.

Frey was cofounder of the Club Andino Bariloche, the first mountaineering club in Argentina, in 1931. He became its first president and continued in this role for 30 years.

== Honors ==
- A mountain refuge in the Nahuel Huapi National Park was named Refugio Emilio Frey after him.
- Lago Frey carries his name.
