= Bailey Willis =

American geologist (1857–1949)

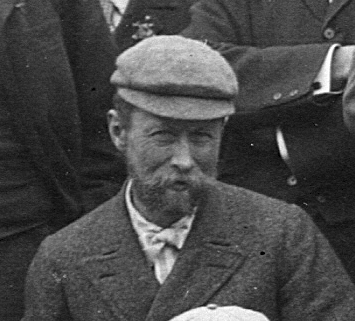
- Willis in 1897
- Born: March 31, 1857; New York
- Died: February 19, 1949 (aged 91); Palo Alto, California
- Education: Columbia University
- Awards: Penrose Medal (1944)
- Scientific career
- Fields: Geology Seismology
- Workplaces: United States Geological Survey Stanford University

Bailey Willis (March 31, 1857 in Idle Wild-on-Hudson, New York, United States – February 19, 1949 in Palo Alto, California) was a geological engineer who worked for the United States Geological Survey (USGS), and lectured at two prominent American universities. He also played a key role in getting Mount Rainier designated as a national park in 1899. After later focusing more on seismology, he became one of the world's leading earthquake experts of his time. He was also a prominent opposer of the continental drift theory.

== Early life and family ==
Bailey Willis was born March 31, 1857, the son of poet and publisher Nathaniel Parker Willis and Cornelia Grinnell Willis. His brother was Grinnell Willis. His father died when he was only ten years old. At the age of thirteen he was taken to England and Germany for four years of schooling, and thus acquired fluency in German at a time when many scientific texts were only available in that language. He entered Columbia University and in five years completed his studies with the degrees of mechanical (1878) and civil (1879) engineer.

Willis married his cousin, Altona Grinnell, in 1882, but she died in 1896. The couple had two children, Marion, who died in infancy, and Hope, later Mrs. Seward H. Rathbun. In 1898 he married Margaret Baker, daughter of Dr. Frank Baker of Georgetown University, who was also superintendent of the National Zoo in Washington, D.C. The children of his second marriage are Cornelius G. Willis, Robin Willis and Margaret (Mrs. Donald F.) Smith. The family lived for many years on the Stanford University campus. Margaret Willis died in 1941.

== Career ==
After receiving degrees in mining engineering and civil engineering, Willis worked from 1881 to 1884 as a survey geologist for Northern Pacific Railroad looking for sources of coal. Called the "boy boss" by work crews during his work looking for coal, he began studying the geology of Mount Rainier, the Cascade Range, and the Rocky Mountains. From 1884 to 1915, he worked for the USGS, being named director of the Appalachian division in 1889. In 1893 he published "The Mechanics of Appalachian Structure" in the Report of the United States Geological Survey. From 1895 to 1902 he lectured on geology at Johns Hopkins University. In 1900 he was appointed head of the Division of Areal Geology of the USGS. In 1903 he received a grant of $12,000 from the newly established Carnegie Institution of Washington to lead an expedition to northern China, an experience which was later described in his book Friendly China. He was elected to the American Philosophical Society in 1905.

From 1910 until 1914 he consulted for the government of Argentina an experience later recorded in his book A Yanqui in Patagonia. Willis also called for comprehensive state intervention in the enforcement of the national park at Lake Nahuel Huapí. He was commissioned by the Director General de Agricultura, Dr. Julio López Mañán, to prepare a study on the Nahuel Huapi National Park. This study first appeared in 1913 in a brochure published by the Dirección de Agricultura y Defensa Agrícola and was later reprinted in his book El Norte de la Patagonia under the title "Parque Nacional del Sud". Willis had probably discussed these ideas intensively with Moreno and also with Emilio Frey.

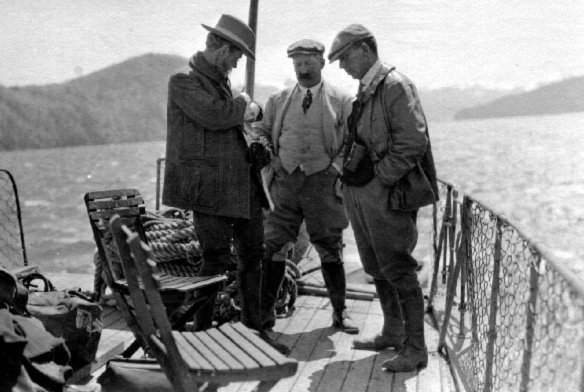
Left to right: Bailey Willis, Lugrubuel, and Emilio Frey, 1911

When he returned to the United States in 1915 he was named Head of the Stanford University Geology Department. He led a vigorous public campaign in the 1920s to raise awareness of earthquake hazards and safe building practices. It is claimed that many of California's early building codes were inspired by experiments performed by Willis on an "earthquake table" at Stanford University. Willis, concerned about the dangers of earthquakes convinced engineers to dig the foundation of the southern tower of the Golden Gate Bridge deeper. After finishing his work with the USGS, he was appointed as a professor and chairman of the geology department at Stanford University, where he served until 1922. In 1920, he was elected to the National Academy of the Sciences. He was president of the Seismological Society of America from 1921 to 1926, during which time he published his Geologic Structures. He was president of the Geological Society of America in 1928. On July 11, 1927, while in Cairo, Egypt, he heard that a destructive earthquake struck the Holy Land. The day after, he took a private flight from Cairo to Palestine, made observations of the impacted sites, and stayed there for several days to further investigate. A year later, he published his findings in the Bulitin of Seismological Society of America.

In 1928, he published "Continental Drift" in the SP 2: Theory of Continental Drift, by the American Association of Petroleum Geologists, where he rejects the theory. Stating "After considering the theory of continental drift with avowed impartiality, the author concludes by means of geophysical, geological and paleontologic reasoning that it should be rejected, because the original suggestion of the idea sprang from a similarity of form (coast lines of Africa and South America) which in itself constitutes no demonstration, because such a drift would have destroyed the similarity by faulting, and because other contradictions destroy the necessary consequences of the hypothesis." In 1932, he published "Isthmian Links" in the Bulletin of the Geological Society of America.

I confess that my reason refuses to consider "continental drift" possible.... When conclusive negative evidence regarding any hypothesis is available, that hypothesis should, in my judgment, be placed in the discard, since further discussion of it merely incumbers the literature and befogs the mind of fellow students .... Thus the theory of continental drift is a fairy tale, ein Märchen. It is a fascinating fancy which has captured imaginations.

— Continental drift, ein Märchen, American Journal of Science 242.9 (1944): 509-513.

== Honors ==
Among the numerous honors which came to Willis during his long life were an honorary Ph.D. degree from the University of Berlin and the Gold Medal of the Société de Géographie of France in 1910, the Legion of Honor, Belgium, in 1936, and in 1944 he was awarded the Penrose Medal by the Geological Society of America. From 1921 to 1927 he was President of the Seismological Society.

The Willis Wall on the north face of Mount Rainier is named for him, and Choconsaurus baileywillisi is also named for him.
