= Bertram Dickson =

Scottish airman

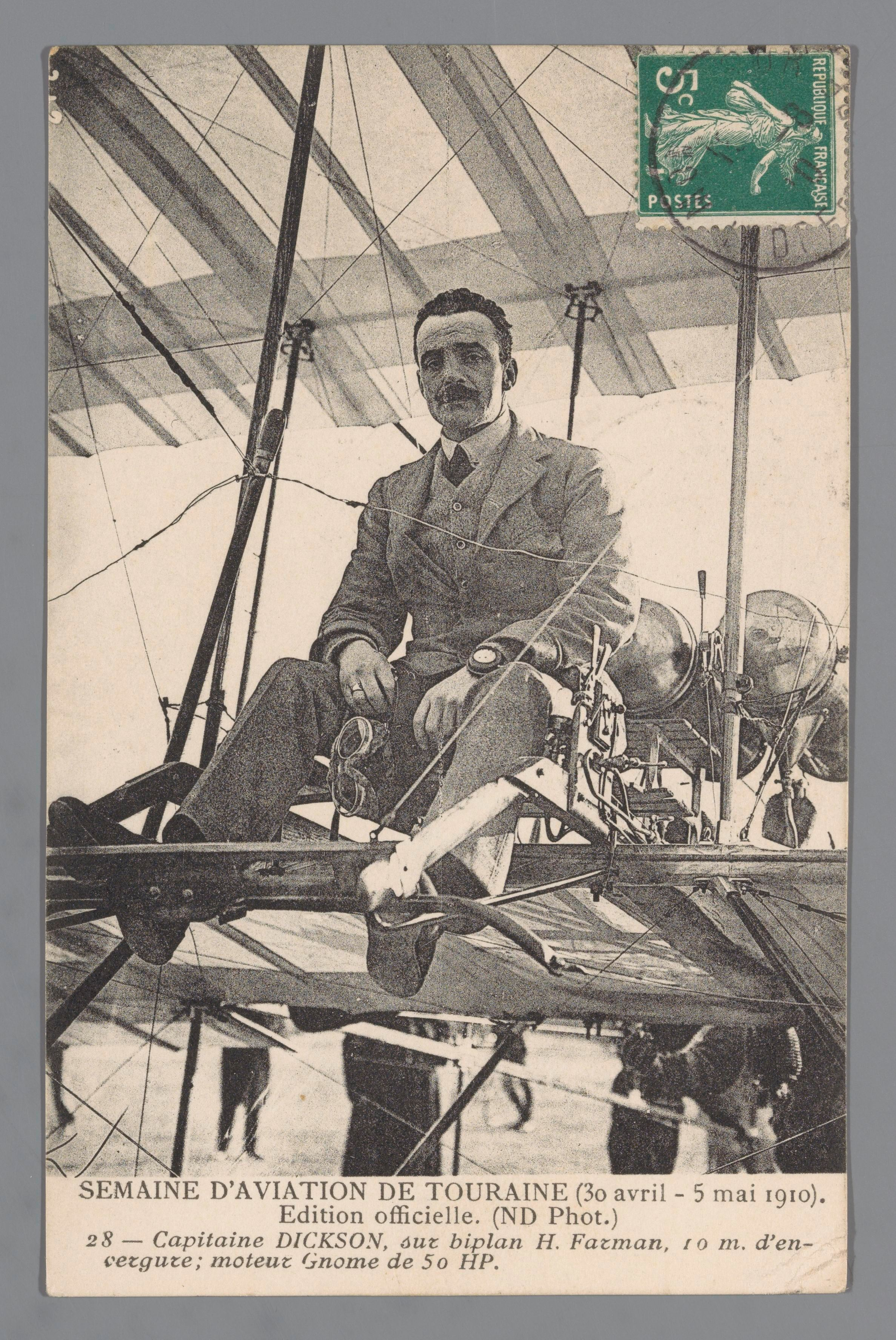
Bertram Dickson on Farman aircraft

Captain Bertram Dickson FRGS RHA (21 December 1873 – 28 September 1913) was a pioneer Scottish airman and the first British serviceman to qualify as a pilot. His exploits in the air, watched by Winston Churchill and Lord Kitchener, indirectly led to the creation of the Royal Flying Corps. Bertram Dickson was born in Edinburgh, Scotland on 21 December 1873. In 1892 Dickson accompanied the geographer Sir Thomas Holdich to the Andes Mountains to define the border between Chile and Argentina in the 1902 Arbitral award. After officer training at the Royal Military Academy, Woolwich, Dickson was commissioned as a second lieutenant in the Royal Artillery in November 1894. He was promoted to lieutenant in November 1897 and in November 1900 he was promoted to captain.

The following May, Dickson was seconded for service with the Foreign Office. By 1908, Dickson was in the Ottoman Armenian city of Van serving as the military attaché and vice-consul. In 1910 he published his Journeys in Kurdistan about his travels in Kurdistan during that period in which he described the region and the culture of the Kurds.

At the beginning of 1910, he enrolled at the Farman flying school at Mourmelon, and gained Aero-Club de France license no. 81 on 12 April. Dickson took part in the Lanark flying meet in August 1910, where he won the £400 prize for the greatest aggregate distance flown.

In September 1910, Dickson flew one of the two Bristol Boxkites that took part in the British army manoeuvres on Salisbury plain: his aircraft was captured by the opposing team when he landed to report the result of his reconnaissance by telephone.

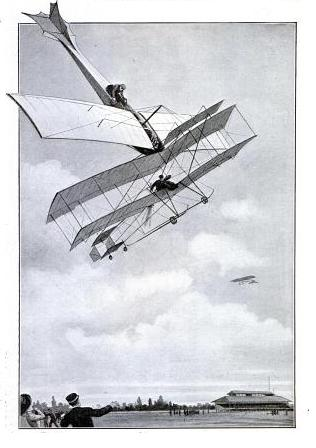
Artist's impression of the collision

On 1 October 1910, while in Milan, Dickson was involved in the first mid-air collision between two aeroplanes. An Antoinette monoplane, piloted by René Thomas of France, rammed Dickson's Farman biplane. Both pilots were injured in the crash. Although Dickson survived, he never fully recovered from his injuries, which contributed to his early death on 28 September 1913. His body was buried in the Highland village of Achanalt in Ross and Cromarty.
