= Cordón de las Vírgenes =

Mountain range in Argentina

- Location within Chubut

Highest point
- Coordinates: 43°44′31″S 71°32′50″W

Geography
- Location: Río Engaño Provincial Reserve, Languiñeo Department, Chubut Province, Argentina
- Parent range: Andes

The Cordón de las Vírgenes is a mountain range located in the Río Engaño Provincial Reserve, Languiñeo Department, Chubut Province, Argentina. Until 1966, it was claimed by Chile as part of the international boundary. The Picacho de la Virgen, Cerro Central, and Cóndor are part of the range. It lies southeast of Serrano Pass, south of Cerro Herrero, and east of the binational Cordón de los Morros.

The range was named by the Chilean Boundary Commission in 1955, along with Picacho de la Virgen; prior to this, no such names existed. The nearby homonymous hill was named by Lange during the preparation of his 1902 map. To the west of the range lie Norte Valley and Horquetas Valley.

== History ==
The Cordón de las Vírgenes in the context of the Alto Palena–Encuentro River dispute.

The Cordón de las Vírgenes was one of the disputed areas during the boundary conflict between Argentina and Chile in the Encuentro River and Alto Palena region. The area had been settled by Chileans since 1906. On 26 July 1952, the Argentine National Gendarmerie occupied disputed areas in Hondo Valley, Horquetas Valley, and the Lagunas del Engaño, notifying settlers that they had one month to regularize their status with the Argentine state. This prompted a diplomatic protest from Chile. On 4 August, Argentine gendarmes returned to the area.

In June 1964, the Argentine gendarmerie built facilities in Horquetas Valley and began erecting fences there, as well as in Hondo Valley, both west of the range. In 1965, the gendarmerie's presence in the valley—considered Chilean territory by Chile—generated diplomatic tensions. Argentine authorities again notified settlers to regularize their status with the Argentine state, prompting a formal protest from Chile.

On two occasions, Argentine gendarmerie fired machine guns at Chilean Carabineros, and once or twice at Chilean journalists from *Vea* magazine in July 1964, with no injuries.

After several incidents, the conflict was submitted to international arbitration. The 1966 arbitral award, delivered by Queen Elizabeth II, assigned the Cordón de las Vírgenes to Argentina, along with other areas such as Norte Valley, Horquetas, Hondo, and the Engaño River region. This award placed these areas under Argentine sovereignty, while the more fertile California Valley was recognized as Chilean territory.

== See also ==
- Alto Palena–Encuentro River dispute
