= Alto Palena–Encuentro River dispute =

Territorial dispute between Chile and Argentina

Map showing the territorial dispute and its resolution in 1966.

The Alto Palena-Encuentro River border dispute was a territorial dispute between the Argentine Republic and the Republic of Chile over the demarcation of the boundary between landmarks XVI and XVII of their common border in the valleys located north of General Vintter/Palena Lake (formerly General Paz Lake), and was resolved on November 24, 1966, by the arbitral ruling of Queen Elizabeth II of the United Kingdom.

The ruling divided the disputed territory between the two countries, distributing it between the Palena commune in the Palena Province, Los Lagos Region in Chile (Regions created afterwards), and the Languiñeo Department in the Chubut Province of Argentina.

== Background ==
From the beginning of their independent lives, the two countries sought to define their borders according to the principle of uti possidetis from 1810. Thus, Article 39 of the Treaty of Peace, Friendship, Commerce, and Navigation that came into force in April 1856 stipulated:

Both contracting parties recognize as boundaries of their respective territories the ones they possessed as such at the time of separating from Spanish dominion in 1810 and agree to defer any issues that may have arisen or may arise on this matter to be discussed later in a peaceful and friendly manner (...)

— Art. XXXIX, Treaty of Peace, Friendship, Commerce, and Navigation, 1856.

In compliance with Article 39 of the 1856 Treaty, the two countries signed the Treaty of Limits of 1881. Article 1 of this treaty states:

The boundary between Chile and the Argentine Republic, from north to south, up to the parallel fifty-two degrees of latitude, will be the Andes mountain range. The border line will follow in this section the highest peaks of said mountain range that divide the waters and pass between the slopes that detach to either side (...)

It was agreed that in the mountainous valleys where the divisory line of waters was unclear, the differences would be resolved amicably by two experts, one appointed by each side, and if they could not reach an agreement, a third expert would be appointed by both governments.

On August 20, 1888, an agreement was signed to demarcate the boundaries in accordance with the 1881 treaty, with experts Diego Barros Arana from Chile and Octavio Pico Burgess from Argentina being appointed. In 1892, Barros Arana presented his thesis, arguing that the 1881 Treaty had set the boundary along the continental divortium aquarum, which was rejected by the Argentine expert.

Due to differences in several points of the boundary where the experts could not agree, the demarcation was suspended until the Protocol of Limits of 1893 was signed, which in Article 1 states:

Consequently, the Republic of Argentina will have, in perpetuity, absolute ownership and dominion over all lands and waters, namely: lakes, ponds, rivers, and parts of rivers, streams, springs located east of the line of the highest peaks of the Andes mountain range that divide the waters, and Chile will have absolute ownership and dominion over all lands and waters, namely: lakes, ponds, rivers, and parts of rivers, streams, springs, located west of the highest peaks of the Andes mountain range that divide the waters (...)

El Alto Palena on the General Map of the region traversed by the Palena River exploration expedition, January–March 1894.

On January 4, 1887, the town of Palena was founded by Chilean settlers. In 1889, Carlos María Moyano and Pedro Ezcurra explored the Palena Valley on behalf of the Argentine government. That same year, the Argentine government subdivided and sold lands in Alto Palena to English settlers in London, lands that Chile considered part of its national territory. In early 1894, Hans Steffen, commissioned by the Chilean government, explored the Palena, Carrenleufú and Corcovado (Argentina) rivers, naming the Encuentro River.

In January 1894, the Chilean expert declared that he understood the main chain of the Andes to be the continuous line of peaks dividing the waters that form the separation of the Atlantic and Pacific watersheds. The Argentine expert responded that they did not have the authority to define what "main chain of the Andes" meant since they were merely demarcators.

As the experts Barros Arana and Francisco Pascasio Moreno (Pico's replacement) could not agree, it was decided in 1898 to invoke Article VI, paragraph 2, of the 1881 Treaty and request an arbitral ruling from Queen Victoria of the United Kingdom, who appointed three British judges.

The Argentine government argued that the boundary should essentially be an orographic boundary along the highest peaks of the Andes mountain range, while the Chilean government maintained that the boundary should follow the continental divide of waters. The tribunal considered that the language of the 1881 treaty and the 1893 protocol was ambiguous and susceptible to multiple interpretations, with the two positions being irreconcilable.

On May 20, 1902, King Edward VII issued the ruling that divided the disputed territories into four sections within the limits defined by the extreme claims on both sides and appointed a British official to demarcate each section in the summer of 1903. Regarding the Encuentro River area, the ruling stated: "From the fixed point in the Río Palena, the boundary will follow the Encuentro River, to the peak called Virgen, and from there to the line we have set in the General Paz Lake (...)."

The report of the Arbitral Tribunal dated November 19, 1902, details the delineation of the border in the sector:

Crossing the Palena at this point, opposite the confluence of the Encuentro River, it will then follow the course of the latter and its western branch to its source on the western slopes of Cerro de la Virgen. Ascending this peak, it will then follow the local water divide southwards to the north bank of General Paz (...)

In 1903, British demarcation officer Captain Bertram Dickson placed landmarks XVI and XVII at the confluence of the Palena and Encuentro rivers and on the shores of Lake General Paz, respectively, facing some difficulty locating the Encuentro River discovered in 1894 by Hans Steffen, due to the lack of knowledge of the area. Accessibility issues prevented him from placing a marker on Cerro de la Virgen mentioned in the award. Both countries maintained doubts about the location of the Encuentro River and which mountain was Cerro de la Virgen.

== Beginning of the dispute ==
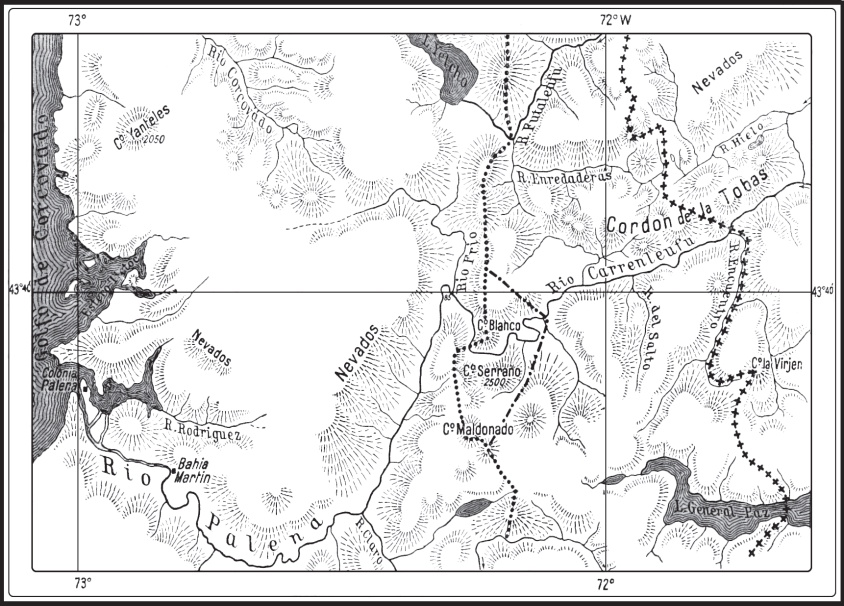
Map showing the boundaries established on the Palena River by the Chilean-Argentine Boundary Commission, accused by Hans Steffen of lacking accurate topographical information, specifically regarding the Encuentro River. The cartography was also questioned in the 1940s.

In the map drawn in 1901 by the Argentinian engineer Gunnar Lange during the 1902 arbitration award, he mistook the El Salto River for the Encuentro River (named in the 1902 award), placing the origin of the latter at the Cerro de la Virgen, which Lange had named in his map. However, this river actually originates from the Picacho de la Virgen, which was named after the homonymous hill at a later date, a key factor in the dispute. Gunner's work was used in the arbitration map. The Picacho de la Virgen (still unnamed at the time) was identified by the British demarcator Bertram Dickson as the source of the Encuentro River in 1903, describing it as located farther east than the boundary marker (hito) 17 placed during the demarcation.

As the intersection point of the border line with the Palena, the Arbitral Tribunal defined a place "in front of the confluence with the Río Encuentro", a southern tributary of the Palena that Hans Steffen had named so because at its confluence the meeting between two detachments of the Chilean expedition to the Palena occurred on February 6, 1894. According to the official account of Bertram Dickson, on March 2, 1903, they left the Steinkamp camp and descended to the supposed Río Encuentro, where they met with the Argentine engineer Eimar Soot. Initially, they identified a small stream as the Río Encuentro, and both Soot and the Chilean representative Barrios agreed to erect the border pyramid there, despite it not appearing on the available maps. A week later, upon receiving additional maps, Dickson discovered the error and returned on March 13 with the Argentine engineer Emil Frey, finding a larger river several miles to the west.

Barrios and Dickson agreed that this second river was the true Río Encuentro, but Frey disagreed, suggesting another river further east. After a failed exploration, Frey accepted the second site on March 15. Steffen criticizes that neither the arbitral commissioner, nor the heads of the Argentine and Chilean commissions knew the topography and nomenclature of the region, despite the maps presented to the tribunal and his own Memoria general on the Chilean expedition to the Palena providing sufficient data to identify the river correctly. The doubt about whether the final site chosen by Dickson corresponded to Steffen's original Río Encuentro persisted until the 1966 award. In 1941, the cartography that had served as the basis for demarcation by the Chilean-Argentine Boundary Commission was accused of suffering from serious errors, which led to tensions during the 1950s between both countries.

The valleys of California, Hondo, and Horquetas began to be populated by Chilean settlers in 1906.

In 1907, the Argentine government sent engineer Luis A. Álvarez to conduct a geographical survey of the Encuentro River, reporting that it should be another river located about 15 km to the west.

From 1911, Chilean settlers began establishing themselves in the disputed area.

On December 9, 1913, the Argentine government officially informed Chile that it considered landmark XVI to be incorrectly placed, as it was impossible for the border to reach Cerro de la Virgen from there following the instructions of the 1902 arbitral award. The Chilean government rejected the claims regarding landmark XVI in a note dated December 26 and, on June 17, 1914, closed the discussion on the matter, arguing that the 1902 ruling was immutable.

In November 1914, both governments signed a document with the coordinates of the border landmarks, maintaining those of landmark XVI.

On April 16, 1941, the Chilean-Argentine Mixed Boundary Commission was created to restore deteriorated landmarks and place new ones where necessary.

Between 1945 and 1947, the Chilean government granted property titles to settlers in the disputed area.

Landmark XVI had been lost, so when an attempt was made to locate it in 1948, the Chilean commissioner informed his government about the difficulties in geographically pinpointing it according to the 1902 arbitral award.

On July 26, 1952, a detachment of the Argentine National Gendarmerie, under the command of assistant officer Domingo Cianis del Río, occupied the disputed areas of Hondo Valley, Horquetas Valley, and Lagunas del Engaño, notifying settlers that they had one month to regularize their situation with the Argentine government. This prompted a diplomatic protest from Chile. On 4 August 1955, Argentine gendarmes returned to the area. Chilean senator Exequiel González Madariaga raised an interpellation on the matter on 13 September.

On 11 October 1952, the new Chilean commissioner, Lieutenant Colonel Eduardo Saavedra Rojas, presented his conviction that the Cerro de la Virgen mentioned in the 1902 award was, in his opinion, the mountain then known as Cerro Central in the Cordillera de las Vírgenes (referring to the Picacho de la Virgen, source of the Encuentro River). According to the local watershed divide toward Lake General Paz/Palena, this interpretation would grant Chile the disputed zone and reflected errors in the cartography of the area. The boundary line proposed by Saavedra left the Lagunas del Engaño in Argentine territory. However, in December 1955 the Chilean–Argentine Mixed Boundary Commission ratified that the Cerro de la Virgen was the one previously identified, noting that it was different from the Picacho. In October of the following year, due to popular pressure, Chile resumed its position regarding the mountain that forms the source of the river, and on 24 January 1957 the Argentine government demanded the legal validity of what had been expressed in 1955 by the Mixed Commission.

The Chilean members of the mixed commission, in addition to Saavedra, were Colonel Raúl Figueroa Martínez, Octavio Flores Castlli, and General Daniel Urra Fuentes. On the Argentine side were General Otto Helbling, president of the commission, and the delegates Samuel Dvoskin and Major Gonzalo Gómez.

Daniel Urra was criticized and called a "traitor to the fatherland" and "sold to Argentine gold" for having supported the Argentine thesis before Saavedra’s presentation.

On May 2, 1956, Chilean settlers in California Valley, Alto Palena, were notified by Argentine authorities in Esquel that they had to apply for Argentine property titles. The Carabineros de Chile instructed the settlers to disregard the order and notified the commander of the Gendarmerie in Esquel that Carabineros would prevent any actions violating the status quo agreed upon by the two countries.

On 3 November 1958, Argentine gendarmes again entered the disputed area, surrounding Hondo and Horquetas Valleys, blocking Chilean settlers from accessing the wintering grounds at the Engaño Lakes.

== Attempts to resolve the dispute ==
Following the Snipe islet incident in the Beagle Channel, the governments of Argentina and Chile sought approaches to resolve border issues. On February 2, 1959, Argentine President Arturo Frondizi landed at Los Cerrillos Airport and signed a declaration with his Chilean counterpart, Jorge Alessandri, known as the Declaration of Los Cerrillos, in which both leaders committed to "immediately entering into negotiations aimed at finding suitable arbitration formulas to resolve existing disputes."

On March 22, 1960, Frondizi and Alessandri signed the Joint Declaration on Arbitration in Santiago, Chile. The two presidents agreed to submit the border dispute in the Encuentro River and Palena-California valleys to the arbitration of Queen Elizabeth II of the United Kingdom (or, failing that, the President of Switzerland), while the Beagle dispute would be submitted to the International Court of Justice in The Hague.

On June 12, 1960, the Argentine Foreign Minister and the Chilean Ambassador in Buenos Aires signed agreements known as the Pacts of 1960:

- a) Arbitration of the dispute in the Encuentro River region before the Queen of the United Kingdom.
- b) Arbitration of the International Court of Justice on the issue of Nueva, Picton, and other islands.
- c) Recognition of Isla Lennox and its adjacent islets as Chilean territory.
- d) Division of the Beagle Channel by the median line, with "necessary adjustments to ensure that both countries have navigable waters along the entire divided portion."
- e) Additional Protocol to the April 16, 1941 agreement on the review, restoration, and densification of landmarks, subjecting any landmark disputes to arbitration by the Swiss Confederation. If Switzerland was unable to arbitrate, the President of the United States would act as arbitrator upon prior consultation with both parties (Art. 7).
- f) Navigation agreement without pilots for the innocent passage of Argentine warships through Fuegian channels between the Beagle Channel and the Strait of Magellan or via the Murray Channel between the Beagle Channel and the Drake Passage.

In September 1963, Argentine Gendarmerie personnel installed a fence in Valle Hondo, east of Cerro de la Virgen, in an area known as Río Encuentro by Argentines and Palena by Chileans. This act triggered diplomatic protests from the Alessandri government, which accused Argentina of pursuing an expansionist policy. Although Argentine authorities argued that the fence was located within their territory, President Arturo Illia (1963–1966) decided to remove it as a gesture of goodwill toward his Chilean counterpart. According to Mario Valenzuela Lafourcade, Illia's willingness to resolve the conflict was influenced by a spirit of cooperation and neighborliness that he shared with Alessandri, which facilitated overcoming the tension caused by this incident. In October of that year, Chilean settlers tore down a sign that read "National Gendarmerie, Valle Hondo Post".

This text generated suspicions on both sides of the Andes. Argentine authorities disagreed with the renunciation of Lennox and preferred to seek a bilateral solution rather than arbitration. The Chilean Senate rejected the navigation agreement. Due to a lack of support for the pacts in both nations, Chilean President Eduardo Frei Montalva withdrew them from discussion in the Congress in 1965.

In 1964, the Argentine Gendarmerie built facilities in Horquetas Valley and began erecting fences there and in Hondo Valley. This led to a protest note from the Chilean government.

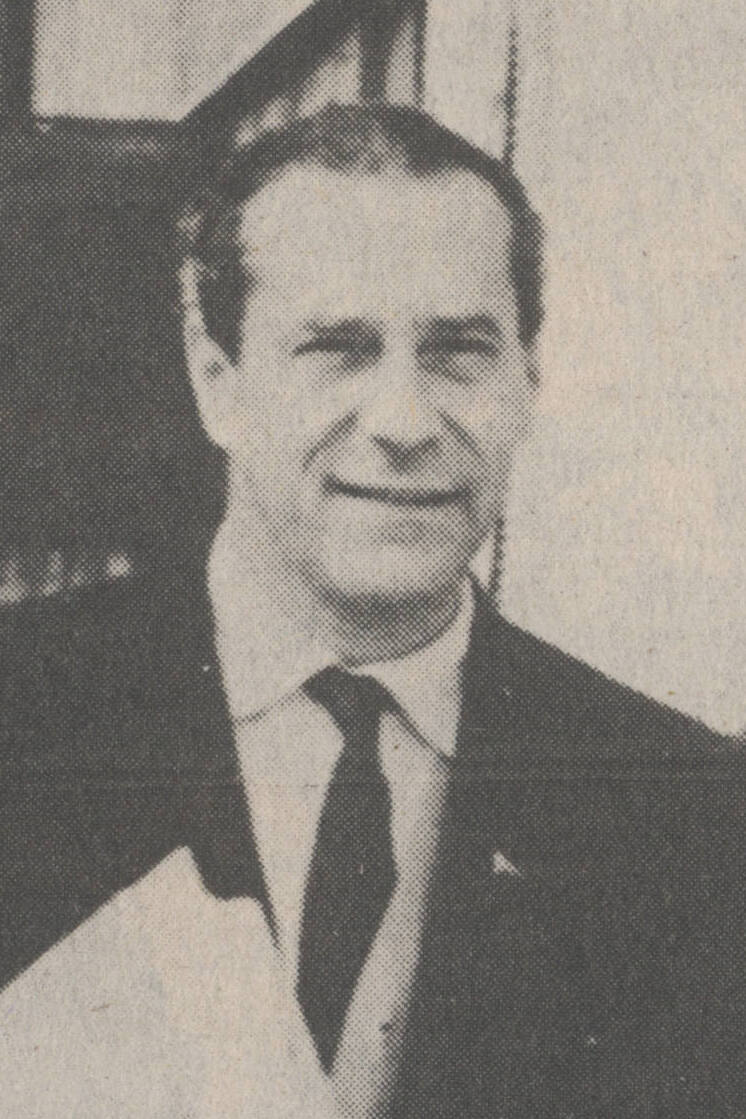
Gabriel Valdés Subercaseaux, Chilean Foreign Minister.

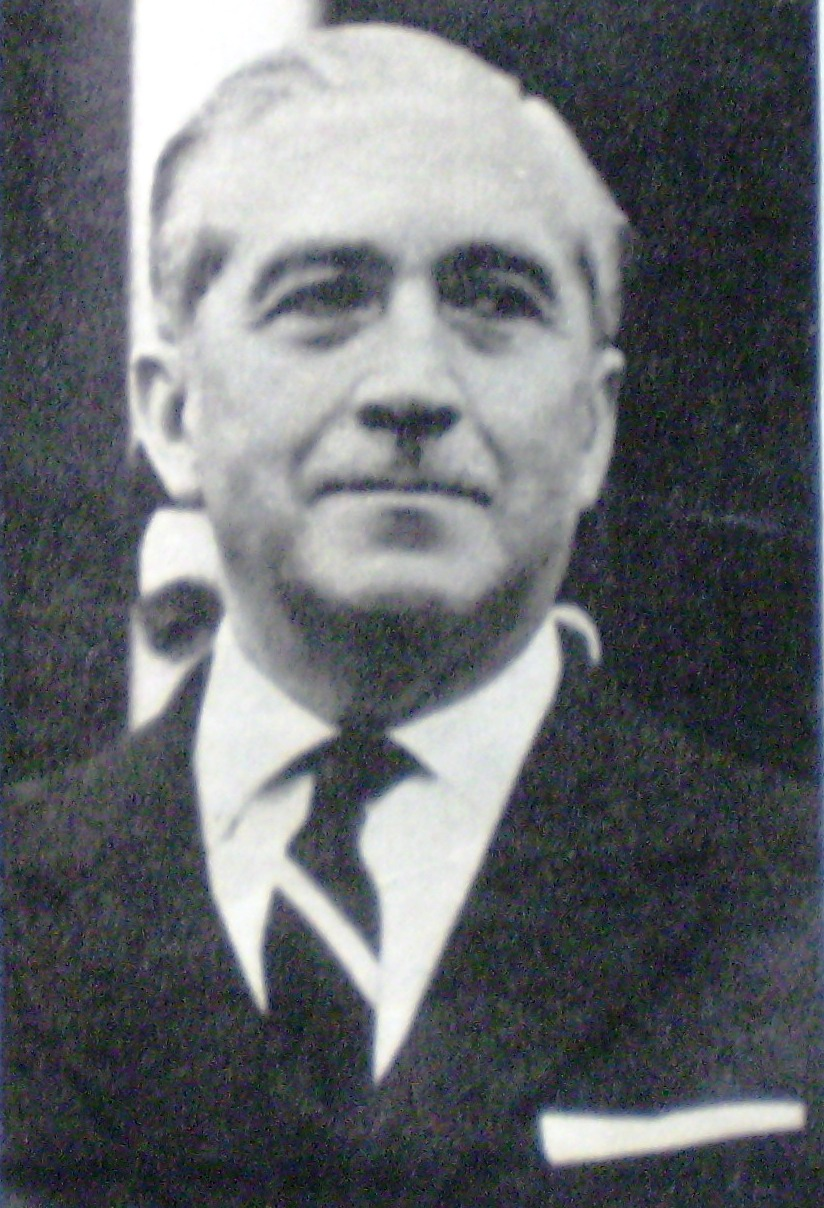
Miguel Ángel Zavala Ortiz, Argentine Foreign Minister.

Despite rejecting the pact, the idea of arbitration materialized. In 1964, both governments agreed to submit the boundary dispute to the Court of The Hague. The following year, both leaders participated in a summit in Mendoza, Argentina, seeking a definitive solution regarding borders. However, progress was hampered by heightened nationalism (mainly from the Armed Forces of both countries), repeated violations of boundary agreements by ships in the Beagle coastlines, the Laguna del Desierto conflict, the overthrow of Arturo Umberto Illia in 1966, and the pending resolution of the Palena arbitration.

On September 15, 1964, the Chilean government invited the British government to intervene as an arbitrator in the dispute.

On October 30, 1964, Chile attempted to reach an agreement to escalate the dispute to the International Court of Justice in The Hague, but Argentina disagreed. On November 6, 1964, following the inauguration of a new government in Chile, Foreign Ministers Gabriel Valdés Subercaseaux (Chile) and Miguel Ángel Zavala Ortiz (Argentina) issued a Joint Declaration committing to submit the dispute to the British Queen, attempting to resolve the issue "in accordance with the provisions of the 1902 General Arbitration Treaty, while preserving the positions taken by both parties on this matter." It also considered the possibility of a direct agreement between the two countries to resolve the dispute.

== Violent incidents ==
In the California Valley, Alto Palena, occupied by Argentine gendarmes since the 1950s, a serious incident nearly occurred in 1965 due to the tense atmosphere prevailing in the region. A group of gendarmes, led by an Argentine second lieutenant, attempted to assault an unarmed Chilean settler, prompting Chilean Foreign Minister Gabriel Valdés to file a formal protest. The Chilean press launched a campaign to cancel President Eduardo Frei Montalva's visit to Argentina, which aimed to advance pending border delimitation tasks between the two countries.

The Argentine response took several days to arrive. Eventually, Foreign Minister Zavala Ortiz made a brief visit to Santiago and stated he was unaware of the events in the California Valley. However, upon being informed of the incident details, President Illia ordered the removal of the Argentine second lieutenant responsible for the patrol.

This gesture was deemed satisfactory by the Chilean government, allowing the plans for the presidential visit to resume. President Frei Montalva arrived in Mendoza on October 30, where he was cordially received, giving the impression that recent conflicts had been left behind. During the meeting, the leaders agreed to conclude the activities of the joint commission within five years and signed a commitment to submit the Beagle Channel conflict to international arbitration, although this agreement was not implemented in practice.

In addition, on two occasions, the Argentine Gendarmerie fired machine guns at Chilean Carabineros in Horquetas Valley, as well as in July 1964, when two Chilean journalists from the magazine Vea were shot at (but not injured) by Argentine gendarmes.

== 1966 Arbitral Award ==
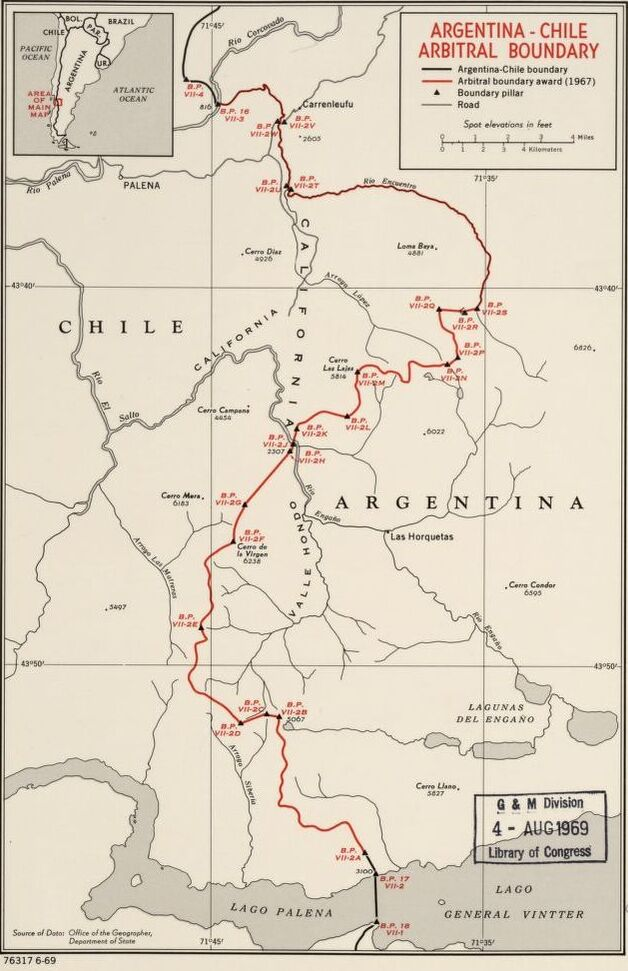
Border defined in the 1966 Arbitral Award.

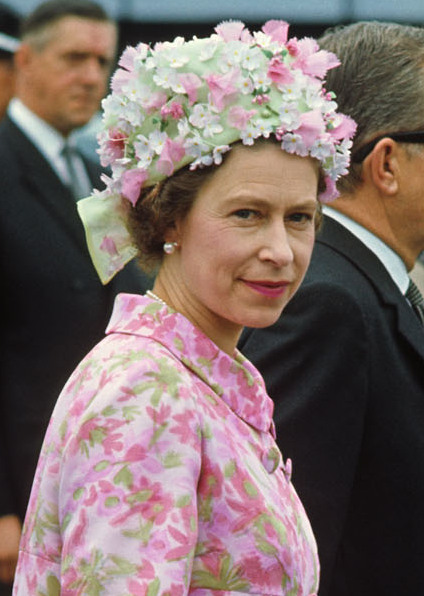
Elizabeth II of the United Kingdom signed the arbitration award on behalf of the British government, the formal arbitrator in the dispute. She had no involvement in the drafting of the award.

On November 25, 1964, the Argentine government formally requested Queen Elizabeth II to arbitrate the case, with the Arbitration Agreement signed on April 1, 1965, in London.

The Queen appointed the arbitrators: Lord McNair (as president), L.P. Kirwan, and Brigadier K.M. Papworth. A mission sent by the Tribunal examined the disputed area between December 1965 and January 1966.

The parties presented their arguments between September 19 and October 21, 1966.

Argentina's submission argued that the demarcators' confusion in 1902 did not nullify the 1902 award and that the boundary between markers XVI and XVII remained undefined. From marker XVI to the confluence of the Encuentro River with the False Engaño River, it followed the course of the Encuentro River to its sources at Portezuela de las Raíces, as established in the 1902 award or alternatively as unanimously agreed by the Argentine-Chilean Joint Commission in 1955.

Chile's submission maindtained that the boundary followed the Encuentro River to its sources on the western slopes of the Pico de la Virgen, located in the De las Vírgenes Mountain Range (Cerro Central).

The arbitral award was issued on December 9, 1966:

From marker 16 on the northern bank of the Palena River, the boundary shall cross the Palena to the mouth of the Encuentro River. It shall then follow the thalweg of the Encuentro to Point A at Confluence. The boundary shall then take the eastern branch and follow the thalweg of the Encuentro for nearly 16 kilometers to Point B. The line shall then take the western branch and ascend through a small lake to the local watershed divide at Point C. It shall then turn south and follow the local watershed divide for nearly 2 kilometers to Point D. The boundary shall then turn west and follow the local watershed divide for nearly 6 kilometers to Point E on the hills sometimes known as the Cordon de los Morros. It shall turn south and follow the local watershed divide to Point G on a hilltop just east of the Engaño River. The boundary shall proceed by a straight line to Point H on a low hill west of the Engaño River and then by a straight line to Point I on the watershed divide north of Cerro de la Virgen. Taking its southern branch, it shall follow the local watershed divide to Point J on Cerro de la Virgen. The boundary shall then follow the local watershed divide south to the northern shore of Lake General Paz at marker 17.

The demarcation on the ground was to be carried out during the summer of 1966–1967 starting no later than January 7, 1967. About 420 km^{2} of fertile lands in dispute were awarded to Argentina, including the Norte and Hondo Valleys, the rich region of the Engaño River and Engaño Lagoon, as well as perpetuating the occupation of the Horquetas Valley by the Argentine Gendarmerie. Meanwhile, the California Valley, the most fertile of the disputed land, was awarded to Chile.

Following this award, Chilean Foreign Minister Gabriel Valdés declared that "the award fully confirms Chilean sovereignty over the California Valley, which had long been settled by Chile, in a correct interpretation of the 1902 award." He added that the ruling rejected the decision made in 1955 by the Joint Boundary Commission on the course of the Encuentro River and accepted the Chilean argument that the river originates in the Cordón de las Vírgenes. It assigned Argentina the more mountainous, unpopulated region located south of the disputed zone."

== See also ==
- 1977 Beagle Channel arbitration
- Laguna del Desierto incident
- Southern Patagonian Ice Field dispute
- Puna de Atacama dispute
- Beagle conflict
- 1902 Arbitral award of the Andes between Argentina and Chile
- East Patagonia, Tierra del Fuego and Strait of Magellan dispute
- Dispute over the extended continental shelf in the Southern Sea between Argentina and Chile
- Argentina-Chile relations
