= Miguel Ángel Zavala Ortiz =

Argentinian lawyer and diplomat

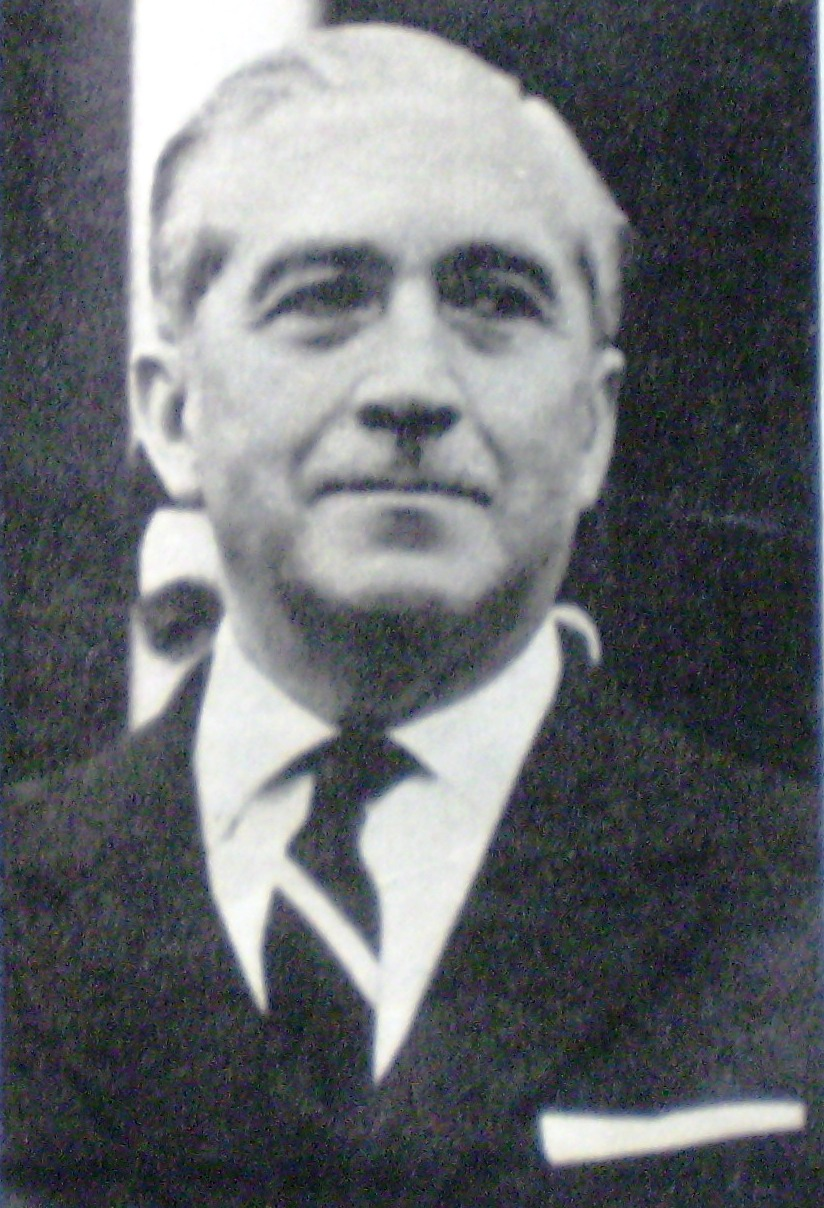
Miguel Ángel Zavala Ortiz

Miguel Ángel Zavala Ortiz (24 December 1905 – 20 May 1982) was an Argentinian lawyer and diplomat. He was Minister of Foreign Affairs during the presidency of Arturo Umberto Illia between 1963 and 1966 and is remembered for the efforts to reach the United Nations General Assembly Resolution 2065, considered a goal in the Argentina's claim of Falkland Islands.

He was born in San Luis and entered in politics as a law student into the Socialist Party, although his father was a known radical leader. He graduated at Law in the University of Buenos Aires.

In 1932 he joined the Radical Civic Union, at the same time he publicly denounced the "patriotic fraud" perpetrated during the presidency of Agustín P. Justo. Between 1948 and 1952 he was elected National Deputy. He was key figure in the support of the coup d'état against Juan Domingo Perón.

During his tenure as Minister of Foreign Affairs the Alto Palena–Encuentro River dispute was solved under the 1966 arbitration award in which Queen Elizabeth II mediated. Also the killing of Hernán Merino in the Laguna del Desierto incident happen in 1965.
