= Jaramillo, Chubut =

Jaramillo
- municipality and village
- Location within Chubut Province
- Coordinates: 43°50′36″S 071°14′29″W
- Country: Argentina
- Province: Chubut Province
- Department: Languiñeo Department
- Elevation: 879 m (2,884 ft)
- Time zone: UTC−3 (ART)

Jaramillo is a village and municipality in the Languiñeo Department of Chubut Province in southern Argentina. It is located on the right bank of the Palena River just below Lake Vintter.
