= Martínez de Rozas Range =

Mountain range in Chile and Argentina

Cordón Martínez de Rozas
- Cordón del Bosque; Cordón Oriente
- Location within Aysén

Highest point
- Coordinates: 48°57′33″S 72°47′05″W

Geography
- Location: Southern Patagonia
- Countries: Argentina; Chile
- Parent range: Andes

The Cordón Martínez de Rozas, also known as Cordón del Bosque or Cordón Oriente, is a mountain range in southern Patagonia. Its northern section currently forms the border between Chile and Argentina, while the remainder lies within the Lago del Desierto Provincial Reserve in Santa Cruz Province, Argentina.

The range extends approximately 35 km in a northeast–southwest direction, with its northern end at the southern shore of Lake O'Higgins/San Martín and its southern end at a rocky spur descending into the middle valley of the De las Vueltas River.

Martínez de Rozas also serves as the local continental divide, separating the Andean Pacific drainage from the sierras and pampas to the east.

== History and toponymy ==
=== Toponymy ===
The name honors Juan Martínez de Rozas, a leader in the Chilean War of Independence.

=== Dispute over possession ===
Map showing the territorial dispute between the two countries (the cordón is highlighted in red).

The 1903 map of the British demarcator, Herbert Leland Crosthwait, draw a line between cornerstone 62 and Mount Fitz Roy without putting the cerro Gorra Blanca in the border as the 1901 Argentinian Gunnar Lange's map does. Chile saw this as the border being in the Martínez de Rozas Range.

In 1921, Chilean settler Vicente Ovando Vargas arrived and established residence in the area. Disagreements over the boundary soon emerged, leading to conflicts between Chilean settlers and Argentine gendarmes.

The territory was part of the Laguna del Desierto dispute, and no consensus on the boundary existed until 1994, when an arbitral tribunal ruled in favor of Argentina, awarding it the majority of the cordón.

In Chile, the range was considered the eastern boundary of the territory surrounding Laguna del Desierto, whereas Argentina recognized only the northern section as the border.
