= Julio Alsogaray =

Julio Alsogaray may refer to:

- Julio Rodolfo Alsogaray (1918–1994), Argentine Army general
- Julio Alsogaray (sailor) (born 1980), Argentine sailor
