= Horquetas Valley, Argentina =

Valley in Chubut, Argentina

Horquetas Valley
- Valle de las Horquetas
- Location within Argentina

Geology
- Type: Valley

Geography
- Country: Argentina
- State/Province: Chubut Province
- District: Languiñeo Department
- Population center: Carrenleufú
- Coordinates: 43.7755556°S 71.6438056°W

Location
- Interactive map of Horquetas Valley

The Valle de las Horquetas or Horquetas Valley is a valley located in the Languiñeo Department, Chubut Province, Argentina, near the border with Chile. The valley has been historically significant due to its proximity to the California Valley and was claimed by Chile until 1966 during the Alto Palena–Encuentro River dispute until 1966.

== History ==
Alto Palena–Encuentro River dispute.

The Valle de las Horquetas was one of the key areas in dispute during the border conflict between Argentina and Chile in the Encuentro River and Alto Palena region. The area was settled by Chileans since 1906. On 26 July 1952, the Argentine National Gendarmerie occupied disputed areas in Valle Hondo, Valle de las Horquetas, and Lagunas del Engaño, notifying settlers that they had one month to regularize their status with the Argentine state, prompting a diplomatic protest from Chile. On 4 August, Argentine gendarmes returned to the area.

In June 1964, the Argentine Gendarmerie built facilities in Valle de las Horquetas and began erecting fences there and in Valle Hondo. In 1965, the presence of the Gendarmerie in the valley, which Chile considered part of its territory, heightened diplomatic tensions. Argentine authorities again notified settlers to regularize their status with the Argentine state, prompting a formal protest from Chile.

On two occasions, the Argentine Gendarmerie fired machine guns at Chilean Carabineros.

Following several incidents, the conflict was submitted to international arbitration. The 1966 arbitral award, issued by Queen Elizabeth II of the United Kingdom, assigned Valle de las Horquetas to Argentina, along with other areas such as Valle Norte, Valle Hondo, and the Encuentro River region. The award granted Argentina sovereignty over these areas, while the California Valley, considered more fertile, was recognized as Chilean territory.

== Climate ==
The climate of Valle de las Horquetas is a cold continental climate, typical of the Patagonian region. Although specific climate data for the valley is not available, the surrounding area experiences low average annual temperatures, cold winters, and moderate precipitation, influenced by its proximity to the Andes mountain range.

== See also ==
- California Valley, Chile
- Alto Palena–Encuentro River dispute
- Del Desierto Lake
- Hondo Valley
- Snipe incident
