= Provincial Route 23 (Santa Cruz) =

Highway in Argentina

Provincial Route 23
- Ruta provincial 23
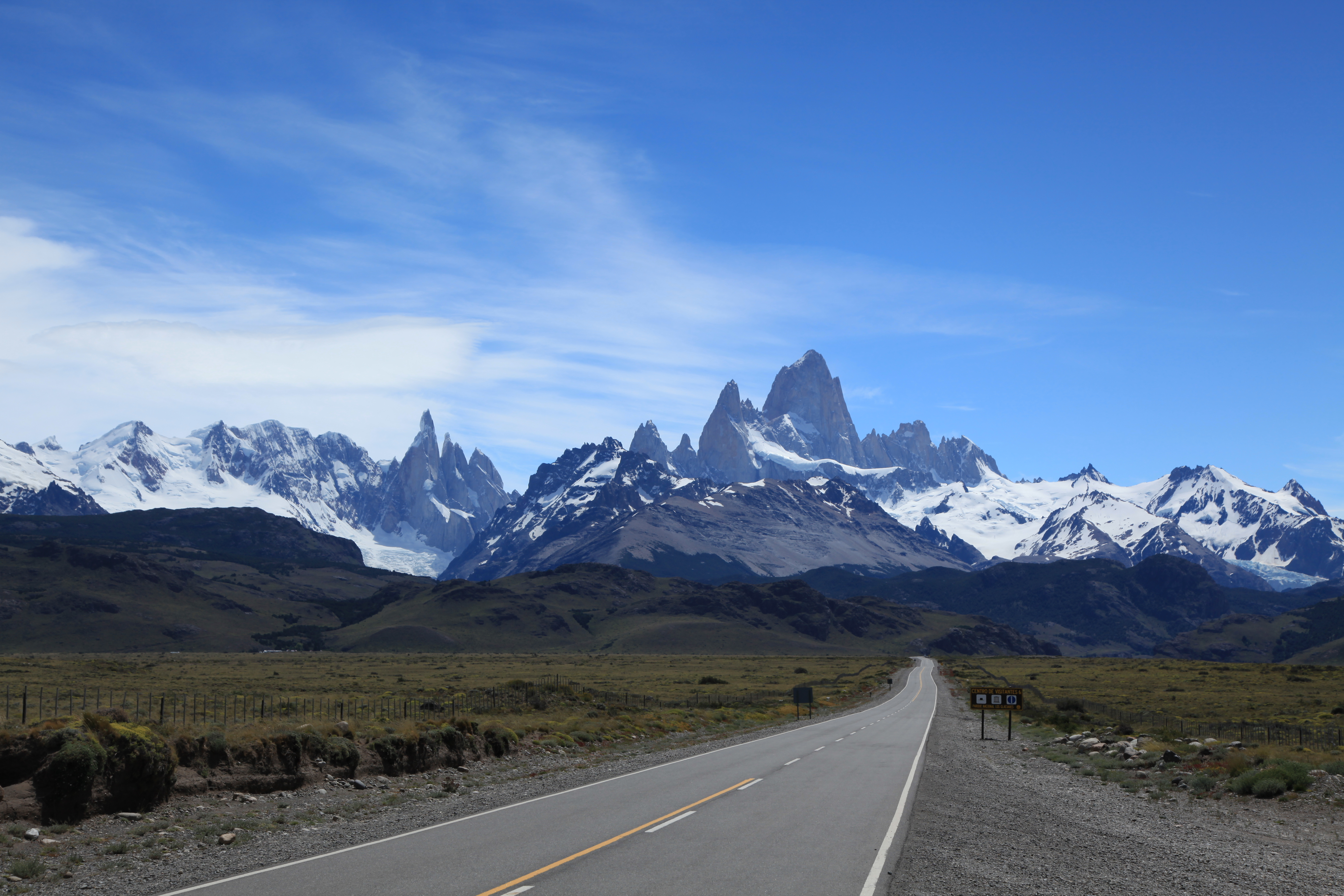

Route information
- Length: 124 km (77 mi)

Major junctions
- Southeast end: National Route 40
- Northwest end: Del Desierto Lake

Location
- Country: Argentina
- Provinces: Santa Cruz

Highway system
- Highways in Argentina

Provincial Route 23 (Spanish: Ruta Provincial 23), also known as RP23, is a highway that originates on National Route 40 in southwest Santa Cruz Province in Argentina. It has a length of 124 km (77 mi), of which 87 km (54 mi) is paved and 37 km (23 mi) is unpaved. RP23 starts at RN40 to the southeast and ends at Del Desierto Lake in the northwest.

RP23 borders the north shore of Viedma Lake, the only land access to El Chaltén. To access Del Desierto Lake, the route enters Los Glaciares National Park bordering Río de las Vueltas.
