= California Valley, Chile =

Valley in Los Lagos Region, Chile

California Valley
- Valle de California, Valle California
- Location within Chile

Geology
- Type: Glacial valley

Geography
- Location: Palena, Región de Los Lagos, Chile
- Country: Chile
- State/Province: Región de Los Lagos
- District: Palena
- Borders on: Argentina–Chile border
- Coordinates: 43.675833°S 71.6975°W
- River: Encuentro, El Salto

Location
- Interactive map of California Valley

The California Valley or Valle California is a Chilean valley located in the commune of Palena, in the Alto Palena area, Los Lagos Region, between boundary markers 16 and 17 of the Argentina–Chile border. The valley has had Chilean settlers since the beginning of the 20th century and was claimed by Argentina in the Alto Palena–Encuentro River dispute, even occupying part of the area in the 1950s, which ended in 1966 with an arbitral award.

== Climate ==
The climate is continental climate. The average temperature is 3 °C. The warmest month is February, with 12 °C, and the coldest is July, with −6 °C. The average annual precipitation is 3,085 millimetres. The wettest month is December, with 350 millimetres, and the driest is September, with 169 millimetres.

== History ==
Alto Palena–Encuentro River dispute.

On 2 May 1956, Chilean settlers in the California Valley, Alto Palena were notified by Argentine authorities from Esquel that they should request Argentine property titles. The Carabineros instructed the population to ignore the order and notified the commander of the Gendarmerie in Esquel that the Carabineros would prevent their actions, as it was a violation of the status quo agreed upon between the two countries.

On 3 November 1958, Argentine gendarmes again entered the disputed area.

On 22 March 1960, Frondizi and Alessandri signed in Santiago, Chile the Joint Declaration on Arbitration. The two presidents agreed to submit the boundary dispute in the Río Encuentro area and the valleys of Palena and California to arbitration by Queen Elizabeth II of Great Britain (or, failing that, the President of Switzerland), while the Beagle Channel dispute would be submitted to the International Court of Justice in The Hague.

In the California Valley, Alto Palena, occupied by Argentine gendarmes since 1958, a serious incident was almost witnessed in 1965 due to the tense atmosphere. A group of gendarmes, led by an Argentine sub-lieutenant, attempted to assault an unarmed Chilean settler, which led Foreign Minister Gabriel Valdés to lodge a formal protest. The Chilean press, in turn, began a campaign to cancel President Frei Montalva's visit to Argentina, whose purpose was precisely to advance the pending tasks of border demarcation between the two countries.

The response from Argentina took several days to arrive. Finally, Foreign Minister Zavala Ortiz visited Santiago briefly and claimed to be unaware of what had happened in the California Valley. However, upon being informed of the details of the incident, President Illia ordered the removal of the Argentine sub-lieutenant responsible for the patrol.

This gesture was considered satisfactory by the Chilean government, which allowed the presidential visit plans to resume. Frei Montalva arrived in Mendoza on 30 October, where he was received cordially, giving the impression that recent conflicts had been left behind. During the meeting, the leaders agreed to complete the activities of the joint commission within five years and signed a commitment to submit the Beagle Channel conflict to international arbitration, although this agreement was not implemented in practice.

Following the 1966 award, Chilean Foreign Minister Gabriel Valdés declared that "the Award fully confirms Chilean sovereignty over the California Valley, which has long been settled by Chile, in a correct understanding of the 1902 award." He added that the ruling rejects the decision made in 1955 by the Joint Boundary Commission regarding the course of the Encuentro River and accepts the Chilean thesis that the river originates in the Cordón de las Vírgenes. It assigns to Argentina the more mountainous, uninhabited region in the south of the disputed area."

The demarcation on the ground was to be carried out in the summer of 1966–1967 beginning no later than 7 January 1967. About 420 km² of fertile disputed land was awarded to Argentina, including the Norte and Hondo valleys, the rich Río Engaño region and Laguna del Engaño, as well as maintaining the occupation of the Horquetas Valley by the Argentine Gendarmerie. Meanwhile, the California Valley, the most fertile part of the disputed territory, was awarded to Chile.

== See also ==
- Horquetas Valley, Argentina
- Alto Palena–Encuentro River dispute
- Del Desierto Lake
- Hondo Valley
- Snipe incident
