= Hondo Valley, Argentina =

Valley in Chubut, Argentina

Hondo Valley
- Valle Hondo
- Location within Argentina

Geology
- Type: Valley

Geography
- Country: Argentina
- State/Province: Chubut Province
- District: Languiñeo Department
- Population center: Carrenleufú
- Coordinates: 43.81137°S 71.68371°W

Location
- Interactive map of Hondo Valley

Valle Hondo ('Hondo Valley') is a valley located in the Languiñeo Department, Chubut Province, Argentina, near the border with Chile. The valley lies southwest of the Horquetas Valley and southeast of the California Valley, close to the Engaño Lakes. It was claimed by Chile until 1966 during the Alto Palena–Encuentro River dispute.

== History ==
Alto Palena–Encuentro River dispute.

Hondo Valley was one of the key areas in the Alto Palena–Encuentro River dispute between Argentina and Chile. The area had been settled by Chileans since 1906.

In 1952, the Argentine National Gendarmerie occupied Valle Hondo, together with the Horquetas Valley and the Engaño Lakes, notifying Chilean settlers that they had one month to regularize their status with the Argentine state, which triggered a diplomatic protest from Chile.

In June 1964, the Gendarmerie built facilities in Hondo Valley and erected fences there as well as in the Horquetas Valley. In 1965, the presence of the Gendarmerie in the valley, which Chile considered part of its territory, heightened diplomatic tensions. Argentine authorities again notified settlers to regularize their status with the Argentine state, prompting a formal protest from Chile.

The conflict culminated in an international arbitration in 1966, resolved by Queen Elizabeth II of the United Kingdom. The arbitral award assigned Valle Hondo, along with the Horquetas Valley and the Engaño Lakes region, to Argentina, while the California Valley was awarded to Chile.

== Climate ==
The climate of Valle Hondo is a cold continental climate, typical of the Patagonian region. The average annual temperature is about 2 °C, with maximums of 12 °C in February and minimums of −6 °C in June. Annual precipitation reaches around 3,085 millimeters, with December being the wettest month (350 mm) and September the driest (169 mm).

Valle Hondo

Climate chart (precipitation, max. and min. temperature)
J	F	M	A	M	J	J	A	S	O	N	D
346 13 3	300 16 7	315 10 2	271 5 1	233 2 −3	206 −5 −6	188 −2 −7	185 −2 −8	169 2 −5	222 6 −3	299 9 0	350 12 2
- █ Average max. and min. temperatures in °C
- █ Precipitation totals in mm
Imperial conversion
J	F	M	A	M	J	J	A	S	O	N	D
14 55 37	12 61 45	12 50 36	11 41 34	9.2 36 27	8.1 23 21	7.4 28 19	7.3 28 18	6.7 36 23	8.7 43 27	12 48 32	14 54 36
- █ Average max. and min. temperatures in °F
- █ Precipitation totals in inches

== See also ==
- Horquetas Valley
- California Valley
- Alto Palena–Encuentro River dispute
- Del Desierto Lake
- Snipe incident
