= Vintter Lake =

Lake in Chile

Palena Lake General Vintter Lake
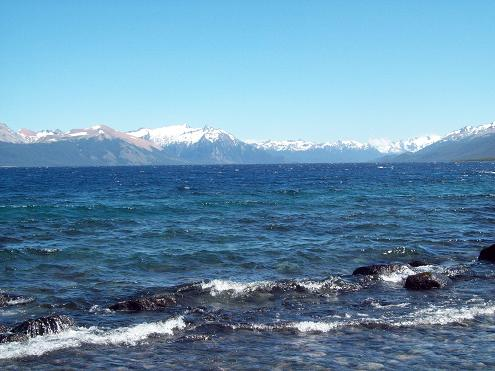

- Location within Argentina
- Location: Tehuelches Department / Languiñeo Department, Chubut Province, Argentina; Palena Commune, Palena Province, Los Lagos Region, Chile
- Coordinates: 43°56′S 71°35′W
- Type: glacial
- Primary outflows: Carrenleufú
- Basin countries: Argentina; Chile
- Max. length: 40 km (25 mi)
- Max. width: 8 km (5.0 mi)
- Surface area: 135 km^{2} (52 sq mi)
- Max. depth: 300 m (980 ft)
- Surface elevation: ~ 920 m (3,020 ft)
- Settlements: Lago Vintter (Argentina)

Vintter Lake or Palena Lake is a lake located in Patagonia which is shared by Argentina, where it is known as Lago General Vintter, and by Chile, where it's called Lago Palena. Both names are internationally accepted. The Argentine name is after General Lorenzo Vintter, the second governor of the Argentine Territory of Patagonia (1882–1884), and the first governor of the Territory of the Río Negro (1884–1888).

The Palena River originates at Vintter Lake, where it is locally called Carrenleufú (Greenriver), or in Spanish Rio Corcovado.

Vintter Lake is noted for its fly fishing for brook and rainbow trout, both non-native, introduced species.
