= Aldea Epulef =

Coordinates: 43°19′15″S 69°41′40″W

- Municipality and village
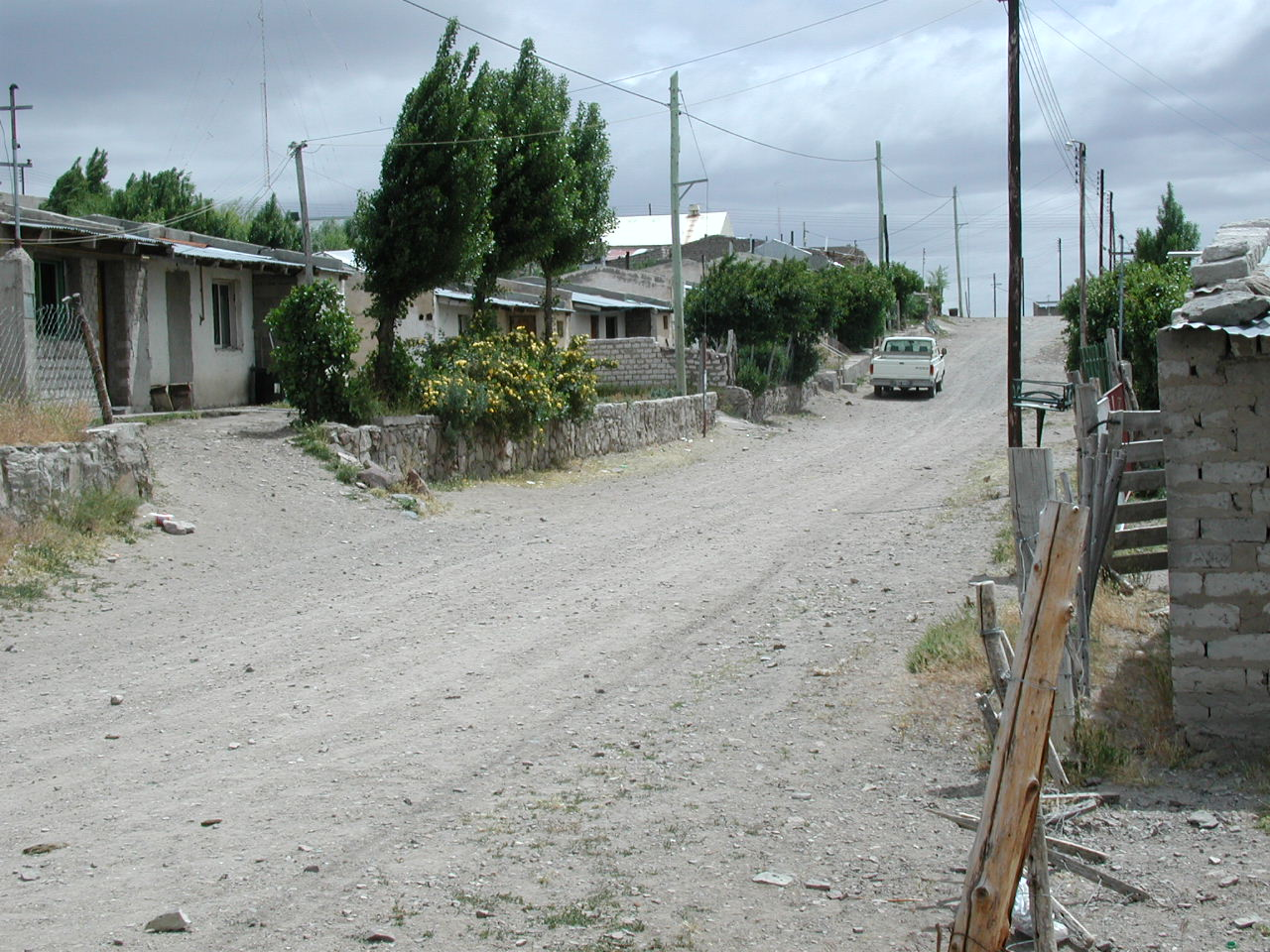
- Aldea Epulef Village
- Interactive map of Aldea Epulef
- Country: Argentina
- Province: Chubut Province
- Department: Languiñeo Department

Population (2011)
  - Total: 251
- Time zone: UTC−3 (ART)

Aldea Epulef is a village and municipality in the Languiñeo Department of Chubut Province in southern Argentina.The population of the municipality grew from 150, in the 2001 census, to 251 in the 2011 census.
