= Laguna del Desierto incident =

1965 border clash between Argentina and Chile

Coordinates: 49°08′50″S 72°56′02″W

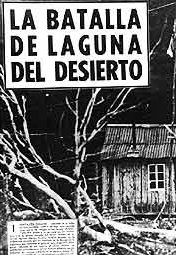
- Cover of the Argentine magazine Gente y la Actualidad. In the background, the shelter built by Chilean Carabineros
Date	6 November 1965
Location	Puesto Arbilla, to the south of Del Desierto Lake
Result	Status quo ante bellum

Belligerents
Argentina: Argentine Gendarmerie	Chile: Carabineros de Chile

Strength
12 Gendarmes	4 Carabineros

Casualties and losses
None	1 killed; 1 injured; 2 captured

The Laguna del Desierto incident occurred between four Chilean Carabineros and between 40 and 90 members of the Argentine National Gendarmerie and took place in an area south of O'Higgins/San Martín Lake on 6 November 1965, resulting in one lieutenant killed and a sergeant injured, both members of Carabineros, prompting a diplomatic crisis between Chile and Argentina.

== Historical background ==
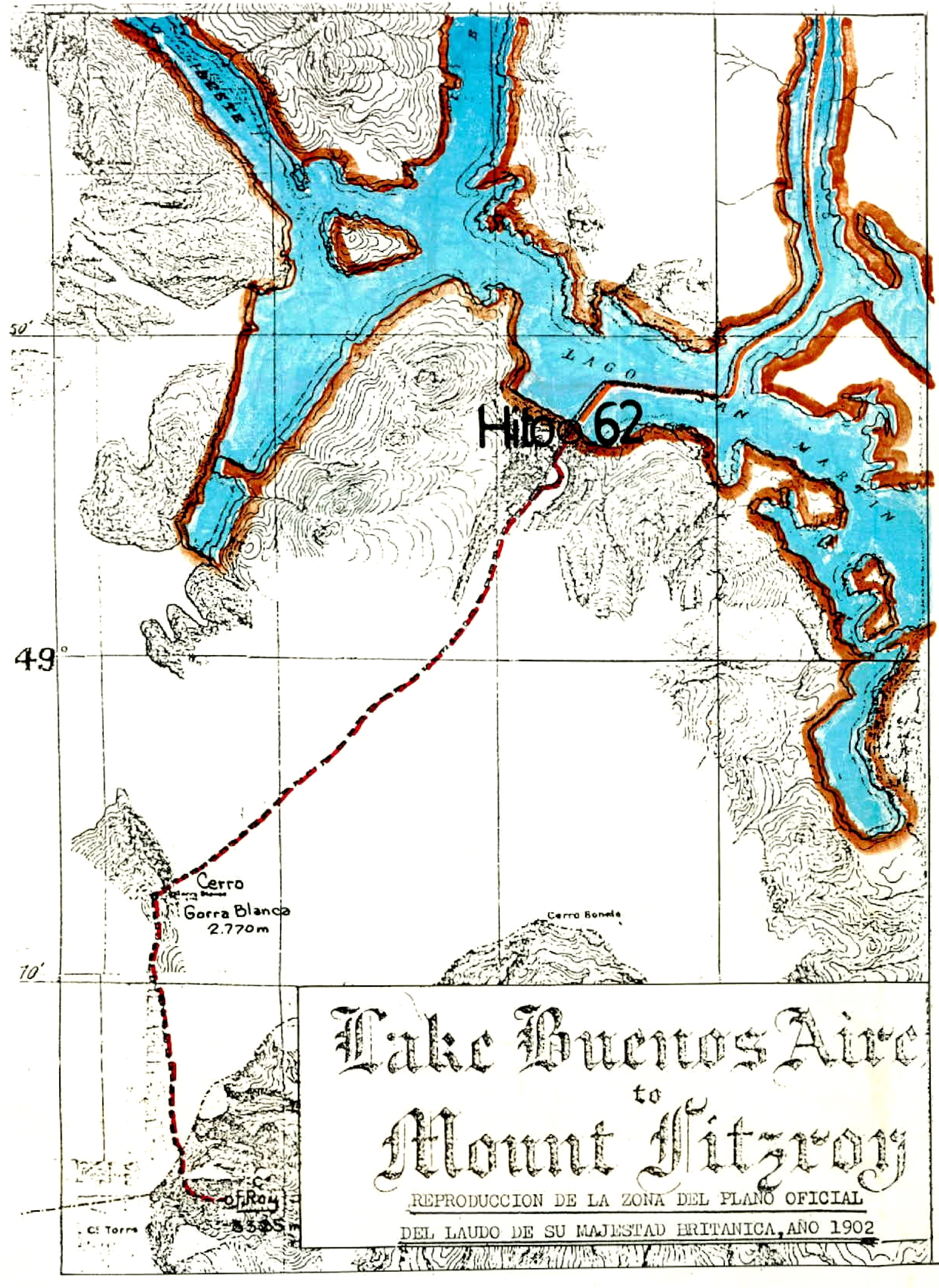
1902 referee map, originally made by the Argentinian engineer Gunnar Lange.

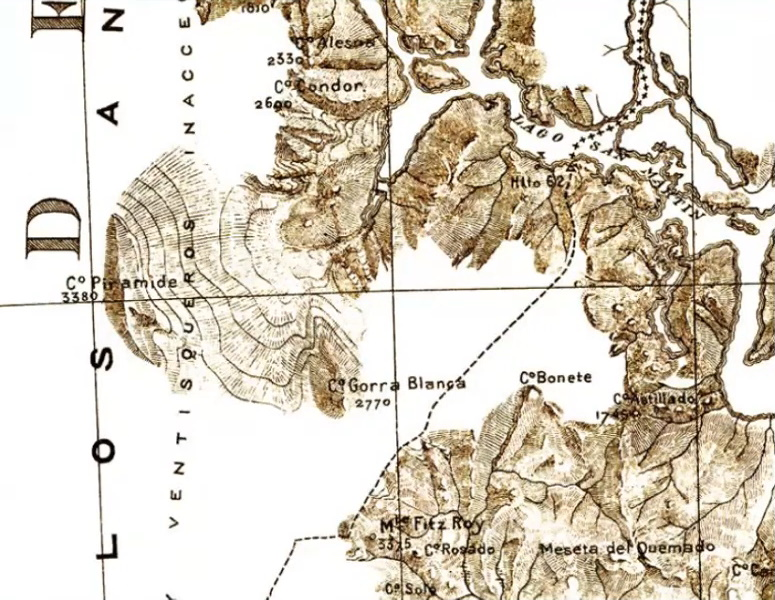
1903 Herbert Leland Crosthwait demarcator map

The British award of 1902 considered the demands of Chile and Argentina as irreconcilable and previous authorization of both governments draw a boundary between the extreme pretensions of the litigants. In the Laguna del Desierto region, the tribunal set the hito 62 (cornerstone 62) at the O'Higgins/San Martin Lake, put in place by Herbert Leland Crosthwait, and drew the boundary from there to mount Fitz Roy on the Martínez de Rozas Range awarding Chile the complete valley of Laguna del Desierto.

In 1946 an aerial reconnaissance of the United States Air Force, ordered by the Chilean government, revealed that the lake emptied to the Atlantic shores. Chile and Argentina had to redraw their maps.

=== Argentine internal situation ===
The initially organized labour support for 1963 elected Argentine President Arturo Illia turned to antagonism during 1964, as secret plans for Juan Domingo Perón's return from exile took shape. Accordingly, the General Confederation of Labor (CGT) leader José Alonso called a general strike in May, and became a vocal opponent of the president. This antagonism intensified after Perón's failed attempt to return in December, and during 1965, CGT leaders began publicly hinting at support for a coup.

The triumph of the Peronists party in the March 1965 elections shook the Argentine Armed Forces, both among internal military factions linked to the Peronist movement, and in particular among the large section of the army which remained strongly anti-Peronist. In addition, a campaign against the government was also being carried out by important parts of the media, notably Primera Plana and Confirmado, the nation's leading newsmagazines. Seizing on minimally relevant events such as the President's refusal to support Operation Power Pack (Lyndon Johnson's April 1965 invasion of the Dominican Republic), Illia was nicknamed "the turtle" in both editorials and caricatures, and his rule was vaguely referred to as "slow", "dim-witted" and "lacking energy and decision", encouraging the military to take power and weakening the government even more; Confirmado went further, publicly exhorting the public to support a coup and publishing a (non-scientific) opinion poll touting public support for the illegal measure.

== The incident ==
A map showing the territorial dispute between Chile and Argentina

On 4 October 1965, the Chilean settler Domingo Sepúlveda was instructed by Argentine gendarmes to regularize his settlement with the Argentine authorities in Río Gallegos, capital of Santa Cruz province. On 9 October Sepúlveda went to the Chilean Police station at the O'Higgins/San Martín Lake to denounce the Argentine requirement. On 17 October Carabineros sent a platoon to the zone and built an outpost in the property of Juana Sepúlveda and later a six-man reconnaissance patrol was sent to a shelter 8 km farther south. They were major Miguel Torres Fernández, lieutenant Hernán Merino Correa, sergeant Miguel Manríquez, the lance-corporal Víctor Meza Durán and the Carabineros Julio Soto Jiménez and José Villagrán Garrido.

On 30 October, Eduardo Frei Montalva and Arturo Illia, presidents of Chile and Argentina, met in Mendoza, Argentina and agreed to revert to the status quo before the Argentine requirement: withdraw the forces, no further buildings for Carabineros or Gendarmerie in the zone.

On the Argentine side, on 1 November the operation Laguna del Desierto under the command of Osiris Villegas and Julio Rodolfo Alsogaray, chief of the V Division of the Argentine Army and Director of the Argentine Gendarmerie respectively, brought in several DC-3 flights the Gendarmerie Squadron "Buenos Aires" from El Palomar Airport to the zone and later, on 3 November, the Gendarmerie Squadron 43 was ordered from Río Turbio to meet the "Buenos Aires" in the same area. They were accompanied by journalists and photographers of the magazine Gente y la Actualidad.

On 6 November at 14:00 Major Torres received the order to return to the police station. Two Carabineros, Soto and Villagrán, were ordered to bring the horses and the other four men prepared their return. At 16:40 they were surrounded by approximately 90 Argentine Gendarmes. As the Chileans noted the encirclement, they called to negotiate, Argentine forces shot dead Lieutenant Hernán Merino and injured Sergeant Miguel Manríquez.

Photographs published in Argentine magazine Gente y la Actualidad in 1965
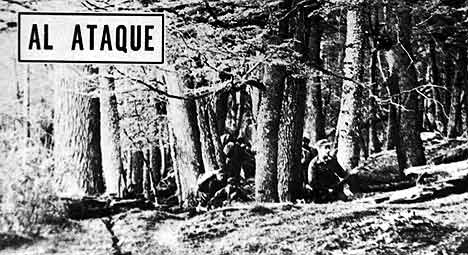
Argentine forces deployed into the area to establish secure and covert positions overlooking the killing zone

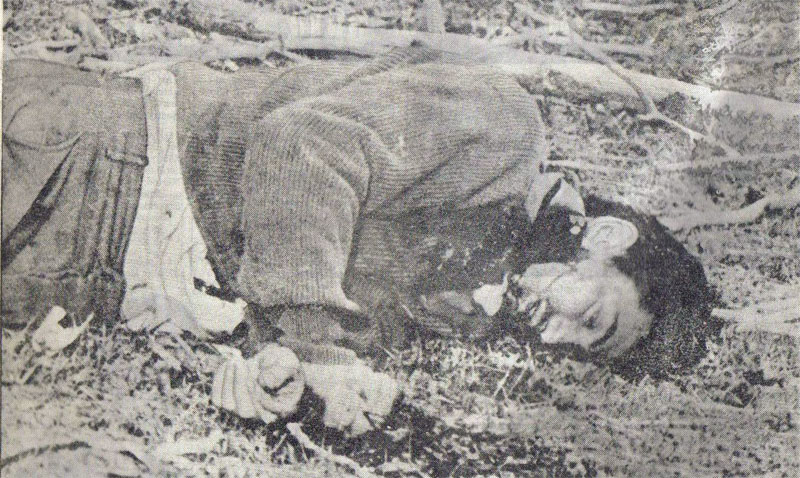
Lieutenant Hernán Merino Correa lies mortally wounded in the woods.

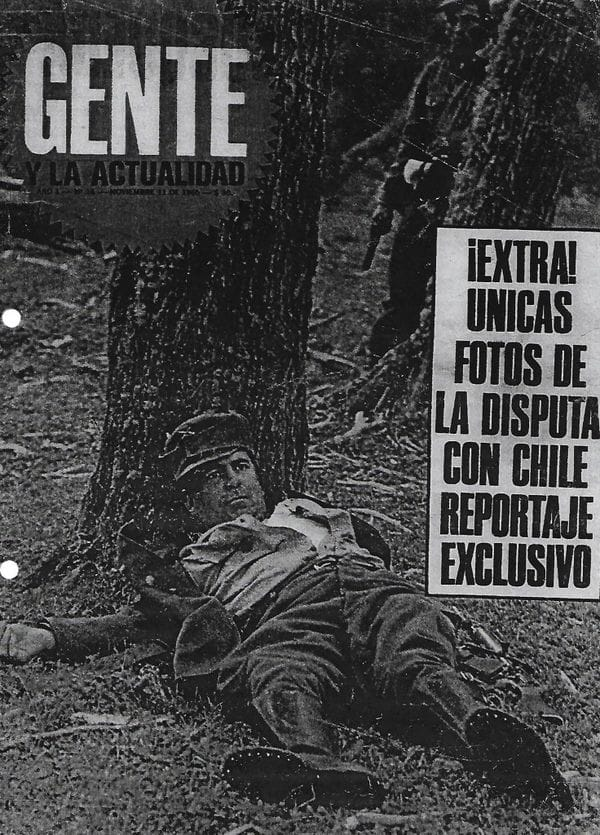
Sergeant Manríquez lies seriously injured. In the background, an Argentine gendarm with a handgun

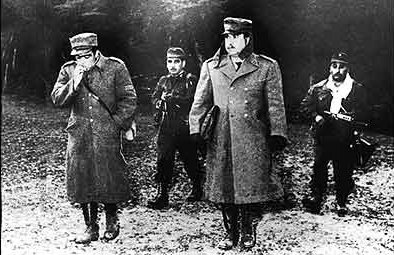
Chilean Mayor Miguel Torres (right) and Carabinero Víctor Meza Durán (left) in custody of the Argentine Gendarmerie

Major Torres, Manríquez and Meza were captured and brought, along with Merino's body, to the barracks of Regimiento No. 181 de Combate of the Argentine Army in Río Gallegos. On 9 November they were freed and flew to Chile with an envoy of Presidente Frei, Juan Hamilton (then sub-secretary in the Ministry of the Interior and Public Security).

The Chilean Ministry of Foreign Affairs, Gabriel Valdés, on 10 November 1965 called the killing of Merino "an unprecedented and unexcusable act in the history of our boundary disputes."

== Aftermath ==
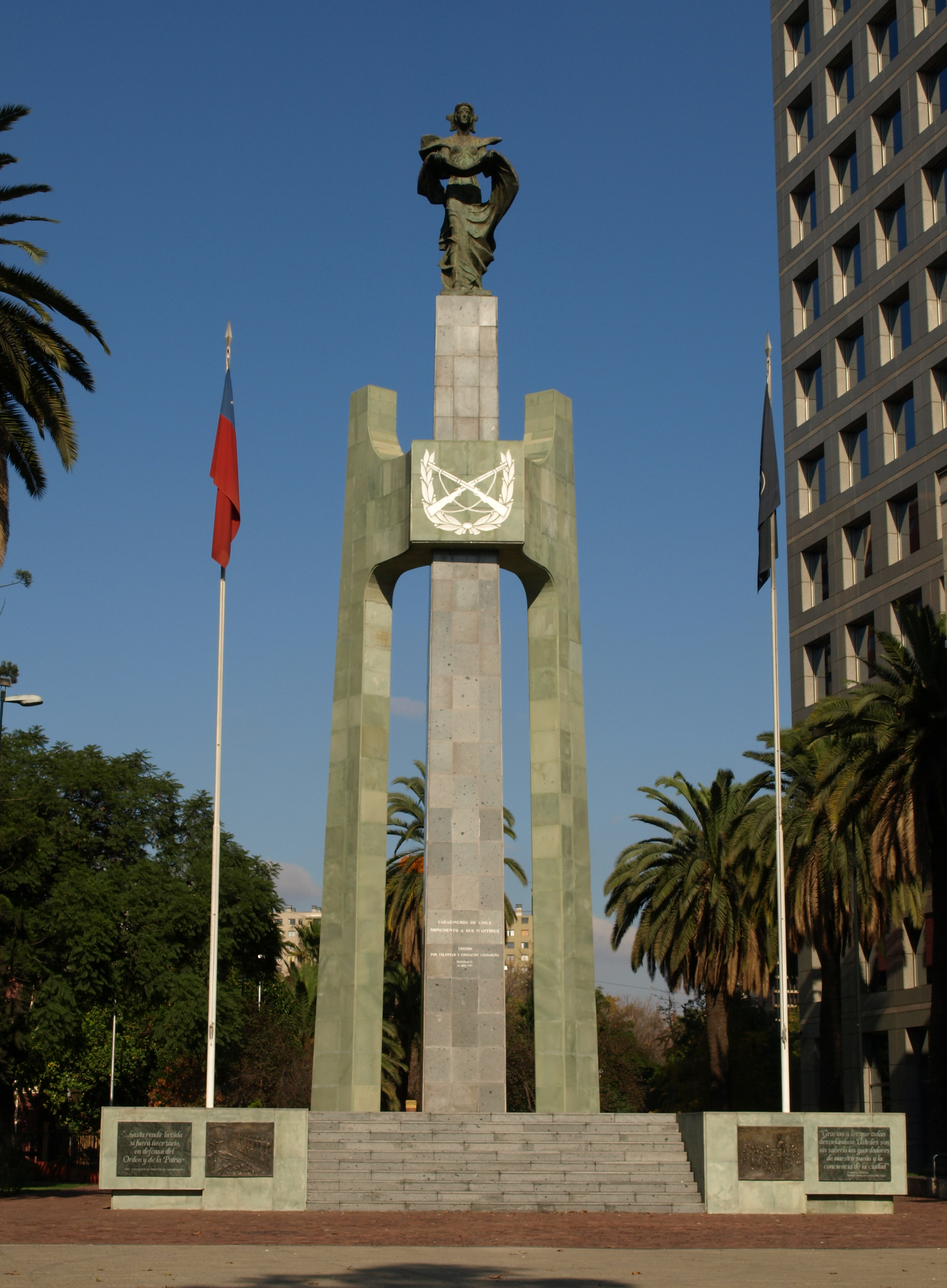
Monument to the Carabineros

In 1994, an international tribunal awarded almost the whole zone to Argentina. After a refused appeal in 1995, Chile accepted the award. Lieutenant Hernán Merino Correa became one of the best-known and emblematic Carabinero in Chile and the statements about him reveal that the image of the ideal Carabinero, one who embodies heroism, devotion to homeland and self-sacrifice, (even to the point of dying) has been successfully maintained. His body was brought to Santiago where he was accorded a state funeral and he was interred under the monument to the glories of Carabineros de Chile. The Escuela de Fronteras of Carabineros bears his name, as many other schools and streets in Chile.

Under the planning of the Commander of the First Division of the Army, General Julio Alsogaray, a military coup against Argentine president Illia took place on June 28, 1966. General Alsogaray presented himself in Illia's office that day, at 5:00 a.m., and 'invited' him to resign his post. Illia refused to do so at first, citing his role as Commander-in-Chief, but at 7:20, after seeing his office invaded by military officers and policemen with grenade launchers, he was forced step down. The next day, General Juan Carlos Onganía became the new Argentine President.

Both countries gave different accounts of the incident, each accusing the other of initiating the attack. Argentine sources denied the number of 90 members of Gendarmes. No official inquiry on the incident have been ever held by the Argentine government.

Michel Morris stated that Argentina had used threats and force to pursue its claims against Chile and Great Britain and that some of the hostile acts or armed incidents appear to have been caused by zealous local commanders. Gino Bianchetti Andrade thinks that the Argentine Gendarmerie made in this case a deliberated and planned use of violence in order to obtain control of the zone and political preponderance of the force.

== See also ==
- List of hostile incidents at the Argentine border
- Alto Palena–Encuentro River dispute
- Southern Patagonian Ice Field dispute
- Beagle conflict
- 1902 Arbitral award of the Andes between Argentina and Chile
- Argentina-Chile relations
- Laguna del Desierto § Dispute
