= Julio Rodolfo Alsogaray =

Argentine Army general

Julio Alsogaray
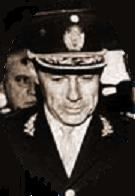
- General Julio Alsogaray
- Born: 1918; Esperanza, Santa Fe
- Died: 1994 (aged c76)
- Military career
- Allegiance: Argentina
- Branch: Argentine Army
- Rank: Lieutenant general
- Commands: 2nd Cavalry Division; 1st Army Corps; Commander in Chief of the Argentine Army

Julio Alsogaray (1918–1994) was an Argentine Army general.

== Biography ==
Julio Alsogaray was born in Esperanza, Santa Fe to Julia Elena Bosch and Álvaro Enrique Alsogaray, in 1918. Alsogaray's great-grandfather had a role as Admiral Guillermo Brown's adjutant in the 1845 Battle of Vuelta de Obligado, which established Argentine control over the lower Paraná River, and both his father and grandfather had been colonels in the Argentine Army. Alsogaray graduated from the National War College in 1937, and married the former Zulema Legorburo.

== Politics ==
Participating in General Benjamin Menéndez's failed, September 1951 coup attempt against President Juan Perón, Alsogaray was promoted to the rank of General following Perón's 1955 overthrow. He later served as Campo de Mayo training base Commandant, and Commander of the 2nd Cavalry Division. Alsogaray was named Under Secretary of the Army in 1962-63, and in 1964, Chief of Gendarmerie, in which capacity he captured the members of an incipient guerrilla group led by journalist Jorge Ricardo Masetti.

He was directly involved in the Laguna del Desierto incident.

Appointed Commander of the 1st Army Corps in January 1966, Alsogaray planned a coup d'état against the democratically elected President Arturo Illia; Illia was a moderate figure who had incurred opposition from conservative groups by refusing to annul Peronist victories in the 1965 mid-term elections (their exiled populist leader, Juan Perón, himself welcomed the prospect of a coup, and of a possible political deal).

Alsogaray supported the recently removed Chairman of the Joint Chiefs, General Juan Carlos Onganía, as Illia's successor; the two generals were allies and had been leading members of the moderate ("Blue") faction of the Argentine military during their dispute with the hard-line ("Red") faction that marred events in 1962 and 1963. Alsogaray managed military contacts with leading civilians amenable to a coup, and enjoyed the support of Onganía's replacement, General Pascual Pistarini, as well as the friendship of the Chief of Army Intelligence, General Mario Fonseca. Leading discussions on the structure of the future government, he put forth a blueprint prepared by his influential older brother, Álvaro Alsogaray, supporting the dissolution of democratic institutions, the enhancement of the judiciary as the guarantor of rights, and a more free market-oriented economic policy. A key proposal was the creation of the post of Prime Minister, who would be given wide purview over policy, and to which the Alsogaray brothers intended that Álvaro be appointed by Onganía.

The coup itself, which took place on the morning of June 28, 1966, was led militarily by Pistarini, who encountered little resistance. General Alsogaray, however, personally approached President Illia at his Casa Rosada office to deliver the order to resign, informing Illia that:

As a representative of the Armed Forces, I have come to request that you leave this office.

(Illia): You do not represent the Armed Forces, rather an insurrection. You and those with you are highwaymen who, like bandits, appear in the early morning hours.

I invite you to leave. Do not force me to use violence.

Of what violence do you speak? The violence is the one you've just unleashed. The nation shall always recriminate you for this usurpation.

Following the coup, Onganía, who had obtained Pistarini's pledge to leave himself and any other active-duty General out of the new government, nixed Álvaro Alsogaray's proposal for creating a (powerful) Prime Minister's post, denying him even the post of Minister of Economy of Argentina he had twice previously held. He did, however, name Julio Alsogaray, to whose planning he largely owed the coup's success, to succeed Pistarini as Chairman of the Joint Chiefs in December. Differences had developed by May 1968, however, between Alsogaray and the President, who resisted his input, and whose efforts to control the CGT labor union (by way of fostering a corporativist model) were anathema to Alsogaray's neoliberal ideology. Disputes also arose with the Internal Affairs Minister, Guillermo Borda (who opposed any return to democratic rule), and with Alsogaray's successor as head of the important Campo de Mayo base, Major General Cándido López (who favored an early call for elections). Fearing a coup, Onganía decided it was best to "refresh" the three forces' leadership every two years, and informed Alsogaray of his retirement on August 20; rather than wait until the scheduled, October 4 transition, he stepped down as Joint Chiefs Commander on August 26.

His replacement, the 3rd Army Corps Commander, General Alejandro Lanusse, himself removed Onganía in 1970. Amid a wave of political violence (Onganía removal was triggered by the execution of a former President, General Pedro Aramburu), a group belonging to the far-left ERP unsuccessfully attempted to kidnap Alsogaray on August 18, 1971. His own son, Juan Carlos, joined the Montoneros guerrilla organization, and took part in attacks on the Army in the hills of Tucumán Province as a commander during the mid-1970s. The younger Alsogaray was apprehended in February 1976 by counterinsurgency forces led by the Operativo Independencia Commander, General Antonio Domingo Bussi, and was executed.

== Last years ==
Alsogaray maintained a low profile in subsequent years. In early 1983 Alsogaray visited a dying Arturo Illia in a hospital in Córdoba to apologize for the coup d'état, which he had grown to regret throughout the years. Illia accepted his apology and died a few days afterwards. Alsogaray died over a decade later, in 1994.
