= Palena River =

Palena River Río Buta Palena Río Corcovado
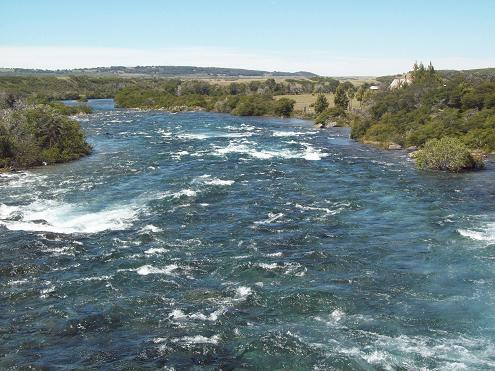
- Headwaters at Vintter Lake
- Native name: Carrenleufú (Mapudungun)

Location
- Countries: Argentina; Chile

Physical characteristics
- Source: Vintter Lake
  - location: Andes, Patagonia, Argentina
  - coordinates: 43°53′58″S 71°25′32″W
  - elevation: 927 m (3,041 ft)
- Mouth: Gulf of Corcovado
  - location: Pacific Ocean, Chile
  - coordinates: 43°46′04″S 72°58′33″W
  - elevation: 0 m (0 ft)
- Length: 240 km (150 mi)
- Basin size: 12,887 km^{2} (4,976 sq mi)
- Discharge
  - location: mouth
  - average: 130 m^{3}/s (4,600 cu ft/s)

Basin features
- Tributaries
  - left: Rosselot River; Rio Risopatrón
  - right: Rio Frio

The Palena River or Carrenleufú is a river shared by Chile and Argentina in Southern Lakes Region. It drains the waters of the Vintter Lake, also shared by these nations, and it flows into the Pacific Ocean. 56.5% of the river basin lies in Chile.

This river has a regular glacial regime and rapid white waters. The rapids between Palena and Puerto Raúl Marín Balmaceda are choice kayaking white water. The volume and rapid drop in elevation of the river is ideal for hydroelectric power plants. There are several projects at both sides of the border to use this power.

== Course ==
The river originates as the Carrenleufú as the out-flow from Lake Vintter. Its major tributaries include the Tranquilo, Figueroa, Frío, Risopatrón and Melimoyu rivers.

== See also ==
- List of rivers of Chile
- List of rivers of Argentina
