= Hernán Merino =

Chilean police officer (1936–1965)

Hernán Merino Correa
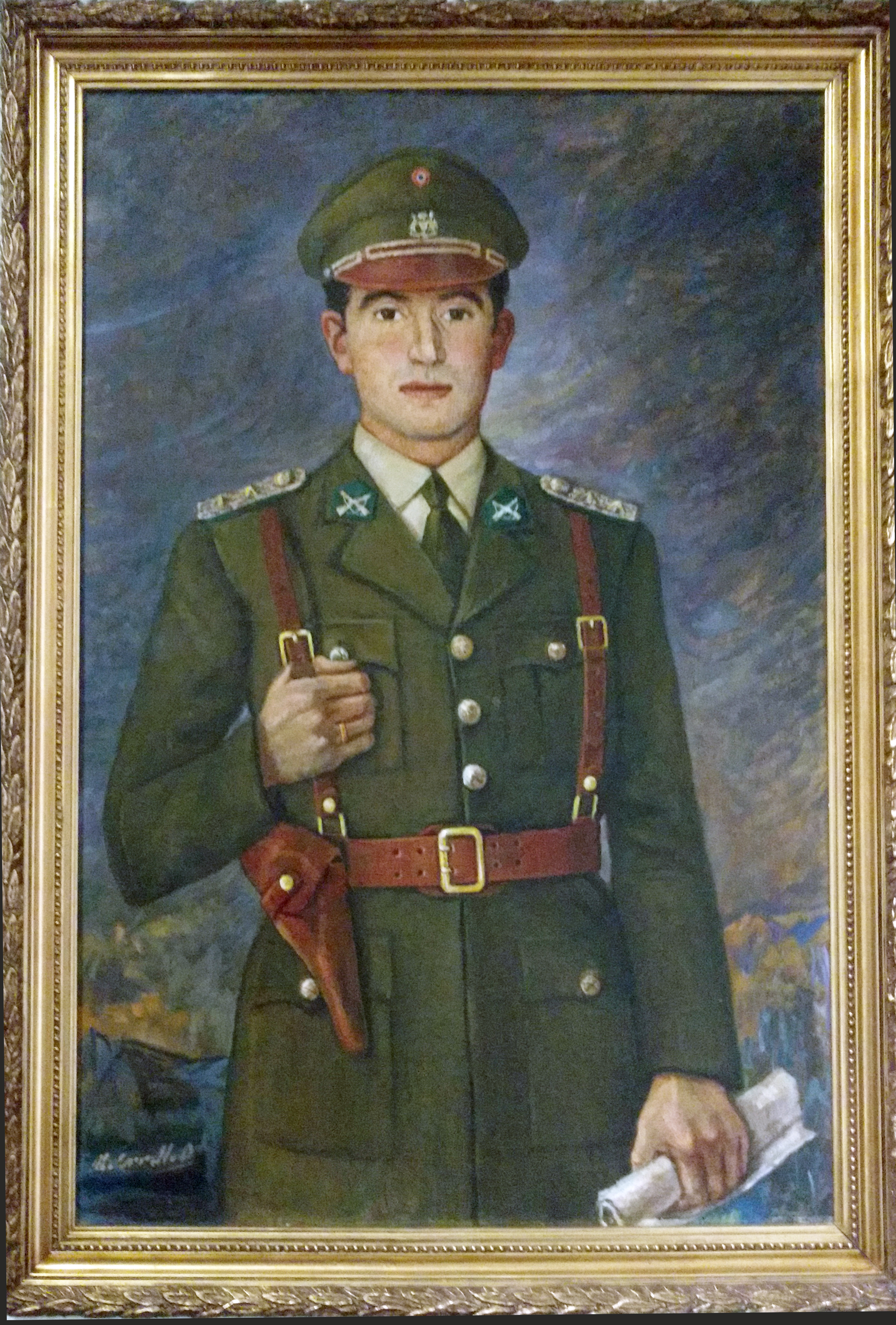
- Painting by Hernán Merino at the Carabineros de Chile Historical Museum
- Born: 17 June 1936; Antofagasta, Chile
- Died: 6 November 1965 (aged 29); Puesto Arbilla, Chile (now part of Santa Cruz Province, Argentina)
- Cause of death: Homicide
- Education: Carabineros de Chile School
- Military career
- Allegiance: Chile
- Branch: Carabineros de Chile
- Years of service: 1956–1965
- Rank: First Lieutenant
- Known for: Laguna del Desierto incident

Hernán Merino Correa (July 17, 1936 – November 6, 1965) was a lieutenant of Carabineros of Chile, killed in confusing circumstances in the Del Desierto Lake in a confrontation with a contingent of the Argentine National Gendarmerie.

== Biography ==
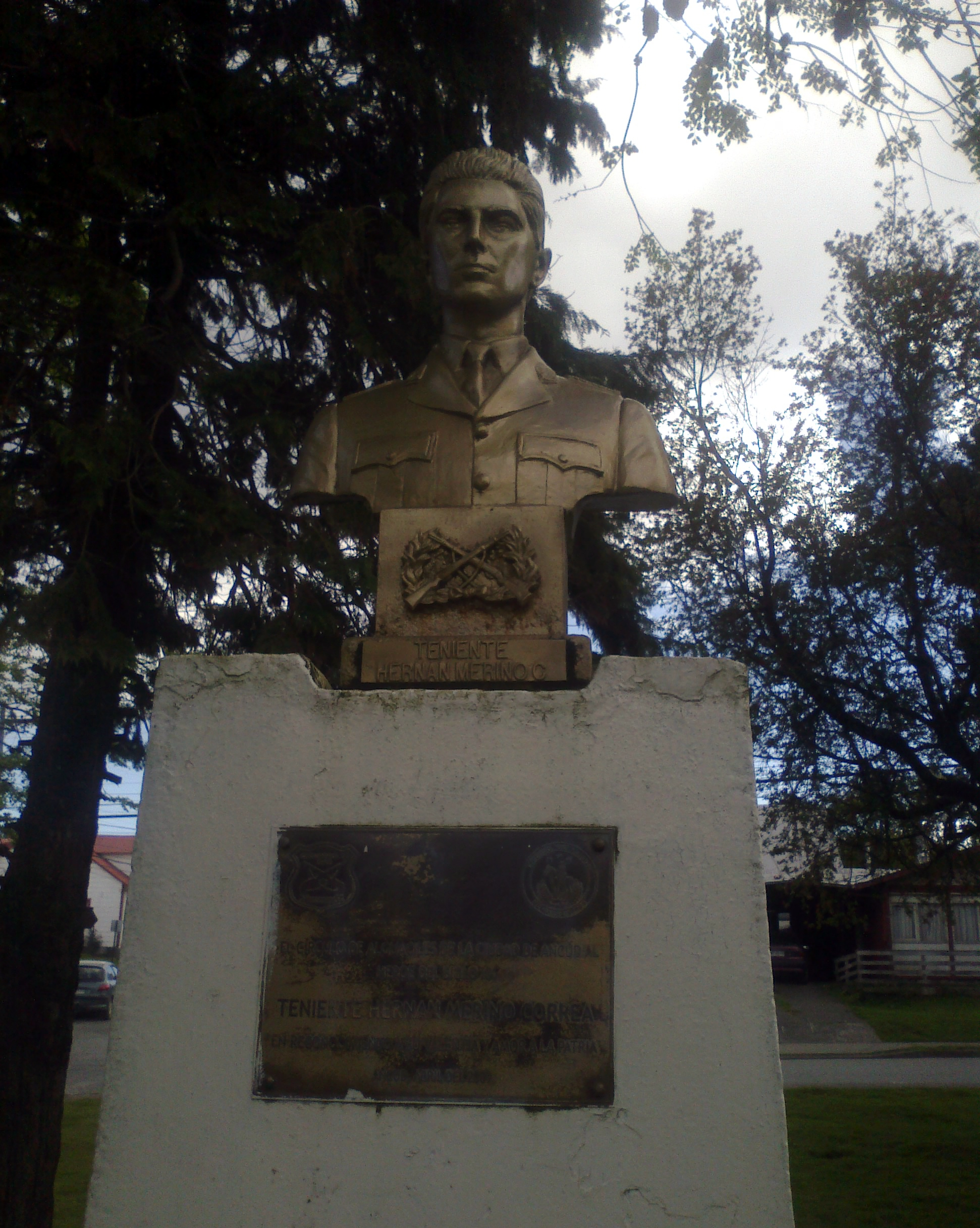
Busto de Hernán Merino en una plaza de Ancud

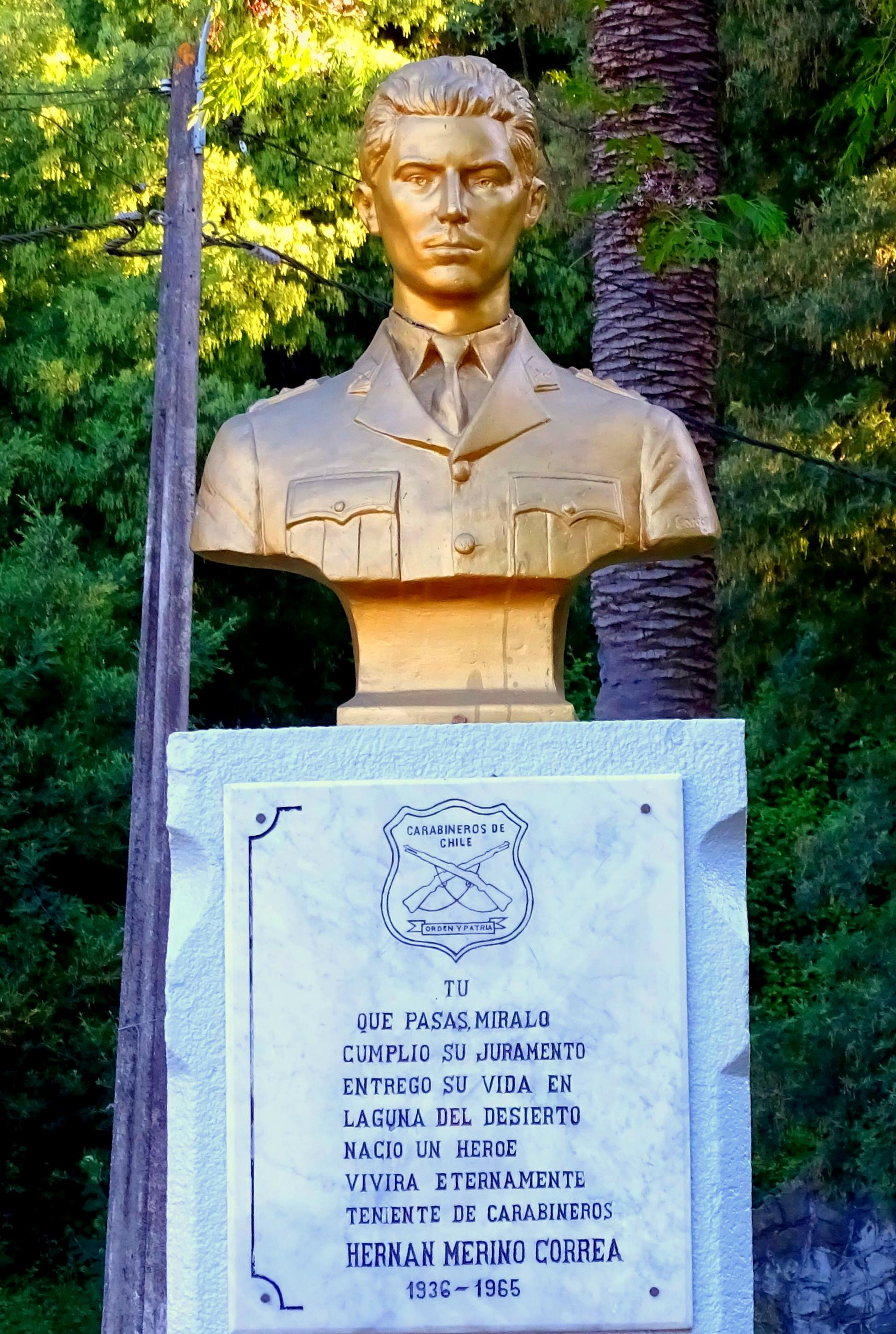
Bust of Hernán Merino Correa present in the Ecuador Square in Concepción, Chile

Hernán Merino Correa was born in Antofagasta, on July 17, 1936, in northern Chile. He was the son of Captain of Carabineros Carlos Merino Charpentier, and Ana Correa de la Fuente. He was the second of four brothers, of whom he and Carlos chose to follow the family tradition of being part of the Carabineros.

In his childhood, his family had to move to Limache, where he began his schooling. In 1953, he graduated from the Liceo Industrial de La Calera as a lathe mechanic. He was an outstanding student and was promoted with excellent grades. Thus, in March 1956 he entered the Carabineros de Chile School, quickly becoming one of the best students, with an outstanding resume, being the first in the activities and missions that he had to execute, as his comrades and teachers testify.

On December 16, 1957, he graduated as second lieutenant. In the initial exercise of his career he had different assignments, one of them was Santa Bárbara, currently located in the Biobío Region, during this period he saved a pregnant mother from drowning in the Mininco River. On April 1, 1961, he was promoted to lieutenant. Between 1962 and 1964 he was assigned to serve in the Prefectura de Aysén, particularly in the 1st, 2nd and 3rd police stations.

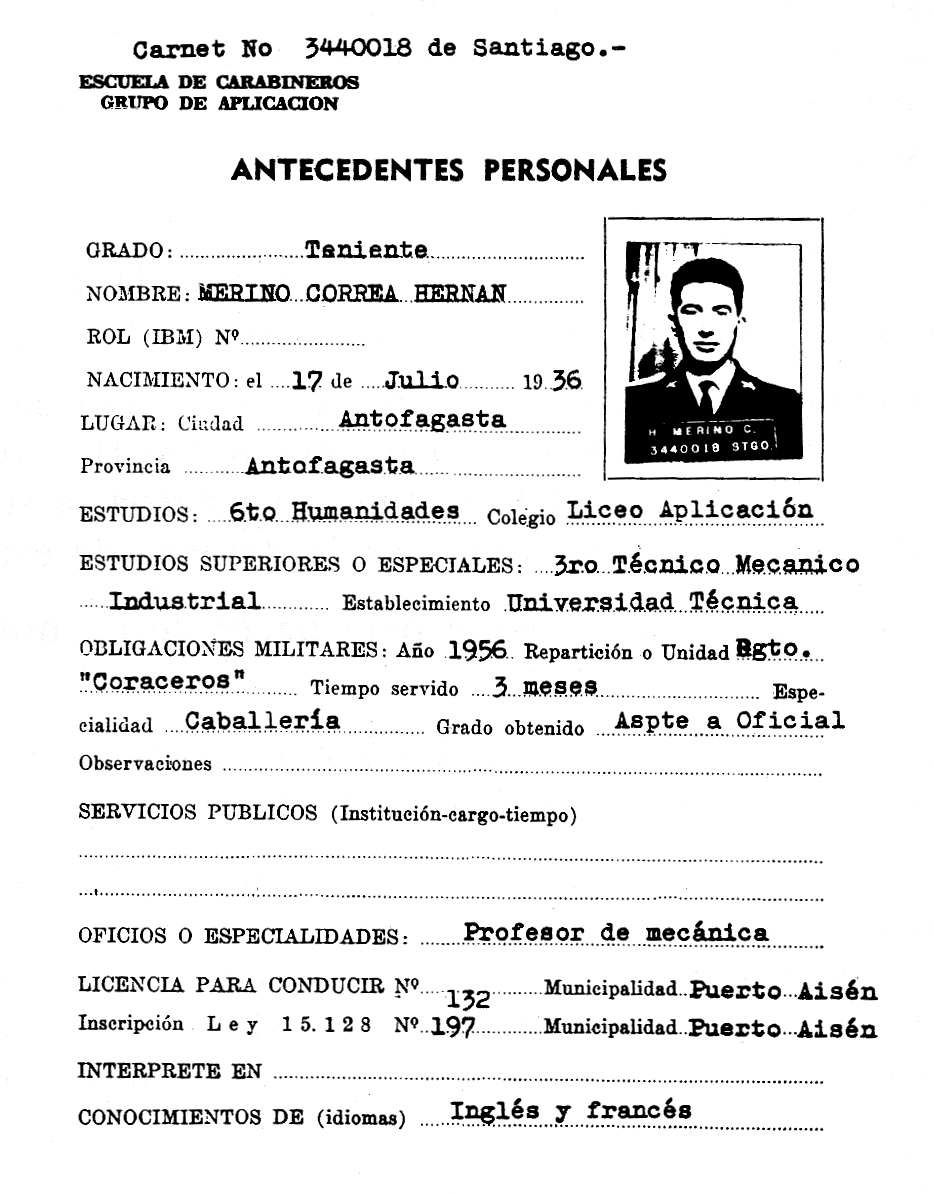
Fragment of the internal file of Lieutenant Hernán Merino Correa in the institution of Carabineros de Chile.

In 1963, Merino rescued the only survivor of a plane crash in the Aysén estuary area.

He then returned to Santiago, to join the second training course for lieutenants. He returned to the Región de Aisén as chief of a lieutenancy, unit in which he was when the border incident occurred in the area of Del Desierto Lake.

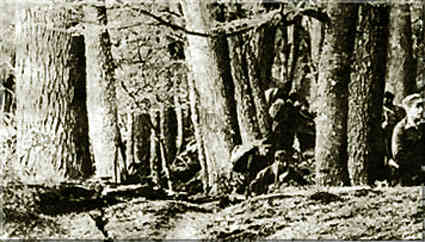
Forces of the Argentine National Gendarmerie in the forest.

=== Death ===
For some time the Chilean settler Domingo Sepúlveda had been denouncing the hostilities of Argentine gendarmes. The Argentine gendarmes demanded that he should go to Río Gallegos, the capital of the Argentine province of Santa Cruz, to "regularize" his situation. Apparently, the Chilean citizen resisted this procedure, which is why he spoke of "hostile gendarmes".

On November 6, 1965, a group of Carabineros, including Merino, went to inspect the settlers' house, and other sources reported at the time that, apart from other incidents of Argentine gendarmes entering Chile through this sector, as well as the settler, some other people, government agencies in the area and the Chilean Carabineros denounced these events to the central authorities in Santiago, Chile, denounced these facts to the central authorities in Santiago, but it seems that they were not listened to or even less read, because at the time, as in 1978, the dispute of this territory, as well as those of the Beagle Channel, further south, with Argentina, was at its height, which caused the fatal situation to be unleashed.

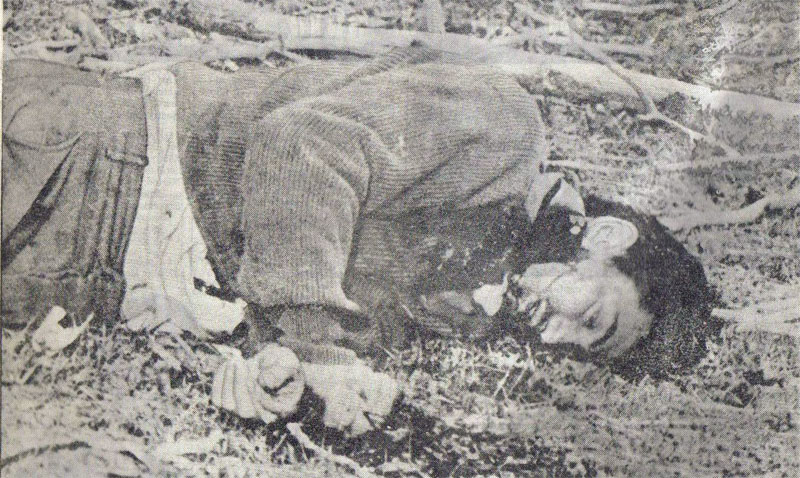
Photograph of Lieutenant Merino mortally wounded.

Lieutenant Merino, when it corresponded to him to make sovereignty in the area of Laguna del Desierto and upon realizing that the area was claimed by Argentina, wrote to Major Torres: "I will maintain the situation as far as possible, avoiding all incidents, as long as they do not try to take us into custody, in which case I will maintain sovereignty even if it burns me".

At around 4:30 p.m., two children -children of the Chilean settlers- burst in saying that they had seen soldiers with helmets in the forest approaching the camp.

The Argentine gendarmes began to approach Major Torres, who was trying to parley with them. The Argentine gendarmes, numerically superior, began to take aim, and Lieutenant Merino, noticing the delicate situation, ran towards his superior, holding his rifle to dissuade the gendarmes who were ambushing him, saying "I support you, my major".'

Major Torres reportedly signaled to the gendarmes that they could leave, as the Chileans did not intend to shoot, however, Merino's appearance was considered an offensive gesture by the Argentine gendarmes, who opened fire.

When the shooting stopped, Lieutenant Merino lay dead. A subalphérez of the group of gendarmes justified his men, saying: "You are to blame for not having left here before...!"

The Chilean carabineros did not respond, a witness would later say "silence filled the atmosphere rarefied by the smell of deadly gunpowder.".

According to the Argentine argument, the gendarmes gave the order to lay down their arms, which the carabineros refused to do, causing a nervous situation and the fatal outcome.

The Chilean officers were taken prisoner until November 8, when they were released.

== Legacy ==
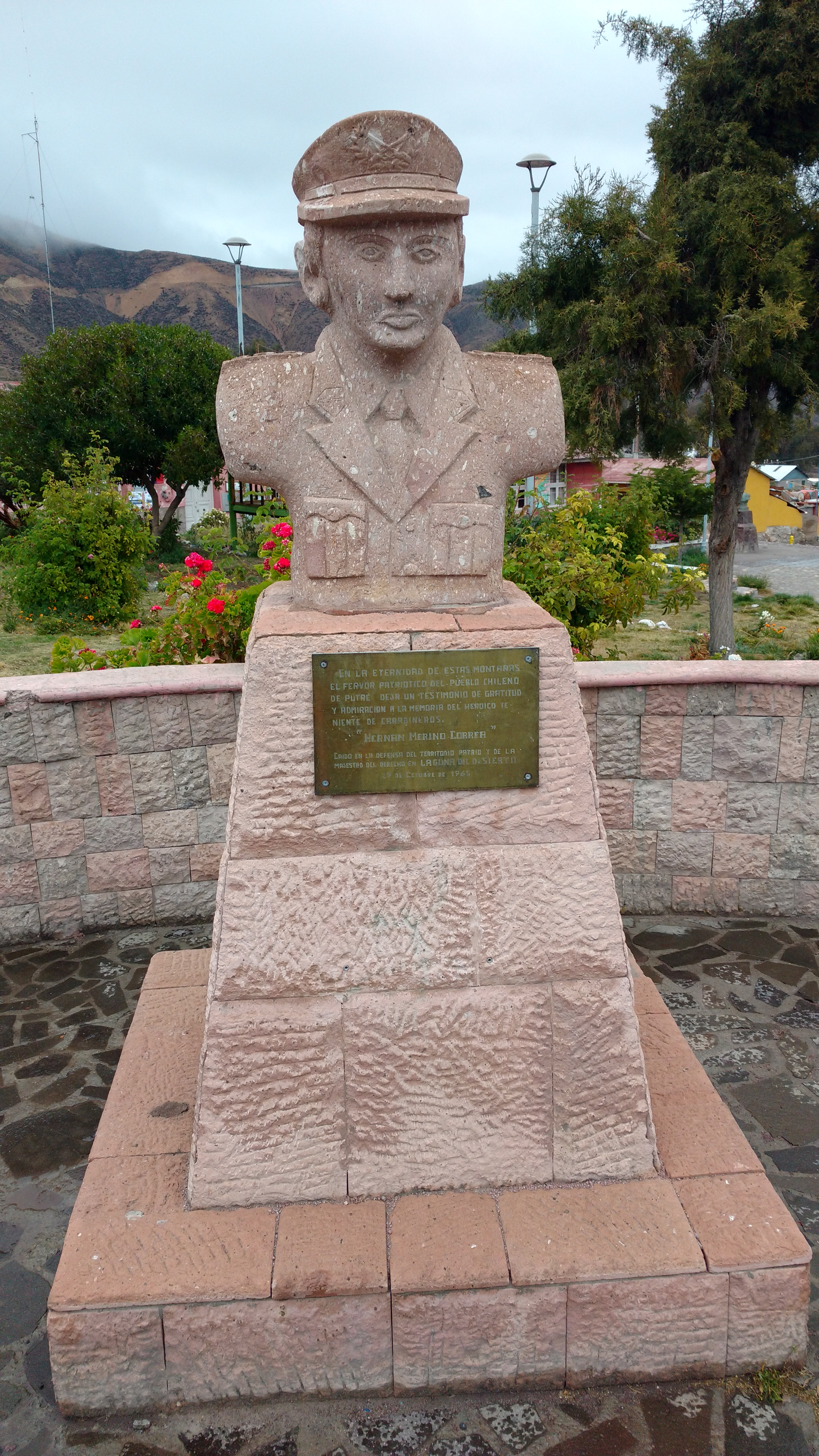
Bust of Hernán Merino in Putre

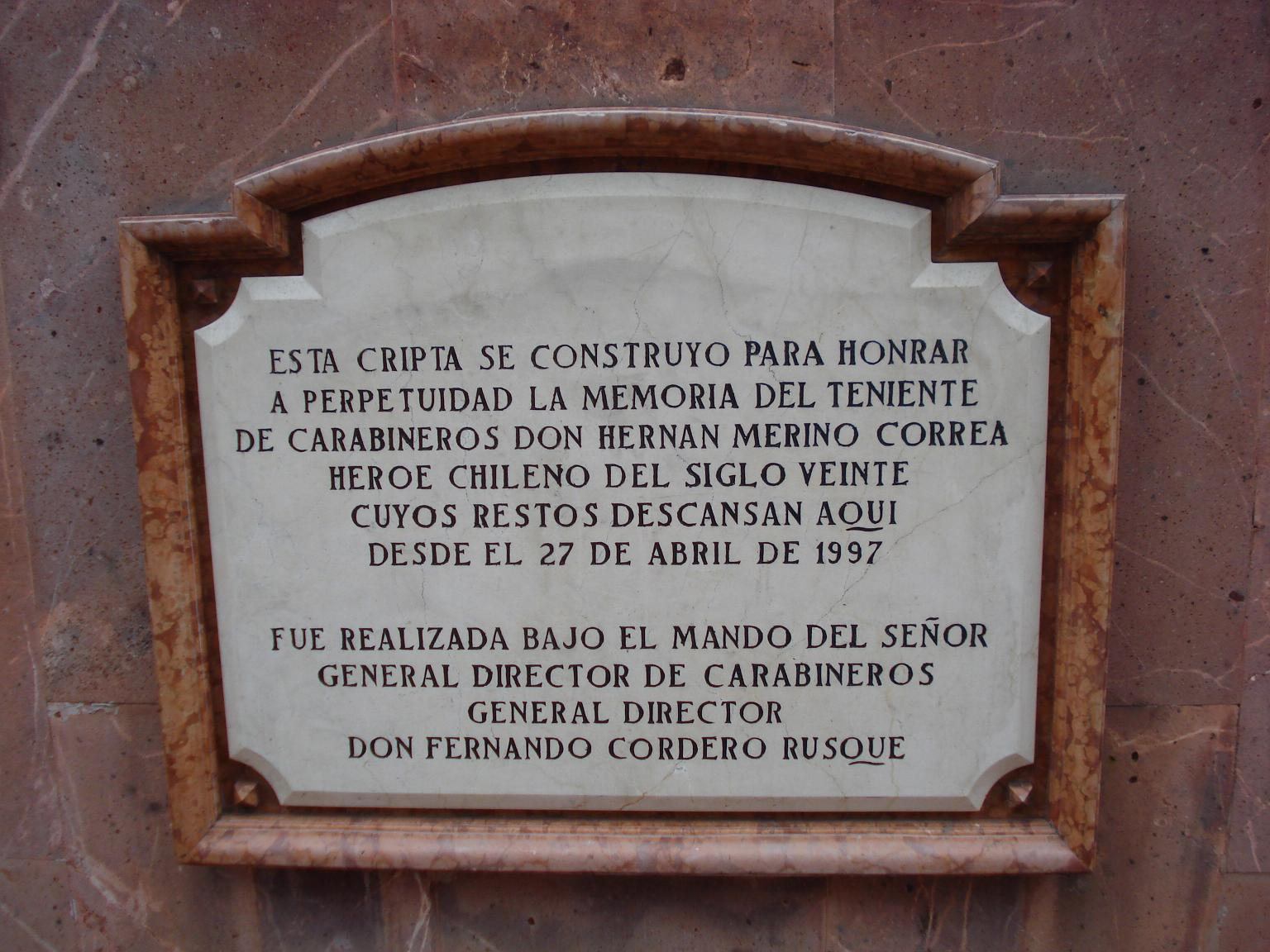
Crypt of Lieutenant Merino in the Alameda before been moved to the Carabineros Museum in 2023.

700 Carabineros gathered to wait for the order to attack the Argentine gendarmes, but the order from the Chilean government never came.

The remains of Lieutenant Hernán Merino Correa were laid to rest in a chapel erected at the Carabineros de Chile School. From there they were transferred to the Metropolitan Cathedral of Santiago, being buried in the Santiago General Cemetery, after being bid farewell by thousands of Chileans and high authorities of the Carabineros and the government, including the president Eduardo Frei Montalva. Years later, on April 26, 1997, Merino's remains were moved with honors to the crypt built in his memory at the foot of the martyrs' monument.

During the decades following his death, Hernán Merino has received a long series of recognitions and honors, including acts of commemoration throughout Chile by Carabineros every November 6, who consider him one of their greatest heroes and an example of service. In addition, his name has been used to baptize schools (in Cochrane, Valdivia, Santiago, etc.). Finally, in the year 2005 a tribute was paid to him at the Senate of Chile by different parliamentarians representing the Chilean political parties, where he was also attended by family members and delegations from the Corporation for the Defense of Sovereignty, the Center for Military Studies, the Salón Teniente Merino and delegations from the Carabineros.

== See also ==
- Del Desierto Lake
- Laguna del Desierto incident
