= Carrenleufú =

Coordinates: 43°35′S 71°42′W

- Municipality and village
- Interactive map of Carrenleufú
- Country: Argentina
- Province: Chubut Province
- Department: Languiñeo Department
- Time zone: UTC−3 (ART)
- Climate: Cfb

Carrenleufú is a village and municipality in Chubut Province in southern Argentina.

== Etymology ==
Carrenleufú means "river of the green waters", or simply "greenriver".

== Climate ==
Climate data for Carrenleufú (1964–1980)
Month	Jan	Feb	Mar	Apr	May	Jun	Jul	Aug	Sep	Oct	Nov	Dec	Year
Average precipitation mm (inches)	53.10 (2.09)	52.62 (2.07)	52.84 (2.08)	75.39 (2.97)	190.03 (7.48)	151.40 (5.96)	198.22 (7.80)	164.41 (6.47)	96.08 (3.78)	86.72 (3.41)	48.73 (1.92)	81.28 (3.20)	1,250.9 (49.25)
Source: Secretaria de Mineria
