= Languiñeo Department =

- Departamento Languiñeo
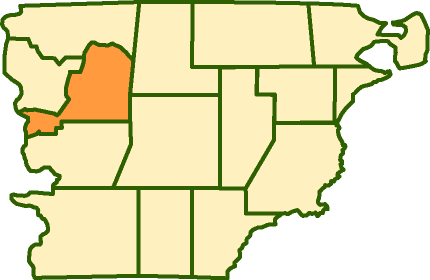
- Coordinates: 43°28′S 70°47′W
- Country: Argentina
- Province: Chubut Province
- Founded: 11 June 1921
- Capital: Tecka

Area
  - Total: 15,339 km^{2} (5,922 sq mi)

Population (2001)
  - Total: 3,017
  - Density: 0.1/km^{2} (0.26/sq mi)
- Time zone: UTC−3 (ART)
- Post Code: U9201

Languiñeo Department is a department of Chubut Province in Argentina.

The provincial subdivision has a population of about 3,017 inhabitants in an area of 15,339 km^{2}, and its capital city is Tecka, which is located around 1,899 km from the Capital federal.

== Settlements ==
- Tecka
- Aldea Epulef
- Carrenleufú
- Colan Conhué
- El Corcovado
- Elena
- Esperanza
- Jaramillo
- La Carlota
- La Martha
- Languineo
- Las Salinas
- El Pato Negro
- Piedra Parada
- Pampa de Agnia
- Paso del Sapo
- El Molle
- Vargas
