= Wet Andes =

Subregion of the Andes

- Andes Ap Iwan
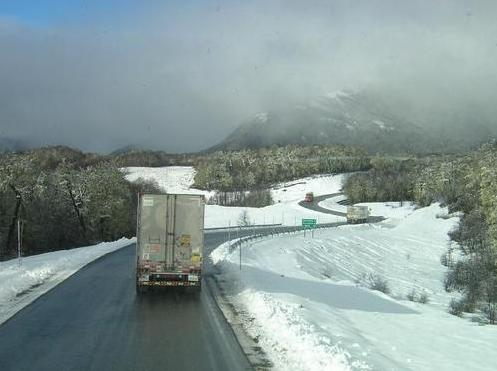
- View of Cardenal Antonio Samoré Pass during winter, latitude 41°S

Highest point
- Peak: Domuyo
- Elevation: 4,709 m (15,449 ft)

Dimensions
- Length: 2,500 km (1,600 mi)

Geography
- Countries: Chile, Argentina
- Parent range: Andes

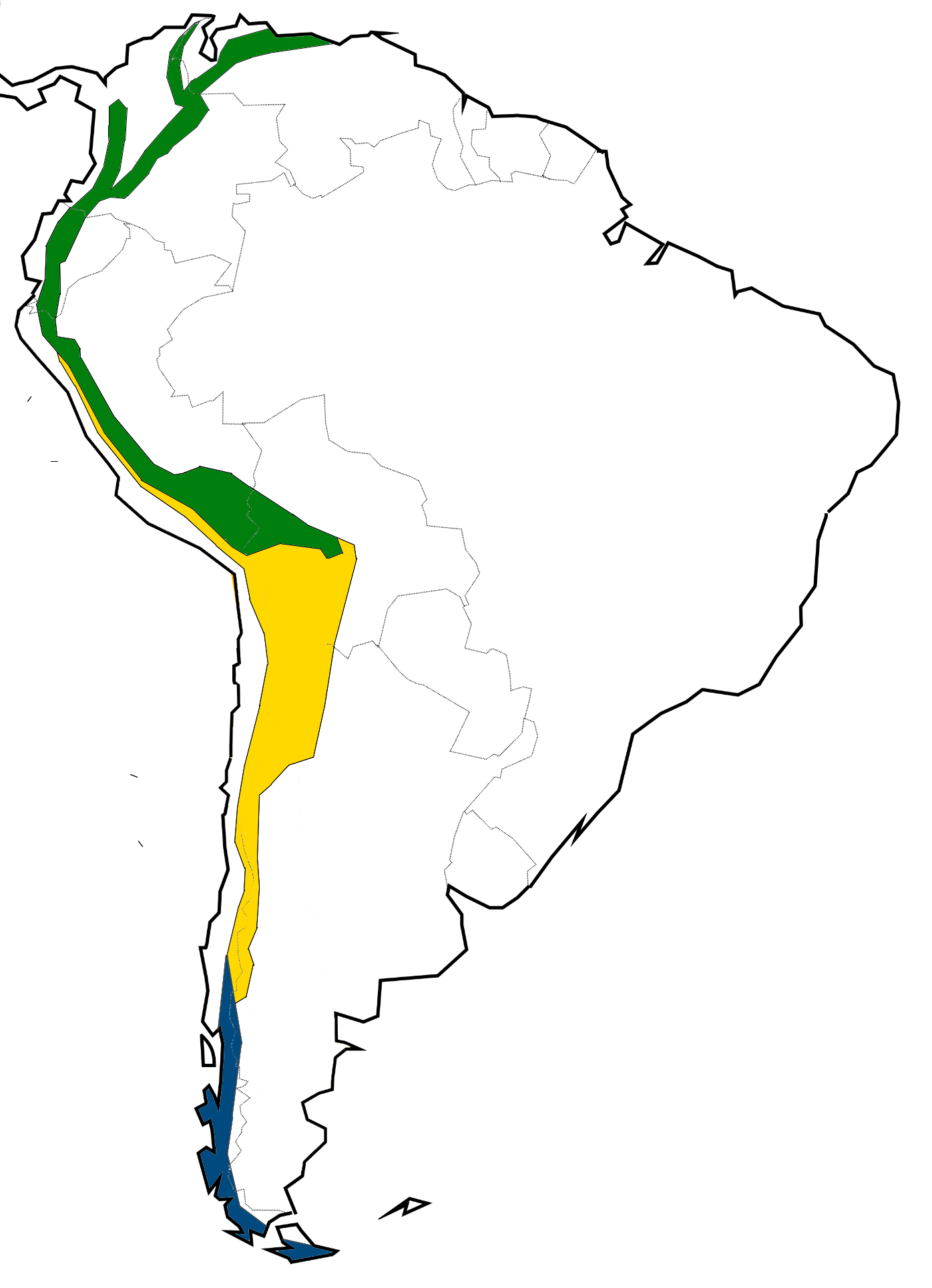
Map of the climatic regions of the Andes. The Wet Andes are shown in dark blue. The Dry Andes are shown in yellow and the Tropical Andes in green.

The Wet Andes (Spanish: Andes húmedos) is a climatic and glaciological subregion of the Andes. Together with the Dry Andes it is one of the two subregions of the Argentine and Chilean Andes.

== Background ==
The Wet Andes runs from a latitude of 35°S to Cape Horn at 56°S. According to Luis Lliboutry the Wet Andes can be classified after the absence of penitentes. In Argentina well developed penitentes are found as south as on Lanín Volcano (40°S). Another difference is that the Wet Andes is largely devoid of rock glaciers. The glaciers of the Wet Andes have a far more stable line of equilibrium than those of the Dry Andes due to summer precipitations, low thermal oscillations and an overall high moisture.
