= Techado Negro =

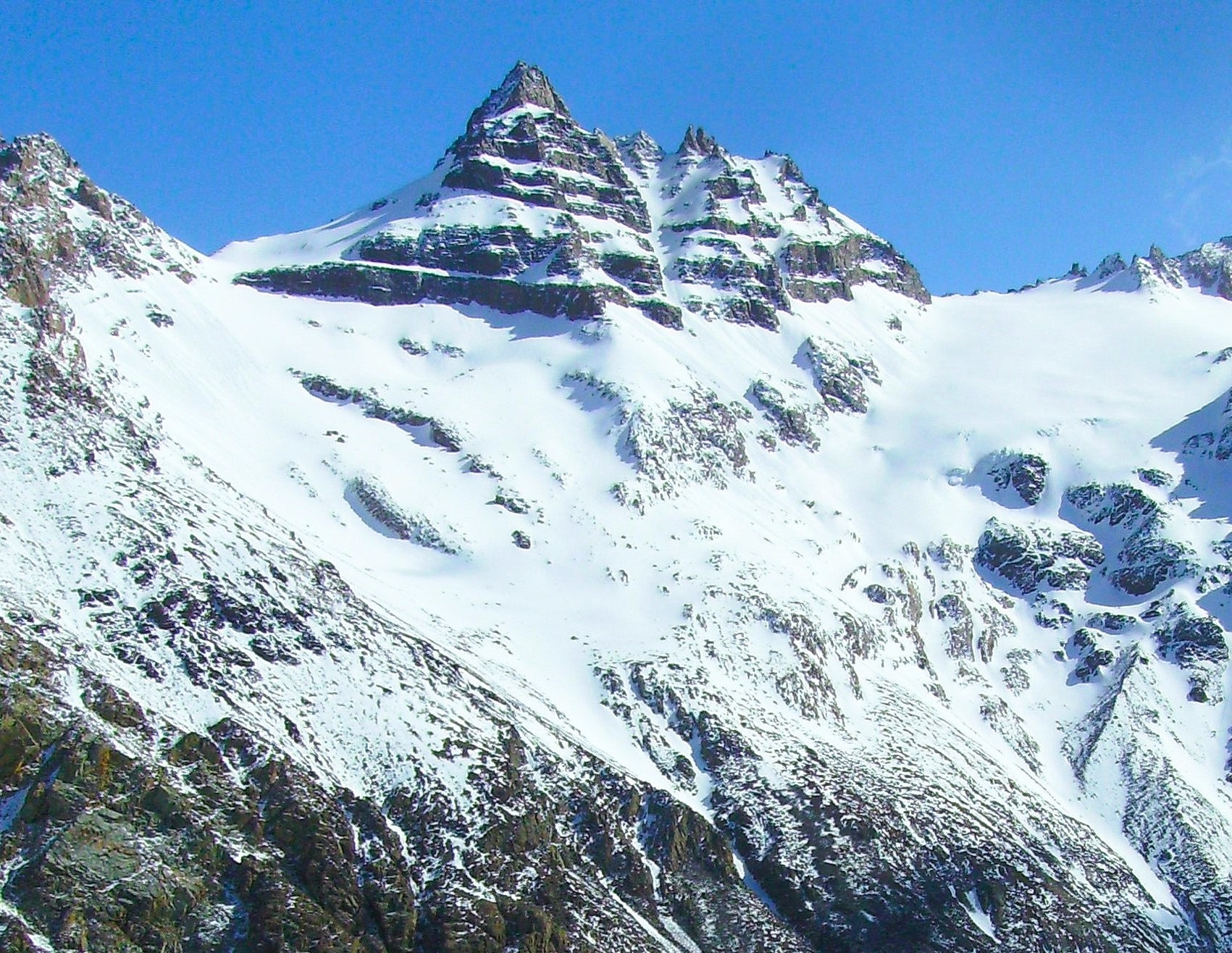
- Northeast aspect

Highest point
- Elevation: 2,152 m (7,060 ft)
- Prominence: 152 m (499 ft)
- Parent peak: Fitz Roy
- Isolation: 1.22 km (0.76 mi)
- Coordinates: 49°18′05″S 73°00′54″W

Naming
- Etymology: Black Roof Hill

Geography
- Location within Argentina Location within South America Location within Southern Patagonia
- Interactive map of Techado Negro
- Country: Argentina
- Province: Santa Cruz
- Protected area: Los Glaciares National Park
- Parent range: Andes
- Topo map: IGN 4769‑III El Chaltén

Geology
- Rock type: Metasedimentary rock

Climbing
- First ascent: 1961

Techado Negro is a mountain in Santa Cruz Province, Argentina.

== Description ==
Techado Negro, also known as Cerro Techado Negro, is a 2,152-meter-elevation (7,060-foot) summit in the Andes. The peak is located four kilometers (2.5 miles) southeast of Fitz Roy and five kilometers (3.1 miles) west-northwest of El Chaltén, in Los Glaciares National Park of Patagonia. Precipitation runoff from the mountain's slopes drains to Viedma Lake. Topographic relief is significant as the summit rises 1,510 meters (4,954 ft) above Laguna Torre in 1.5 kilometers (0.93 mile), and 1,250 meters (4,100 ft) above Laguna Sucia in 1.5 km (0.93 mi). The first ascent of the summit was made by Sergio Bossini in 1961. The descriptive Spanish toponym Techado Negro, which translates as Black Roof, was applied by Louis Lliboutry in 1952. The nearest higher peak is Mojón Rojo, 1.22 kilometers (0.76 mile) to the west-northwest.

== Climate ==
According to the Köppen climate classification system, Techado Negro is located in a tundra climate zone with cold, snowy winters, and cool summers. Weather systems are forced upward by the mountains (orographic lift), causing moisture to drop in the form of rain and snow. This climate supports the Rio Blanco Glacier on the north slope of the peak. The months of November through March offer the most favorable weather for visiting or climbing in this area.

== Gallery ==
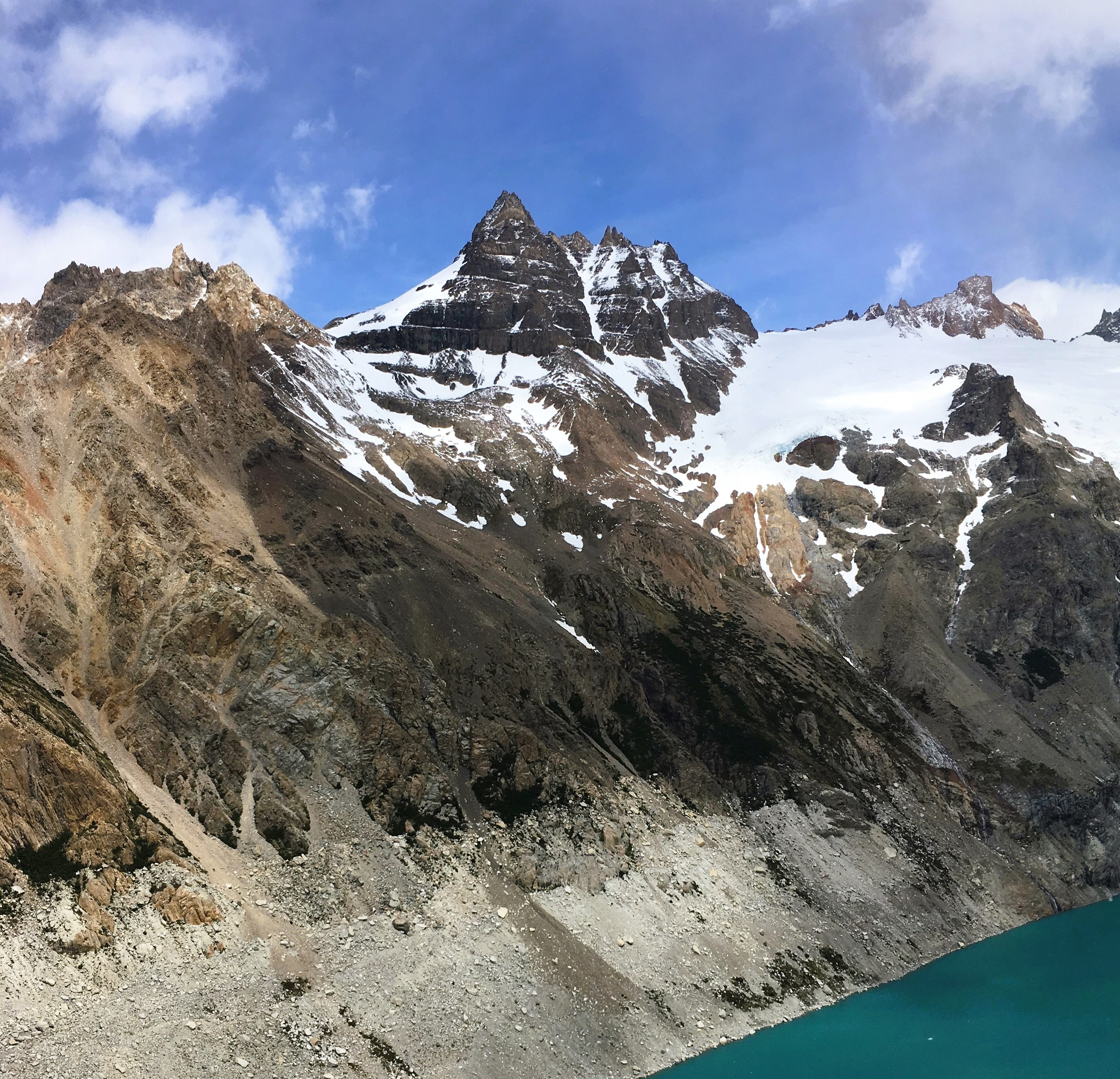
Northeast aspect

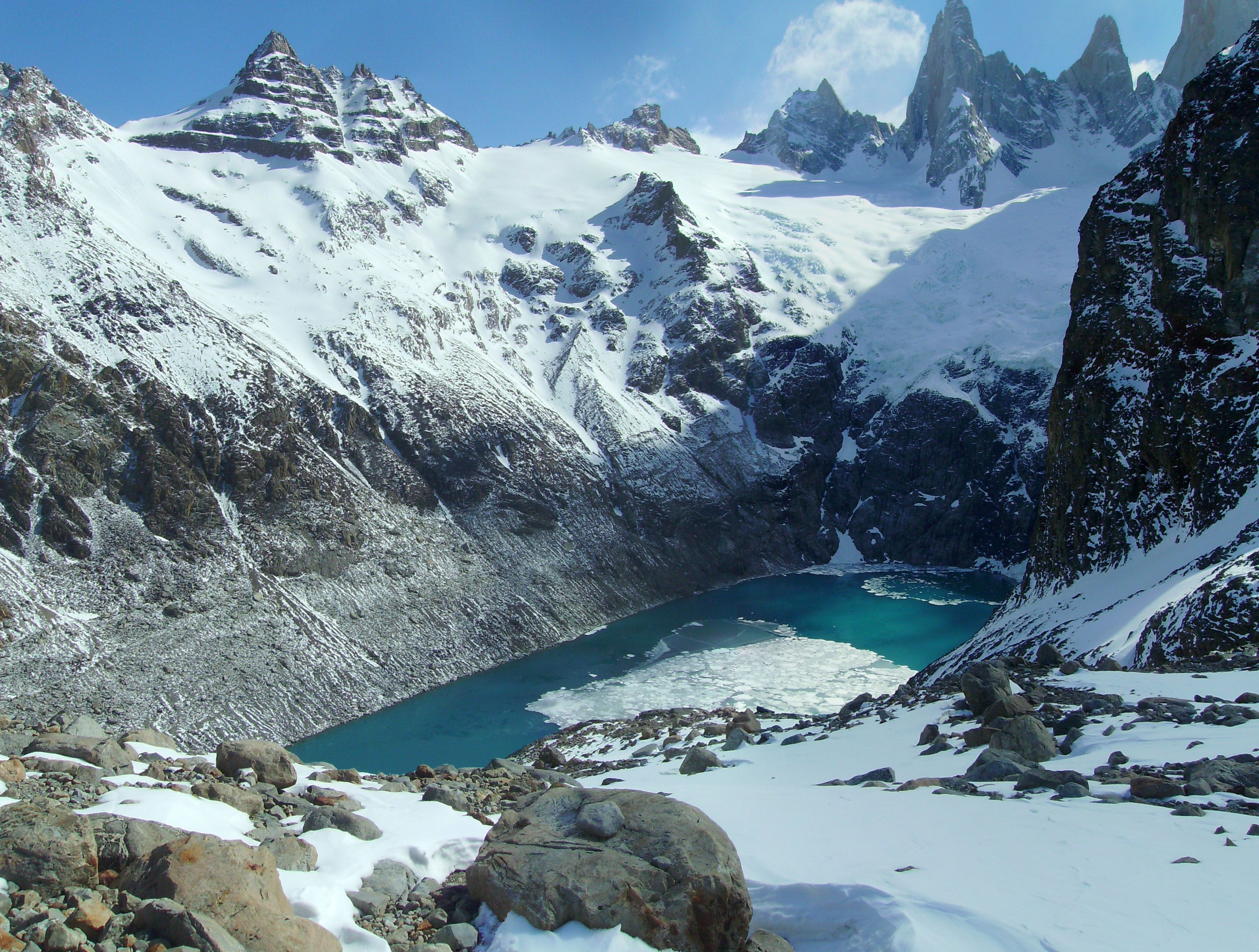
Techado Negro at upper left, with Laguna Sucia below

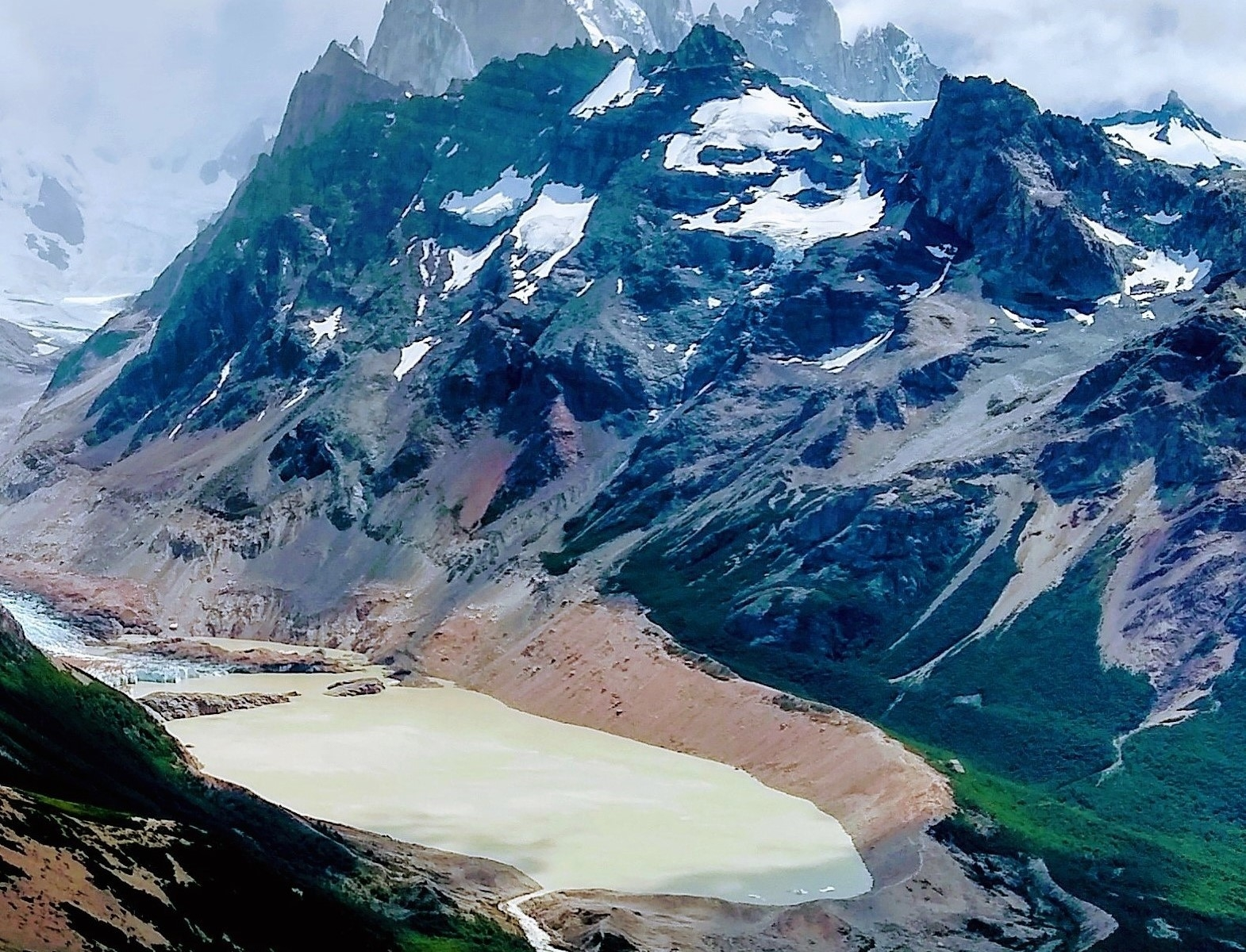
Southeast aspect of Techado Negro rises above Laguna Torre

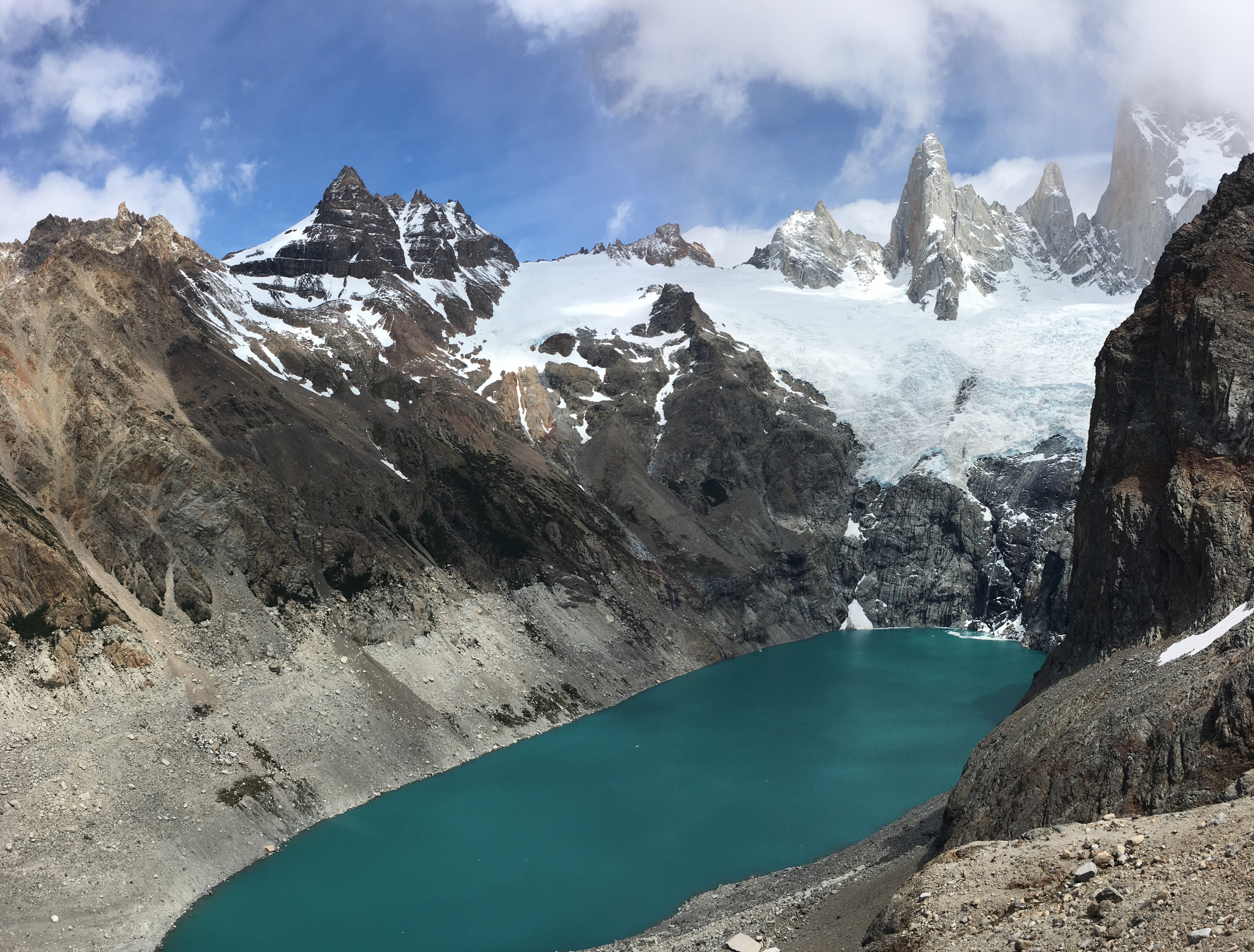
Techado Negro at upper left, with Laguna Sucia below

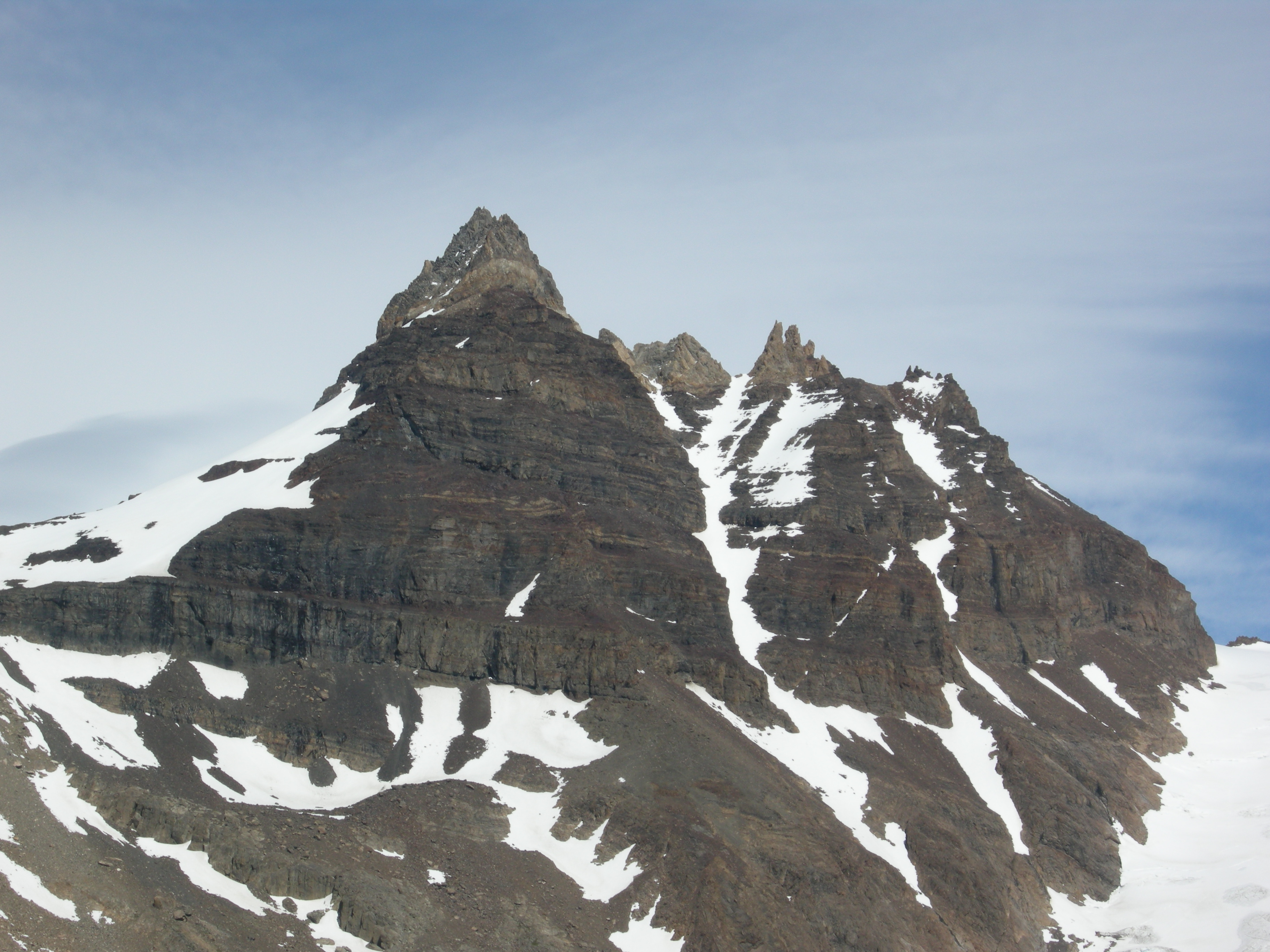
Northeast aspect

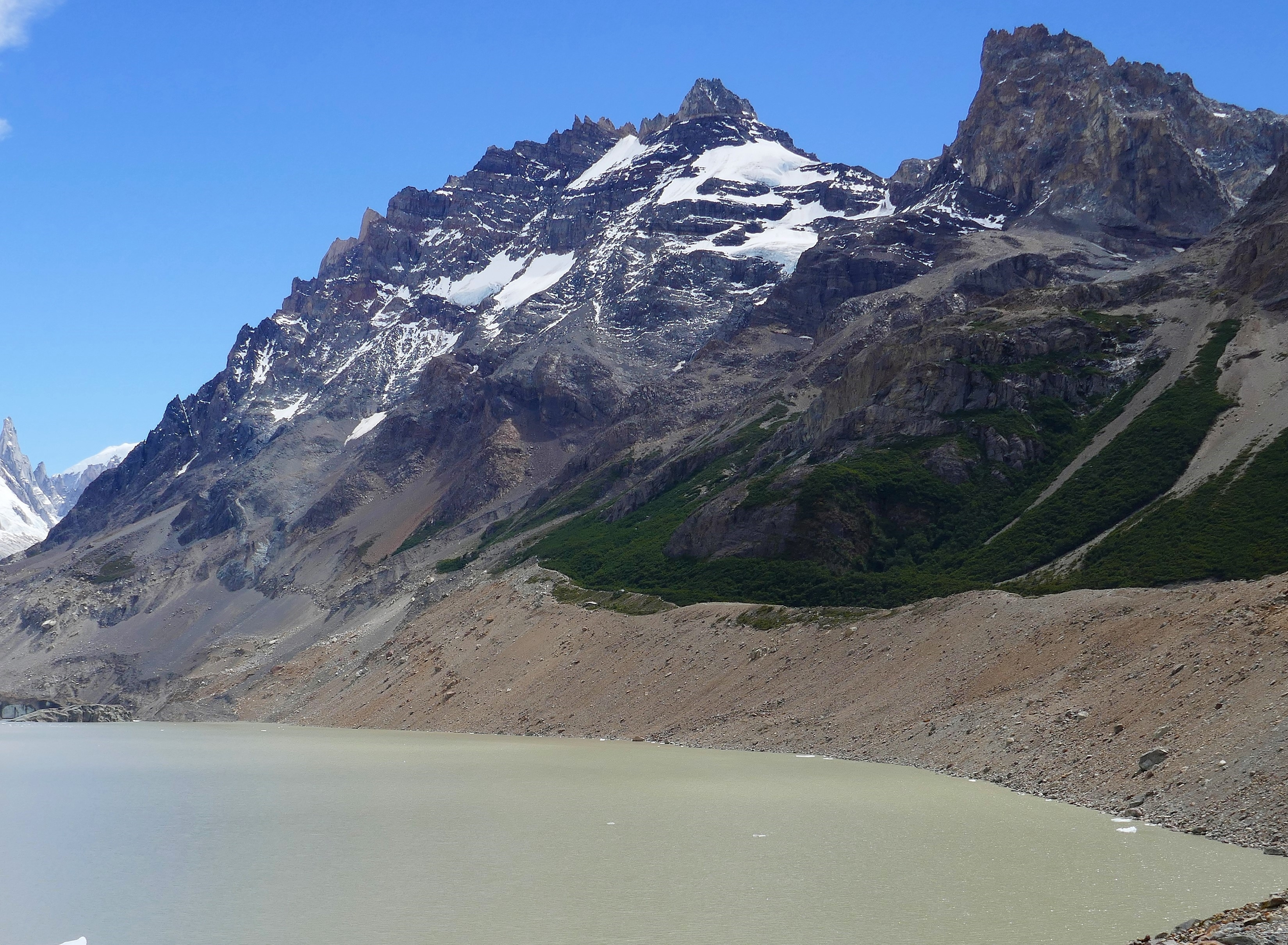
Techado Negro rises above Laguna Torre

== See also ==
- List of mountains in Argentina
