= Dorthe Dahl-Jensen =

Danish geophysicist and glaciologist

- Born: 8 September 1958 (age 68); Copenhagen, Denmark
- Education: University of Copenhagen (M.Sc, Ph.D)
- Awards: EU Descartes Prize (2008); Vega medal (2008); Amalienborgprisen (2009); Munch prisen (2009); Louis Agassiz Medal (2009); Balzan Prize (2022); BBVA Foundation Frontiers of Knowledge Award (2023)
- Scientific career
- Fields: Ice and Climate
- Workplaces: University of Manitoba; Centre for Earth Observation Science; University of Copenhagen; Niels Bohr Institute

Dorthe Dahl-Jensen (born 8 September 1958) is a Danish palaeoclimatology professor and researcher at the Centre for Ice and Climate at the Niels Bohr Institute, University of Copenhagen in Denmark. Her primary field is the study of ice and climate, specifically the reconstruction of climate records from ice cores and borehole data; ice flow models to date ice cores; continuum mechanical properties of anisotropic ice; ice in the Solar System; and the history and evolution of the Greenland Ice Sheet.

== Education and career ==
Dahl-Jensen has an M.Sc. In Geophysics (1984) and a Ph.D. in geophysics (1988) from the University of Copenhagen.

As a student in 1980, Dahl-Jensen took part in ice-core drilling at the Dye 3 site on the Greenland ice sheet, a project led by Willi Dansgaard. Although Dansgaard had a rule that no women were allowed at the drilling site, he allowed Dahl-Jensen to participate. She and her drilling partner Jørgen Peder Steffensen later married.

She was hired by Copenhagen's Niels Bohr Institute as an associate professor in 1997; in 2007, she became head of its Centre for Ice and Climate. In 2022 she was awarded the Seligman Crystal by the International Glaciological Society.

== Research ==
Dahl-Jensen led the North Greenland Eemian Ice Drilling (NEEM) project: a 14-nation research team which spent four years drilling and analysing a 2,540 m (8,330 ft) ice core reaching back to the last interglacial period 130–113 thousand years BP, the results of which were published in the journal Nature in 2013. The paper suggests, based on ice sheet simulations, that during the last interglacial Greenland might have contributed around 2 m (6 ft 7 in) to the observed 4–8 m (13–26 ft) sea level rise. This implies that Antarctic ice melting was a significant factor.

In July, 2015, a collaborative group of researchers from the U.S., Germany, and Denmark initiated a study of Renland, Greenland area for deep ice core drilling. The purpose was to develop a better understanding of climate change by understanding past climate changes.

Another collaborative project is a deep ice core drilling project, located in Greenland which is expected to shed light on the northeast Greenland ice stream and its contributions to a rise in sea level. This could give details on what to expect for future sea level rise due to ice sheet mass loss in Greenland. According to The Guardian in 2021:

Large-scale melting of the Greenland ice sheet would have long-term global consequences, beyond rising sea levels. It could halt the Gulf Stream ocean current, with potential knock-on effects on the Amazon rainforest and tropical monsoons.

Starting in July, 2016, over the course of seven years, the deep ice core drilling called the EGRIP (East Greenland Icecore Project) project continued until July 21, 2023. Dahl-Jensen was the leader of the project team including scientists from the Danish Centre for Ice and Climate at the Niels Bohr Institute, University of Copenhage and Alfred Wgener Institute. Over seven years they drilled in an ice stream that is a flowing ice sheet of 2670 meters thick. Eventually, near the bottom, the researchers found sand and rock.

== Awards ==
- 2008 - EU Descartes Prize (as part of the European Project for Ice Coring in Antarctica (EPICA))
- 2008 - Vega medal from the Swedish Society for Anthropology and Geography
- 2009 - Amalienborgprisen
- 2009 - Munch prisen
- 2009 - Louis Agassiz Medal from the European Geosciences Union
- 2014 - Member of the Royal Danish Academy of Sciences and Letters
- 2014 - Louis Agassiz Medal from European Geosciences Union
- 2020 - Mohn Prize Laureate
- 2022 - Balzan Prize for Glaciation and Ice Sheet Dynamics together with Hans Oerlemans.
- 2022 - Member of the Academia Europaea
- 2022 - Seligman Crystal from the International Glaciological Society.
- 2023 - BBVA Foundation Frontiers of Knowledge Award
- 2025 - International Fellow elected to the Royal Society of Canada
