= Dry Andes =

Subregion of the Andes

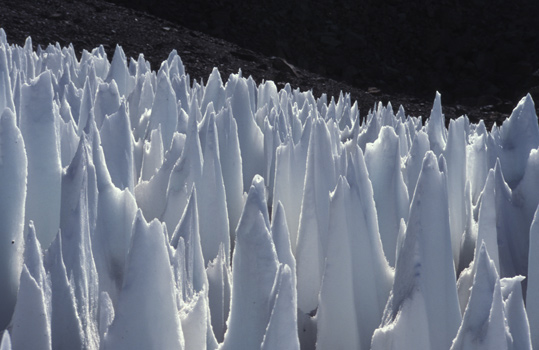
- Field of penitentes on the upper Río Blanco, Central Andes of Argentina

Highest point
- Peak: Aconcagua
- Elevation: 6,961 m (22,838 ft)

Dimensions
- Length: 1,200 km (750 mi)

Geography
- Countries: Chile, Northwest Argentina, Bolivia
- Parent range: Andes

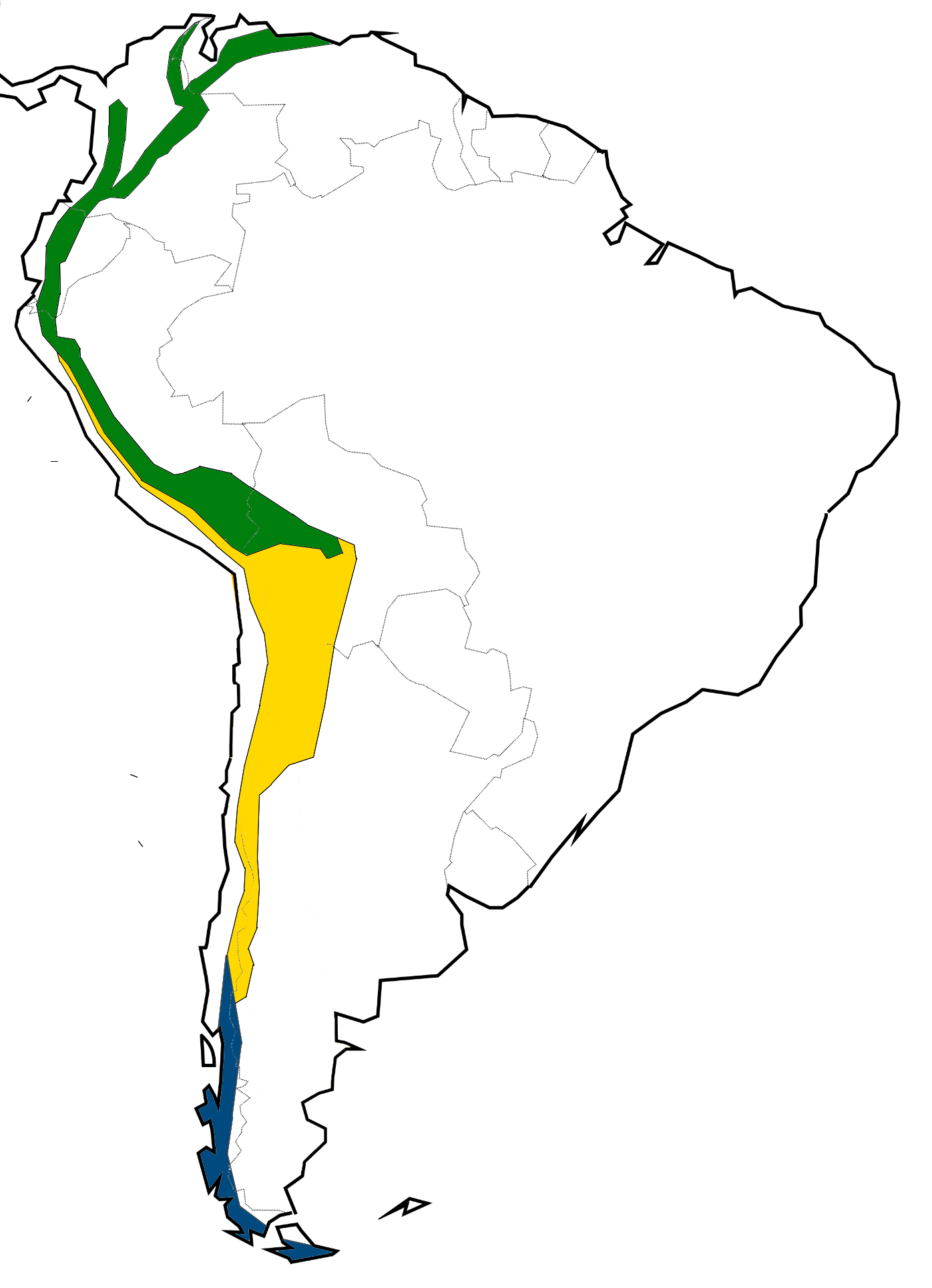
Map of the climatic regions of the Andes. The Dry Andes are shown in yellow. The Tropical Andes are shown in green and the Wet Andes in dark blue.

The Dry Andes (Spanish: Andes áridos) is a climatic and glaciological subregion of the Andes. Together with the Wet Andes it is one of the two subregions of the Argentine and Chilean Andes.

The Dry Andes runs from the Atacama Desert in northern Chile and Northwest Argentina south to a latitude of 35°S in Chile. In Argentina the Dry Andes reaches 40°S due to the leeward effect of the Andes. According to Luis Lliboutry the Dry Andes can be defined by the distribution of penitentes. The southernmost well-developed penitentes are found on Lanín Volcano.

Rock glaciers occur in parts of the Dry Andes, but are lacking in the more southern Wet Andes. In the Dry Andes, ordinary glaciers develop usually at higher altitudes than rock glaciers. Around Aconcagua rock glaciers reach altitudes as low as 900 m a.s.l.

The Principal Cordillera near Santiago may have been subject to significant glaciation as early as 1 million years ago, as indicated by the development of glacial valleys.

== Paleogeography, paleoclimatology and paleoglaciology ==
Though precipitation increases with the height, there are semiarid conditions in the nearly 7,000 metres (23,000 ft) towering mountains of the Andes. This dry steppe climate is considered to be of the subtropic type at 32-34° S. In the valley bottoms only dwarf shrubs grow. The largest glaciers, e.g. the Plomo glacier and the Horcones glacier, do not reach 10 kilometres (6.2 mi) in length; the ice thickness is not very significant. During glacial times however, c. 20,000 years ago, the glaciers were over ten times longer. On the east-side of this section of the Mendoza Andes they flowed down to 2,060 metres (6,760 ft) and on the west-side to c. 1,220 metres (4,000 ft). The massifs of Cerro Aconcagua 6,962 metres (22,841 ft), Cerro Tupungato 6,550 metres (21,490 ft) and Nevado Juncal 6,110 metres (20,050 ft) are situated deca-kilometres away from each other and were connected by a joint ice stream network. Its dendritic glacier arms, i.e. components of valley glaciers, were up to 112.5 kilometres (69.9 mi) long, over 1,250 metres (4,100 ft) thick and spanned a vertical distance of 5,150 metres (16,900 ft). The climatic glacier snowline (ELA) was lowered from the current 4,600 metres (15,100 ft) to 3,200 metres (10,500 ft) during glacial times.
