= Almut Iken =

German glaciologist

- Born: 1 October 1933
- Died: 10 December 2018 (aged 85)
- Education: Heidelberg University, McGill University, ETH Zurich
- Occupation: Glaciologist

Almut Iken (1 October 1933 – 10 December 2018) was a German glaciologist most noted for her work on the role of basal meltwater in subglacial motion. In 2011, she was awarded the Seligman Crystal award from the International Glaciological Society and remains the only female recipient.

== Early life and education ==
Iken was born in Bremen, Germany on 1 October 1933. Through secondary school, she had a particular interest in physics, motivating her to take science and math courses. She went on to study physics at the University Heidelberg and obtained a Bachelor's degree in 1959. She worked as a senior high school lecturer after her Bachelor's studies, before pursuing a PhD at McGill University in Montreal in 1970 under the supervision of Fritz Müller. When Müller decided to move to ETH Zurich, Switzerland, Iken followed and she completed her PhD there in 1974. She subsequently took up a research position of her own at ETH Zurich and worked there for the rest of her scientific career.

== Research ==
Iken's PhD research into the connection between basal water pressure and glacier motion demonstrated for the first time that velocity variations at White Glacier (Axel Heiberg Island, Canadian Arctic) corresponded with variations in basal water pressure. This research was conducted using measurements of water pressure from moulins. She continued this work with further field experiments conducted at Unteraargletscher and Findel Glacier in the Swiss Alps. Eleven boreholes were drilled to the bed on Findel Glacier, which showed that surface velocity variations correlated with subglacial water pressure.

Following her research on alpine glaciers, Iken shifted her focus to Greenland to examine the dynamics of Jakobshavn Glacier, a fast-flowing glacier on the west coast. Several boreholes were drilled using a hot water drilling system to a depth of 1,600 m.

After this, Iken revisited her research on Findel Glacier to investigate the meltwater drainage system structure of the glacier and glacier sliding. She concluded that the glacier's subglacial hydrology network evolved over the course of the melt season, which influences glacier sliding and corresponding surface velocity.

In 2011 Iken was awarded the Seligman Crystal award from the International Glaciological Society for her contribution to the field of glaciology, noting that her findings have driven significant advances in glaciological research.

Iken died in Bremen on 10 December 2018.
