= Elizabeth Morris (glaciologist) =

British glaciologist

Elizabeth Mary Morris, OBE (born 7 September 1946), also known as Liz Morris, is a British glaciologist and Senior Associate at the Scott Polar Research Institute, University of Cambridge. She has been a visiting professor at the University of Reading since 1995. She was head of the ice and climate division at the British Antarctic Survey, from 1986 to 1999, and president of the International Glaciological Society, from 2002 to 2005.

== Career ==
Morris was among the first women scientists to work in Antarctica. Her research focused on accumulation and loss of ice and snow from the continent. This required measuring snowfall and ambient temperature. As a consequence, she went on several land crossings of the southern Antarctic Peninsula and the Filchner–Ronne Ice Shelf. As satellite mapping and measurement remote sensing replaced human recording, her measurements were important to ground truth satellite observations of the ice sheet. While she was head of the ice and climate division at the British Antarctic Survey from 1986-1999 the importance of Antarctic research to understanding the ozone hole and climate change became apparent and she led development of research directions to meet this need.

Morris was brought up in Chiswick, near London. Her parents taught English, but while they were studying at University of Bristol, they had become friends with Cecil Powell, a physicist. She was inspired to study physics, and also to follow her interest in mountains. She studied physics as an undergraduate and for her Ph.D. (awarded 1972) at University of Bristol modelled how ice flowed over mountains, supervised by John Nye. After working briefly in X-ray crystallography at University of Dundee, and then as a researcher at the University of East Anglia with Geoffrey Boulton, she joined the Institute of Hydrology for 11 years from 1975. She enjoyed fieldwork and was able to carry it out in mountains in Scotland, Norway, Austria and Canada. However, until the late 1980s only men were permitted at the UK station in Antarctica or distant arctic field sites.

Morris's next post was as head of the Ice and Climate Division at the British Antarctic Survey in 1986, and then its Research Activities Coordinator from 1999-2000. She was subsequently seconded to the Scott Polar Research Institute as their NERC Arctic Science Adviser from 2000- 2006, and was simultaneously a visiting professor at University of Reading from 1995 until 2010. She was able to do seven traverses of the Greenland ice sheet between 2004 and 2011 and made temperature and snow-depth measurements essential for calibrating satellite remote sensing. She continued to have academic appointments at University of Reading and the Scott Polar Research Institute, becoming an Emeritus Associate in 2016.

She was president the International Commission on Snow and Ice from 1995-2001 and president of the International Glaciological Society from 2002-05 the two major scientific societies involved in her area of science. She has also been extensively involved in the organisation of the latter society.

=== Awards ===
She was awarded an OBE in 2000 and the Polar Medal in 2003 for her services to Antarctic science. She was awarded the Richardson Medal of the International Glaciological Society in 2016. In 2015 she was awarded D.Sc. by University of Bristol.

In 2020 the Antarctic Place-names Committee announced that a glacier in Antarctica had been named after her.
