= Shields (Star Trek) =

Fictional technology from the Star Trek universe

- Star Trek franchise element
- First appearance: "Balance of Terror"; Star Trek; December 15, 1966
- Created by: (Series); Gene Roddenberry (Episode); Paul Schneider
- Genre: Science fiction

In-universe information
- Type: Defensive shields
- Function: Protects ships, space stations, and planets from damage by hazard or enemy attack.

In the Star Trek fictional universe, shields refer to a 23rd and 24th century technology that provides starships, space stations, and entire planets with limited protection against damage. They are sometimes referred to as deflectors, deflector shields, or (in Star Trek: The Original Series) screens. Types of shields include navigational deflectors.

== History ==
The term 'shields' first appears in the Star Trek episode "Balance of Terror", in which they were deployed, albeit to little effect, by a Federation outpost under attack from a Romulan Warbird. The first depicted use by a starship was in the Star Trek episode "Arena", in which the USS Enterprise raises its 'screens' after being attacked by an alien warship although the term 'shields' is not used in this episode. Shields are not mentioned during the earlier seasons of the Star Trek: Enterprise series, starships instead using "polarized hull plating" to make their hull more resistant to damage.

== Design ==
Like most technologies in the Star Trek fictional universe, the exact operation of shield technology is never precisely described. Characters discuss its existence and manipulation, while only superficially describing its exact physics, which result in a field being projected around a ship or other body, deflecting or dispersing projectiles and energy weapons. Shields are not shown unless struck, and are then often shown briefly for dramatic effect as a translucent bubble of energy.

Shields are said to be made of a screen of gravitons that can deflect beam and projectile weaponry.

In The Making of Star Trek, authors Gene Roddenberry and Stephen Whitfield write that shields are force fields similar in nature to the navigational deflector, while Mr. Scott's Guide to the Enterprise further states that shields on post-refit Constitution-class vessels - of which the USS Enterprise of Star Trek: The Original Series is an example - were generated by the subatomic scan and replication of an alloy known as diburnium-osmium, and then projected as a force field beyond a ship's hull along the shield grid. In "That Which Survives", the alloy of diburnium and osmium is stated to be the hardest alloy known to the Federation.

Shields can be weakened by attack, and are often shown to collapse after prolonged bombardment. Shields may be unable to repel certain types of weapons; the phased polaron weapons used by the Dominion - one of the primary antagonists of Star Trek: Deep Space Nine - are initially unhindered by the shields of Starfleet ships.

The USS Defiant, introduced in the third season of Deep Space Nine, was said to use ablative armor in addition to shields; this technology also appeared in the alternate time line of the early 25th century shown in the Star Trek: Voyager series finale "Endgame", where it withstood repeated assaults by Borg weaponry and tractor beams.

Another type of shield, the navigational deflector (also known just as the deflector, the deflector array, the deflector dish, the main deflector, the nav deflector, or the parabolic dish), was a force beam generator, usually a dish on the front of a ship, that was primarily used to deflect objects that might collide with the ship specially when traveling using Warp drive when even minute particles could cause serious damage.

== See also ==
- Force field (technology)
