= Catherine Ritz =

French Antarctic researcher

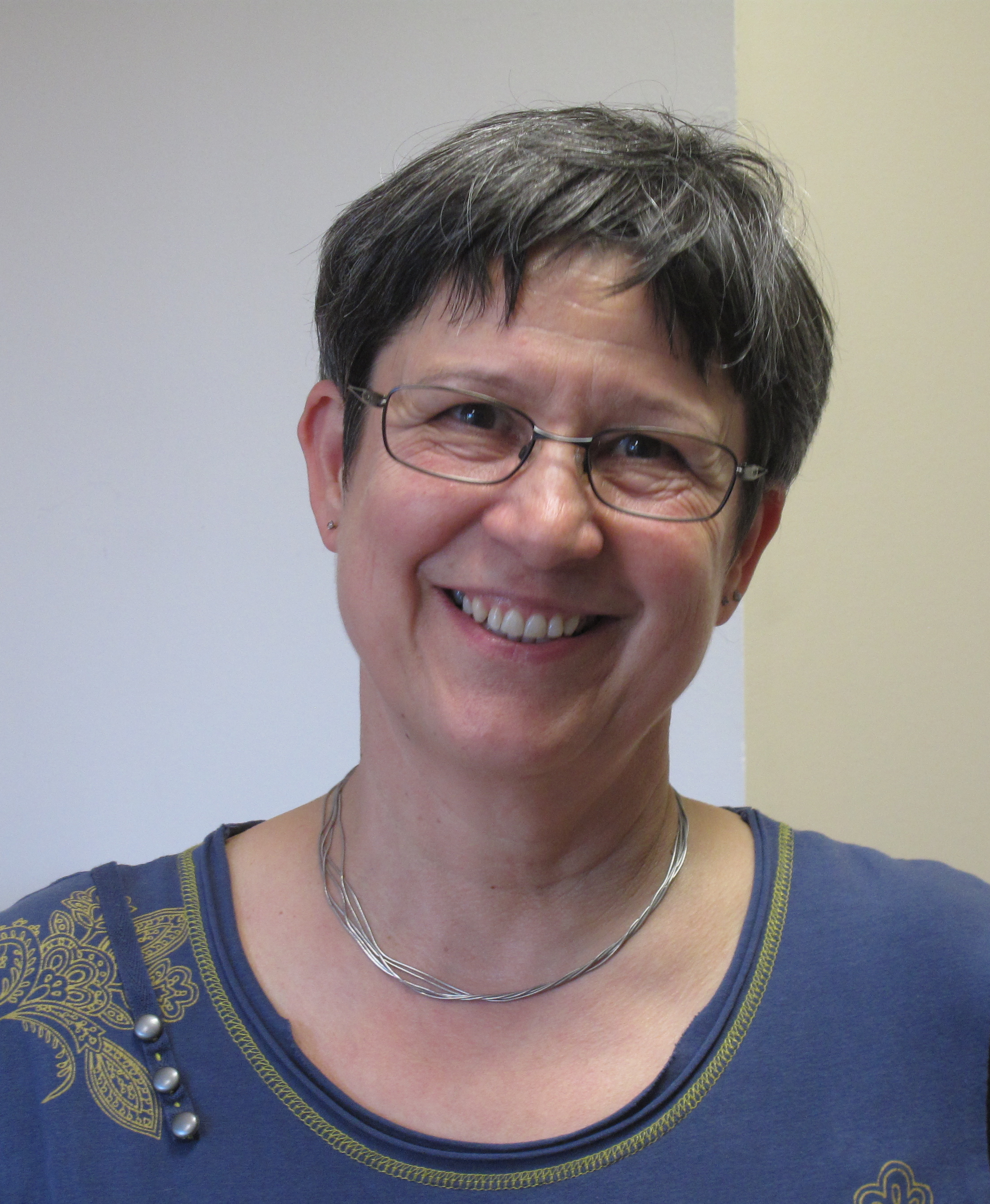
- Scientific career
- Fields: Ice Sheets; Climatology
- Institutions: Centre national de la recherche scientifique Université Grenoble Alpes

Catherine Ritz is a French Antarctic researcher, best known for her work on ice sheets and their impact on sea level rise.

== Early life and education ==
Catherine Ritz received her master's degree Maîtrise de Physique in physics in France in 1975. She conducted her PhD research leading toward the degree Thèse de 3ème cycle in 1980 from the University of Grenoble, and she received her Thèse de Doctorat d’Etat in 1992.

== Career and impact ==
Ritz is a climatologist and geographer known especially for her contributions to climate change research. She is a Senior Researcher for France's National Center for Scientific Research (CNRS) at the Laboratoire de Glaciologie et Geophysique de l’Environnement, and also is affiliated with the Université Grenoble Alpes. Her research involves modeling polar ice cap evolution; using 3D models to examine changes in the ice sheets and ice shelves of Antarctica and Greenland; ice drilling; and investigation of sub-glacial isostasy. She has published over 70 articles.

Among Ritz's more high-profile contributions is an article published in the journal Nature in December 2015. The article, based on research led by Ritz and Tamsin Edwards from The Open University, created models based on satellite data to examine the potential impact of Antarctic sea ice collapse on global sea levels. Using more comprehensive methods than those used in previous studies, the team found that the collapse of Antarctic ice sheets would have serious consequences for sea level rise (up to a half-meter by 2100 in a high-emissions scenario), but that the effects likely would not be as dramatic as other high-profile studies had predicted. The team found that the most likely outcome is a sea level rise 10 cm by 2100, assuming that greenhouse gases rise at a medium to high rate, and that it will be extremely unlikely for a rise of greater than 30 cm to occur.

Ritz also plays a prominent role in international efforts to monitor Antarctic ice and understand climate change. She is Chair of the Scientific Committee on Antarctic Research (SCAR) Ice Sheet Mass Balance and Sea Level Expert Group; member of the SCAR Antarctic Climate Change in the 21st Century Scientific Research Programme; and member of the International Advisory Board of Ice Sheet Modellers to the BRITICE-CHRONO team, which is studying marine-influenced ice sheet decay of the British-Irish ice sheet

Rirz was awarded the Seligman Crystal by the International Glaciological Society in 2020 for her work on ice sheet modelling and paleoclimate research.

== Selected writings ==
- Ritz, Catherine, Vincent Rommelaere, and Christophe Dumas. "Modeling the evolution of Antarctic ice sheet over the last 420,000 years: Implications for altitude changes in the Vostok region." Journal of Geophysical Research: Atmospheres 106.D23 (2001): 31943-31964.
- Augustin, Laurent, Carlo Barbante, Piers RF Barnes, Jean Marc Barnola, Matthias Bigler, Emiliano Castellano, Olivier Cattani, Catherin Ritz. "Eight glacial cycles from an Antarctic ice core." Nature 429, no. 6992 (2004): 623-628.
- Lemieux-Dudon, Bénédicte, Eric Blayo, Jean-Robert Petit, Claire Waelbroeck, Anders Svensson, Catherine Ritz, Jean-Marc Barnola, Bianca Maria Narcisi, and Frédéric Parrenin. "Consistent dating for Antarctic and Greenland ice cores." Quaternary Science Reviews 29, no. 1 (2010): 8-20.
- Parrenin, F., Remy, F., Ritz, C., Siegert, M. J., & Jouzel, J. (2004). New modeling of the Vostok ice flow line and implication for the glaciological chronology of the Vostok ice core. Journal of Geophysical Research: Atmospheres, 109(D20).
