= Mark Meier =

American glaciologist

Mark F. Meier (December 19, 1925 – November 25, 2012) was an American glaciologist who was considered a leading expert on the study of rising sea levels due to the melting of glaciers. Meier was the Director of the Institute of Arctic and Alpine Research (INSTAAR) from 1985 to 1994 and remained the institute's director emeritus until his death in 2012. He was also a professor of geological sciences at the University of Colorado Boulder.

Meier was born and raised in Iowa. He resided in Boulder, Colorado, since 1985.

In 1956, Meier founded the U.S. Geological Survey's department of glaciology. He obtained a doctorate in 1957 from the California Institute of Technology. Meier served as the director of the U.S. Geological Survey's Project Office of Glaciology in Tacoma, Washington, until he became the director of INSTAAR in 1985.

Meier was one of the first glaciologists to use remote sensing to study glaciers and rates of melting. He headed several studies of tidewater glacier dynamics in the U.S. state of Alaska. Meier organized the systematic measurement and assessment of glacier mass balance within North America to mark the International Geophysical Year and International Hydrological Decade, which was observed from 1965 to 1975.

His numerous recognitions and awards included the Seligman Crystal from the International Glaciological Society in 1985, the Robert E. Horton Medal in 1996, three medals from the USSR Academy of Sciences (now the Russian Academy of Sciences) and the United States Department of the Interior's Distinguished Service Award.

Meier died in Boulder, Colorado, on November 25, 2012, at the age of 86.
