= Ablation =

Removal of material from an object's surface

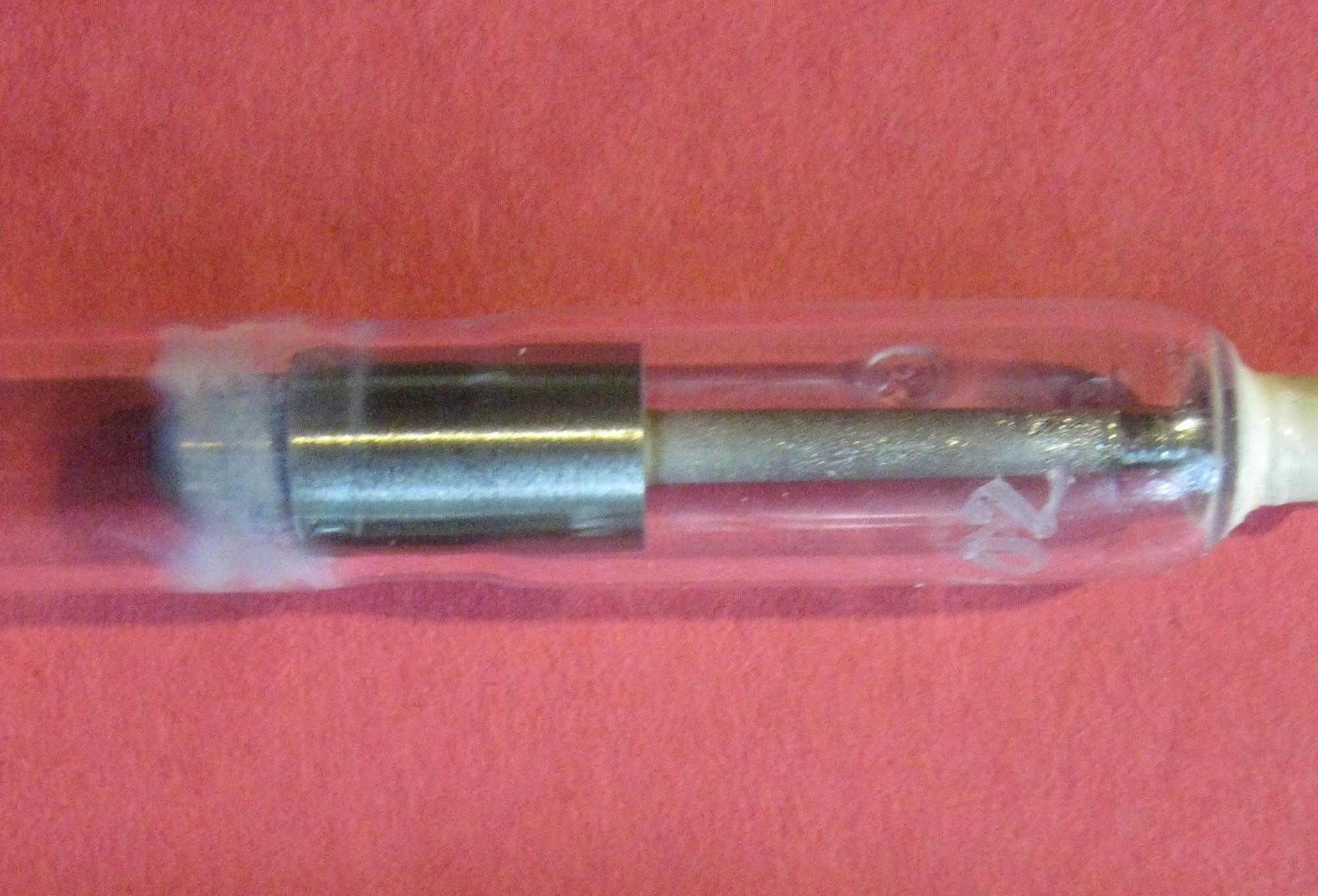
Ablation near the electrode in a flashtube. The high-energy electrical arc slowly erodes the glass, leaving a frosted appearance.

Ablation (Latin: ablatio – removal) is the removal or destruction of something from an object by vaporization, abrasion, erosive processes, or other means. The object may be fully ablated away. Examples of ablation as it is relevant to various industries are described below, including spacecraft material for ascent and atmospheric reentry, ice and snow in glaciology, biological tissues in medicine, and passive fire protection materials.

== Artificial intelligence ==
In artificial intelligence (AI), especially machine learning, ablation is the removal of a component of an AI system. The term is by analogy with biology: removal of components of an organism.

== Biology ==
Biological ablation is the removal of a biological structure or functionality.

Genetic ablation is another term for gene silencing, in which gene expression is abolished through the alteration or deletion of genetic sequence information. In cell ablation, individual cells in a population or culture are destroyed or removed. Both can be used as experimental tools, as in loss-of-function experiments.

== Medicine ==
In medicine, ablation is the removal of a part of biological tissue, usually by surgery. Surface ablation of the skin (dermabrasion, also called resurfacing because it induces regeneration) can be carried out by chemicals (chemoablation), by lasers (laser ablation), by freezing (cryoablation), or by electricity (fulguration). Its purpose is to remove skin spots, aged skin, wrinkles, thus rejuvenating it. Surface ablation is also employed in otolaryngology for several kinds of surgery, such as the one for snoring.

The term is also often used in the context of laser ablation, a process in which a laser breaks a material's molecular bonds. For a laser to ablate tissues, the power density or fluence must be high, otherwise thermocoagulation occurs, which is simply thermal vaporization of the tissues.

In cardiology, Radiofrequency ablation (RFA) can be used to treat a variety of cardiac arrhythmia such as supraventricular tachycardia, Wolff–Parkinson–White syndrome (WPW), ventricular tachycardia, and more recently as management of atrial fibrillation.

Rotablation is a type of arterial cleansing that consists of inserting a tiny, diamond-tipped, drill-like device into the affected artery to remove fatty deposits or plaque. The procedure is used in the treatment of coronary heart disease to restore blood flow.

Microwave ablation (MWA) is similar to RFA but at higher frequencies of electromagnetic radiation.

High-intensity focused ultrasound (HIFU) ablation removes tissue from within the body noninvasively.

Bone marrow ablation is a process whereby the human bone marrow cells are eliminated in preparation for a bone marrow transplant. This is performed using high-intensity chemotherapy and total body irradiation. As such, it has nothing to do with the vaporization techniques described in the rest of this article.

Ablation of brain tissue is used for treating certain neurological disorders, particularly Parkinson's disease, and sometimes for psychiatric disorders as well.

Recently, some researchers reported successful results with genetic ablation. In particular, genetic ablation is potentially a much more efficient method of removing unwanted cells, such as tumor cells, because large numbers of animals lacking specific cells could be generated. Genetically ablated lines can be maintained for a prolonged period of time and shared within the research community. Researchers at Columbia University report of reconstituted caspases combined from C. elegans and humans, which maintain a high degree of target specificity. The genetic ablation techniques described could prove useful in battling cancer.

== Electro-ablation ==
Electro-ablation, is a process that removes material from a metallic workpiece to reduce surface roughness.

Electro-ablation breaks through highly resistive oxide surfaces, such as those found on titanium and other exotic metals and alloys without melting the underlying non-oxidised metal or alloy. This allows very quick surface finishing

The process is capable of providing surface finishing for a wide range of exotic and widely used metals and alloys, including: titanium, stainless steel, niobium, chromium–cobalt, Inconel, aluminium, and a range of widely available steels and alloys.

Electro-ablation is very effective at achieving high levels of surface finishing in holes, valleys and hidden or internal surfaces on metallic workpieces (parts).

The process is particularly applicable to components produced by additive manufacturing process, such as 3D-printed metals. These components tend to be produced with roughness levels well above 5–20 micron. Electro-ablation can be used to quickly reduce the surface roughness to less than 0.8 micron, allowing the post-process to be used for volume production surface finishing.

== Glaciology ==
In glaciology and meteorology, ablation—the opposite of accumulation—refers to all processes that remove snow, ice, or water from a glacier or snowfield. Ablation refers to the melting of snow or ice that runs off the glacier, evaporation, sublimation, calving, or erosive removal of snow by wind. Air temperature is typically the dominant control of ablation, with precipitation exercising secondary control. In a temperate climate during ablation season, ablation rates typically average around 2 mm/h. Where solar radiation is the dominant cause of snow ablation (e.g., if air temperatures are low under clear skies), characteristic ablation textures such as suncups and penitentes may develop on the snow surface. Ablation can refer to mass loss from the upper surface of a glacier or ocean-driven melt and calving on the face of a glacier terminus.

Ablation can refer either to the processes removing ice and snow or to the quantity of ice and snow removed.

Debris-covered glaciers have also been shown to greatly impact the ablation process. There is a thin debris layer that can be located on the top of glaciers that intensifies the ablation process below the ice. The debris-covered parts of a glacier that is experiencing ablation are sectioned into three categories which include ice cliffs, ponds, and debris. These three sections allow scientists to measure the heat digested by the debris-covered area and is calculated. The calculations are dependent on the area and net absorbed heat amounts in regards to the entire debris-covered zones. These types of calculations are done to various glaciers to understand and analyze future patterns of melting.

Moraine (glacial debris) is moved by natural processes that allow for down-slope movement of materials on the glacier body. It is noted that if the slope of a glacier is too high then the debris will continue to move along the glacier to a further location. The sizes and locations of glaciers vary around the world, so depending on the climate and physical geography the varieties of debris can differ. The size and magnitude of the debris is dependent on the area of glacier and can vary from dust-size fragments to blocks as large as a house.

There have been many experiments done to demonstrate the effect of debris on the surface of glaciers. Yoshiyuki Fujii, a professor at the National Institute of Polar Research, designed an experiment that showed ablation rate was accelerated under a thin debris layer and was retarded under a thick one as compared with that of a natural snow surface. This science is significant due to the importance of long-term availability of water resources and assess glacier response to climate change. Natural resource availability is a major drive behind research conducted in regards to the ablation process and overall study of glaciers.

== Laser ablation ==
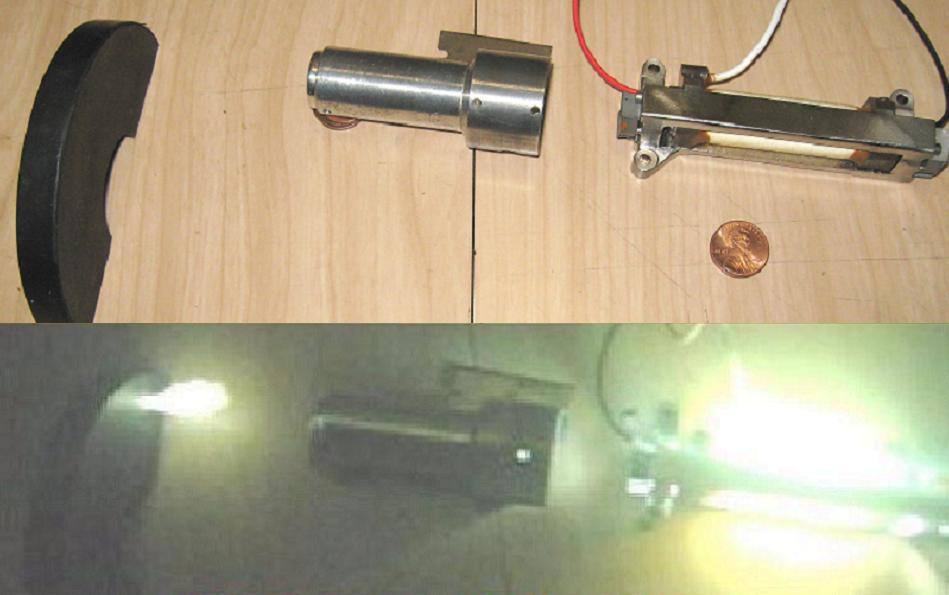
An Nd:YAG laser drills a hole through a block of nitrile. The intense burst of infrared radiation ablates the highly absorbing rubber, releasing an eruption of plasma.

Laser ablation is greatly affected by the nature of the material and its ability to absorb energy, therefore the wavelength of the ablation laser should have a minimum absorption depth. While these lasers can average a low power, they can offer peak intensity and fluence given by:

$$\begin{align}
\text{Intensity } (\mathrm{W}/\mathrm{cm}^2) &= \frac{\text{average power } (\mathrm{W})}{\text{focal spot area } (\mathrm{cm}^2)} \\[5pt]
\text{Peak intensity } (\mathrm{W}/\mathrm{cm}^2) &= \frac{\text{peak power } (\mathrm{W})}{\text{focal spot area } (\mathrm{cm}^2)} \\[5pt]
\text{Fluence } (\mathrm{J}/\mathrm{cm}^2) &= \frac{\text{laser pulse energy } (\mathrm{J})}{\text{focal spot area } (\mathrm{cm}^2)}
\end{align}$$

while the peak power is

$$\text{Peak power } (\mathrm{W}) = \frac{\text{pulse energy } (\mathrm{J})}{\text{pulse duration } (\mathrm{s})}$$

Surface ablation of the cornea for several types of eye refractive surgery is now common, using an excimer laser system (LASIK and LASEK). Since the cornea does not grow back, laser is used to remodel the cornea refractive properties to correct refraction errors, such as astigmatism, myopia, and hyperopia. Laser ablation is also used to remove part of the uterine wall in women with menstruation and adenomyosis problems in a process called endometrial ablation.

Researchers have demonstrated a successful technique for ablating subsurface tumors with minimal thermal damage to surrounding healthy tissue, by using a focused laser beam from an ultra-short pulse diode laser source.

== Marine surface coatings ==
Antifouling paints and other related coatings are routinely used to prevent the buildup of microorganisms and other animals, such as barnacles for the bottom hull surfaces of recreational, commercial and military sea vessels. Ablative paints are often utilized for this purpose to prevent the dilution or deactivation of the antifouling agent. Over time, the paint will slowly decompose in the water, exposing fresh antifouling compounds on the surface. Engineering the antifouling agents and the ablation rate can produce long-lived protection from the deleterious effects of biofouling.

== Passive fire protection ==
Firestopping and fireproofing products can be ablative in nature. This can mean endothermic materials, or merely materials that are sacrificial and become "spent" over time while exposed to fire, such as silicone firestop products. Given sufficient time under fire or heat conditions, these products char away, crumble, and disappear. The idea is to put enough of this material in the way of the fire that a level of fire-resistance rating can be maintained, as demonstrated in a fire test. Ablative materials usually have a large concentration of organic matter that is reduced by fire to ashes. In the case of silicone, organic rubber surrounds very finely divided silica dust (up to 380 m^{2} of combined surface area of all the dust particles per gram of this dust). When the organic rubber is exposed to fire, it burns to ash and leaves behind the silica dust with which the product started.

== Protoplanetary disk ablation ==
Protoplanetary disks are rotating circumstellar disks of dense gas and dust surrounding young, newly formed stars. Shortly after star formation, stars often have leftover surrounding material that is still gravitationally bound to them, forming primitive disks that orbit around the star's equator – not too dissimilarly from the rings of Saturn. This occurs because the decrease in the protostellar material's radius during formation increases angular momentum, which means that this remaining material gets whipped into a flattened circumstellar disk around the star. This circumstellar disk may eventually mature into what is referred to as a protoplanetary disk: a disk of gas, dust, ice and other materials from which planetary systems may form. In these disks, orbiting matter starts to accrete in the colder mid-plane of the disk from dust grains and ices sticking together. These small accretions grow from pebbles to rocks to early baby planets, called planetesimals, then protoplanets, and eventually, full planets.

As it is believed that massive stars may play a role in actively triggering star formation (by introducing gravitational instabilities amongst other factors), it is plausible that young, smaller stars with disks may be living relatively nearby to older, more massive stars. This has already been confirmed through observations to be the case in certain clusters, e.g. in the Trapezium cluster. Since massive stars tend to collapse through supernovae at the end of their lives, research is now investigating what role the shockwave of such an explosion, and the resulting supernova remnant (SNR), would play if it occurred in the line of fire of a protoplanetary disk. According to computationally modelled simulations, a SNR striking a protoplanetary disk would result in significant ablation of the disk, and this ablation would strip a significant amount of protoplanetary material from the disk – but not necessarily destroy the disk entirely. This is an important point because a disk that survives such an interaction with sufficient material leftover to form a planetary system may inherit an altered disk chemistry from the SNR, which could have effects on the planetary systems that later form.

== Spaceflight ==
In spacecraft design, ablation is used to both cool and protect mechanical parts and/or payloads that would otherwise be damaged by extremely high temperatures. Two principal applications are heat shields for spacecraft entering a planetary atmosphere from space and cooling of rocket engine nozzles. Examples include the Apollo Command Module that protected astronauts from the heat of atmospheric reentry and the Kestrel second stage rocket engine designed for exclusive use in an environment of space vacuum since no heat convection is possible.

In a basic sense, ablative material is designed so that instead of heat being transmitted into the structure of the spacecraft, only the outer surface of the material bears the majority of the heating effect. Ceramics are used for this purpose. The outer surface chars and burns away – but quite slowly, only gradually exposing new fresh protective material beneath. The heat is carried away from the spacecraft by the gases generated by the ablative process, and never penetrates the surface material, so the metallic and other sensitive structures they protect, remain at a safe temperature. As the surface burns and disperses into space, the remaining solid material continues to insulate the craft from ongoing heat and superheated gases. The thickness of the ablative layer is calculated to be sufficient to survive the heat it will encounter on its mission.

There is an entire branch of spaceflight research involving the search for new fireproofing materials to achieve the best ablative performance; this function is critical to protect the spacecraft occupants and payload from otherwise excessive heat loading. The same technology is used in some passive fire protection applications, in some cases by the same vendors, who offer different versions of these fireproofing products, some for aerospace and some for structural fire protection.

== See also ==
- Electrical arc flash burns
- Ablative armor
