= Gerald Seligman =

British glaciologist

Gerald Seligman (26 March 1886 – 21 February 1973) was the founder of the International Glaciological Society and the Journal of Glaciology. He was born in London, educated at Harrow, and studied at Trinity Hall, Cambridge. He was the first president of the Association for the study of Snow and Ice, founded in 1936, which was renamed the British Glaciological Society after the war; the "British" was dropped in 1962, and the following year Seligman resigned his post as president. He launched the Journal of Glaciology in the late 1940s and was on its original editorial board, remaining as editor until 1968. He received the Victoria Medal of the Royal Geographical Society in 1959. The Seligman Crystal award, given by the Glaciological Society, is named in his honour.

== See also ==
- Seligman Inlet

== Sources ==
- Glen, J.W. (1973). "Obituary: Gerald Seligman 1886-1973" (PDF). Journal of Glaciology. 12 (65): 169–171. Bibcode:1973JGlac..12..169G. doi:10.1017/S0022143000032019.
