= Seligman Crystal =

Award from the International Glaciological Society

The Seligman Crystal is an award of the International Glaciological Society.

The prize is "awarded from time to time to one who has made an outstanding scientific contribution to glaciology so that the subject is now enriched" and named after Gerald Seligman.

== Recipients ==
Source: International Glaciological Society

- Gerald Seligman (1963)
- H. Bader (1967)
- J.F. Nye (1969)
- John W. Glen (1972)
- B. L. Hansen (1972)
- S. Evans (1974)
- Willi Dansgaard (1976)
- W. B. Kamb (1977)
- Marcel de Quervain (1982)
- William Osgood Field, Jr (1983)
- Johannes Weertman (1983)
- Mark F. Meier (1985)
- Gordon de Quetteville Robin (1986)
- Hans Oeschger (1989)
- W. F. Weeks (1989)
- Charles R. Bentley (1990)
- Akira Higashi (1990)
- Hans Röthlisberger (1992)
- Louis Lliboutry (1993)
- Anthony J. Gow (1995)
- William F. Budd (1996)
- Sigfús J. Johnsen (1997)
- Claude Lorius (1998)
- Charles F. Raymond (1999)
- S.C. Colbeck (2000)
- Geoffrey S. Boulton (2001)
- Garry K. C. Clarke (2001)
- Kolumban Hutter (2003)
- Richard Alley (2005)
- Lonnie G. Thompson (2007)
- Paul A. Mayewski (2009)
- Almut Iken (2011)
- David E. Sugden (2012)
- Paul Duval (2013)
- Richard C.A. Hindmarsh (2019)
- Douglas R. MacAyeal (2019)
- Andrew C. Fowler (2020)
- Catherine Ritz (2020)
- Adrian Jenkins (2021)
- Dorthe Dahl-Jensen (2022)
- Douglas I. Benn (2023)
- Yao Tandong (2023)
- Helen A. Fricker (2024)
- Sridhar Anandakrishnan (2024)
- Daniel Feltham (2025)

== See also ==
- List of earth sciences awards
- List of geology awards
- Prizes named after people
