= Geoffrey Boulton =

British geologist

Professor Geoffrey Boulton OBE FRS FRSE MAE

Regius Professor of Geology and Mineralogy, University of Edinburgh
- In office 1986–2008

Personal details
- Born: Geoffrey Stewart Boulton; 28 November 1940 (age 85)

Geoffrey Stewart Boulton (born 28 November 1940) is a British geoscientist, and Regius Professor Emeritus of the University of Edinburgh. He was awarded the 2006 Lyell Medal, by the Geological Society. He was awarded the 2011 James Croll Medal. He was awarded the Seligman Crystal by the International Glaciological Society in 2001. Between 2007 and 2011 he was General Secretary of the Royal Society of Edinburgh, of which he has been a Fellow since 1989. He was elected to membership of the Academia Europaea in 2022

== Life ==
A member of the Independent Climate Change Email Review Commission, and held the role of lecturer at the University of East Anglia from 1968 to 1986.
