= Julie Palais =

American glaciologist (born 1956)

Julie Michelle Palais
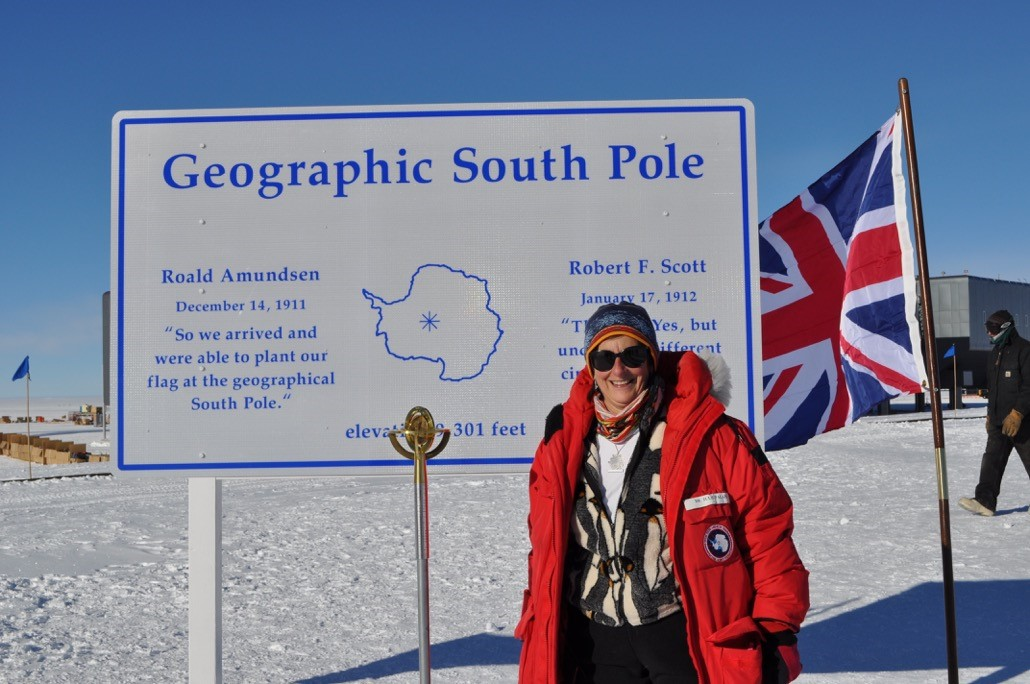
- Julie Michelle Palais at the South Pole

Julie Michelle Palais is an American polar glaciologist who has made significant contributions to climate change research studying volcanic fallout in ice cores from both Greenland and Antarctica. For many years, starting in 1990, she played a pivotal role working at the National Science Foundation (NSF) as Program Director of the Antarctic Glaciology Program in the Division of Polar Programs, including many trips to both North and South Polar regions. Both the Palais Glacier and Palais Bluff in Antarctica were named in her honor and she has received many further recognitions for her distinguished career.

== Career and impact ==
For over 26 years Palais directed polar glaciology research as Program Director for the Division of Polar Programs Antarctic Glaciology Program at NSF.

== Encore career ==
She continued her work looking at the animal cruelty data in the National Incident-Based Reporting System (NIBRS) of the FBI. The analyses included not only state to state differences in the numbers of incidents reported but also the demographics of offenders, and the other criminal offenses co-occurring along with the incidents of animal cruelty. In addition, she noted the location, time of day and monthly variations of incidents of animal cruelty. She published her findings in four magazine articles in 2020, including an article in Public Management (International City/County Management Association); an article in Animal Care & Control Today (National Animal Care & Control Association), an article in Sheriff & Deputy Magazine (National Sheriff's Association) and one in Police Chief Magazine (International Association of Chief's of Police). Palais continues to do scholarly research on publishing a paper in the journal Social Sciences on the trends in animal cruelty from law enforcement agencies and how that relates to the potential for other crimes.

In August 2021, Palais (under her pen name Julu) published (Vajra Publications, Kathmandu, Nepal) the bilingual (English-Nepali) children’s book, “Sathi: The Street Dog from Kathmandu, Nepal”.

== Awards and honors ==
Palais Glacier and Palais Bluff are two features in Antarctica named in her honor by the Advisory Committee on Antarctic Names (US-ACAN), Palais Glacier in 1995, and Palais Bluff in 2000.

In 2007, the Explorers Club named her co-recipient of the Lowell Thomas Award for her contributions to breakthroughs in glaciology and climate science.

In 2017, the International Glaciological Society awarded Palais the Richardson Medal for 'For insightful and steadfast service to the U.S. and international glaciological and ice core science communities by enabling discoveries that have impacted the course of climate science and enlightened understanding of the important role of glaciology and the polar regions in global climate change'.

In 2019, the University of New Hampshire (UNH) awarded Palais an honorary degree at its May 18 Commencement ceremony: "...for her contributions to climate change research, studying volcanic fallout in ice cores from both Greenland and Antarctica."
