= Suncup (snow) =

Bowl-shaped open depressions into a snow surface

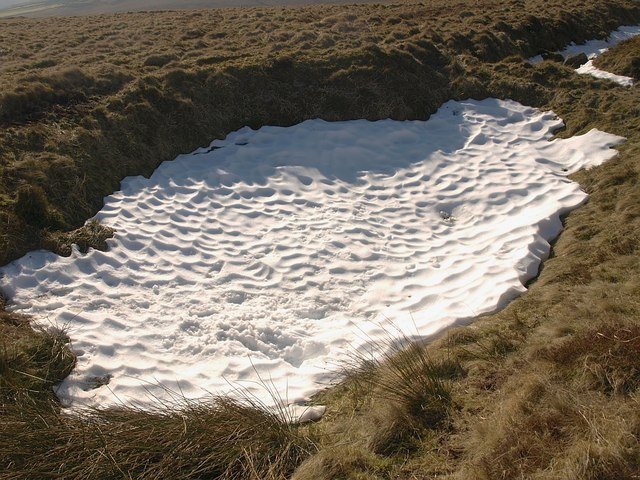
Suncups on a snow patch near Gibby Beam, UK.

Suncups are bowl-shaped open depressions into a snow surface, normally wider than they are deep. They form closely packed, honeycomb, often hexagonal patterns with sharp narrow ridges separating smoothly concave hollows. For a given set of suncups, the hollows are normally all around the same size, meaning that the pattern is quasi-periodic on 20–80 cm scales. The depressions are typically 2–50 cm deep.

Suncups form during the ablation (melting away) of snowy surfaces. It is thought they can form in a number of different ways. These include melting of clean snow by incident solar radiation in bright sunny conditions, but also during melting away of dirty snow under windy or overcast conditions, during which particles in the snow accumulate on the crests between hollows, insulating them.

== See also ==
- Penitente (snow formation), another snow ablation texture
