= Stan Paterson =

British glaciologist (1924-2013)

- Born: William Stanley Bryce Paterson; 20 May 1924; Edinburgh, United Kingdom
- Died: 8 October 2013 (aged 89); Campbell River, Vancouver Island, Canada
- Education: University of Edinburgh
- Occupation: Glaciologist

William Stanley Bryce (Stan) Paterson (20 May 1924 – 8 October 2013) was a leading British glaciologist. He mined glacial cores which then provided climate data for the world's last 100,000 years.

== Academic career ==
In 1953, Paterson joined the British North Greenland Expedition as a surveyor.

In 1956, Paterson joined an expedition to South Georgia where he was involved in the first survey of the island's mountain ranges.

In 1957, Paterson emigrated for work to Montreal, Quebec, Canada, before beginning his studies for a PhD in glaciology at the University of British Columbia the following year.

In 1958, Paterson joined a Scottish East Greenland Expedition to measure the flow rate of a coastal glacier.

Paterson completed his PhD in 1962 and was then appointed to the Canadian Polar Continental Shelf Project (PCSP) as a glaciologist.

For the next few decades, Paterson, and a team of glaciologists he put together, spent time in the Canadian Arctic drilling ice cores and carrying out investigations on the ice caps. Each ice core was analysed in terms of its structure and chemistry and provided pioneering data on the Earth's climate reaching back 100,000 years into history. Some of this data was then used by the Intergovernmental Panel on Climate Change.

Also during his time at the PSCP, in 1969, Paterson wrote a key text in the field of glaciology – The Physics of Glaciers, of which a fourth edition was published in 2010 and it remains a key work in the field. Paterson left the PCSP in 1980, and continued his interests of writing and teaching with sabbaticals in Copenhagen, Seattle, Melbourne and China.

The work Paterson carried out was also relevant to the field of planetary science, and in 1992 he was appointed as co-convenor of the NASA and Lunar and Planetary Institute (LPI) joint Workshop on The Polar Regions of Mars: Geology, Glaciology, and Climate History.

In 2012, the International Glaciological Society awarded Paterson the Richardson Medal for Outstanding Services to Glaciology.

== Biography ==
Paterson was born in Edinburgh on 20 May 1924. He went to school at George Watson's College, then studied Mathematics and Physics at the University of Edinburgh, where he graduated in 1949. His experience of the University mountaineering club triggered his lifelong passion for climbing.

Paterson died on 8 October 2013, at Campbell River, Vancouver Island, Canada.
