= Richard Alley =

American geologist and academic (born 1957)

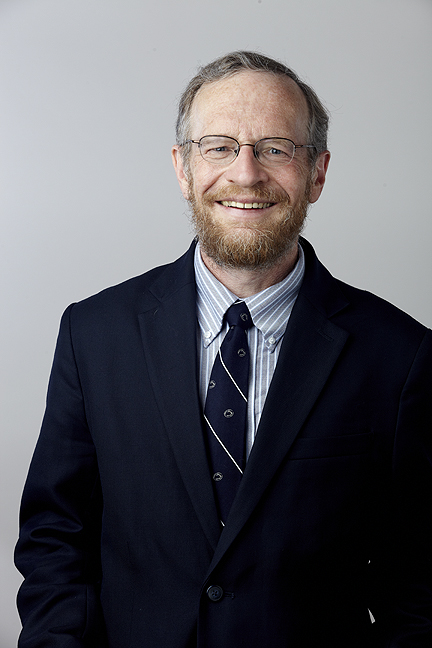
- Richard Alley in 2014, portrait via the Royal Society
- Born: Richard Blane Alley; 18 August 1957 (age 69)
- Education: Ohio State University; University of Wisconsin–Madison (PhD)
- Known for: Abrupt climate change; Glaciology; Ice sheets
- Awards: ForMemRS 2014 BBVA Foundation Frontiers of Knowledge Award; Heinz Award with special focus on the Environment (2011); Roger Revelle Medal (2007); AGU Fellow (2000)
- Scientific career
- Workplaces: Pennsylvania State University
- Thesis: Transformations in polar firn (1987)
- Doctoral advisor: Charles R. Bentley
- Website: www.geosc.psu.edu/academic-faculty/alley-richard

Richard Blane Alley (born 18 August 1957) is an American geologist and Evan Pugh Professor of Geosciences at Pennsylvania State University. He has authored more than 240 refereed scientific publications about the relationships between Earth's cryosphere and global climate change, and is recognized by the Institute for Scientific Information as a Highly Cited Researcher.

== Education ==
Alley was educated at the geology departments of Ohio State University and University of Wisconsin–Madison, where he was awarded a PhD in 1987.

== Research and career ==
In 1999, Alley was invited to testify about climate change by Vice President Al Gore after his research with Greenland ice cores indicated that the last Ice Age ended abruptly and violently rather than as a result of gradual change. He appeared again before the U.S. Senate Committee on Commerce, Science, and Transportation in 2003; before the U.S. House Committee on Science and Technology in 2007; and in 2010.

Alley's 2007 testimony was due to his role as a lead author of "Chapter 4: Observations: Changes in Snow, Ice and Frozen Ground" for the Fourth Assessment Report of the Intergovernmental Panel on Climate Change (IPCC). He has participated in the joint UN/WMO panel since 1992, having been a contributing author to both the second and third IPCC assessment reports.

Alley has written several papers in the journals Nature and Science, and chaired the National Research Council on Abrupt Climate Change. In 2000, he published the book The Two-Mile Time Machine: Ice Cores, Abrupt Climate Change, and Our Future. He has appeared in numerous climate change-related television documentaries and has given many public presentations and media interviews about the subject.

Alley gave the Bjerknes lecture to the 2009 American Geophysical Union meeting titled "The biggest control knob- Carbon Dioxide in Earth's climate history". A video of the presentation is available (also available on YouTube).

His more recent work has examined ice sheets and the factors that affect "calving", the process by which ice sheets break up.

== Awards and honors ==
Alley was awarded the Seligman Crystal in 2005 "for his prodigious contribution to our understanding of the stability of the ice sheets and glaciers of Antarctica and Greenland, and of erosion and sedimentation by this moving ice." Alley is one of several Penn State earth scientists who are contributors to the United Nations Intergovernmental Panel on Climate Change, which shared the 2007 Nobel Peace Prize with Al Gore.

In 2005 he was also the first recipient of the Louis Agassiz Medal for his "outstanding and sustained contribution to glaciology and for his effective communication of important scientific issues in the public policy arena". His award citation stated "He is imaginative, sharp and humorous, and remains a thorn in the backside of the Bush administration."

In 2008 Alley was elected to the National Academy of Sciences. He was elected a Fellow of the American Academy of Arts and Sciences in 2010.

In 2011, he received the 17th Annual Heinz Award with a special focus on the environment.

On 28 April 2014 the National Center for Science Education announced that its first annual Friend of the Planet award had been presented to Alley and Michael E. Mann. He was elected a Foreign Member of the Royal Society (ForMemRS) in the same year, his nomination reads:

Richard Alley has made outstanding contributions to the study of ice, its interactions with the landscape and its link to climate. He has made important advances in topics as diverse as grain-scale physics controlling ice deformation, the role and nature of ice streams, and processes at the bed of the ice sheet. His work synthesised the evidence that abrupt climate changes occurred in the past, and drove hypotheses about their cause and the role of ice on ocean circulation. Alley is also an outstanding science communicator, whose skill and enthusiasm has influenced both policymakers and large public audiences.

He won the 2014 BBVA Foundation Frontiers of Knowledge Award in Climate Change category for his “pioneering research” into the “mechanics of ice and its implications for abrupt climate change,” in the words of the jury's citation. He is the 2017 recipient of the Wollaston Medal, which is the highest award given by the Geological Society of London. It is reserved for geologists who have made a significant impact on the field through a substantial body of impactful research.

In 2018, Alley was named the recipient of the Roy Chapman Andrews Society Distinguished Explorer Award. Alley was chosen primarily because of his discoveries advancing the understanding of rapid climate change and the stability of polar climates.

In January 2025, President Biden awarded Alley the National Medal of Science.

== Television series ==
In addition to his research, Alley has made several appearances on television. On Sunday, April 10, 2011, PBS debuted a special program on climate change, entitled EARTH: The Operators’ Manual, hosted by Alley. The program's aim was to present an objective, accessible assessment of the Earth's problems and possible solutions, with the stated intention of leaving viewers informed, energized and optimistic. The series continued through 2012 on PBS and affiliates. The series is accompanied by a book of the same name, also by Richard Alley. It was published on April 18, 2011. He has also appeared in episodes of the History Channel series Mega Disasters.
