= Bethan Davies (scientist) =

British glaciologist

- Born: Bethan Joan Davies
- Citizenship: United Kingdom
- Education: University of Nottingham (BA); Royal Holloway, University of London (MSc); Durham University (PhD)
- Awards: Richardson Medal (2024)
- Scientific career
- Fields: Glaciology
- Workplaces: Newcastle University
- Thesis: British and Fennoscandian Ice-Sheet Interactions During the Quaternary (2009)
- Website: https://www.antarcticglaciers.org/

Bethan Joan Davies is a British glaciologist and Professor of Glaciology at Newcastle University.

== Education ==
Davies studied geography at the University of Nottingham, graduating with a BA in 2001. She completed an MSc in Quaternary Science at Royal Holloway, University of London in 2004. She was awarded her PhD in Quaternary Geology from Durham University in 2009.

== Career ==
Davies joined Newcastle University in 2022 as Senior Lecturer in Glaciology. She was appointed to the chair in Glaciology in 2024. Her main research interest is the interaction between glaciers and climate over multiple timescales.

She became an editor of Quaternary Science Reviews in 2025.

== Awards and honours ==
In 2024, Davies received the Richardson Medal from the International Glaciological Society for her contributions to glaciology.

== Selected publications ==
=== Journal articles ===
- Davies, Bethan J.; Glasser, Neil F. (2012). "Accelerating shrinkage of Patagonian glaciers from the Little Ice Age (~AD 1870) to 2011". Journal of Glaciology. 58 (212): 1063–1084. Bibcode:2012JGlac..58.1063D. doi:10.3189/2012JoG12J026.
- ———; Darvill, Christopher M.; Lovell, Harold; et al. (2020). "The evolution of the Patagonian Ice Sheet from 35 ka to the present day (PATICE)". Earth-Science Reviews. 204 103152. Bibcode:2020ESRv..20403152D. doi:10.1016/j.earscirev.2020.103152. hdl:10871/122637.
- ———; McNabb, Robert; Bendle, Jacob; et al. (2024). "Accelerating glacier volume loss on Juneau Icefield driven by hypsometry and melt-accelerating feedbacks". Nature Communications. 15 (1) 5099. Bibcode:2024NatCo..15.5099D. doi:10.1038/s41467-024-49269-y. PMC 11220083. PMID 38956392.
