= Ablative armor =

Armor which prevents damage through the process of ablation

Ablative armor is armor which prevents damage through the process of ablation, the removal of material from the surface of an object by vaporization, chipping, or other erosive processes. In contemporary spacecraft, ablative plating is most frequently seen as an ablative heat shield for a vehicle that must enter atmosphere from orbit, such as on nuclear warheads, or space vehicles like the Mars Pathfinder probe. A large amount of developmental usage was on the early 1960s rocket powered X-15 crewed aircraft traveling at hypersonic speeds in excess of Mach 6.5 (roughly 5,000 mph). The idea is also commonly encountered in science fiction. In the 2000s, the concept saw widespread usage in robot combat as a method of reducing impact energy transfer to vital components.

== Uses in fiction ==
=== Star Trek ===
Ablative hull armor appears in the Star Trek universe. Having been introduced in the year 2371 of Star Trek's fictional future timeline, it features on starships including the USS Defiant, USS Prometheus, and an upgraded USS Voyager.

The Star Trek: Deep Space Nine Technical Manual explains that ablative armor works in two stages: When the shields are hit by an energy or particle weapon, thermal energy from the ship is dissipated across the hull. The boil-off rate creates a particle cloud that is dense enough to disperse the incoming beam's energy.

Regenerative ablative armor is powered armor that can restore the ablated material.

=== DarkSpace ===
In the online game DarkSpace, ablative armor is utilized to counter projectile-based damage while making the ship more vulnerable to lasers and energy-based weapons.

=== Gundam ===
In the Universal Century time line of the Gundam series, ablative coatings are used to minimize the effect of beam weapons, called beam resistive coating and a later improved version, Anti-beam coating.

In the Cosmic Era time line, the ablative armor concept is applied in similar capacity to the anti-beam coating and laminated armor technologies utilised by mobile suits as a form of protection against beam and laser weaponry. Selected spacecraft are also able to deploy ablative gel for high-velocity atmospheric reentries.

In the Anno Domini time line, the Earth's three space elevators are covered by ablative armor plates to protect their structures from damage. When one of the elevators is partially destroyed, purging these plates require the technical crew to jettison the counterweight at the orbital end in order to avoid the now-unbalanced elevator's complete collapse.

=== EVE Online ===
In the online game EVE Online, ablative armor plating is utilized as a secondary defensive layer that protects the relatively fragile internal systems. Depending on the ship's loadout configuration, a ship can continuously repair incoming damage on the armor, fit additional armor plates to sustain large amounts of damage in the short term, or remotely repair friendly ships' armor using specialized modules. The rate at which the armor gets depleted depends on the types of damage incurred to the armor and the armor's resistance value against each particular type of damage.

Armor plating is usually considered strong against electromagnetic and thermal damage, and weak against kinetic energy penetrators and bombardment of subatomic particles (explosive), although a few exceptions exist.

=== Mass Effect ===
In the console and PC game Mass Effect there are several variants of armor for all species referred to as ablative.

=== Warhammer 40000 ===
In the tabletop RPG Inquisitor, ablative armor may be layered on top of other armor. If the ablative armor is struck, it is destroyed (after the damage caused by the attack is reduced accordingly). Ablative armor may have additional properties such as added resistance to heat- or laser-based weaponry; if special ablative armor is destroyed, it loses those additional properties. Unlike other types of armor in-game, ablative armor is quite cheap to purchase (since it is so easily destroyed).

In the tabletop wargame some armored vehicles, like the Astra Militarum's Sentinel walker, have ablative plating to help reduce damage to the pilot and survive the high power weaponry often faced in the game's setting.

=== Battle Pirates ===
In Battle Pirates, ablative armor is used to increase resistance to explosive damage on a ship.

=== Traveller ===
In the table top role playing game Traveller, ablative armor (referred to as Ablat) is an equipment option for characters to protect them from laser fire or other energy weapons. In the second edition of Traveller published by Game Designers's Workshop in 1981, Ablat is described as an "Ablative (vaporizing anti-laser) jacket" available for 75 credits on Tech Level 9+ worlds. The 2016 Mongoose Traveller Central Supply Catalog also includes Ablat with the same cost and technology requirement.
