= Hans Oerlemans =

Johannes Oerlemans
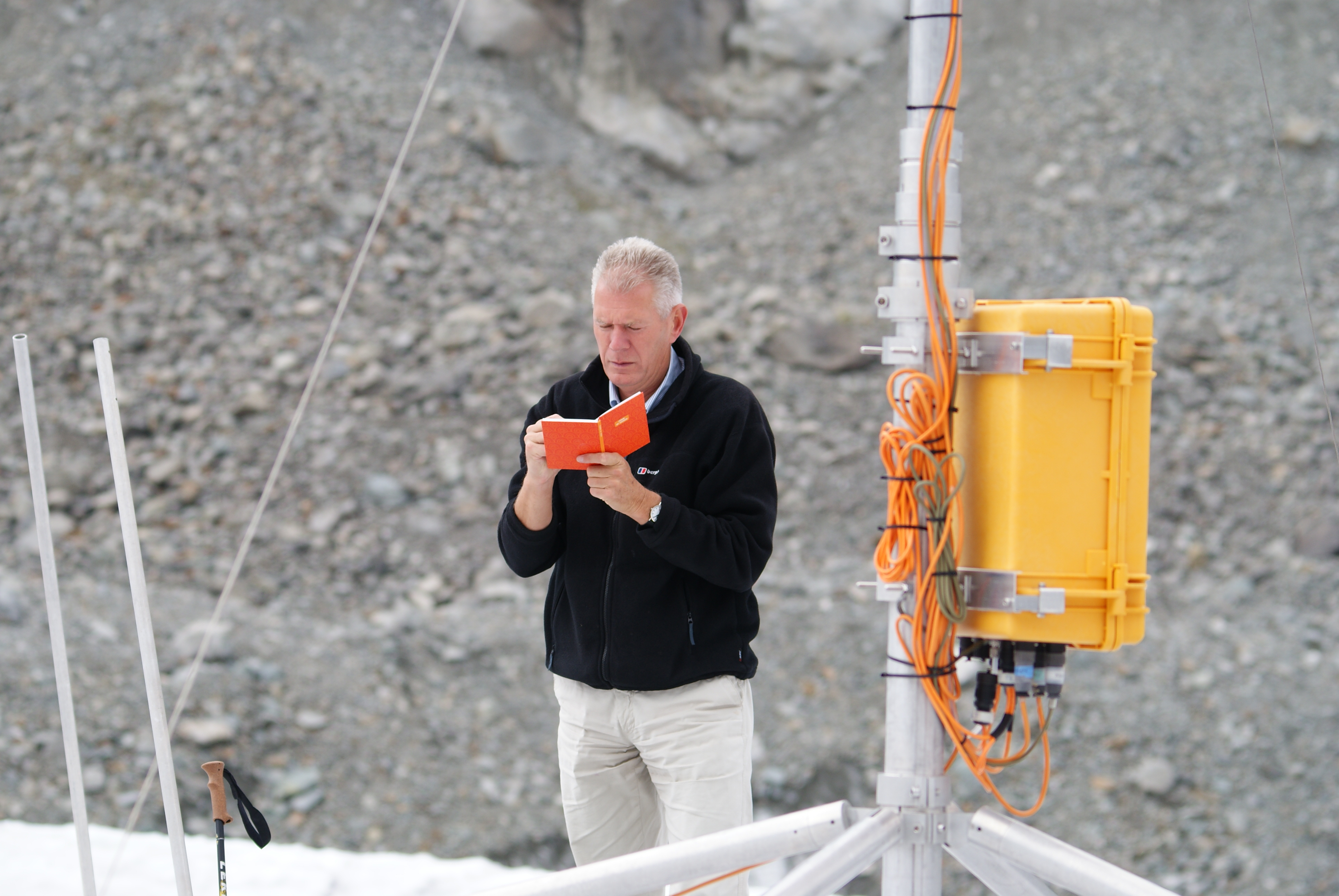
- Born: October 8, 1950 (age 74); Eethen, Netherlands
- Education: Utrecht University
- Awards: Spinoza Prize (2001); Louis Agassiz Medal from the European Geosciences Union (2008); Balzan Prize (2022)
- Scientific career
- Fields: Climatology
- Institutions: Utrecht University
- Thesis: Some model studies on the ice-age problem (1980)
- Doctoral advisor: C.J.E. Schuurmans

Johannes "Hans" Oerlemans (born October 8, 1950 in Eethen) is a Dutch climatologist specialized in glaciology and sea level. He has been a professor of meteorology in the Faculty of Physics and Astronomy at Utrecht University since 1989.

He was elected a member of the Royal Netherlands Academy of Arts and Sciences in 1994. In 2001 he won the Spinoza Prize. In 2010 he was made a Knight of the Order of the Netherlands Lion. In 2022 he was awarded the Balzan Prize for Glaciation and Ice Sheet Dynamics together with Dorthe Dahl-Jensen.
