= Penitente (snow formation) =

Field of regularly spaced ice formations formed by sublimation at high altitudes

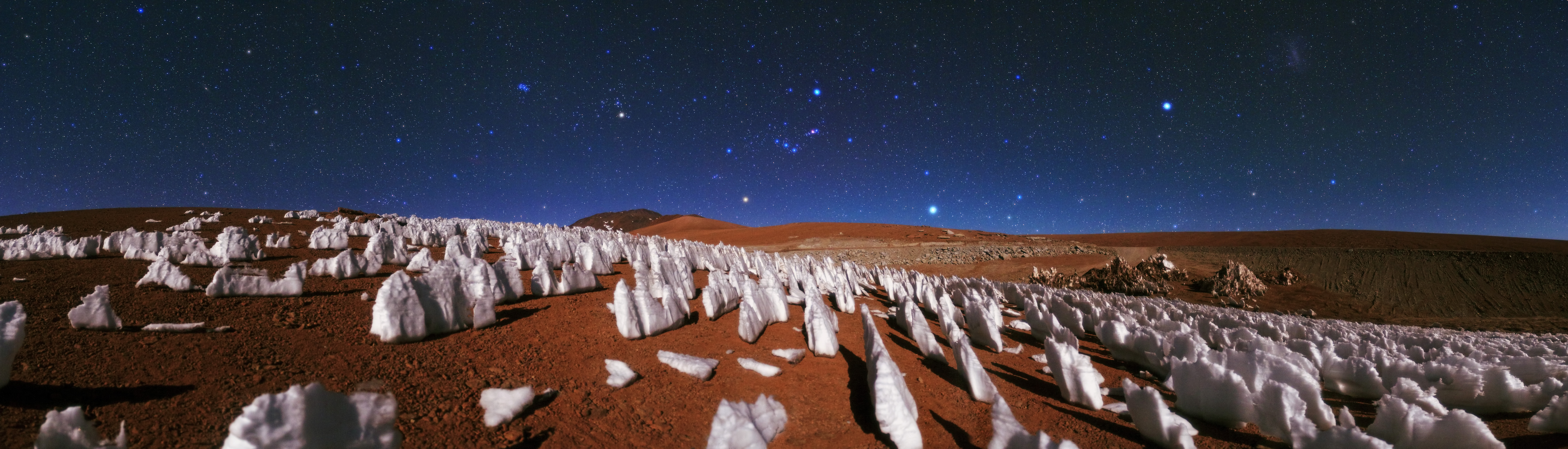
Penitentes under the night sky of the Atacama Desert

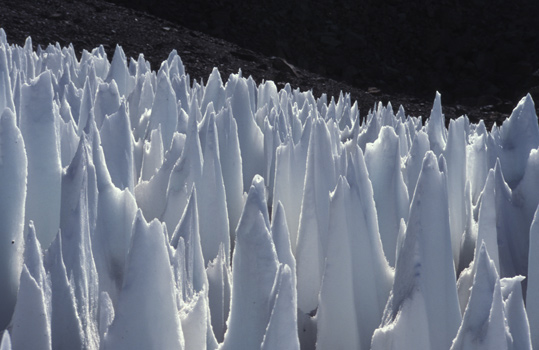
Field of penitentes (1.5–2 metres or 5–7 feet high); upper Rio Blanco, Central Andes of Argentina

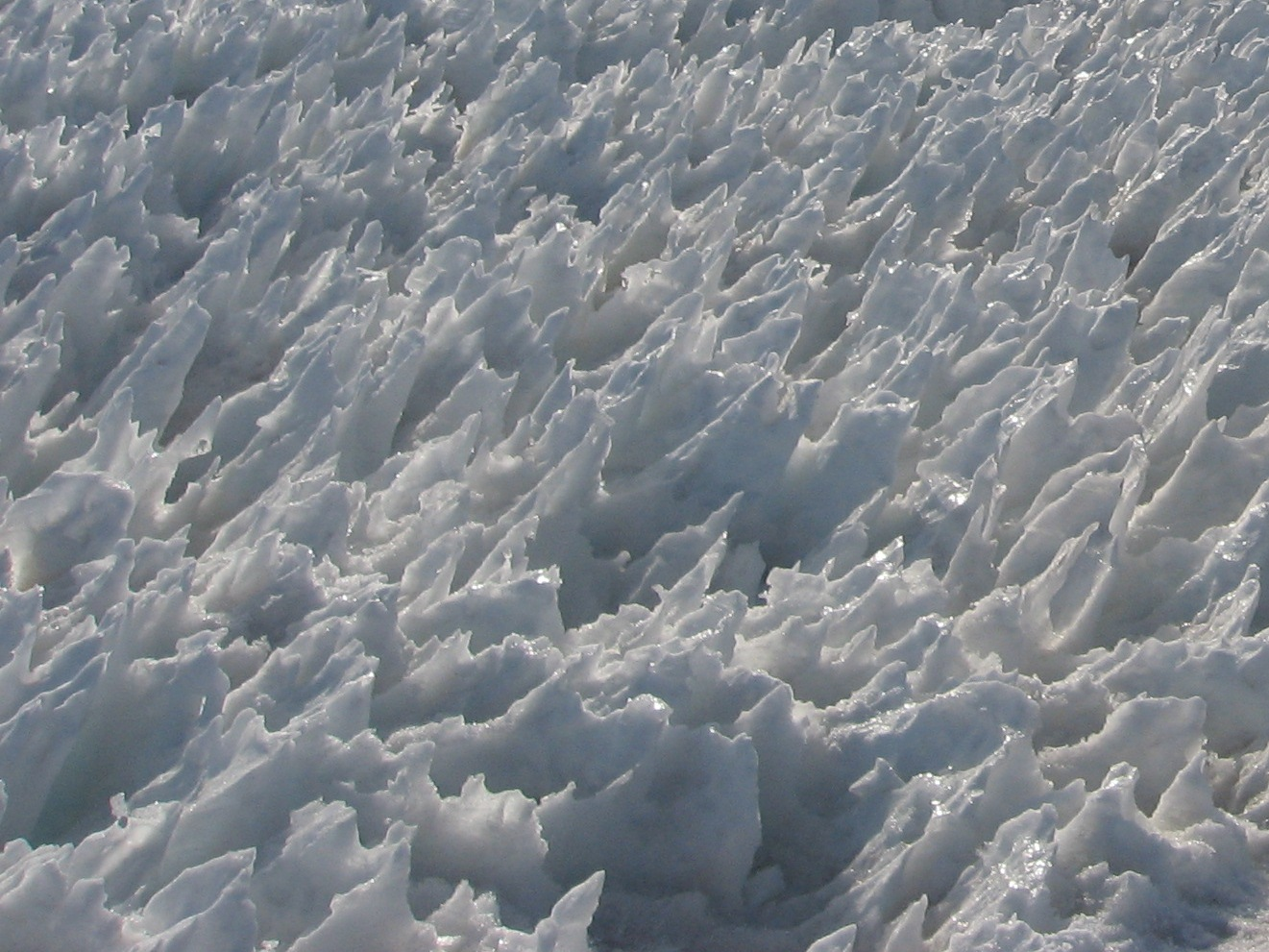
Small penitentes in the summit crater of Mount Rainier

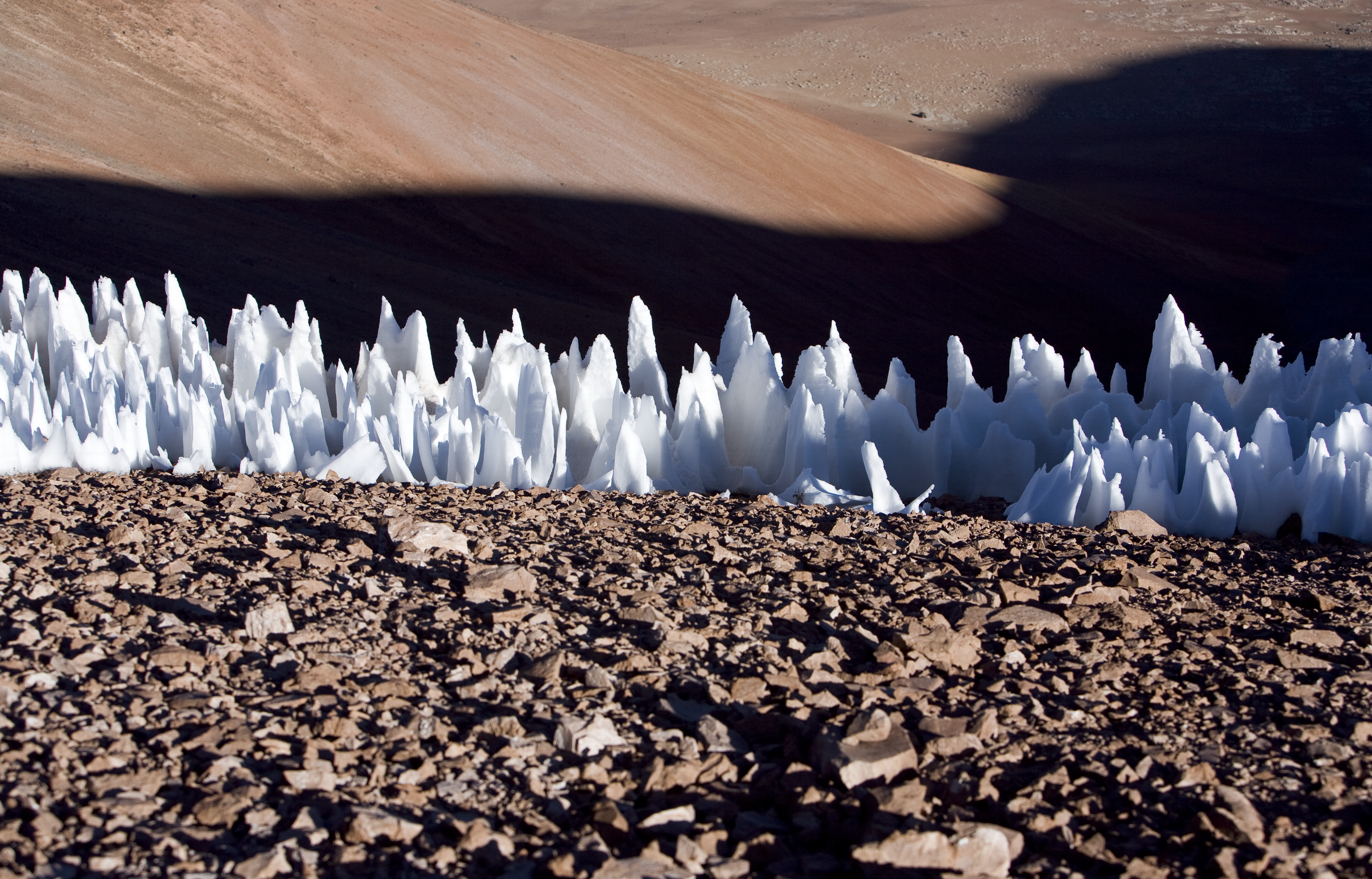
Penitentes ice formations at the southern end of the Chajnantor plain in Chile

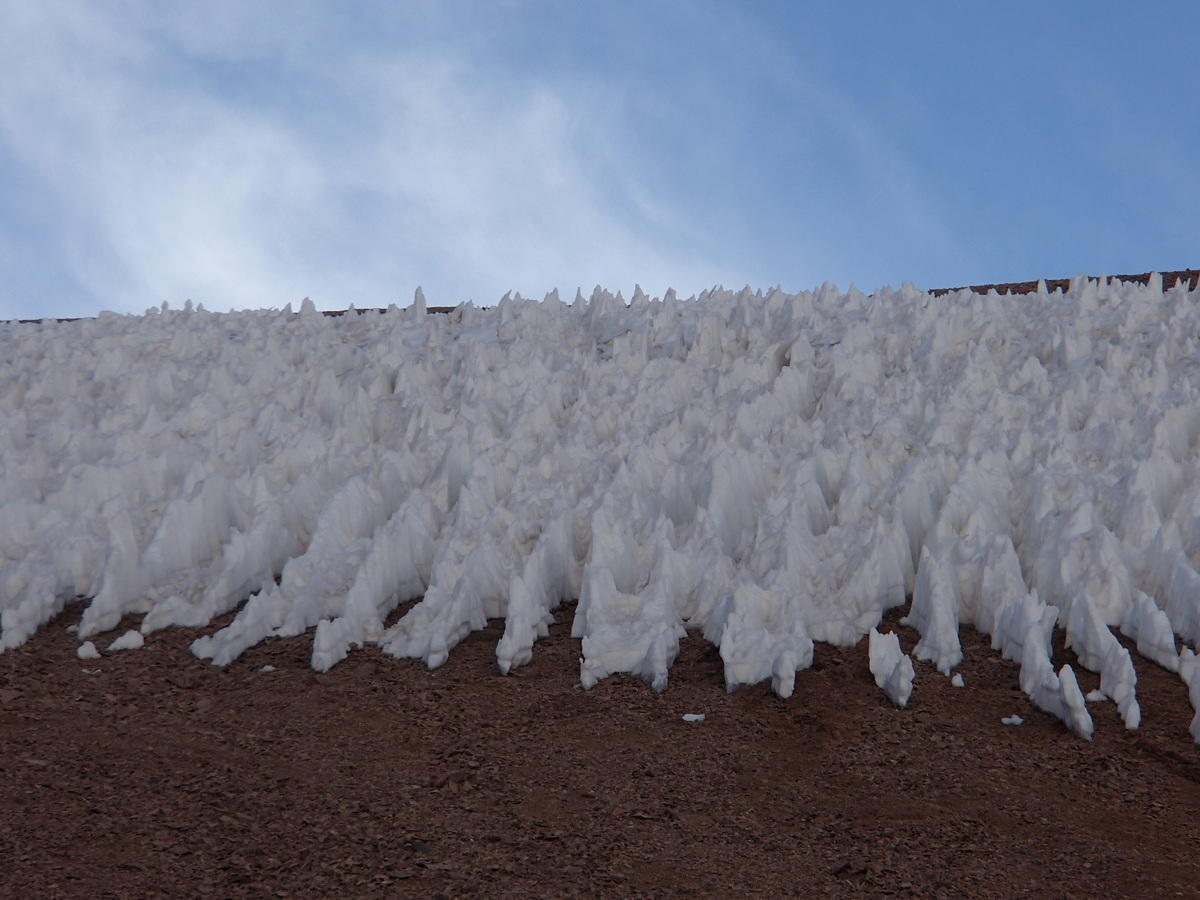
Penitentes near the summit of the Agua Negra Pass on the border between Chile and Argentina

Penitentes, or nieves penitentes (Spanish for "penitent snows"), are a type of snow formation found at high altitudes. They take the form of elongated, thin blades of hardened snow or ice, closely spaced and pointing towards the general direction of the sun.

The name comes from the resemblance of a field of penitentes to a crowd of kneeling people doing penance. The formation evokes the tall, pointed habits and hoods worn by brothers of religious orders in the Processions of Penance during Spanish Holy Week. In particular, the brothers' hats are tall, narrow, and white, with a pointed top.

These spires of snow and ice grow over all glaciated and snow-covered areas in the Dry Andes above 4,000 metres (13,000 ft). They range in length from a few centimetres to over 5 metres (16 ft).

== First description ==
Penitentes were first described in scientific literature by Charles Darwin in 1839. On March 22, 1835, he had to squeeze his way through snowfields covered in penitentes near the Piuquenes Pass, on the way from Santiago de Chile to the Argentine city of Mendoza, and reported the local belief (continuing to the present day) that they were formed by the strong winds of the Andes.

== Formation ==
Snow surfaces facing the sun absorb more radiation, causing more sublimation and melting, leading to the formation of troughs and wedges. The wedges are usually nearly vertical, oriented east-west, and parallel to the solar beam. As the wedges form, sublimation occurs at the peaks as cold and dry air hits them, whereas melting occurs in the troughs, where radiation is concentrated and humid air can stagnate.

The latent heat of melting is 335 J g^{−1} , whereas the latent heat of sublimation is 2838 J g^{−1} , a factor of 8.5 larger. The extreme topography of penitentes results from this 8.5-fold difference: the peaks remain dry and cold by sublimation, losing little mass, but in the troughs the air becomes stagnant and humid, so that sublimation cannot occur; the absorbed solar energy is instead consumed by melting, resulting in rapid loss of mass.

An example of these conditions was noted by Louis Lliboutry on a November afternoon at 3500-m elevation. He noticed that the sublimating spikes of 50-cm height were hard and dry with a temperature of −5°C, whereas in the troughs between the spikes, the snow was wet, containing 14% liquid water. The air temperature outside the troughs was above freezing, but the dew point was below freezing.

In the Southern Hemisphere the wedges become tilted toward the north, at approximately the noontime solar zenith angle, which varies seasonally. The lower limit to the altitude of penitente-formation as a function of latitude for North and South America is from the Cascades at 50°N to the southern Andes at 40°S; this altitude-limit varied from 3000 m at 50°N to 5300 m at the Equator.

Many mathematical models and laboratory studies of penitente formation have been developed, but they ignore the critical role of melting. Nevertheless, the effect of penitentes on the energy balance of the snow surface, and therefore their effect on snow melt and water resources, has also been studied.

== Non-terrestrial ==
Penitentes up to 15 metres (49 ft) high are suggested to be present in the tropics zone on Europa, a satellite of Jupiter. However, subsequent work has cast serious doubts about whether the conditions required to form penitentes on Europa are plausible.

According to a 2017 study, NASA's New Horizons mission discovered penitentes hundreds of meters high on Pluto, likely composed primarily of methane ice deposited seasonally from Pluto's thin atmosphere. The structures occupy a region named Tartarus Dorsa, a name that was formally accepted by the IAU in August 2017.

== See also ==
- Hoar frost
- Rime ice
- Stone Forest
- Suncup (snow)
