= Louis Lliboutry =

French glaciologist (1922–2007)

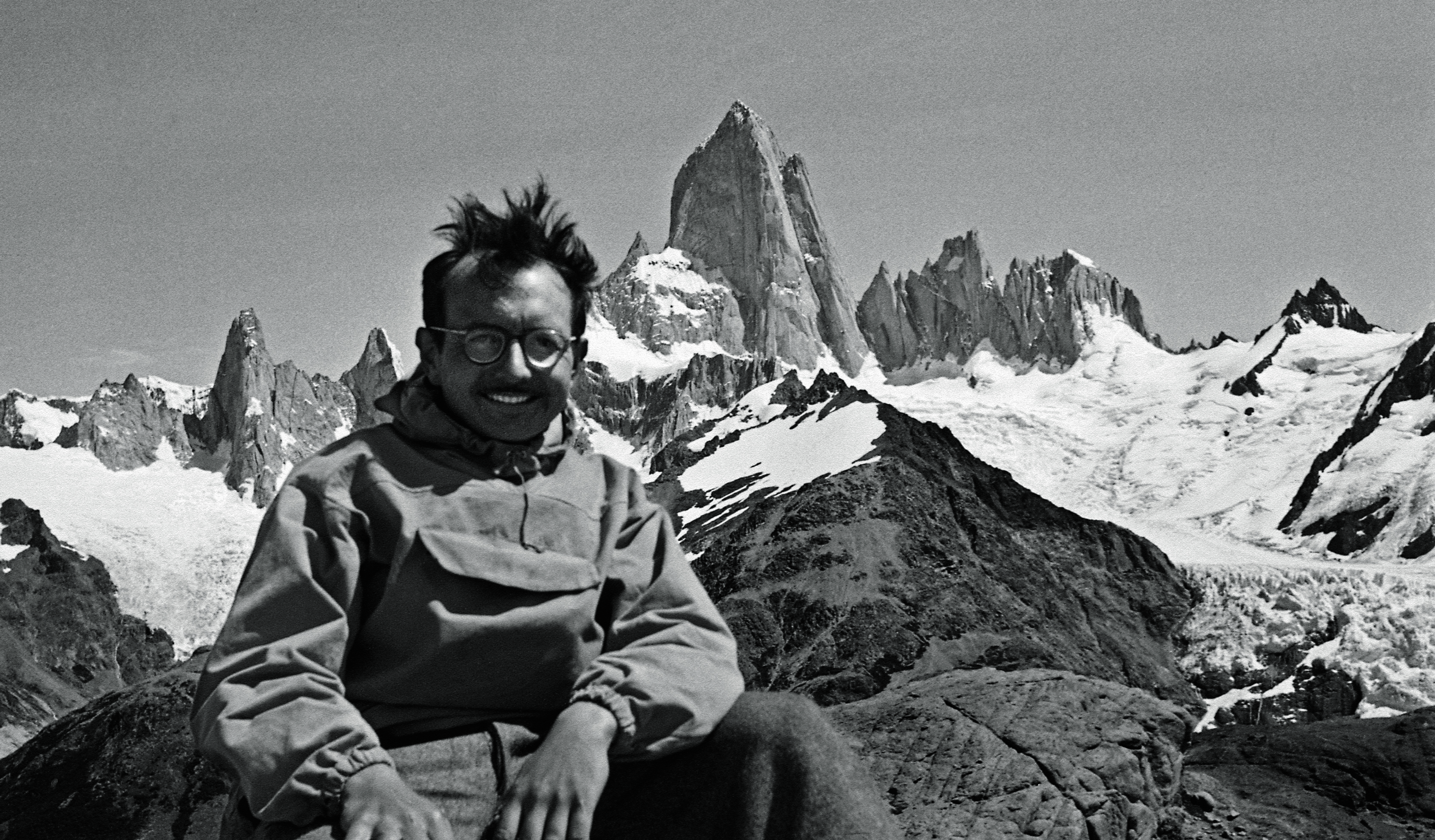
- Lliboutry on top of Cerro Polo, facing Fitz Roy, 1954
- Born: Louis Antonin François Lliboutry; 19 February 1922; Madrid, Spain
- Died: 21 October 2007 (aged 85); Grenoble, France
- Citizenship: French
- Education: École Normale Supérieure
- Occupations: Glaciologist; geophysicist; university professor; mountaineer
- Known for: Founder and director of the Laboratoire de glaciologie et géophysique de l'environnement
- Spouse: Claude Micanel
- Children: 2
- Awards: Ordre des Palmes académiques, Commandeur, 1977; Legion of Honour, Chevalier, 1991; International Glaciological Society, Seligman Crystal, 1993
- Scientific career
- Fields: Glaciology and Geodynamics
- Workplaces: University of Chile; Joseph Fourier University; French National Centre for Scientific Research; Laboratoire de glaciologie et géophysique de l'environnement
- Thesis: L'aimantation des aciers dans les champs magnétiques faibles : effets des tensions, des chocs, des champs magnétiques transversaux (1950)
- Doctoral advisor: Louis Néel

Louis Lliboutry (19 February 1922 – 21 October 2007) was a Spanish-born French glaciologist, geophysicist, university professor and mountaineer. While in Chile in the early 1950s, he analysed and explained the formation of snow penitents in the Andes, which marked his first contribution to glaciology. He founded in Grenoble in 1958 the Laboratoire de glaciologie et géophysique de l'environnement and headed it for 25 years; he also set up at that period a pioneering syllabus in geophysics. His contributions to mechanics of viscous media (such as ice and the Earth's mantle) and to geodynamics are internationally acknowledged.

== Biography ==
=== Early years ===
Louis Antonin François Lliboutry was born on 19 February 1922 in Madrid, to French parents originating from the Perpignan region. Repatriated in 1936 during the Spanish Civil War, he soon revealed his interest for research and exploration, instilled by Jules Verne's novels, while Jean-Henri Fabre's Souvenirs entomologiques led him to observe and collect insects. He also remembers his early passion for Meccano, which perhaps explains why he later became a researcher in mechanics.

After high-school studies in Perpignan and Montpellier, he entered during the German Occupation the École Normale Supérieure, a French grande école in Paris. In April 1945 he passed an agrégation in physics where he tied for third place. Louis Néel, later a Nobel laureate in physics, proposed to Lliboutry a position of teaching assistant in his laboratory in Grenoble. While preparing there his doctorat d'État, Lliboutry discovered mountaineering and climbed many peaks in the Savoy and Dauphiné Alps. He recalls it was in August 1945, during a stay at the "École de haute montagne" (Mountaineering School) in Chamonix, that he first cut steps in the ice of the Bossons Glacier and he realized he was "climbing on water".

In June 1950 he defended his thesis on the variations in magnetization of a steel bar under shocks and strain. Néel acknowledges him as a peerless collaborator, "inventive, bright, slightly temperamental". However Lliboutry could not see himself flourishing in his former patron's laboratory, and he avows he came within an ace of renouncing an academic career. Through the French Ministry of Foreign Affairs, he managed to get a several-years' temporary leave to train high-school teachers at the University of Chile. He took up his duties in Santiago in March 1951.

=== Andean years ===
He soon contacted the Club alpin français which was at that time preparing an expedition to Fitz Roy (3,405 metres (11,171 ft)), a still unconquered summit at the border between Argentina and Chile, in the Patagonian Andes. As the scientist of the expedition, he had twice the opportunity to meet Juan Perón at the Casa Rosada: for logistics when they headed south, and for a decoration when they returned. While staying at the base camp, he made a new topographic survey of the surrounding area, then poorly mapped on Argentine documents which showed very approximate elevations. He climbed twice to Camp III, 400 metres (1,300 ft) below the summit, which was reached by Lionel Terray and Guido Magnone in February 1952 after more than a month's approach and waiting.

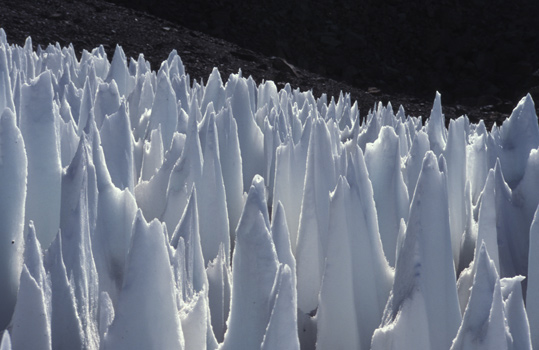
Penitents above Río Blanco, in Argentina.

His duties at the "Pedagógico" (Pedagogical Institute) of the University of Chile left him enough time to explore the High Andes of Santiago where some glaciers, especially rock glaciers, were not mapped yet. The topographical survey he carried out will still be used nearly forty years later. In March 1952, about 4,700 metres (15,400 ft) above sea level in Nevado Juncal close to Aconcagua, he first observed snow penitents, mysterious structures already encountered by Charles Darwin and attributed by natives to carving of névé by strong winds. Lliboutry qualitatively explained their formation, due to complex phenomena of melting and infrared-radiation re-emitted by the penitents. This marks his first important contribution to glaciology.

Lliboutry spent his last year in Chile (1955) writing a book of nearly 500 pages, Nieves y glaciares de Chile, which foreshadowed the two volumes of his future Traité de glaciologie (more than 1,000 pages). In the following decades, his expertise in glaciology and geophysics will be called upon several times in Latin America, notably by the Peruvian government and UNESCO, before and after the Yungay disaster (a debris flow caused by the outburst of lakes near the Huascarán Glacier, making 20,000 casualties on 31 May 1970).

=== The glaciologist ===
He returned to France in 1956 where he secured a position of associate professor with the Grenoble University. He soon entered into contact with Paul-Émile Victor at the French Polar Expeditions, and also with various Swiss, American, and Canadian institutes involved in glaciology. During the next decade, Lliboutry roamed Greenland and Spitsbergen, but the new "Laboratory of Alpine Glaciology" he founded in Grenoble in 1958 will first focus its interest on the near-by Alpine glaciers.

The laboratory founded in 1958 changed its name twenty years later to Laboratory of Glaciology and Geophysics of the Environment, which Lliboutry will head until 1983; then, in 2017 (ten years after his death), to Institute of Geosciences of the Environment, incidentally losing its specificity of glaciology.

=== The geophysicist ===
As early as the 1950s, Lliboutry became interested in the Earth's internal structure, and it is remarkable that book chapters and monographs he wrote between 1973 and 2000 are more devoted to geodynamics than glaciology. He notices that the Earth's mantle, even if it deforms a million times slower than glaciers, finally presents with ice a much greater analogy than what can be established between ice and more usual viscous fluids which deform a thousand billion times more quickly. In Grenoble, he set up in 1959 at the master level a new syllabus in general geophysics which will flourish in the 1960s when the Earth's sciences will be refounded by the plate tectonics "theory".

Two articles published in 1969 and 1970 on the modelling of convection within the Earth's mantle showed him, with Claude Allègre, Xavier Le Pichon and Dan McKenzie, in the very closed circle of European scientists at the leading edge of the new theory. He was the first to notice that the viscosity of the asthenosphere, due to partial melting (of the order of one percent), is analogous to what happens in so-called "temperate glaciers" where ice is also partially melted in the same order of magnitude, with the coexistence of a liquid phase and a solid phase. He also modelled the postglacial rebound of the lithosphere as observed in Fennoscandia or Canada following the disappearance of Quaternary ice caps, which allowed him to infer the mechanical properties of the Earth's mantle, its rheology and its viscosity.

On a different note, his most original publication is probably an article published in 1974. Plate kinematics arbitrarily consider one of the lithospheric plates constituting the Earth's surface (usually the Antarctic Plate) as fixed, and the movement of other plates is described relative to it. "Absolute" movements are much more difficult to determine; to achieve this, one usually makes use of hot spots, supposed time-invariant while plates drift over them. Starting from a "simple" principle (the resulting moment of the absolute velocities of the plates on the Earth as a whole is a null vector), Lliboutry managed to compute this absolute movement for all the plates known in his time, without having to involve the "hot spots referential". Both approaches are remarkably consistent.

== Distinctions and legacy ==
From 1976 to 1980, he has presided the European Geophysical Society, then, between 1983 and 1987, the International Commission on Snow and Ice, an emanation of the International Association of Hydrological Sciences. Elected an honorary member of the International Glaciological Society, he was the 1993 recipient of the Seligman Crystal, a prize granted by this Society for major breakthroughs in glaciology (one recipient every two years on the average).

In Chile, the mountain Cerro Lliboutry (1,980 metres (6,500 ft)), close to the Southern Patagonian Ice Field, was named in his honour. First climbed in 2005, it is henceforth designated as el Lliboutry in Chilean mountaineering guidebooks. His name was also officially given in 1983 to the Lliboutry Glacier, which flows from the Boyle Mountains to the Bourgeois Fjord in the Antarctic Peninsula.

Louis Lliboutry was awarded the Legion of Honour (Chevalier) in 1991 and the Ordre des Palmes académiques (Commandeur) in 1977.

A recent book in French recalls how he contributed to launch modern glaciology.

== Selected publications ==
In this selection, each publication is signed ″Louis Lliboutry″ as the only author.

- L'aimantation des aciers dans les champs magnétiques faibles : effets des tensions, des chocs, des champs magnétiques transversaux (Thesis) (in French). Paris: Masson. 1950.
- "La région du Fitz-Roy (Andes de Patagonie)". Revue de géographie alpine (in French). 41 (4): 607–694. 1953.
- Lliboutry, Louis (1954). "Le massif du Nevado Juncal (Andes de Santiago), ses pénitents et ses glaciers". Revue de géographie alpine (in French). 42 (3): 465–495. doi:10.3406/rga.1954.1142.
- Lliboutry, Louis (1954). "The origin of penitents". Journal of Glaciology. 2 (15): 331–338. doi:10.3189/S0022143000025181. S2CID 129096835.
- Nieves y glaciares de Chile : fundamentos de glaciología (in Spanish). Santiago: Ediciones de la Universidad de Chile. 1956.
- Physique de base pour biologistes, médecins, géologues (in French). Paris: Masson. 1963 [1st pub. 1959].
- Traité de glaciologie Volume 1: Neige, glace, hydrologie nivale (in French). Paris: Masson. 1964.
- Traité de glaciologie Volume 2: Glaciers, variations du climat, sols gelés (in French). Paris: Masson. 1965.
- in Jean Goguel, ed. (1971). "Physique des glaciers". Géophysique. Encyclopédie de la Pléiade, 8 (in French). Paris: Gallimard. pp. 960–1026.
- in Jean Coulomb and Georges Jobert, ed. (1973). "Chapter 1: Mécanique des solides : bases physiques". Traité de géophysique interne (in French). Vol. 1: Sismologie et pesanteur. Paris: Masson. pp. 1–48.
- in Jean Coulomb and Georges Jobert, ed. (1973). "Chapter 3: Frottement, rupture et origine des séismes". Traité de géophysique interne (in French). Vol. 1: Sismologie et pesanteur. Paris: Masson. pp. 67–82.
- in Jean Coulomb and Georges Jobert, ed. (1973). "Chapter 17: Isostasie, propriétés rhéologiques du manteau supérieur". Traité de géophysique interne (in French). Vol. 1: Sismologie et pesanteur. Paris: Masson. pp. 473–505.
- in Jean Coulomb and Georges Jobert, ed. (1976). "Chapter 41: Courants de convection et dynamique des plaques". Traité de géophysique interne (in French). Vol. 2: Magnétisme et géodynamique. Paris: Masson. pp. 501–571.
- Tectonophysique et géodynamique (in French). Paris: Masson. 1982.
- Very Slow Flows of Solids: Basics of Modeling in Geology and Glaciology. Dordrecht: Kluwer. 1987.
- Sciences géométriques et télédétection (in French). Paris: Masson. 1992.
- Géophysique et géologie (in French). Paris: Masson. 1998.
- Quantitative Geophysics and Geology. Londres: Springer. 2000.

== See also ==
- Fitz Roy
- Lliboutry Glacier
- Snow penitents

== Bibliography ==
- Lliboutry, Louis (1999). Les glaciers furent mes frères : de l'exploration des Andes chiliennes à l'émergence de la glaciologie moderne (in French). p. 460. ISBN 978-2951391901.
- Turrel, Marc (2017). Louis Lliboutry, le Champollion des glaces (in French). Grenoble: UGA Éditions. p. 288. ISBN 978-2377470112.
