= International Glaciological Society =

International glaciology academic organization

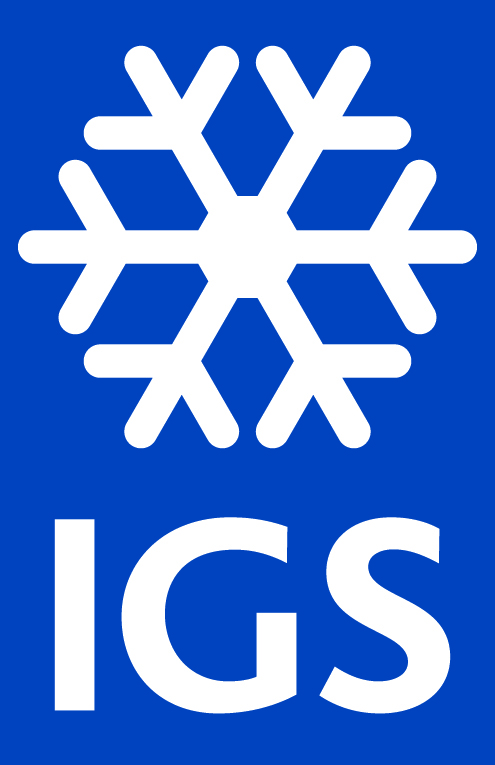
- Abbreviation: IGS
- Formation: 1936
- Type: Learned Society
- Legal status: Registered Charity; Number 231043
- Location(s): High Cross, Madingley Road, Cambridge, CB3 OET, United Kingdom
- Region served: Worldwide
- Secretary General: Allen Pope
- Website: www.igsoc.org

The International Glaciological Society (IGS) was founded in 1936 to provide a focus for individuals interested in glaciology, practical and scientific aspects of snow and ice. It was originally known as the "Association for the Study of Snow and Ice". The name was changed to the "British Glaciological Society" in 1945. With more and more non-British glaciologists attending its readings and submitting papers for publication, the name was changed to the "Glaciological Society" in 1962 and finally the Society acquired its present name in 1971. The IGS publishes the Journal of Glaciology, Annals of Glaciology and ICE, the news bulletin of the IGS; the Journal of Glaciology won the ALPSP/Charlesworth Award for the "Best Learned Journal of 2007".

== Branches ==
The Society has branches in different parts of the world, providing a further opportunity for those sharing a common interest to meet and exchange information:

- British Branch (United Kingdom)
- Nordic branch
- Northeastern North American Branch
- Polish Branch
- Western Alpine branch
- New Zealand branch

== Awards ==
=== The Seligman Crystal ===
The Society honours glaciologists who have contributed significantly to the science of glaciology. At a Council meeting in Obergurgl, Austria in late 1962, the concept of an award for excellence in the discipline of glaciology took shape: not a gold medal but a hexagonal crystal of high-quality glass named the Seligman Crystal, after the Society's founder, Gerald Seligman. It is awarded 'from time to time to one who has made an outstanding scientific contribution to glaciology so that the subject is now enriched.'

=== The Richardson Medal ===
The Richardson Medal was created in 1993 to mark the retirement of the Secretary General, Mrs Hilda Richardson. This award recognises outstanding contributions to the Society and to glaciology, and is normally awarded to members. Awardees include:

- 1993 - Hilda Richardson
- 1997 - D R MacAyeal
- 1998 - G K C Clarke
- 2000 - J A Heap
- 2003 - C S L Ommanney
- 2010 - T H Jacka
- 2012 - W S B (Stan) Paterson
- 2013 - J W Glen and A Weidick
- 2016 - E M Morris and T Chinn
- 2017 - J M Palais
- 2018 - J Oerlemans
- 2020 - Christina Hulbe and Eric Wolff
- 2021 - Regine Hock
- 2022 - The ISMIP6 team
- 2023 - Tavi Murray
- 2024 - Bethan Davies
- 2025 - Magnus Már Magnússon

=== Honorary Membership ===
Honorary Membership is the oldest of the Society's awards. It was first officially recorded in the 1962 Constitution, when the name of the Society changed from “the British Glaciological Society” to “the Glaciological Society”. (Prior to that date, a few eminent persons had been made Honorary Members on an informal and ad hoc basis.). There shall not exceed twelve in number.

The following are Honorary Members:

- G K C Clarke
- J W Glen
- V M Kotlyakov
- G Østrem
- G Wakahama
- Yang Zhenniang
- K Higuchi

See also

- Ukichiro Nakaya

== See also ==
- International Association of Cryospheric Sciences
