= 1800 in Norway =

- Centuries: 16th; 17th; 18th; 19th; 20th
- Decades: 1780s; 1790s; 1800s; 1810s; 1820s
- See also: 1800 in Denmark; List of years in Norway

Events in the year 1800 in Norway.

== Incumbents ==
- Monarch: Christian VII.

== Events ==
- The Lærdal Rebellion starts.

== Arts and literature ==
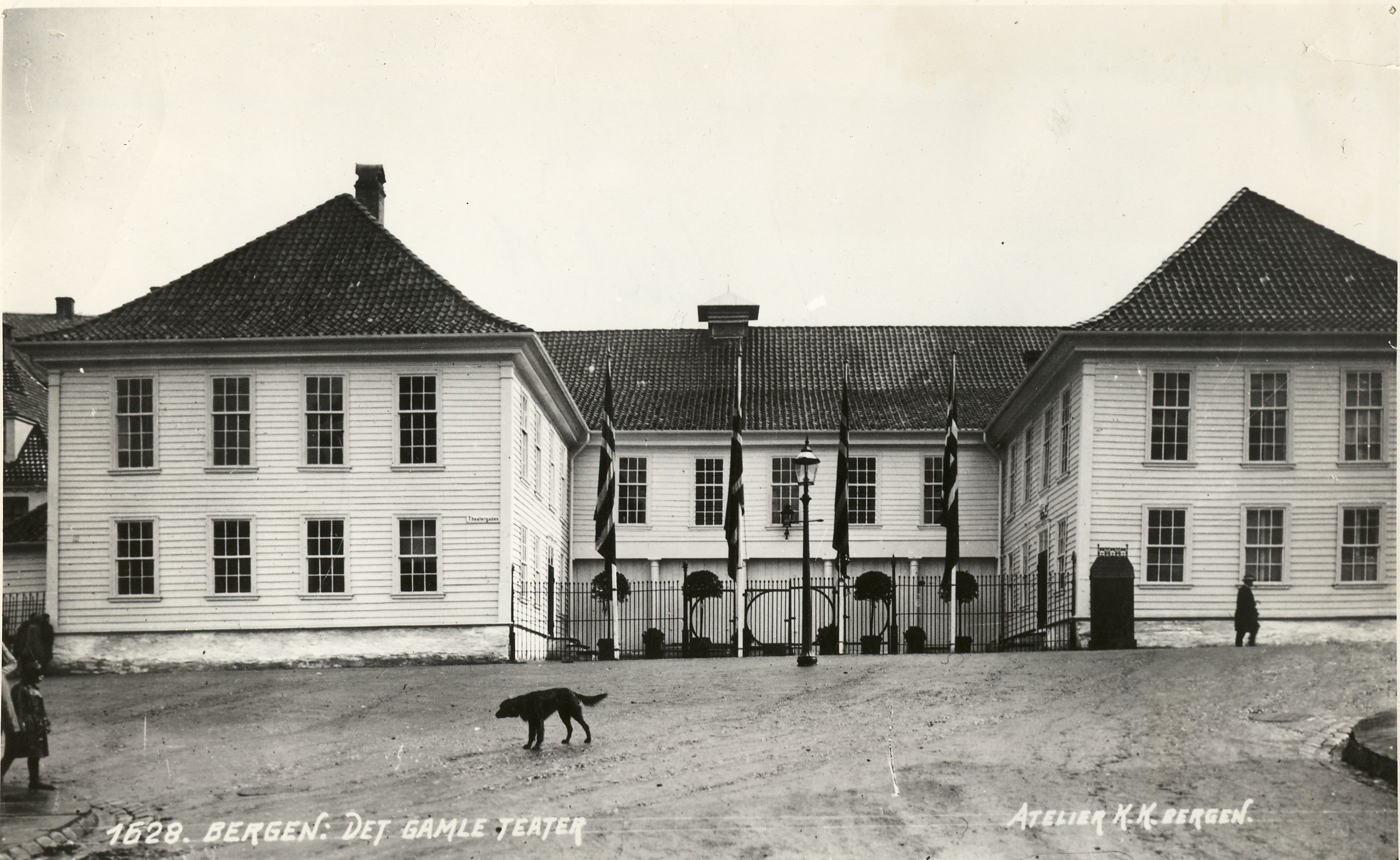
Komediehuset på Engen.

- The first theatre building in Norway; Komediehuset på Engen was built.

== Births ==
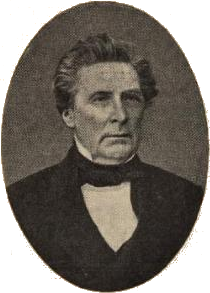
Halvor Olaus Christensen.

- 18 February - Halvor Olaus Christensen, politician (died 1891)
- 6 March – Gustava Kielland, author and missionary (died 1889)
- 11 March – Nils Otto Tank, Moravian Church religious leader, land speculator, canal and railroad promoter (died 1864)
- 7 April – Peter Feilberg, newspaper editor and politician (died 1863)
- 8 October – Carl Roosen, cartographer and military officer (died 1880).
- 18 October – Christian Cornelius Paus, lawyer, civil servant and politician (died 1879)
- 22 October – Christian Lassen, orientalist (died 1876).

=== Full date unknown ===
- Lars Johannesen Aga, politician
- Hans Pedersen Herrefosser, politician
- Ingebrigt Haldorsen Sæter, politician (died 1875)

== Deaths ==
- 22 February – Even Hammer, civil servant (born 1732)
- 2 June – Ingeborg Akeleye, noblewoman (born 1741)
