= Roosen =

Roosen is a Dutch surname. It is either of matronymic origin (Roos' son), or it refers to a rose or roses. Among variant forms are Roose, Rooze or Roozen. Notable people with the surname include:

- Adelheid Roosen (born 1958), Dutch actress and playwright
- Carl Roosen (1800–1880), Norwegian cartographer and military officer
- Hyacinthe Roosen 1897–?), Belgian free style wrestler
- Luc Roosen (born 1964), Belgian cyclist
- Maria Roosen (born 1957), Dutch sculptor and illustrator
- Richard Roosen (1901–1980), German mechanical engineer
- Timo Roosen (born 1993), Dutch cyclist

Roozen

- Annette Roozen (born 1976), Dutch paraplegic track and field athlete
- Nico Roozen (born 1953), Dutch economist, co-founder of the first Fairtrade certification initiative

Rooze

- Rene Rooze (born 1969), Dutch kickboxer
