= Anna Schober =

Austrian historian

Anna Schober (also known as Anna Schober-de Graaf) (born 1966 in Wolfsberg, Carinthia) is an Austrian historian and University Professor of Visual Culture at the Institute for Cultural Analysis of the Alpen-Adria University Klagenfurt.

== Biography ==
Schober studied history, art history and political science in Vienna, Frankfurt and Colchester. In 2009 she got her postdoctoral habilitation at the University of Vienna with a thesis on aesthetic tactics as a means of political emancipation in modernity and the present.

Schober completed a number of international research stays for example at the Center for Theoretical Studies in the Humanities and Social Sciences at the University of Essex, Colchester (2000-2003) and at the Jan Van Eyck Academie in Maastricht (2003). At the University of Vienna she directed the FWF projects "Aesthetic tricks as a means of political emancipation" (2003-2006) and "City Squats: The Cinema as a space for political action" (2006-2009).

From 2009 to 2011, Schober was Marie Curie Fellow and Visiting Professor at the University of Verona, where she carried out the project "Picturing Gender". In 2011 she took over a Mercator Visiting Professorship at the Institute of Sociology of the University of Giessen, where she also worked as a deputy professor and head of a DFG research project until 2016.

Since September 2016 Anna Schober is Professor of Visual Culture at the Alpen-Adria-Universität Klagenfurt.

== Scientific contribution ==
In her dissertation "Blue Jeans. An artificial mythology ", Schober reconstructs how myths about the Blue Jeans have constituted in different visual worlds (silent films, documentary photography, Hollywood films and youth subcultures) as well as in various consumer milieus in the USA and Western Europe since the end of the 19th century and how these myths have been transnationally transmitted and transformed.

In her postdoctoral habilitation, Schober explores the invention of an avant-garde and neo-avant-garde tradition in Western and Southeastern Europe, connected with a history of protest movements in the 20th and 21st centuries. The goal was to create a critical genealogy of these practices in order to re-evaluate aesthetic intervention into the public sphere, emphasizing the incalculability of these endeavors and their contingent participation on the constitution of aesthetic-political hegemonies.

Schober continues her genealogical research in the project "Everybody - a transnational iconography" funded by DFG and writes a genealogy and iconography of "everybodies" - anthropomorphic iconic figures addressing and involving the audience. In a research project on cinema as a movement in Central and Southeastern Europe, Schober examined how since the 1960s cinema spectators became cinema makers through such practices as squatting in existing cinema spaces, organizing cinema "events," writing about film, and making films themselves. Drawing on a corpus of interviews with cinema activists, Schober compares the activities and artistic productions they staged in urban environments in Germany, Austria, and the former Yugoslavia. This study focuses on differences and similarities in the development of political public culture in countries with pluralist-democratic, one-party socialist, and post-socialist traditions.

== Memberships in scientific organisations ==
Schober is a member of various scientific associations. For the periods 2014-2018 and 2018-2022 she is on the Scientific Board of the Research Committee (RC57) of the International Sociological Association (ISA).
