= Oerlemans =

Oerlemans is a Dutch toponymic surname most likely indicating an origin in the former hamlet of Oerle, currently a borough of Tilburg, although a connection to the town of Oerle, North Brabant can not be ruled out.

Notable Dutch people with the surname include:

- Daniëlle Oerlemans-Overgaag (born 1973), road cyclist, wife of Reinout
- Hans Oerlemans (born 1950), climatologist and glaciologist
- Jeroen Oerlemans (1970–2016), photojournalist
- Marcel Oerlemans (born 1969), football striker
- Natasja Oerlemans (born 1969), Party for the Animals politician
- Reinout Oerlemans (born 1971), actor, director, producer and presenter, husband of Daniëlle
- Yvonne Oerlemans (1945–2012), sculptor, installation artist
