= Hans Pedersen (disambiguation) =

Hans Pedersen (1887–1943) was a Danish gymnast.

Hans Pedersen may also refer to:

- Hans Eiler Pedersen (1890–1971), Danish gymnast

== See also ==
- Hans Pedersen Herrefosser (1800–1869), Norwegian politician
- Hans Pedersen-Dan (1859–1939), Danish sculptor
- Hans Petersen (disambiguation)
