= Maria Roosen =

Dutch sculptor and illustrator (born 1957)

- Born: Maria Lucia Cecilia Roosen; 2 April 1957 (age 68); Oisterwijk, Netherlands
- Occupations: Sculptor and illustrator

Maria Lucia Cecilia («Maria») Roosen (born 2 April 1957) is a Dutch sculptor and illustrator, as well as jewelry designer. Roosen works mainly with glass and watercolor.

== Career ==
Roosen was born in Oisterwijk, in the Netherlands. She studied at the Moller Institute (Tehatex) in Tilburg between 1976 and 1981, and in 1981 and 1983 she studied at the Art Academy in Arnhem. In 1995, she was invited to participate in the Venice Biennale, where she exhibited with Marlene Dumas and Marijke van Warmerdam. The presentation was curated by Chris Dercon. She exhibited in 1999 with Home is where the heart is at the Kunstvereniging Diepenheim in Diepenheim, in 2001 with Maria Roosen in Himmelblau at the Groninger Museum in Groningen, and in 2006 with Maria's Maria at the Stedelijk Museum in Schiedam. She also participated in the art event Sonsbeek 2001 in Arnhem in 2001.

Maria Roosen received the Dutch Wilhelminaring Sculpture Prize 2006 and created a work for the Sprengenpark in Apeldoorn. In 2009, she won the Singer Oeuvre Prize and showed her work in the Maria Roosen exhibition. In 2020 she received the Jeanne Oosting Prize (watercolor).

The artist lives and works in Arnhem. She taught at the Academie Minerva in Groningen from 1992 to 2001, guest lecturer at the AKI in Enschede, the Utrecht School of the Arts in Arnhem and the Jan van Eyck Academy in Maastricht. She has also taught at the Glass Department of the Gerrit Rietveld Academie in Amsterdam. Roosen creates sculptures, installations and conceptual art. Most of his objects are made of glass and ceramics.

== Works (selection) ==
- Ogen voor het Oosten (2000), Woningbouwvereniging het oosten, Sarphatistraat in Amsterdam
- 1 + 1 = 3 (2002), rotonte van Alen in Maasdriel
- Zonder titel (2003), Amsterdam
- Hoogtepunten (2003), Keuringsdienst van Waren in Woensel
- Centraalbeweging (2003), Diemen
- De Regenboog (2004), Antoni van Leeuwenhoekziekenhuis in Amsterdam
- Toiletten (2004), Rabo Theater in Hengelo
- De Madonna van Enschede (2005), Loenshof in Enschede
- Duiven (2005), Bibliotheek De Brugse Poort in Gent
- Spiegelbollen - Albert Cuyp (2006), Bagijnhof/J. de Wittstraat in Dordrecht
- Boomsieraad (2008), John F. Kennedypark in Apeldoorn
- Druiventros (2008), Achmea in Zeist
- Braamboot (2009), Singer Museum in Laren
- Borstentros (2010), Beeldenpark van Museum Arnhem in Arnhem
- Monument Anna Blaman - Eenzaam avontuur (2010) in Rotterdam
- Regenboogbrug over de Jansbeek (2019), Beekstraat in Arnhem

== Exhibitions (selection) ==
- 1995 - Marlene Dumas, Maria Roosen, Marijke van Warmerdam, Pabellón Neerlandés, Bienal de Venecia, Italia
- 2014 - Kettingreacties, sieraden en fotografie van Claartje Keur, CODA, Apeldoorn

== Public collections ==
- Arnhem Museum, Arnhem
- Museum Boijmans Van Beuningen, Rotterdam
- Groninger Museum, Groninga
- Het Noordbrabants Museum, 's-Hertogenbosch
- Stedelijk de Schiedam Museum, Schiedam

== Gallery ==
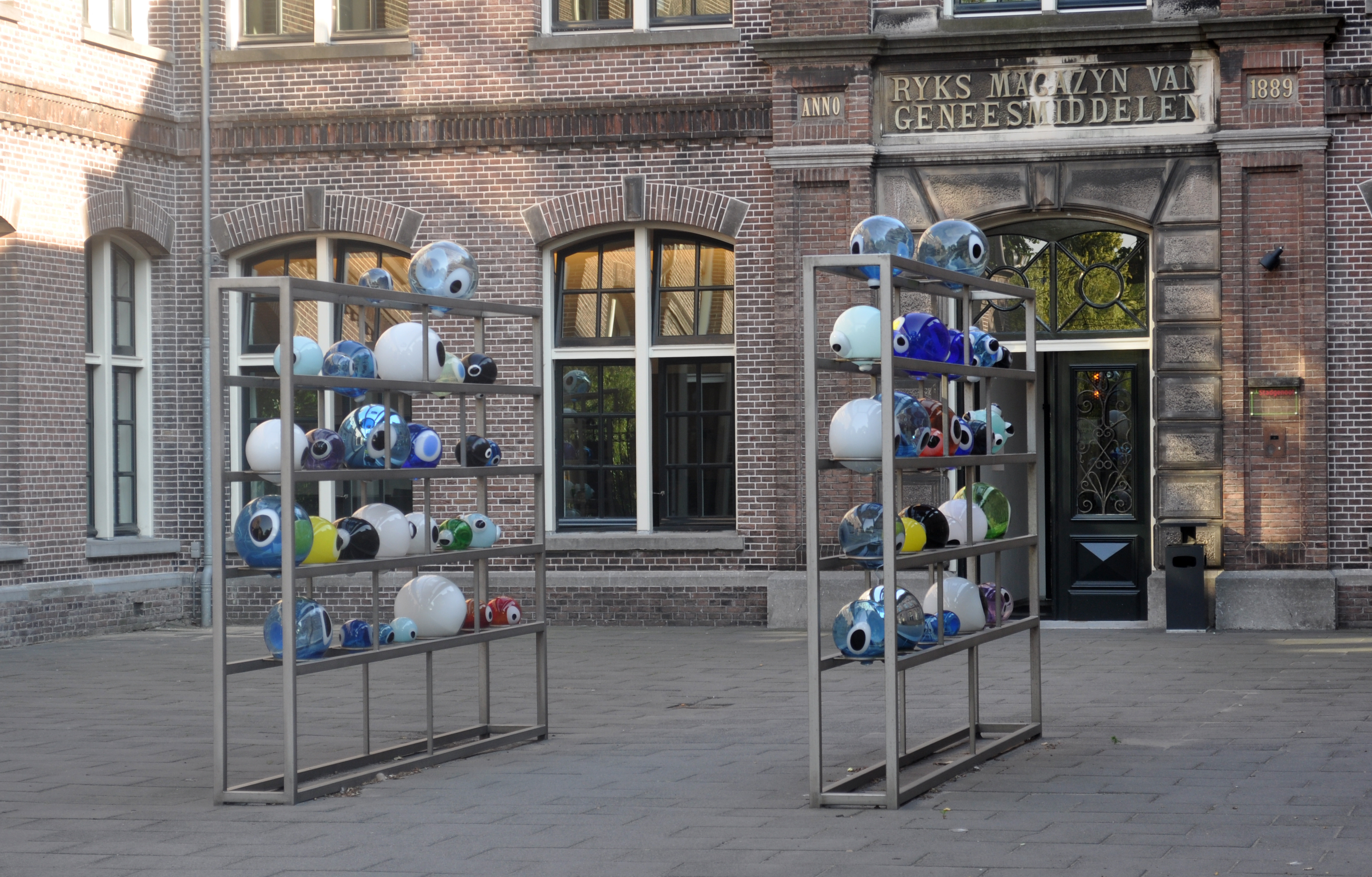
Ogen voor het Oosten (2000)

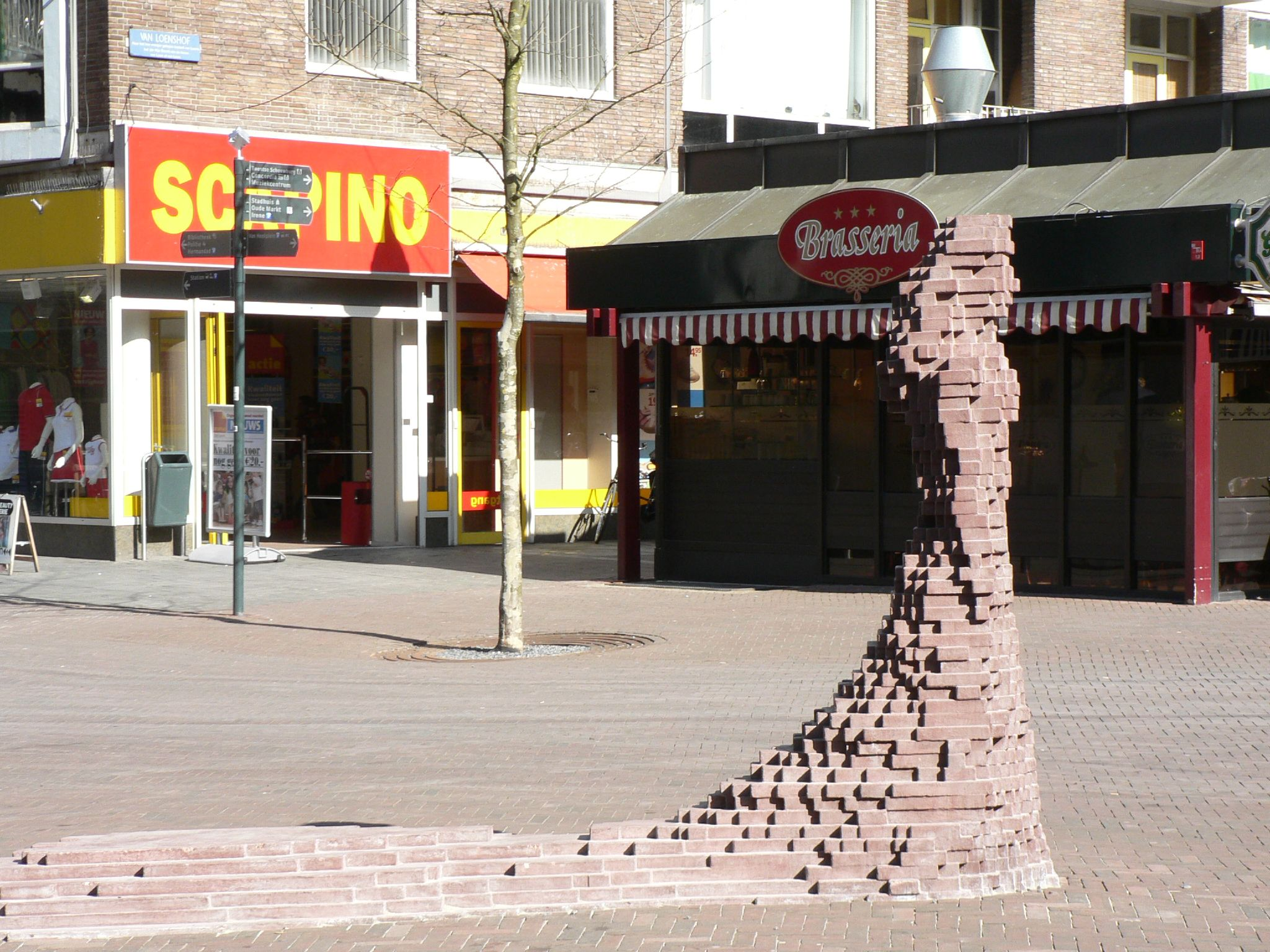
De Madonna van Enschede (2005)

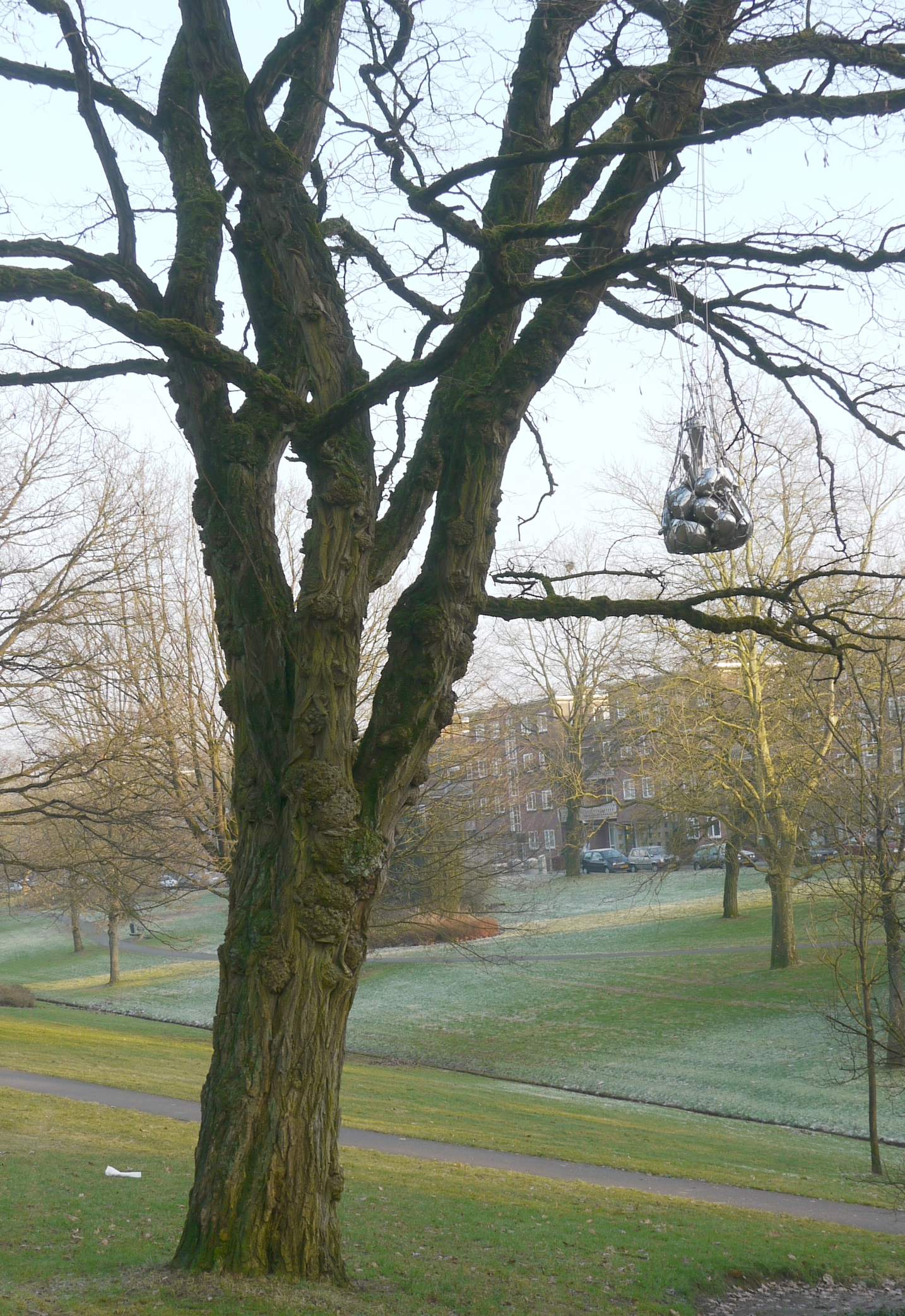
Boomsieraad (2008)

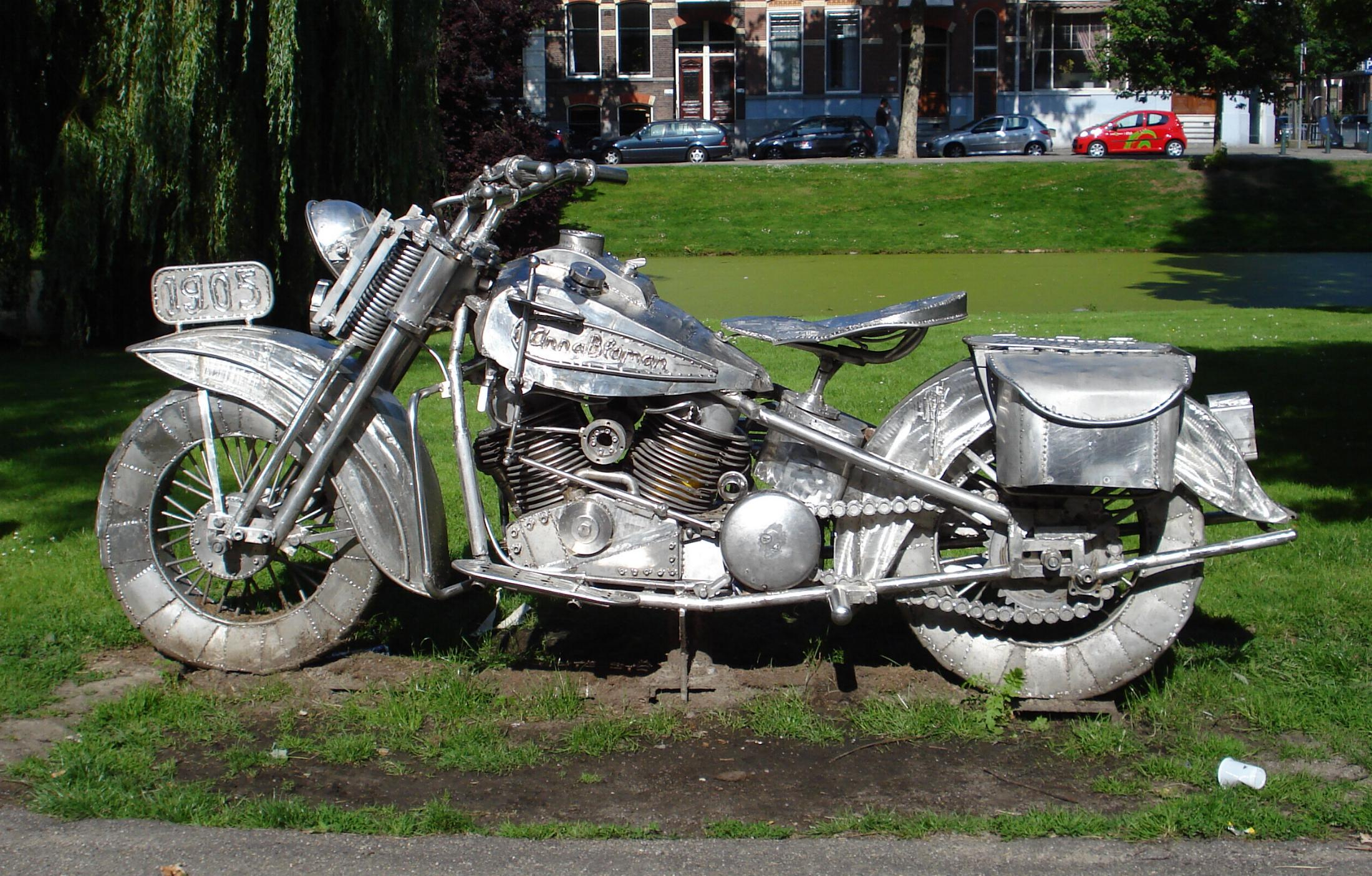
Eenzaam avontuur (2010)

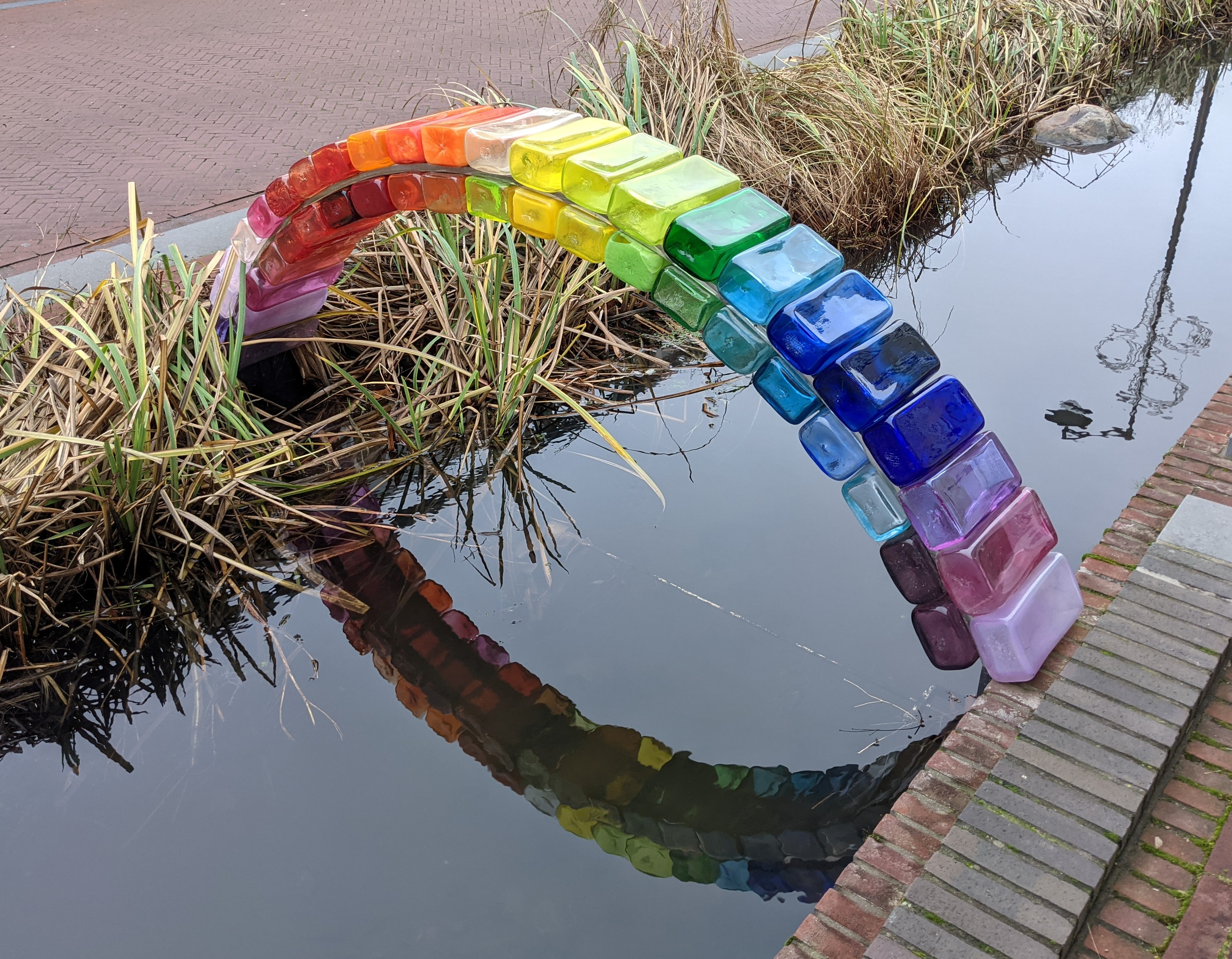
Regenboogbrug over de Jansbeek (2019)
