= Roose (surname) =

Roose is a surname, and may refer to:

- Betty Roose (1778–1808), German actress
- Caesar Roose (1886–1967) New Zealand ship owner
- Caroline Roose (born 1968), Belgian-born French politician
- Kevin Roose, author and business columnist for the New York Times
- Leigh Richmond Roose (1877–1916), Welsh footballer
- Richard Roose (died 1531), English cook convicted of attempted poisoning
- Thorkild Roose (1874–1961), Danish actor and theatre director
- Roose Bolton, Fictional A Song of Ice and Fire character
