= Elisa Caldana =

Italian visual artist

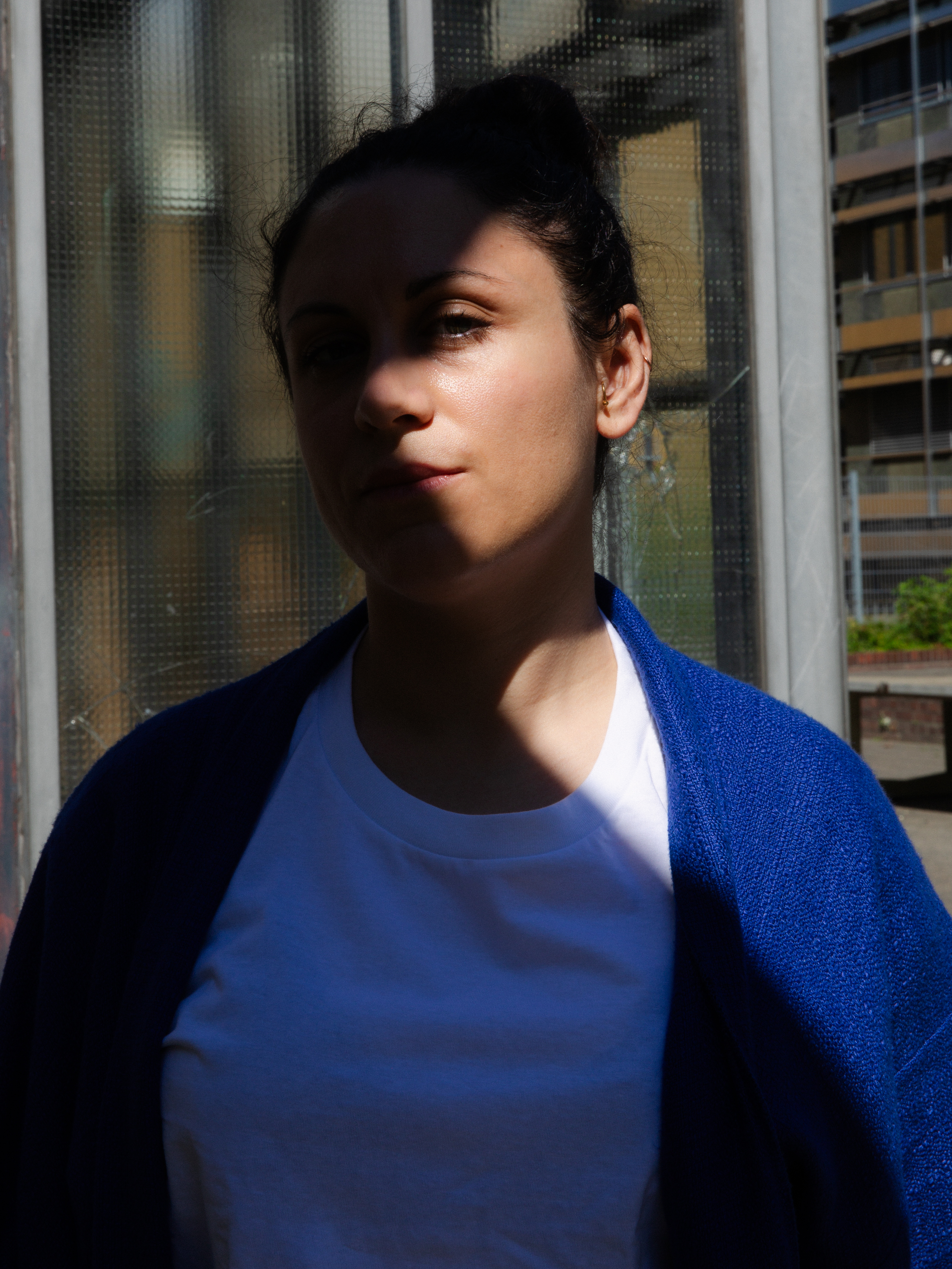
- Elisa Caldana, portrait by Diana Pfammatter (2024)
- Born: March 4, 1986 (age 40); Pordenone, Italy
- Education: Städelschule (DE), IUAV University of Venice (IT), Jan van Eyck Academie (NL)
- Known for: Contemporary art
- Awards: Italian Council (2019, 2023); Mondriaan Fonds Kunstenaar Basis (2022); Hessische Kulturstiftung Atelierstipendium (London, 2016–2017)
- Website: elisacaldana.info

Elisa Caldana (born 4 March 1986, Pordenone, Italy) is an Italian contemporary artist whose work spans sculpture, installation, performance, film, and writing. Her practice explores themes related to architecture, public space, monuments, and collective identity.

== Early life and education ==
Caldana grew up in northern Italy, where she assisted her father at a rehabilitation centre for injured birds of prey that operated from their home between 1988 and 2011. She studied visual arts at the IUAV University of Venice, and later attended the Städelschule in Frankfurt am Main, graduating in 2013. During her time at the Städelschule, she studied under Simon Starling, who won the Turner Prize in 2005, and participated in the Pure Fiction seminar led by science fiction writer and cultural critic Mark von Schlegell.

== Work ==
Caldana has exhibited internationally in museums and art institutions, including MACTE Museo di Arte Contemporanea di Termoli (2025); WEST, The Hague (2024); SIC, Helsinki (2024); MAXXI Museum, Rome (2023); Italian Cultural Institute, Mexico City (2022); MAMbo Museum, Bologna (2021); Whitechapel Gallery, London (2020); ROZENSTRAAT, Amsterdam (2020); TOKAS Hongo, Tokyo (2019); ar/ge Kunst Kunstverein, Bozen (2017); and Fondazione Sandretto Re Rebaudengo, Turin (2016/2019). Her work frequently engages with themes of ecology, postcolonialism, and the relationship between human and non-human subjects.

Among her representative works, The Falcon of Karachi is a multi-format artistic investigation that explores the laggar falcon, a Near Threatened species native to South Asia. The project was presented in 2025 as a solo exhibition at MACTE – Museo di Arte Contemporanea di Termoli and draws from ecological fieldwork to examine the complex cultural and economic relationships between humans and falcons in Pakistan. A key aspect of the work challenges metaphorical interpretations and instead advocates for recognising birds of prey as subjects in their own right.

As part of the research process, Caldana traveled to Pakistan to observe wild laggar falcons and local falconry practices. In the publication accompanying the project, philosopher Fahim Amir reflects: “Following the bird, we entangle ourselves in a forcefield of power and representation, identity and difference, inequality of wealth and diversity of migration, localism and globalism, seemingly timeless nature and cutting-edge technology, border regimes and militarism haunting old colonial frontiers.” The Falcon of Karachi has been presented at WEST Den Haag, Vasl Artists’ Association (Karachi), SIC (Helsinki), and MACTE (Termoli), among others. The project received support from the Italian Council and the Mondriaan Fund.

While Caldana’s recent projects increasingly address human–non-human relations, her earlier works explore spatial politics, systems of control, and counter-representational strategies. For example, Shutterstreet (2019), a site-specific installation of closed storefronts, reflects on the decline of small-scale commerce under late capitalism. First exhibited at Palazzo Carignano in Turin and produced by Fondazione Sandretto Re Rebaudengo, the work draws on the Japanese term シャッター通り (shattā dōri), used to describe shopping streets lined with shuttered shops. Caldana described the shutters as “sculptural presences, architectural ghosts, ruins of capitalism. A sort of anti-monuments which, placed in the courtyard of Palazzo Carignano, demonstrate the clear contrast between the sumptuousness of the Baroque and contemporary misery,” while the work as a whole critiques the global collapse of small businesses under pressure from multinational corporations and explores how crisis and decay manifest within the built environment.

Her earlier work, The Island Behind the Horizon (2015), marks a shift from urban landscapes to maritime borders. It consists of a video filmed entirely from the sea—never revealing land—and a related nautical chart concerning a geographically liminal context: the island of Lampedusa. The video was shot in the Mediterranean Sea at the point where Lampedusa—the southernmost island of Italy and the first landing point for migrants arriving in Europe—remains hidden behind the horizon line before appearing to those navigating at sea. Andrea Masala describes the work as emblematic of attention to liminal spaces, noting how the video and accompanying chart relate to this boundary geography. The work critiques dominant portrayals of Mediterranean migration by centering the migrant’s perspective. It also subverts traditional cartographic authority through what Andrea Masala describes as “a map of (in)visibility, rather than of absence,” suggesting that Caldana’s piece reveals “an alternative truth that is not imposed from above, but one that often does not appear in official geographic charts.” The work was first presented in the exhibition Passo Dopo Passo at Fondazione Sandretto Re Rebaudengo in Turin, which examined diverse artworks reflecting on movement, openness, and enclosure, framed within an Italian perspective—a country with an intrinsic relationship to questions of migration.

== Residencies ==
Caldana has participated in several international artist residencies. She was an artist-in-residence at the Jan van Eyck Academie (Maastricht, 2020–2021), Tokyo Arts and Space (Tokyo, 2018), ROSE Residency (Bologna, 2021), and Vasl Artists’ Association (Karachi, 2023).

== Publications ==
- The Falcon of Karachi (Milan: Mousse Publishing, 2024) includes conversations with Elisa Caldana, Lucia Pietroiusti, and Salman Ali, and a text by Fahim Amir. ISBN 9788867496488.
- Times of Crisis (Bologna: Edizioni MAMbo, 2021) features a conversation between Elisa Caldana, Aki Nagasaka, and Giulia Pezzoli. ISBN 9788896296233.
- Never Again (Milan: Mousse Publishing, 2020) features texts by Charles Esche, Gareth Evans, and Mark von Schlegell, along with a conversation between Elisa Caldana, Diego Tonus, and Emanuele Guidi. ISBN 9788867494194.

== Collections ==
Caldana’s work is held in public collections including:

- MAXXI – Museo nazionale delle arti del XXI secolo (Rome)
- MACTE – Museo di Arte Contemporanea di Termoli
- MAMbo – Museo d'Arte Moderna di Bologna
- Städelschule Portikus e.V. (Frankfurt am Main)

== Awards ==
Caldana was the recipient of a grant from the Hessische Kulturstiftung. She was awarded funding from the Italian Council in 2019 and in 2023, and received the Kunstenaar Basis grant from the Mondriaan Fonds in 2022.
