= Mette Marie Rose =

Danish actress

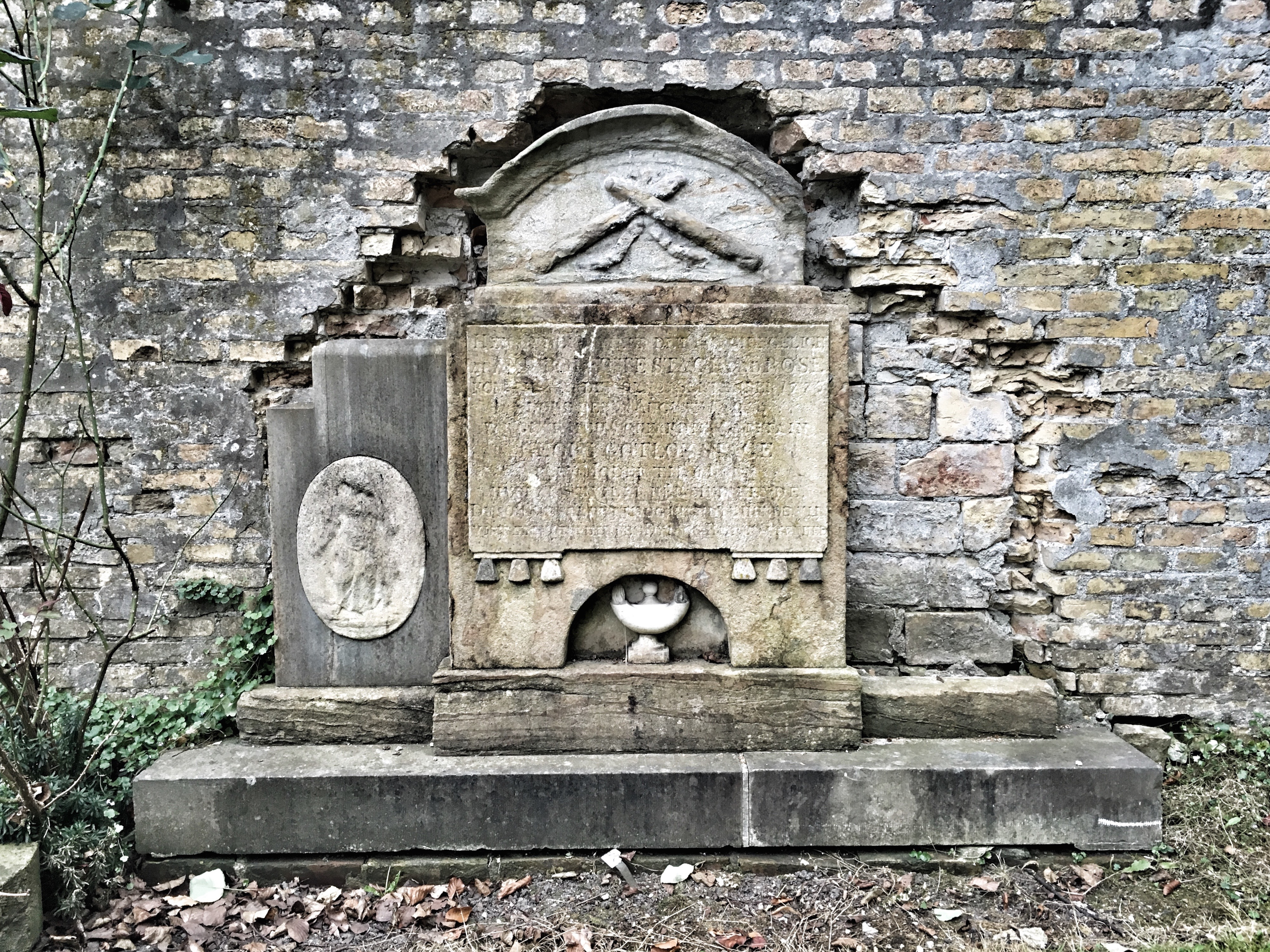
The presumed grave of Mette Marie Rose at Assistens Cemetery, Nørrebro, Copenhagen

Mette Marie Rose (c. 1745–1819) was a Danish actress. She was the central figure of a cause célèbre kidnapping when she was abducted by a nobleman from the theatre in 1765, which became a great scandal at the time.

She was the daughter of the actor Christopher Pauli Rose (1723–1784) and Gertrud Christensdatter (1722–1775). She made her stage debut as Mélite in Den gifte Filosof at the Royal Danish Theatre in Copenhagen in 1761.

During this time period, the profession of acting was compared to that of a prostitute, and after her performance as Bélise in the French comedy Vulcani Kjæp, Mette Marie Rose was abducted by Count Christian Conrad Danneskiold-Laurvig, while the friends of the count diverted her father's attention and then told him that his daughter had been taken by the count to his palace in Copenhagen. The case attracted great attention and became a scandal.

Her father reported the kidnap to the king, and because Mette Marie Rose was employed at the Royal Danish Theatre and therefore formally an employee at the king's household, the king accused the count of having offended his royal authority. Christian Conrad Danneskiold-Laurvig was forced to release Rose and was sentenced to fines and exile in Norway (where he was later involved in the elopement of Ingeborg Akeleye). This was an unusual case when a nobleman was judged guilty for a crime against a commoner. However, there are indications that Mette Marie Rose and her mother had been aware of the kidnap beforehand and consented to it.

Rose lost her position at the theater, was given a pension and a dowry and sent to a vicarage in the countryside to be educated in moral discipline. In 1774, she returned to Copenhagen and married Niels Schiørring (1743–1798), a musician at the royal chapel.
