= Hans Petersen =

Hans Petersen may refer to:

== Sports ==
- Hans Christian Petersen (ice hockey) (1937–2009), Norwegian ice hockey player
- Hans Petersen (boxer) (1930-2013), represented Venezuela at the 1956 Summer Olympics
- Hans Petersen (football) at Aarhus Gymnastikforening

== Others ==
- Hans Christian Petersen (1793–1862), Norwegian politician
- Hans W. Petersen (1897–1974), Danish film actor
- Hans Petersen, character in All I Desire
- Hans Petersen (judge) in Judges' Trial

== See also ==
- Hans Peterson (1922-2022), Swedish writer
- Hans Petersson (1902–1984), German mathematician
- Hans Pedersen (disambiguation)
