= Lars Johannesen Aga =

Norwegian politician

Lars Johannesen Aga (12 March 1800 – 7 August 1889) was a Norwegian politician.

Lars was elected to the Norwegian Parliament in 1842 and 1845, representing the rural constituency of Søndre Bergenhus Amt (today named Hordaland). He worked as a farmer and bailiff.
