= Betty Roose =

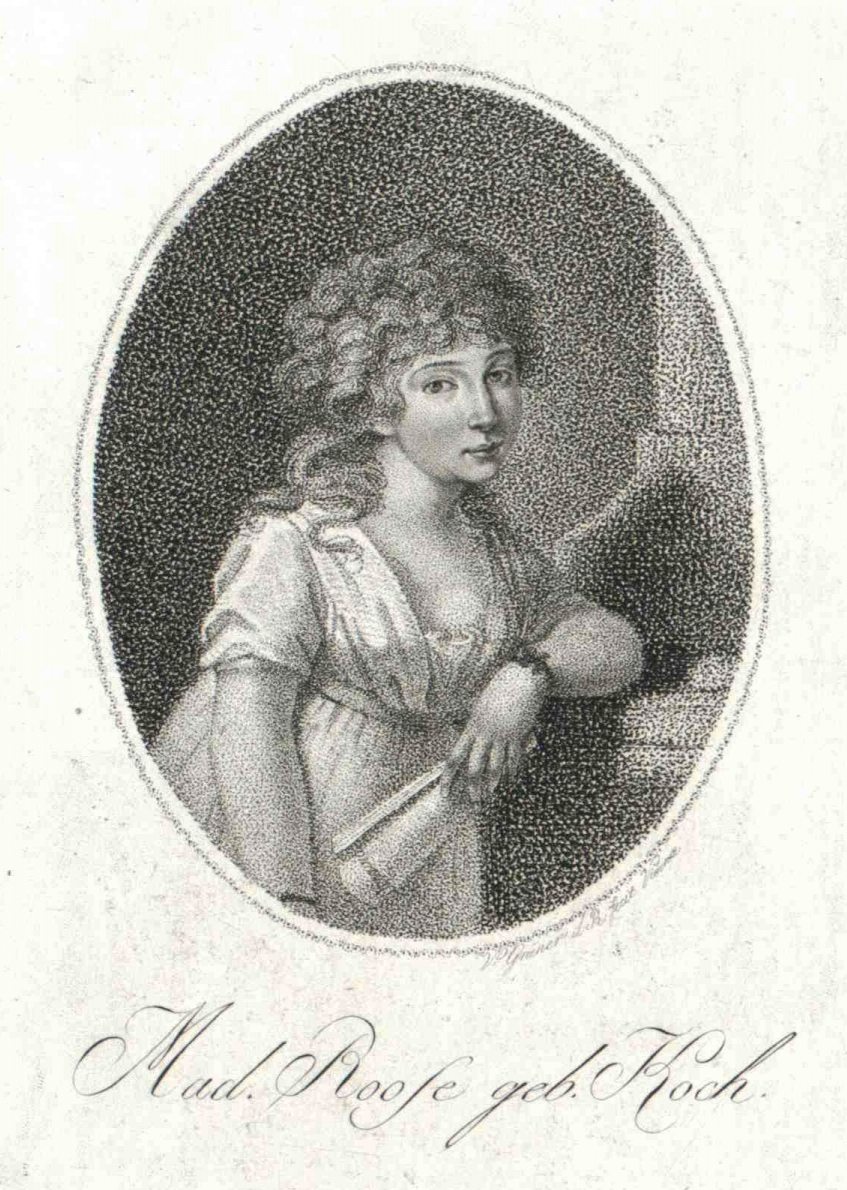
- Born: Elisabeth Eckardt; October 20, 1778; Hamburg, Germany
- Died: October 24, 1808 (aged 30); Vienna, Austria
- Spouse: Friedrich Roose (m. 1799–1808)

Betty Roose (born Elisabeth Eckardt, October 20, 1778 in Hamburg – October 24, 1808 in Vienna) was a German actress.

== Early life ==
Betty Roose was the oldest daughter of the actor and theater director Siegfried Gotthelf Koch (actually Eckardt, 1754–1831), who trained her in drama and acting. She started off her career at the age of 11, by participation in a stage show directed by her father, which was organized in Riga.

== Career ==
On 21 November 1793 she debuted at the Nationaltheater Mannheim and then played in Hannover, Hamburg and Bremen. In 1798, the actress from the Burgtheater director August von Kotzebue was appointed to Vienna. She gave her debut at the Burgtheater on September 28, 1798, in the role of Margarete in August Wilhelm Iffland's Die Hagestolz. Among her most famous roles was the title role from Iphigenie on Tauris. Subsequently, she played in other cities like Prague, Breslau, Regensburg and Pest.

== Personal life ==
In 1799 she married the actor and director Friedrich Roose (1767 - † 29 May 1818). Together they adopted a child.

== Death ==
Betty Roose died of an infection after the birth of a daughter. One week after the funeral, Betty Roose's skull was stolen by the same perpetrators who, half a year later, were to steal Joseph Haydn's skull from the neighboring goblet. During this time, Dr. Franz Joseph Gall's cranial and brain theory was at the height of European interest - especially the skulls of outstanding personalities were at the center of his desires.

== Legacy ==
1930 was Betty-Roose-Weg in the 12th district of Vienna Meidling named after her.
