= Jan van Eyck Academie =

Art academy in Maastricht, Netherlands

- Van Eyck – Multiform Institute for Fine Art, Design, and Reflection
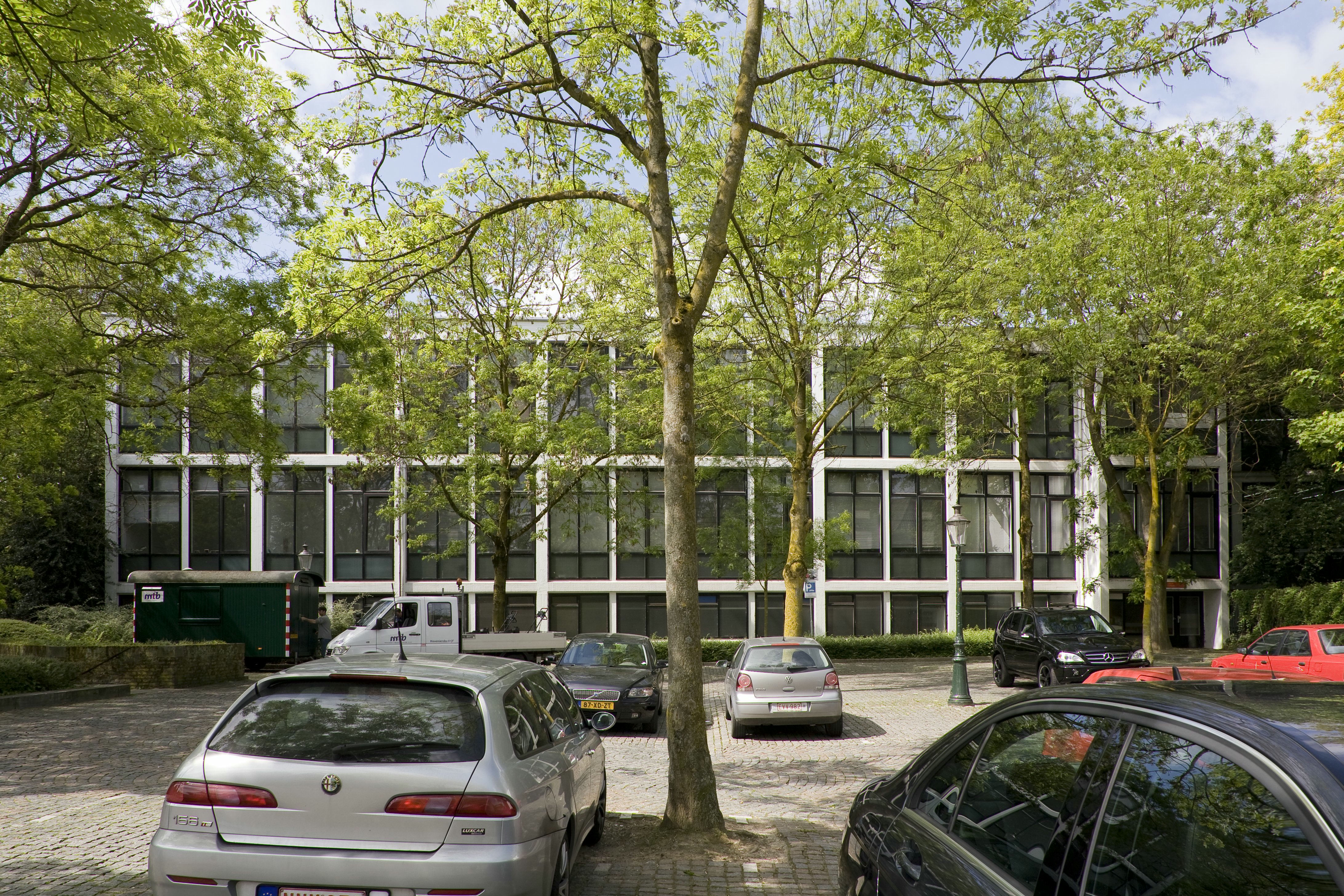
- Type: Post-academic art institute
- Established: 1948
- Dean: Hicham Khalidi (director)
- Students: 39 researchers (2013)
- Location: Maastricht, Netherlands; 50.8457°N 5.6866°E
- Website: https://www.janvaneyck.nl/

The Van Eyck – Multiform Institute for Fine Art, Design, and Reflection (formerly known as “Jan van Eyck Academie”) is a post-academic institute for research and production in the fields of fine art, design and art theory, based in Maastricht, Netherlands. The academy was established in 1948 and was named after the painter Jan van Eyck. In 2013, 39 researches from countries around the world were working and studying at the institutes premises in Jekerkwartier. In 2012, the Hubert van Eyck Academie / Caterina van Hemessen Academie was established as a ‘teaching bridge,’ linking the Jan van Eyck Academie / Margaret van Eyck Academie with Maastricht University and other Maastricht art schools.

== History ==
=== Beginnings (1947–1949) ===
In 1928, the priest Leo Linssen, the architect Alphons Boosten and the artist-writer Jan Engelman discussed the state of art in the province of Limburg, and the need for an art academy in the south of the Netherlands based on Roman Catholic principles. However, their ideas did not materialize at the time. Nearly two decades later, in December 1947, the Saint Bernulphus Foundation succeeded in establishing an institute for advanced education in fine art based on Catholic principles in Maastricht. The institute is named after the painter Jan van Eyck, born in Maaseik, not far from Maastricht, and considered a suitable role model for Catholic artists. The academy in Maastricht was originally conceived as a Catholic counterpart of the non-denominational Rijksakademie in Amsterdam, founded in 1870. The institute's main objectives were to further and expand art education in the broadest sense of the word, although the deed also clearly stipulated that the students should be trained in their art practice for tasks in the service of the Catholic Church, which involved the reconstruction, restoration and decoration of churches destroyed in the war. The academy was established as a private institute, subsidized by the state, the province of Limburg and local authorities.

On 13 May 1948, the feast of patron saint Servatius of Maastricht, the founding charter was signed by representatives of the Dutch Ministry of Education, Culture and Science, the Province of Limburg, the city of Maastricht, and the Roman Catholic Diocese of Roermond. This day has ever since been observed as the academy’s dies natalis. Classes started on 1 October 1948, with seven students enrolled; their numbers increased to fifteen in the course of the first academic year. Compulsory subjects included the history of art, iconography, theology and philosophy, liturgy, sources of Christian art, history of civilization and literature. However, the statement of principles stressed that contemporary art was vital as well to the academy's set-up. In November 1948, the priest Leo W. Linssen was assigned first director of the Jan van Eyck Academie. Linssen, in his opening speech referred to Van Eyck's Ghent Altarpiece as an example of 'Christian art'.

The Jan van Eyck Academie initially took up residence in the former Sepulchrine church and convent (Bonnefantenklooster) in the Jekerkwartier neighbourhood in the center of Maastricht. The rather derelict building with sparse natural light was shared with several other institutions. In 1949, the board decided that, as an applied art institution, the academy should incorporate the training of architects. Consequently, three curricula were set up: architecture, sculpture and fine art (i.e. monumental and decorative painting). Belgian sculptor Oscar Jespers was professor of sculpting (1949–56). Classes of theory, aesthetics and technical education – with a firm scientific basis – were compulsory. There were studios for ceramics and glass art, mosaics, plaster casting and goldsmithing. In 1951, the Jan van Eyck Academie moved to a 17th-century orphanage in Lenculenstraat (later to house the Maastricht Academy of Dramatic Arts).

=== Identity building (1950–1967) ===
On 21 July 1952, the first group of 15 students graduated. In 1954, professor J.J.M. Timmers, an eminent art historian and director of the Bonnefanten Museum, was appointed the academy's second director. His major task was to find the academy a new, suitable building, as well as to bring the academy up to equal level with the Rijksakademie in Amsterdam. Consultations concerning the latter soon ran aground because the board of governors insisted on the Jan van Eyck Academie remaining a private institute, based on catholic principles. Plans for a new building, designed by Modernist architect Frits Peutz were presented and approved. In June 1959, construction work began and in January 1961, staff and students moved into the new building – a building however that was but a third of the size of Peutz' original plan.

In 1965, Timmers resigned as director and was succeeded by Albert Troost. Teaching and advising staff by that time had changed considerably; ties with the Roman Catholic establishment had become looser and catholic principles were only moderately adhered to. Troost, together with Ko Sarneel, visited art institutes of higher education in Amsterdam, Antwerp, Düsseldorf and Brussels and studied their educational programs and methods. The two men drew a master plan that emphasized the Maastricht academy’s need for a clear statement of principles and a well-founded program. Education from now on was to match developments in contemporary art practices. Education was restricted to fine art; architecture was no longer part of the curriculum. Entry requirements became more rigid, a fact-finding year was introduced, and more visiting lecturers were employed. The new adage was that art education should be more individually directed: the student, his consciousness and questions were to feature centrally. When in 1966 the Dutch Minister of Culture, Maarten Vrolijk, opened a new wing adjacent to the existing building, he praised the Academie for being outstandingly fitted out: there was a studio for metal working, a welding workshop, a carving studio, a foundry for bronze molding, a pottery kiln and means were provided to work with new synthetic materials.

=== Goal setting (1968–1979) ===
The Jan van Eyck Academie's third decade brought about some dramatic changes. Subsidies had gradually increased over the years and there was more room for education, research and experiment. The departments of monumental art and applied art closed. Society had become more secular and there was less demand for stained-glass windows, murals and mosaics (mainly for churches). In order for the students to be trained as all-round experts in fine art, divisions between various disciplines were abolished. In 1969, the departments of theater, design and mixed media were set up. These were multi-disciplinary departments and as such perfectly tied in with the idea of doing away with divisions between disciplines. Students of the mixed media department could make use of the timber workshop, the welding shop, the photo studio, the darkrooms, the silk-screen print shop, the audio and video studio, and the foundry to produce a single work of art, an installation, a performance or an action.

In the 1970s, the idea took ground that an art institute should be a breeding ground for research and experiment, a sanctuary of innovation. After 1978, the institute, rather than a place of instruction, saw itself as a platform or workshop ('werkplaats'): a center where works of art are being manufactured, as well as a place for discussion, study and experiment. Accommodation, equipment, expert supervision and coaching were aimed to trigger new developments. Extra-curricular activities, work placements in the art milieu, and other projects reached beyond the Academie's community.

=== Internationalization (1980s) ===
In 1980, Ko Sarneel, became acting director and proposed a 5-year plan, which entailed an increase in the scope and quality of projects and manifestations for the public at large. Visual token of Sarneel's term of office are the round holes that still mark the building today. The artist John Körmeling, alumnus of Eindhoven University of Technology, transformed the building into an 'art factory' for twenty-four hours. The ribs and diagonals of this imaginary building were visualized within and through the existing one by means of laser beams that concurred high up in the sky.

Two years later, Ko Sarneel resumed his previous function as head of the mixed media department, and William Pars Graatsma became director. During his directorship the photography section became autonomous and an audio room and video studio were set up. In 1980, Scottish video pioneer Elsa Stansfield was asked to create a Time Based Media Department at the Jan van Eyck Academy, Maastricht. This was the first media department in a postgraduate academy in the Netherlands. She also started to build a video collection for the Academy.

When the Jan van Eyck Academie celebrated its 40th anniversary in 1988, architects Wiel Arets and Wim van den Bergh were asked by Mr Graatsma to translate the policy plan of the academy into architectural terms. 'Macchina Arte' was the name for the architectonic concept that was about a complex set of thoughts that converged in the concept of “machine”. By this time, the Jan van Eyck Academie had truly become an international platform for art. The majority of advising researchers and students were from abroad and English had become the language of communication.

=== Three disciplines (1990s) ===
The 1991 policy plan of the academy's new director Jan van Toorn described the Jan van Eyck Academie as an international post-graduate art center with three disciplines: fine art, design and art theory. During this period individual freedom, discourse and the wider cultural context were emphasized. The horizontal organizational structure of the institute ensured mutual interchange and interaction in the disciplines of architecture, sculpture, photography, graphics, painting, video-audio and mixed media. The Jan van Eyck Academie in the 1990s, can be described as a venue for practical and theoretical reflection on art and society that went beyond generally accepted values. “Researchers” (no longer students!) were expected to have attained a practical and theoretical level that allowed them to make contributions to discussions, to do research and to engage in multi- and trans-disciplinary activities.

In 1992, a computer workshop was set up and in 1995, the Jan van Eyck Academie was connected to the internet. By this time, there were seven professional technical studios/workshops in the building: the audio and video studios, the computer workshop, the print shop, the photo studio, and workshops for graphics, wood and other materials. The media center, including the library and archives, was enlarged. New research programs were set up (Transcultural Studies and Design & Media).

In 1998, Marianne Brouwer, former curator of sculpture of the Kröller-Müller Museum, was appointed director. In the autumn of 1999 Simon den Hartog, former director of the Gerrit Rietveld Academie and founder of the Sandberg Institute, became acting director. Sue Golding was head of the Art Theory department from 1998 to 2003.

=== Post-academic institute (2000–now) ===
In 2000, Koen Brams was appointed director of the Jan van Eyck Academie. The institute’s program, as indicated in the policy plan, was described as the sum of all research and production undertaken. A new artistic advisory structure was introduced: advising researchers of the three departments (fine art, design and art theory) carry out departmental tasks together. In every department a core team of advising researchers is active. They initiate and supervise research projects, but their tasks also include programming, selection, studio visits, lectures, seminars, presentations and institutional and policy matters. Since 2001, the academy's weekly program is accessible to the public; opening up the institute has invited more critical response.

The Jan van Eyck Academie today sees itself as a hotbed for talent development. Essential in the new organization is that the institute is an open meeting place for people: artists, thinkers, readers, curators, writers, designers, poets, dreamers, workers, and occasional passers-by. The institute offers high-standard artistic and technical advice in response to individual requirements. Researchers are invited to theorize, formulate and produce. Hallmark of research is its discursive character. The institute offers alternative views of research and production, for which a climate of involvement is paramount in which researchers, artistic and technical staff establish alliances, collaborations and networks that are both practical and conceptual. Researchers can make use of the facilities (‘Labs’) inside the institute: the Charles Nypels Lab / Anne Pétronille Nypels Lab (print workshop), the Heimo Lab / Luzia Hartsuyker-Curjel Lab (wood and metal workshop), the Werner Mantz Lab / Elsa Stansfield Lab (multimedia workshop), the Pierre Kemp Lab / Thérèse Cornips Lab (library and archives), the Jac. P. Thijsse Lab / Wilhelmina Minis-van de Geijn Lab (nature research), and the Food Lab.

After extensive renovations, the renewed building was reopened on March 27, 2013, and the institution was restructured by director Lex ter Braak: Under the umbrella term “Van Eyck” Jan van Eyck Academie / Margaret van Eyck Academie and Hubert van Eyck Academie / Caterina van Hemessen Academie as well as the (then five) Labs were integrated.

In April and May 2017, female names were officially added to the all-male names of the Van Eyck’s two academies and its five Labs.

As of October 1, 2018, curator Hicham Khalidi serves as director of Van Eyck.

== Hubert van Eyck Academie / Caterina van Hemessen Academie ==
On 25 January 2012, the Hubert van Eyck Academie was established as a post-academic institution aiming to develop teaching facilities in partnership with the faculty of Cultural and Social Sciences of Maastricht University and three Maastricht branches of Hogeschool Zuyd (Zuyd University of Applied Sciences): the Maastricht Academy of Dramatic Arts, the Maastricht Academy of Music and the Maastricht Academy of Fine Arts. Hubert van Eyck was Jan’s elder brother and taught Jan how to use oil-based paint. Just as research and education went together in their case, the Jan and Hubert van Eyck Academies are striving for the same objective. The Jan van Eyck Academie stands for project development, the Hubert van Eyck Academie for teaching. Through the Hubert van Eyck Academie it will be possible to set up PhD tracks for artists, in partnership with the European Graduate School in Saas Fee (Switzerland).

The collaboration between the various Maastricht art schools has already resulted in the I-Arts program of Maastricht University. In 2012, two I-Arts masters students spent a year at the Jan van Eyck Academie.

In May 2017, the alternative name Caterina van Hemessen Academie was added, paying homage to the homonymous Flemish Renaissance painter.

== Notable alumni ==
Notable alumni of the Jan van Eyck Academie include Marwa Arsanios, Mieke Bal, Elisa Caldana, Mariana Castillo Deball, Keller Easterling, Paul Elliman, Sara R. Farris, Ryan Gander, Mona Hatoum, Manjot Kaur, Bjarne Melgaard, Steve McQueen, Sarat Maharaj, and Yvonne Oerlemans.

== Bibliography ==
- Rita van den Boogaart-Boerdijk: De geschiedenis van de Jan van Eyck Academie te Maastricht. Maastricht, 1972.
- Octavian Esanu, Franziska Lesàk & Giselle de Oliveira Macedo (eds.): Unfortunately last Sunday afternoon somebody left the door open. Sittard, 2000.
- Ko Sarneel: De geschiedenis van de Jan van Eyck Academie. Maastricht, 1988.
- Policy plans and annual reports of the Jan van Eyck Academie (1988–2004).
- Hagen Verleger (ed.): Margaret van Eyck—Renaming an Institution, a Case Study (Volume One: Research, Interventions, and Effects). New York, 2018.
- Hagen Verleger (ed.): Margaret van Eyck—Renaming an Institution, a Case Study (Volume Two: Comments, Contexts, and Connections). New York, 2018.

== Gallery ==
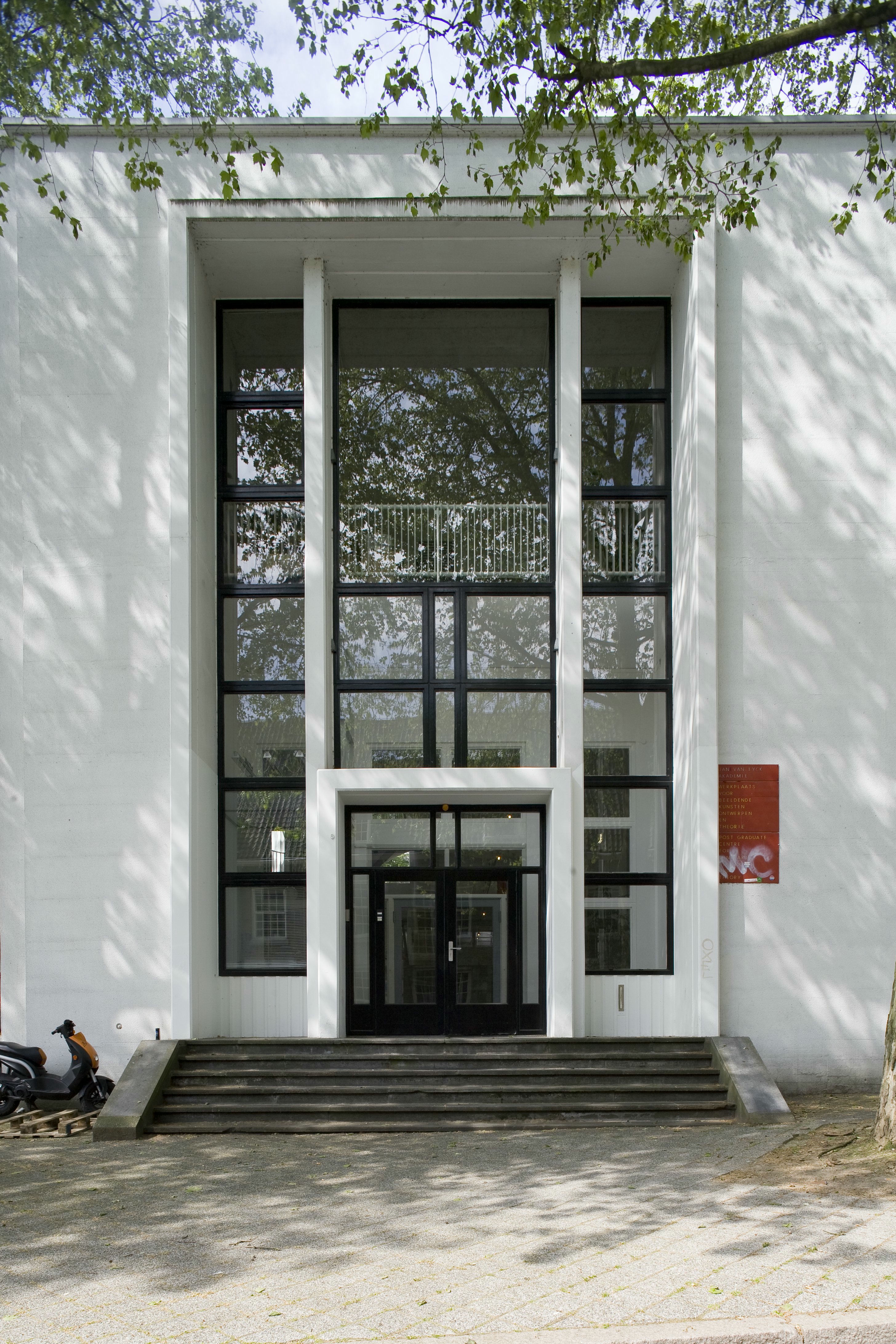
Main entrance Academieplein

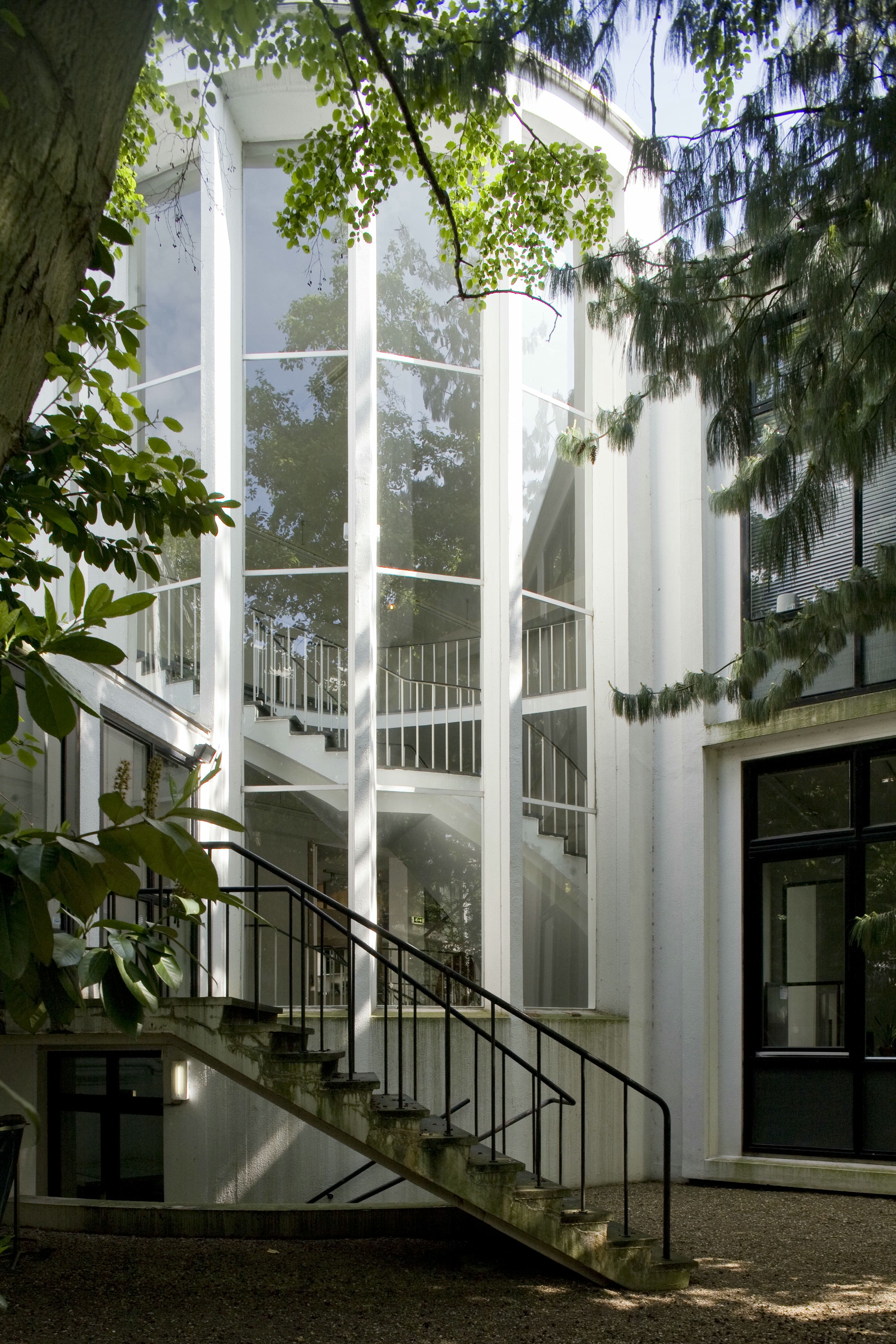
Entrance courtyard

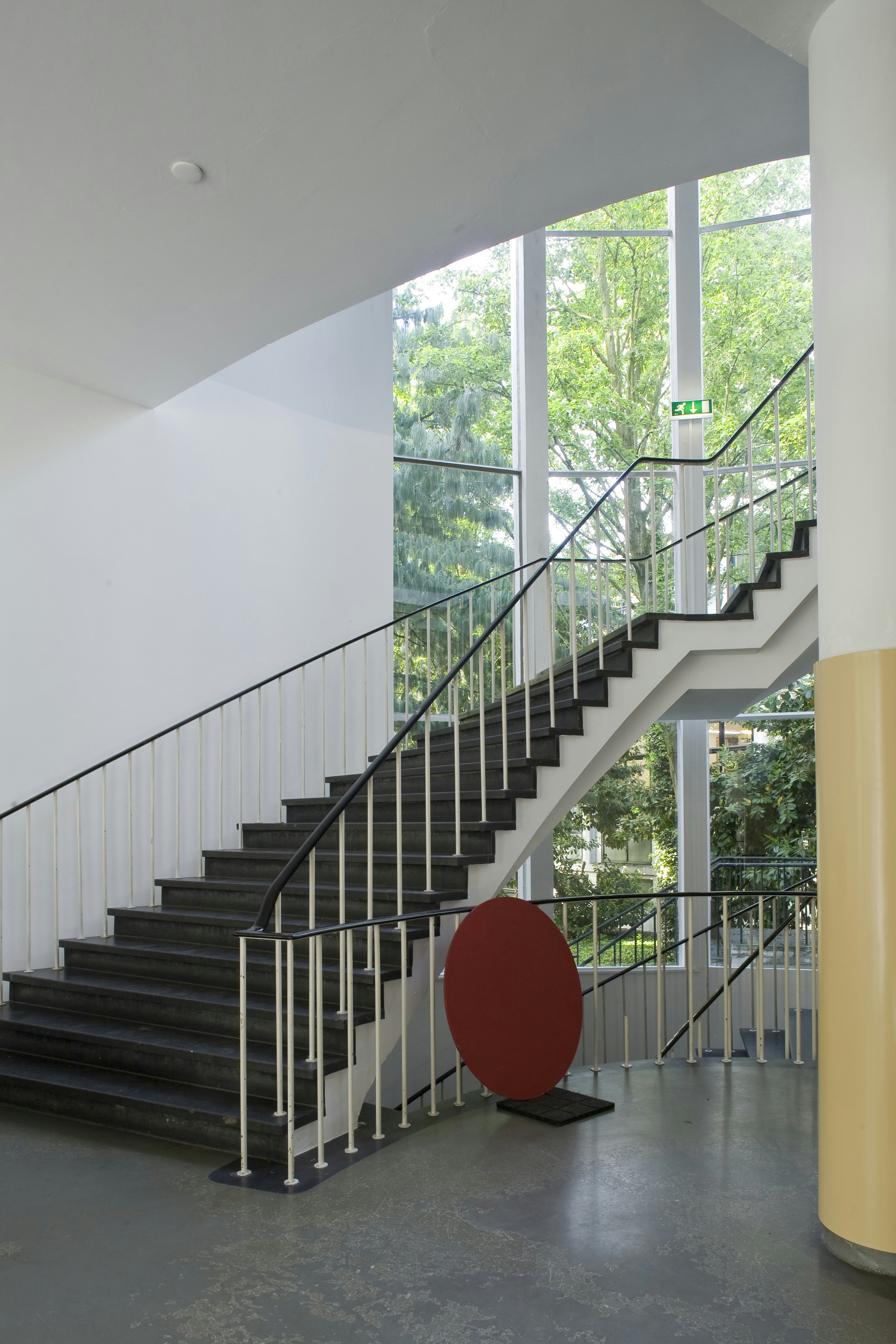
Staircase

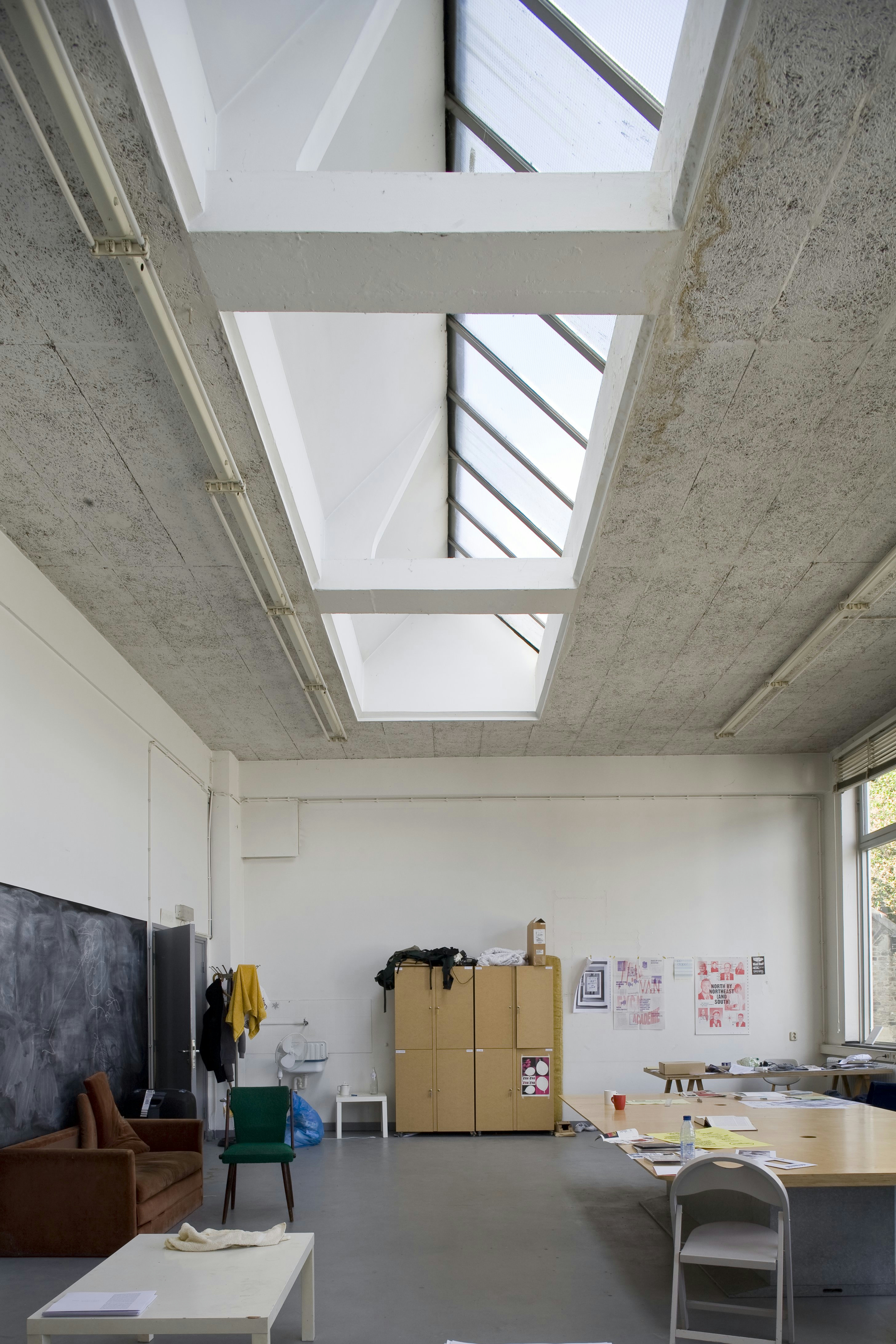
Studio space
