= Yvonne Oerlemans =

Dutch sculptor and video artist

Yvonne Oerlemans (31 December 1945 – 14 September 2012) was a Dutch sculptor and video artist who has been active in the field of video art, installations and objects since 1982. Oerlemans created a diverse oeuvre that has been exhibited worldwide. She studied at the Academy of Fine Arts in Hague (1974–79) and at the video workshop of the Jan van Eyck Academy in Maastricht (1983). In 1985 she was awarded a prize for her artistic career at the Aarhus International Video Festival & Competition. Oerlemans' early artworks deal with the human condition in a metaphorical and philosophical way. Her videos are characterized by a paradoxical sense of humor. The works are usually short, compact and mostly shot in a studio with a static camera.

== Video artworks and Performances ==
- 1980 Najaar '80
- 1981 Territorium
- 1982 Visions
- 1982 Inside - Outside
- 1983 Corsetscyclus
- 1983 Tempora mutantur et nos cum illis
- 1983 The turning point
- 1983 Administration
- 1984 Pa-Ma-Triachaat
- 1985 Changing landscape
- 1987 The Titanic
- 1987 Postcards
- 1988 De appeleters
- 1990 Brains
- 1992 Metamorphosis nature
- 1992 TV Chair (installation)
- 1993 Selevaren op de Zaan
- 1996 Crossing the Red Sea

== Exhibition ==
In 1991 she presented her solo exhibition at Artoteek Noord gallery, Amsterdam and in 2004 she participated in a group show "Farm" at Museum voor Moderne Kunst Arnhem - MMKA. Her works were mainly shown at international festivals, galleries, and museums in Europe and North America like the Audiovisual Experimental Festival(AVE), European Media Art Festival, Berlin International Film Festival, Imapkt Festival, Musée d'art contemporain de Montréal, Centre Pompidou, Stedelijk Museum Amsterdam. Her video artworks were also screened on TV programs in Europe, USA, and Canada.

== Distribution of video artworks ==
- LIMA, Amsterdam, the Netherlands
- 235 Media GmbH, Cologne, Germany
- EMAF, Osnabrück, Germany
- Vidéographe, Montréal, Canada
- Vtape, Toronto, Canada
- Art Com TV, San Francisco, USA

== Prize ==
- 1985 The first prize, International Video Festival & Competition, Aarhus, Denmark
- 1991 Festival Prize, International Film and Video Art Festival, Award of the town of Györ, Hungary

== Teaching ==
- 1987 Gast lecturer, Minerva Art Academy, Groningen, The Netherlands
- 1988 Lecture, San Francisco Art Institute, USA
- 1991-1992 Studio visit, St. JAM, Amsterdam, the Netherlands
- 1994 Lecture, Musée d'Art Contemporain Montréal, Canada
