= Ingeborg Akeleye =

Norwegian noblewoman and heiress

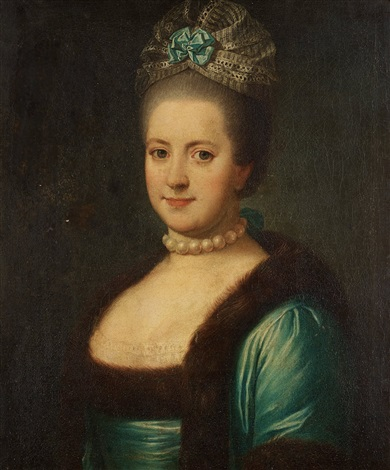
Ingeborg Akeleye by Jens Juel

Ingeborg Jensdatter Akeleye (May 13, 1741 – June 2, 1800) was a Norwegian noblewoman and heiress. She became known for her association with prominent men and her adventurous love life.

== Life ==
Ingeborg Jensdatter Akeleye was the daughter of Commander Jens Werner Akeleye (1703–1772) and Martha (Bruun) Akeleye (1710–1797). In 1763, her marriage was arranged with Herman Leopoldus Løvenskiold (1739–1799), who was a member of the Norwegian Løvenskiold noble family. She was described as a well-educated but demanding beauty, him as dissimilar, and their relationship was not happy.

In 1764, she met Danish nobleman Christian Conrad Danneskiold-Laurvig (1723–1783). He who was a grandson of Ulrik Frederik Gyldenløve, Count of Laurvig and founder of the city of Laurvig (modern-day Larvik Norway). In 1765, Danneskiold-Laurvig was exiled from Copenhagen to Larvik after his abduction of the actress Mette Marie Rose (1745–1819) from the Royal Danish Theatre. Ingeborg had a relationship with him resulting in her divorce in 1766. At her father's insistence, she received a settlement from Løvenskiold. Her father subsequently acquired royal consent as Ingeborg's guardian, but she escaped his authority and lived with different friends in Norway and Sweden. In 1767, a commission was set up to investigate her escape. With the help of Danneskiold-Laurvig, Ingeborg was declared of legal majority. She then lived with Danneskiold-Laurvig who in the meantime had become a widower. The couple began a prolonged cohabitation which ended in 1783 when Danneskiold-Laurvig died. In his will, Danneskiold Laurvig had bequeathed a settlement to Ingeborg.

She next married Swedish diplomat Carl Ingmann von Manderfeldt (1747-1813) who in 1778 had fled with accusations of embezzlement to Norway. The couple settled in Copenhagen in 1787. After the death of Ingeborg in 1800, Manderfeldt returned in Sweden where he died in 1813.

== See also ==
- Marie Grubbe
