= Jekerkwartier =

Coordinates: 50°50′39″N 5°41′29″E

- neighbourhood
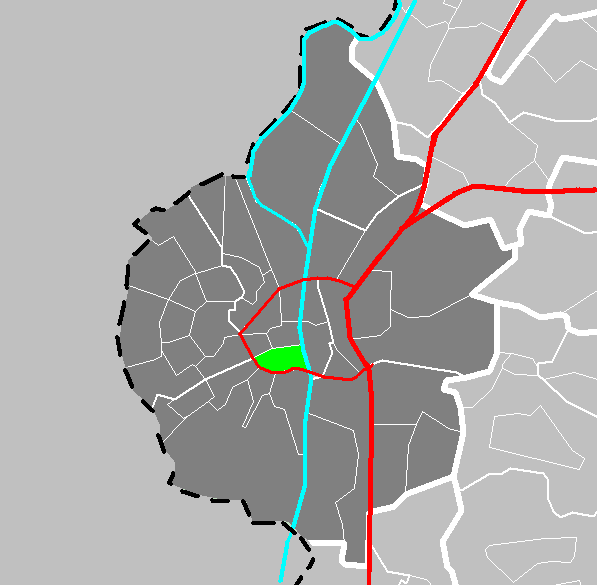
- Location of Jekerkwartier in Maastricht
- Municipality: Maastricht
- Province: Limburg
- Country: Netherlands

Population
  - Total: 1.541

The Jekerkwartier (Dutch: [ˈjeːkərkʋɑrˌtiːr]; Limburgish: Jekerkerteer [ˈjeːkəʀkəʀˌteːʀ]) is a neighbourhood in the old city centre of Maastricht, Limburg, Netherlands. It is named after the Jeker river that flows through the neighbourhood into the Meuse.

== Impressions ==
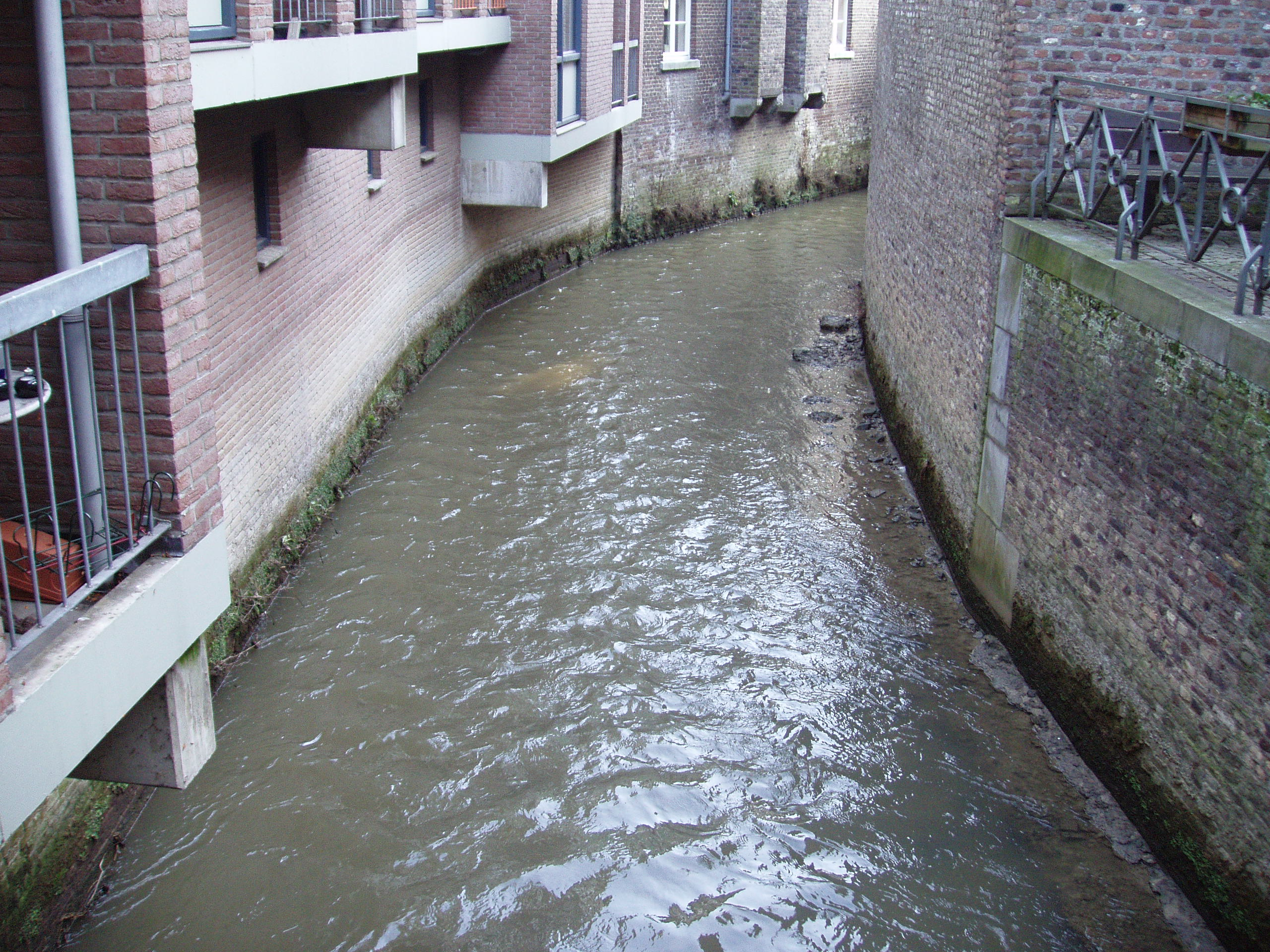
Jeker near the Bisschopsmolen

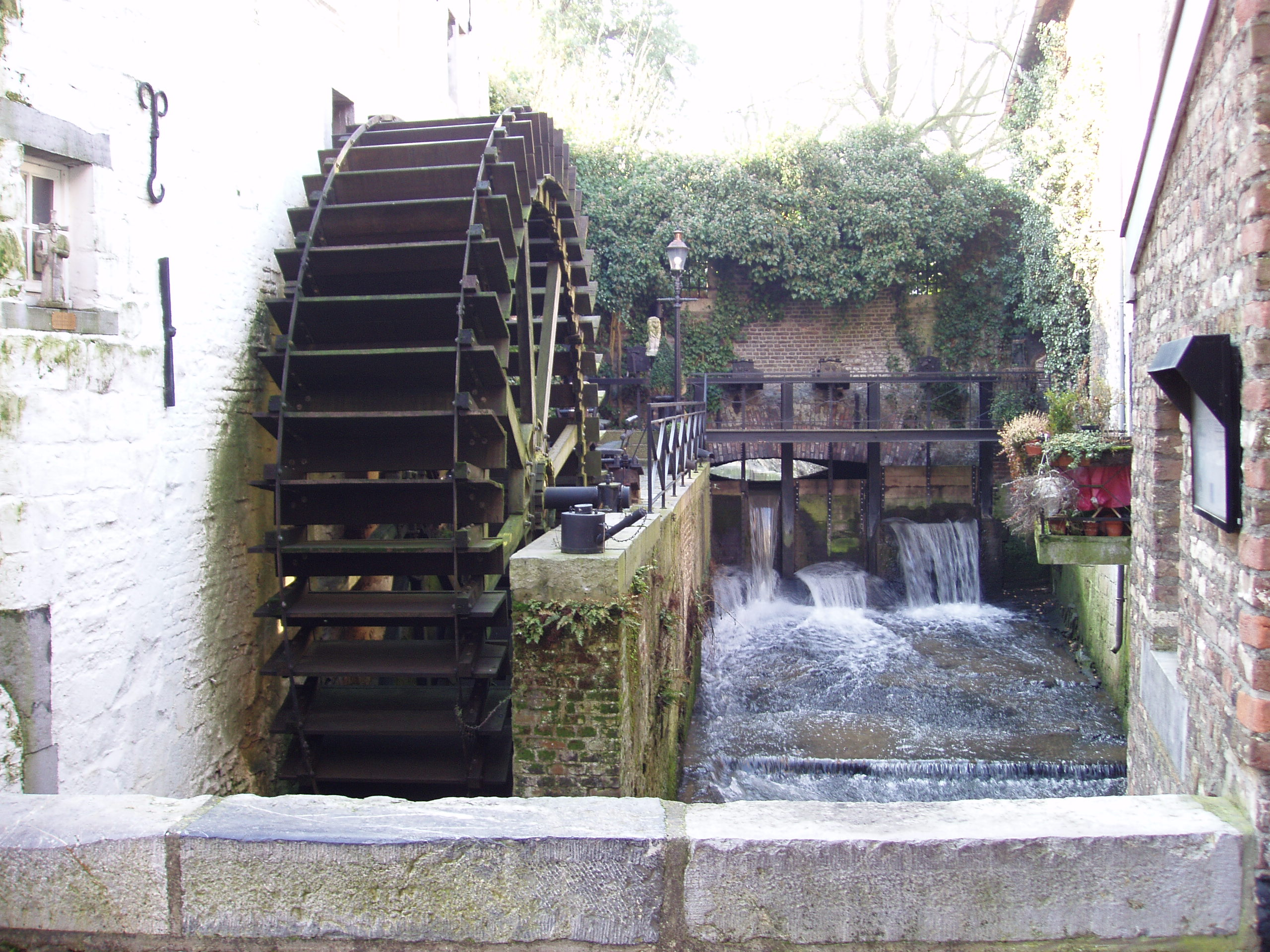
Leeuwenmolen

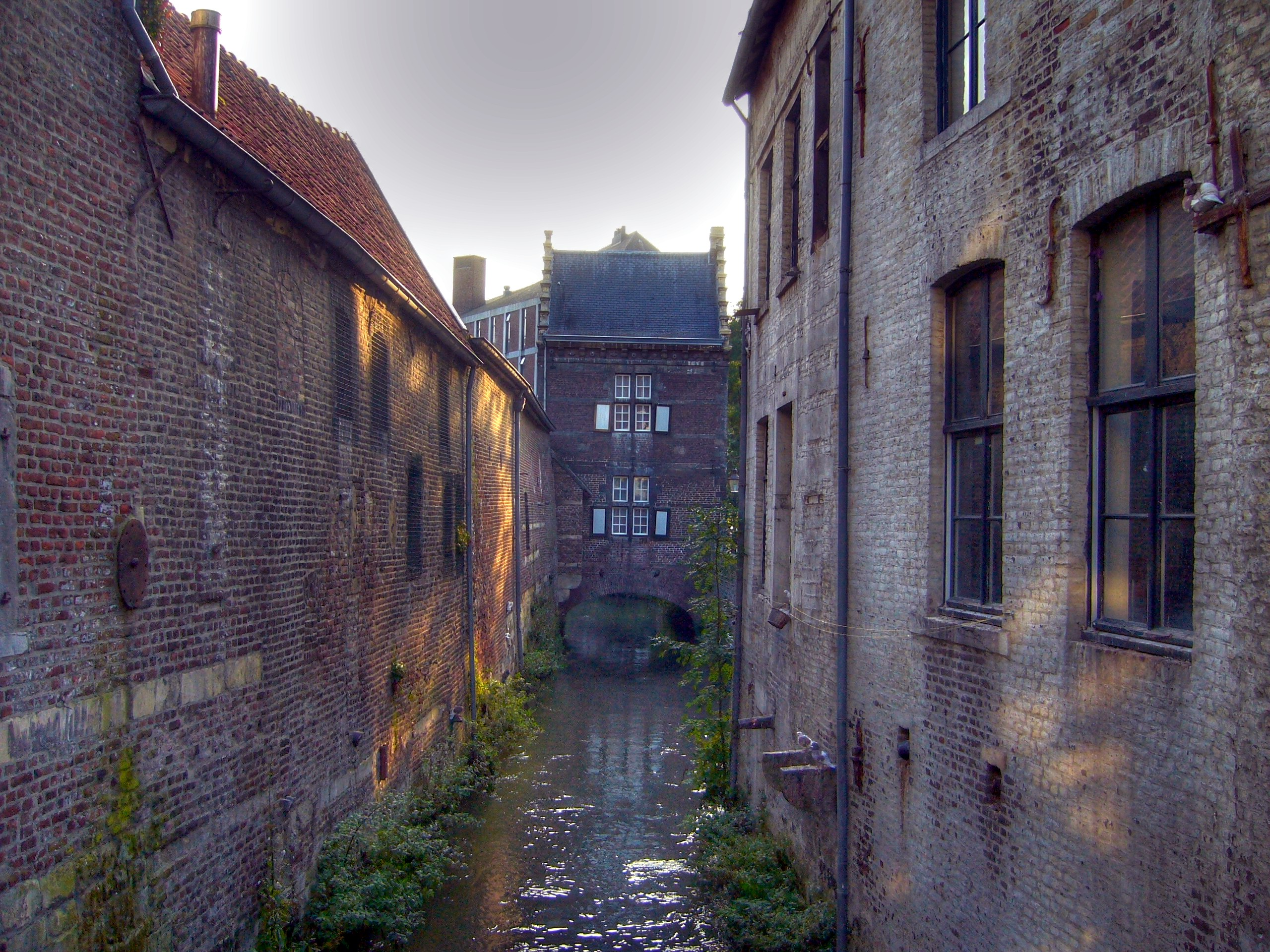
Huis op de Jeker

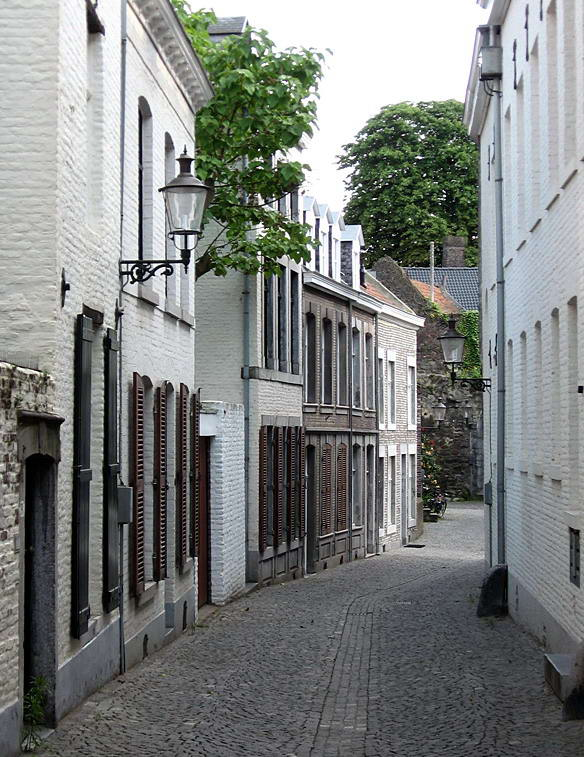
Typical street

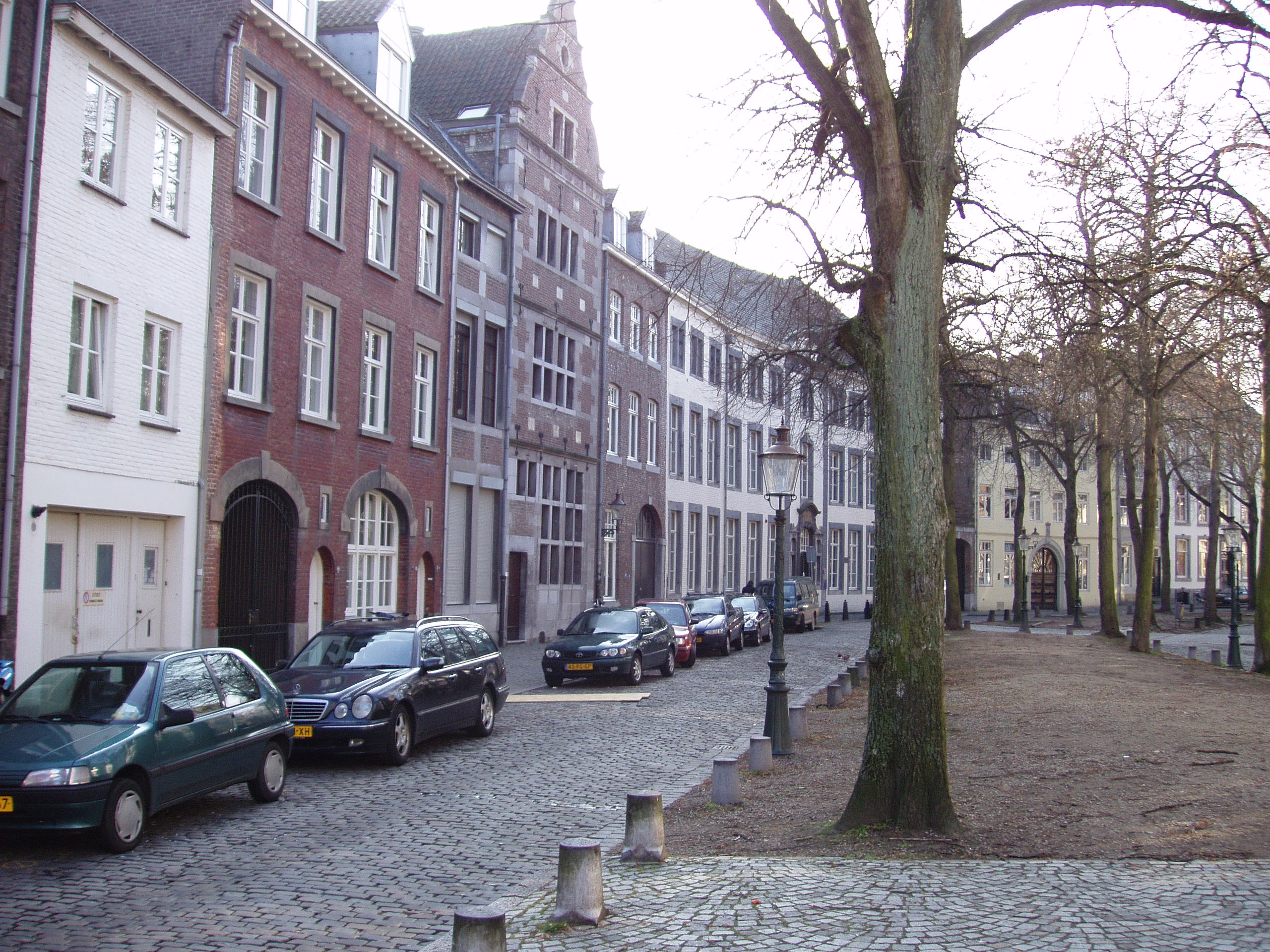
Grote Looiersstraat

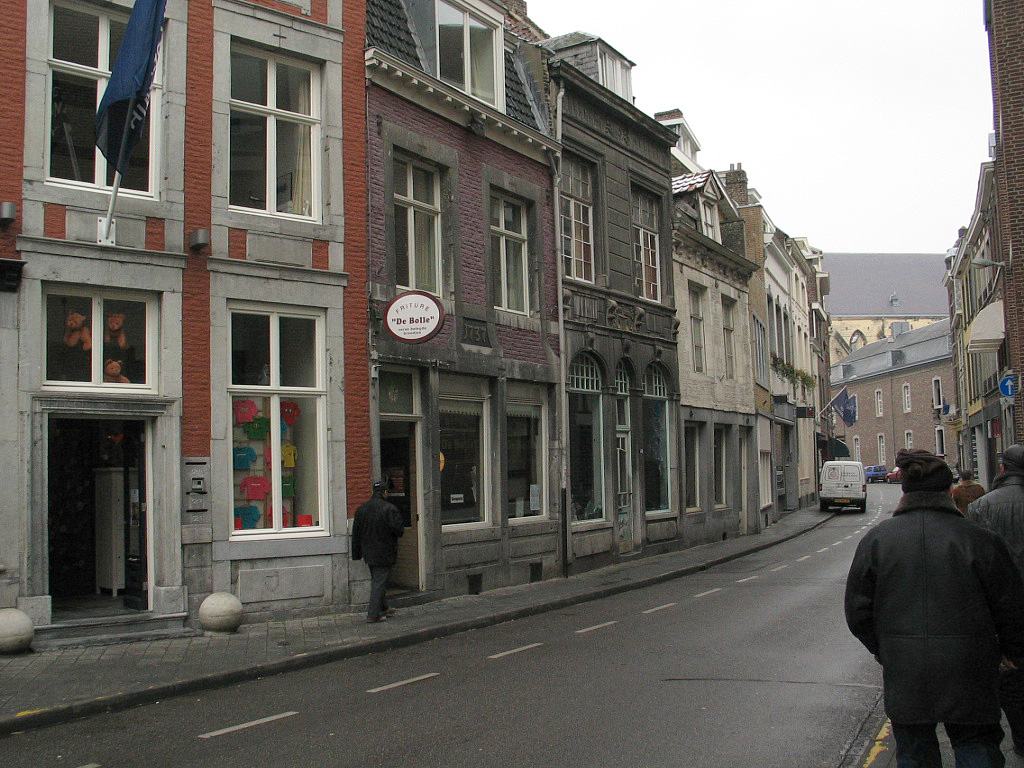
Sint Pieterstraat

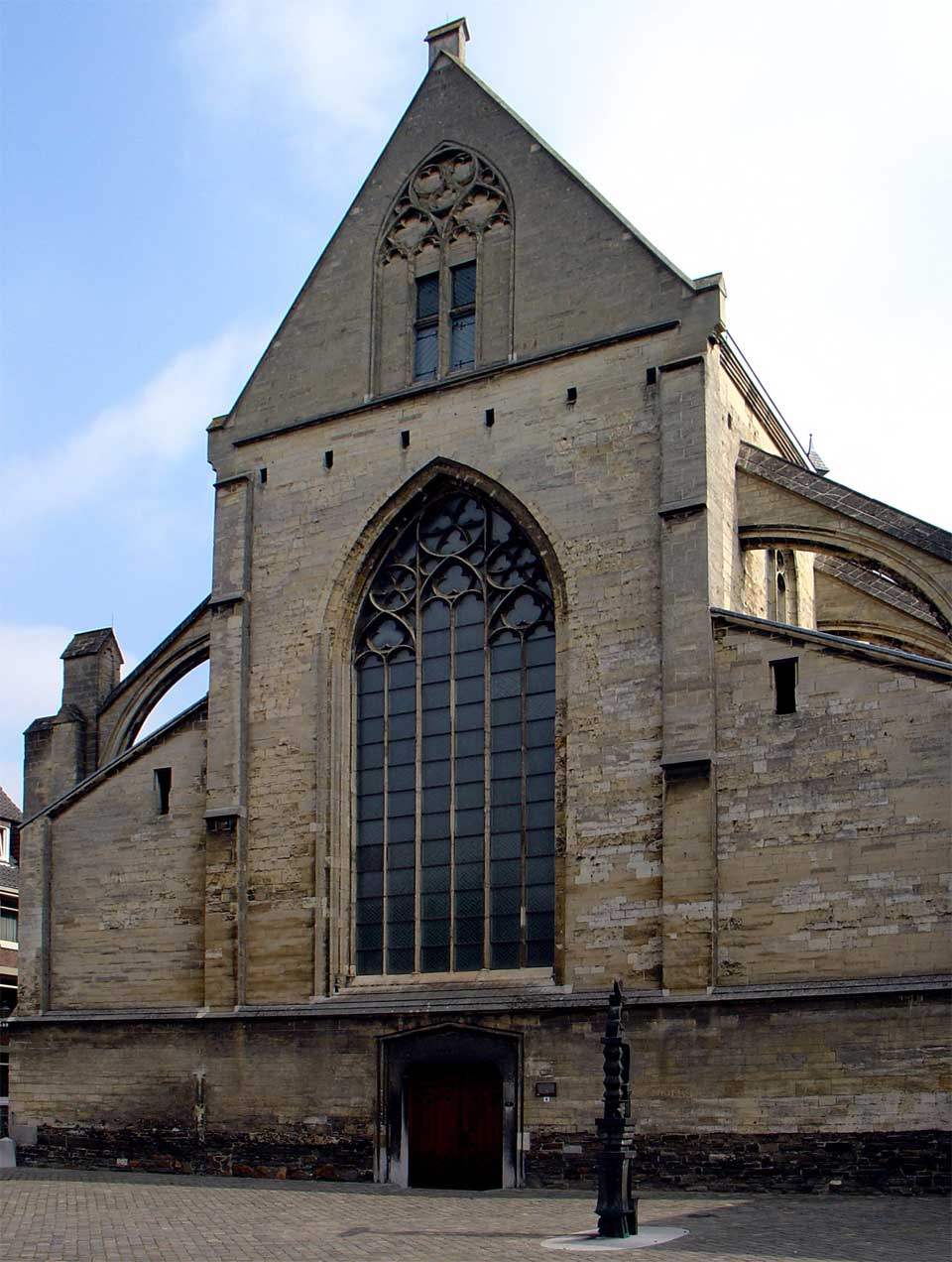
Oude Minderbroederskerk

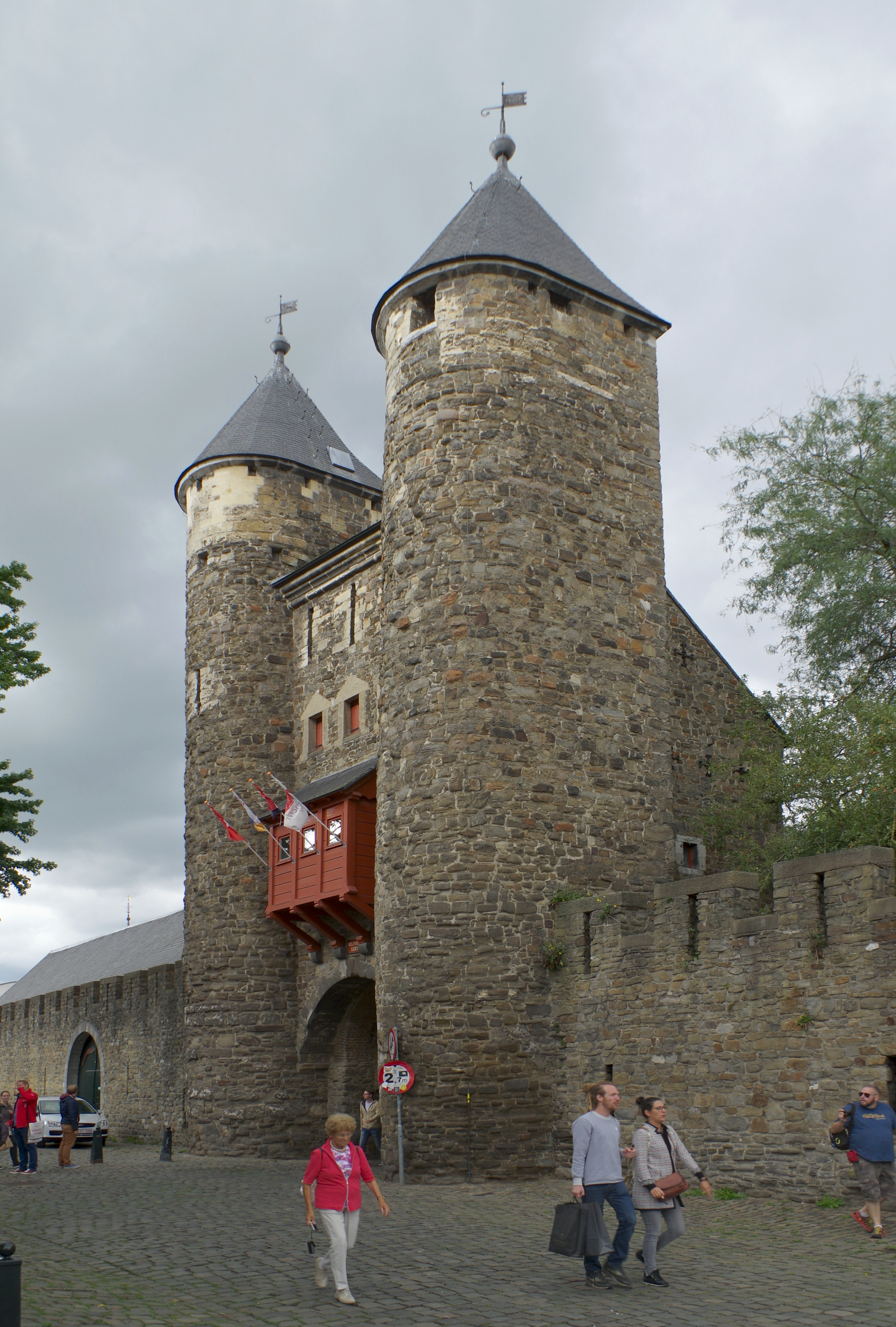
Helpoort

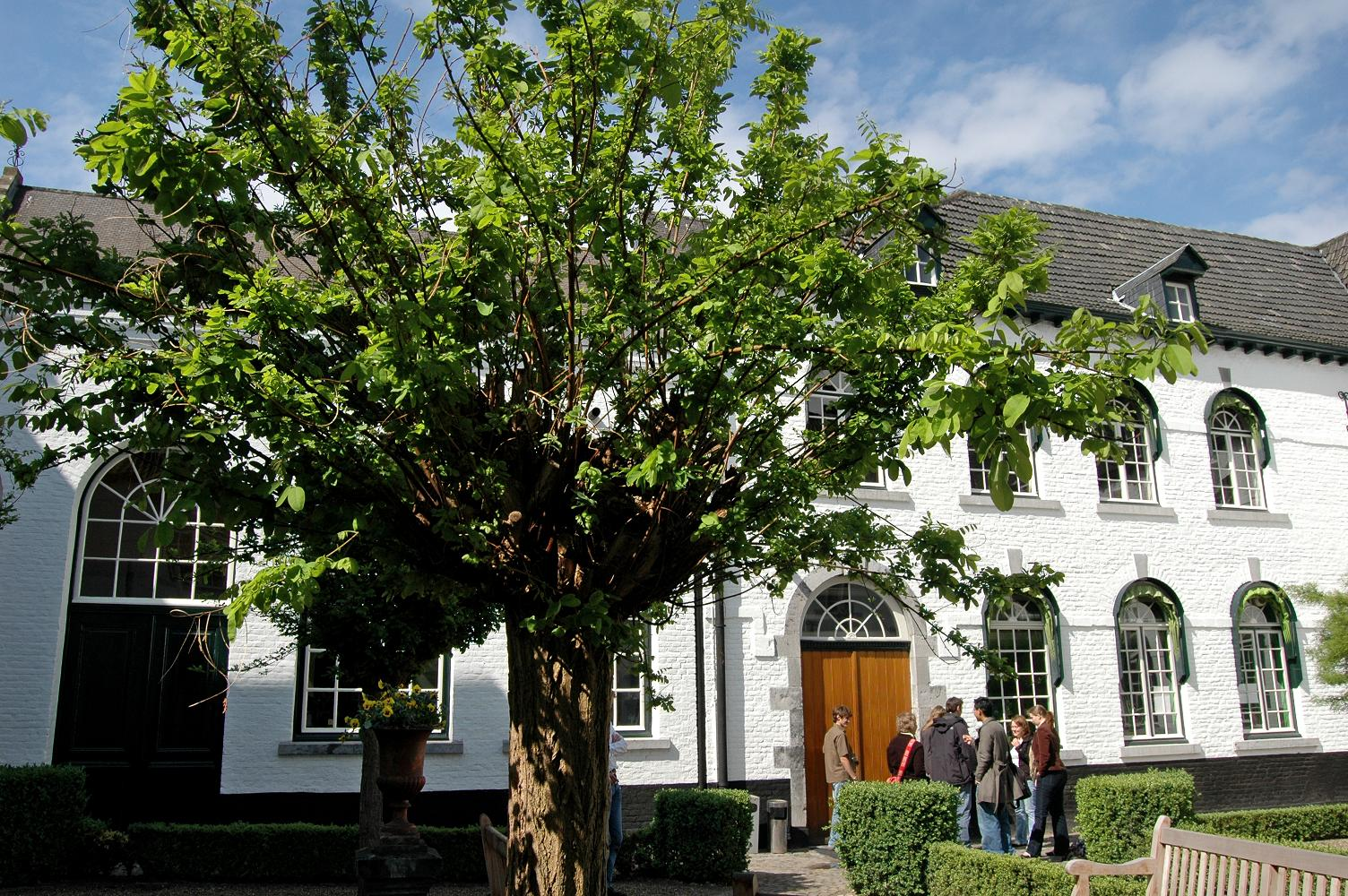
Nieuwenhof convent

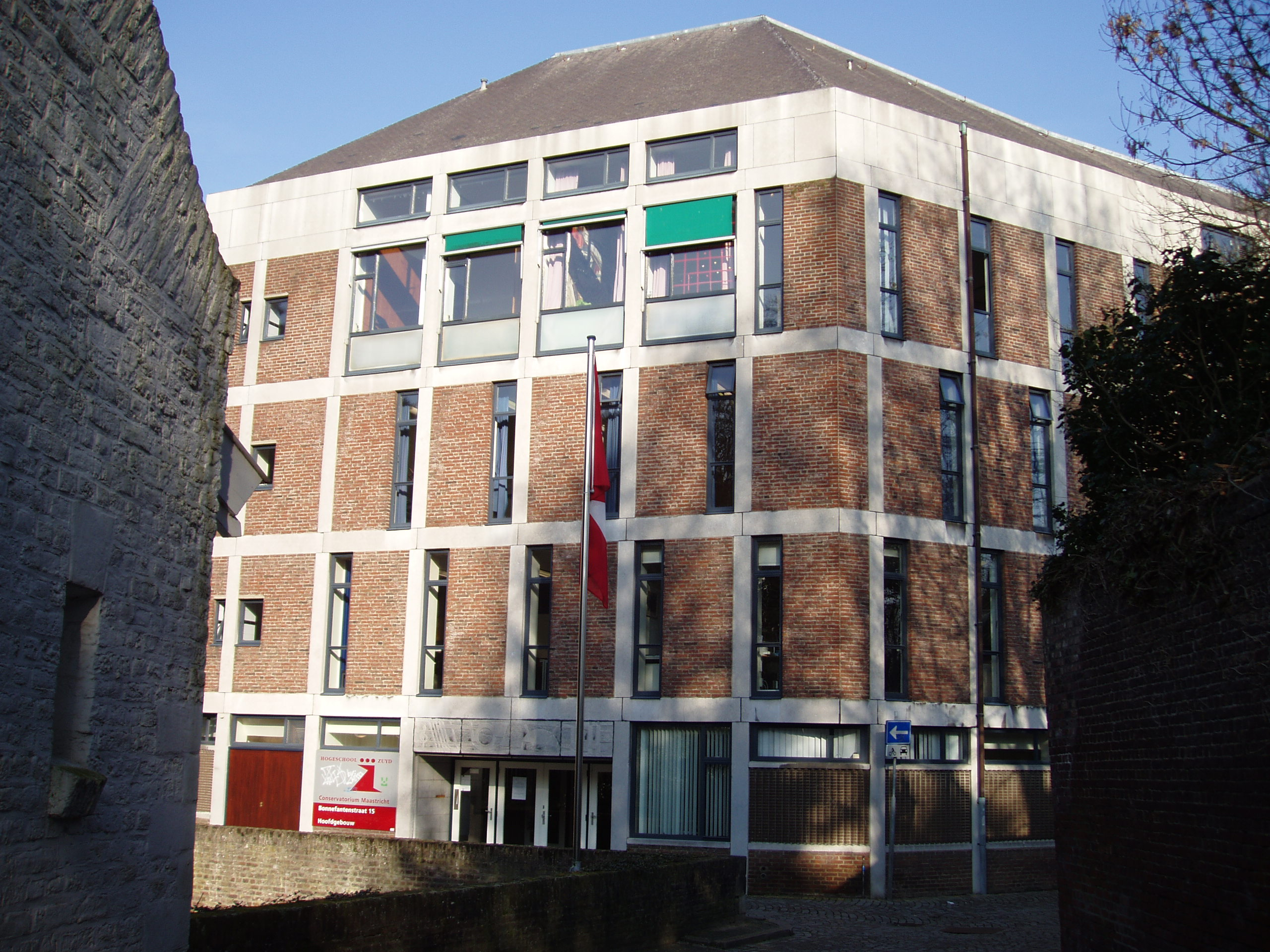
Conservatorium

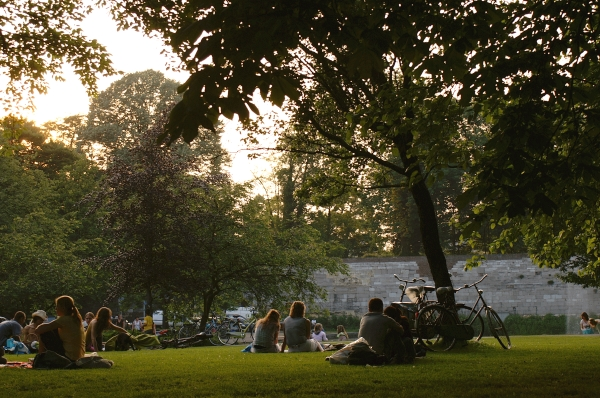
City park

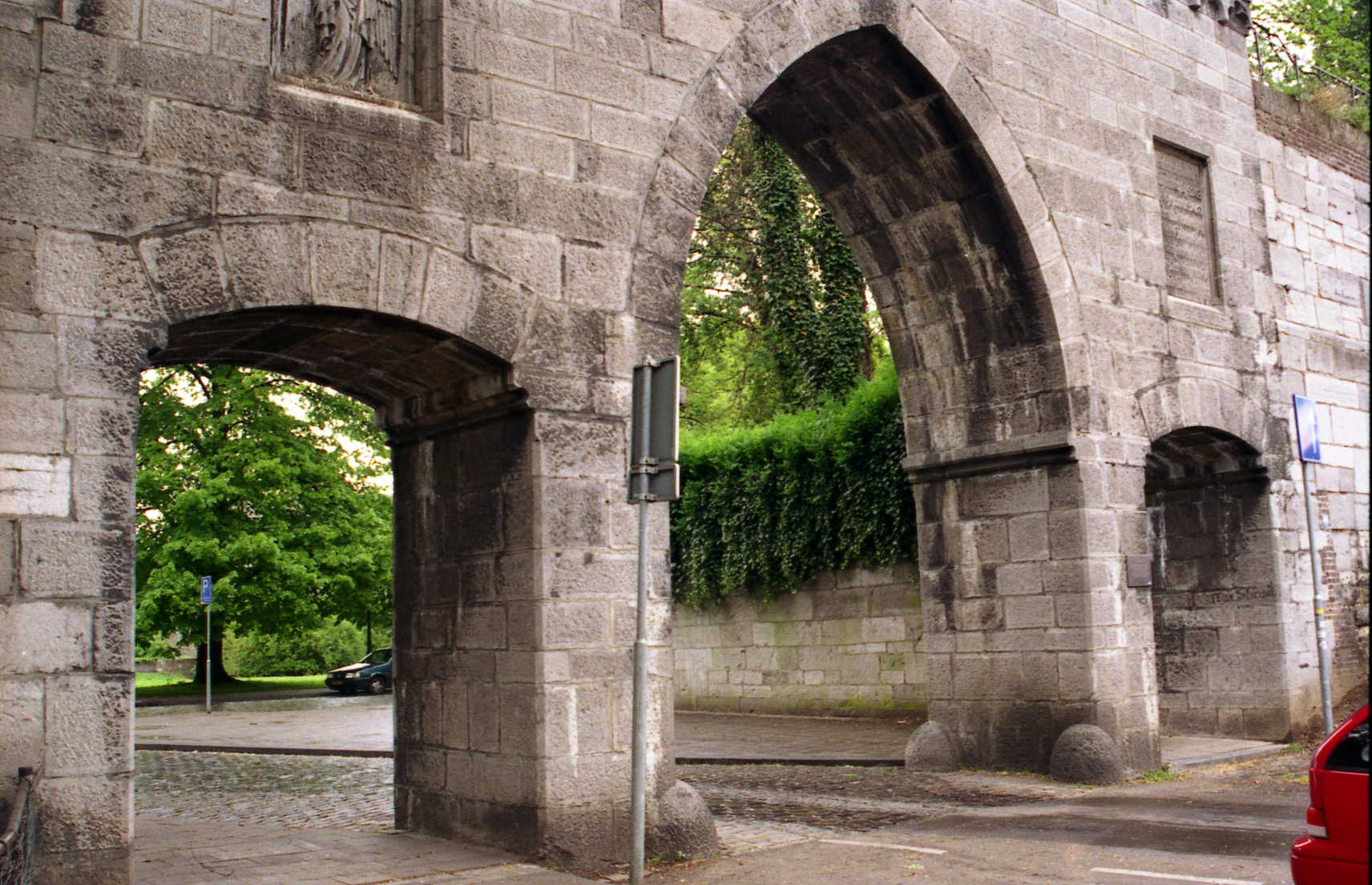
Poort Waerachtig

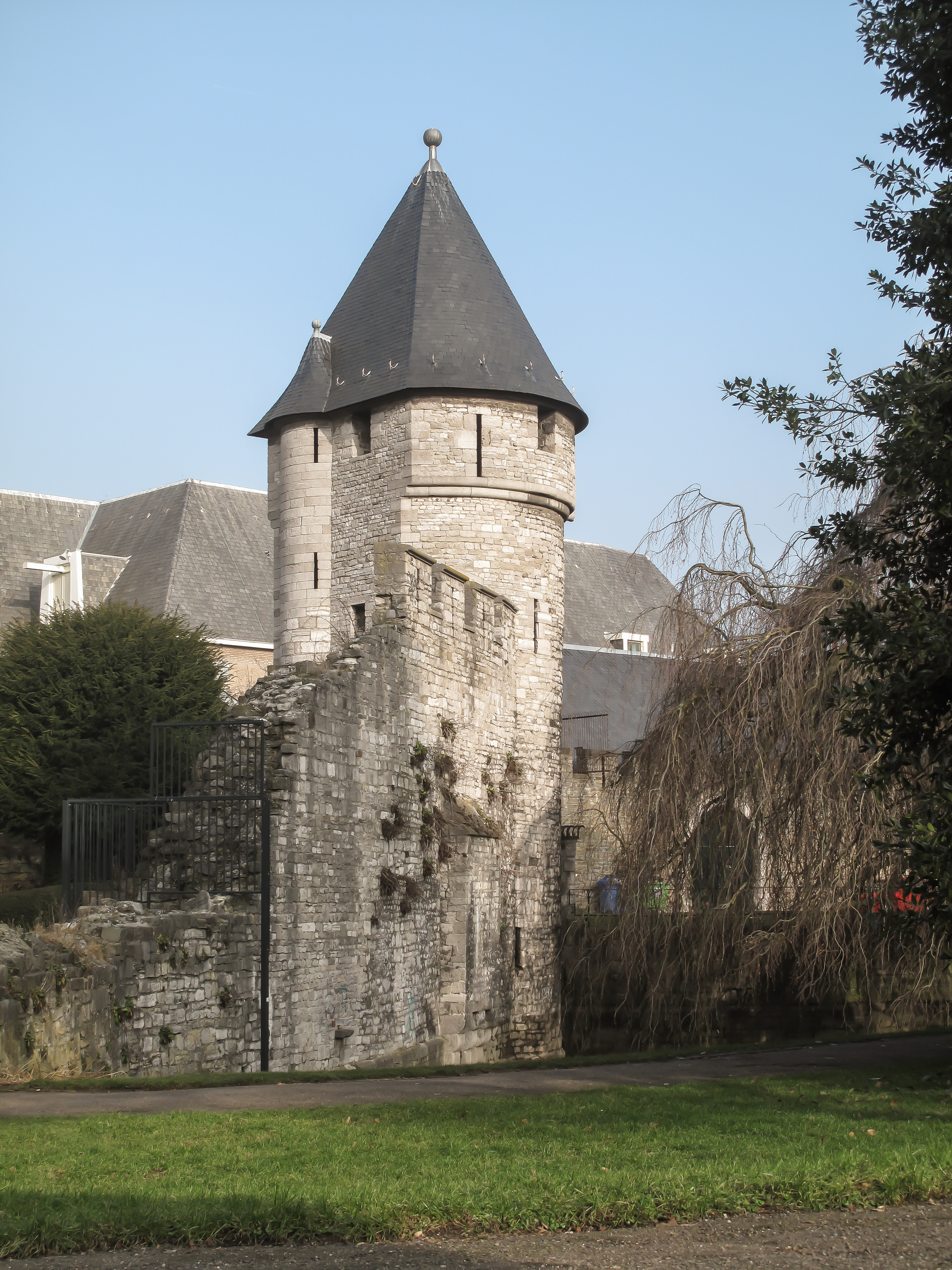
tower near the Faliezusterpark
