= Carl Roosen =

Norwegian cartographer and military officer

Carl Bonaparte Roosen (8 October 1800 – 15 February 1880) was a Norwegian cartographer and military officer.

He was born at Arendal in Nedenes, Norway. He was the son of merchant Herman Frøchen Roosen (1749–1829) and Johanne Dorthea Thestrup (1773-1838). He chose a military career and was a cadet at the Norwegian Military Academy from 1812 to 1816.

In 1815, he was appointed lieutenant in the Vesterlenske Regiment. He headed Trondhjems Ingeniørdetachement from 1845 until his retirement in 1870. As an engineer officer, Roosen was engaged with surveying. In 1824, he published his first topographical map of Norway. His cartographic works led to the publication of several maps that addressed Norway's geography. Skiing also caught his interest. In 1865, he published the book Om Skiløbningen, on the skill of skiing. Roosen was also interested in Norwegian history and he was particularly concerned with Nidaros Cathedral in Trondheim.

In 1849, he married Camilla Marie Thrane (1813-1897), daughter of a merchant banker David Thrane (1781-1832) and Helene Sophie Bull (1780-1831). Through his marriage, he became a brother-in-law of Marcus Thrane.
