= Hans Pedersen Herrefosser =

Norwegian politician (1800–1869)

Hans Pedersen Herrefosser (8 December 1800 – 4 August 1869) was a Norwegian politician.

He was elected to the Norwegian Parliament in 1842, representing the rural constituency of Smaalenenes Amt (today named Østfold). He worked as a farmer. He sat through one term.
