= List of glaciers in Nepal =

Glaciers are the jewel of Nepal. There are 3,252 glaciers in Nepal covering a total area of 5,323 km2. This is a list of glaciers of Nepal.

== Glaciers ==
Name	Province	Ref(s)
Langtang Glacier	Bagmati Province	
Lirung Glacier	Bagmati Province	
Thulagi glacier	Gandaki Province	
Ambulapcha Glacier	Koshi Province	
Hunku Glacier	Koshi Province	
Imja Glacier	Koshi Province	
Khumbu Glacier	Koshi Province	
Khumbu Icefall	Koshi Province	
Lhotse Shar Glacier	Koshi Province	
Nangpai Gosum Glacier	Koshi Province	
Ngozumpa glacier	Koshi Province	
Nupchu Glacier	Koshi Province	
Yamatari Glacier	Koshi Province	
