= List of glaciers =

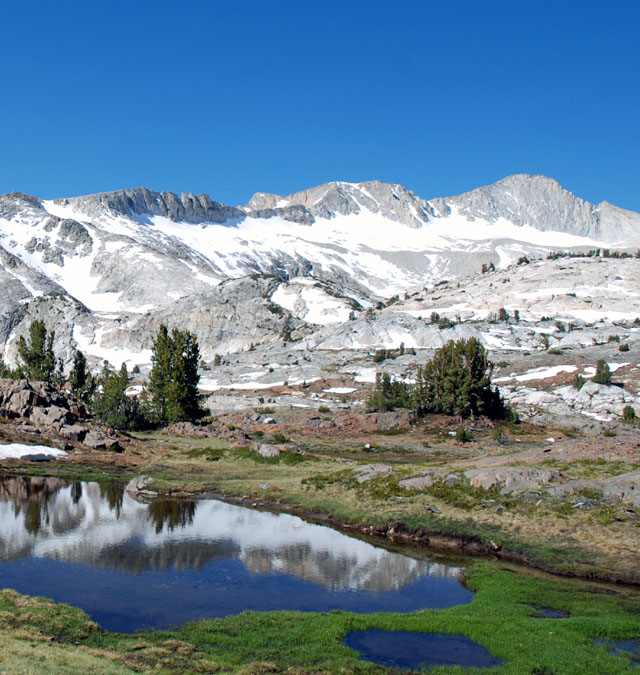
- Conness Glacier on Mount Conness

A glacier (US: /ˈɡleɪʃər/ GLAY-shər) or (UK: /ˈɡlæsiə/) is a persistent body of dense ice that is constantly moving under its own weight; it forms where the accumulation of snow exceeds its ablation (melting and sublimation) over many years, often centuries. Glaciers slowly deform and flow due to stresses induced by their weight, creating crevasses, seracs, and other distinguishing features. Because glacial mass is affected by long-term climate changes, e.g., precipitation, mean temperature, and cloud cover, glacial mass changes are considered among the most sensitive indicators of climate change. There are about 198,000 to 200,000 glaciers in the world.

Catalogs of glaciers include:

- World Glacier Inventory
- World Glacier Monitoring Service
- Global Land Ice Measurements from Space (GLIMS) Glacier Database
- Randolph Glacier Inventory (RGI)

== Glaciers by continent ==
=== Africa ===
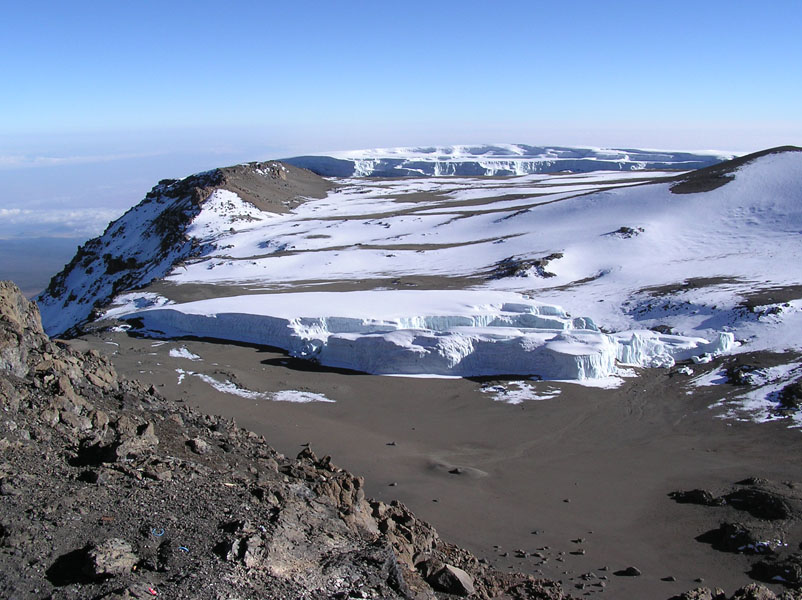
Furtwängler Glacier (foreground) as it appeared in August 2014. Behind the glacier are snowfields and the Northern Icefield.

Africa, specifically East Africa, has contained glacial regions, possibly as far back as the last glacier maximum 10 to 15 thousand years ago. Seasonal snow does exist on the highest peaks of East Africa as well as in the Drakensberg Range of South Africa, the Stormberg Mountains, and the Atlas Mountains in Morocco. Currently, the only remaining glaciers on the continent exist on Mount Kilimanjaro, Mount Kenya, and the Rwenzori.

=== Antarctica ===
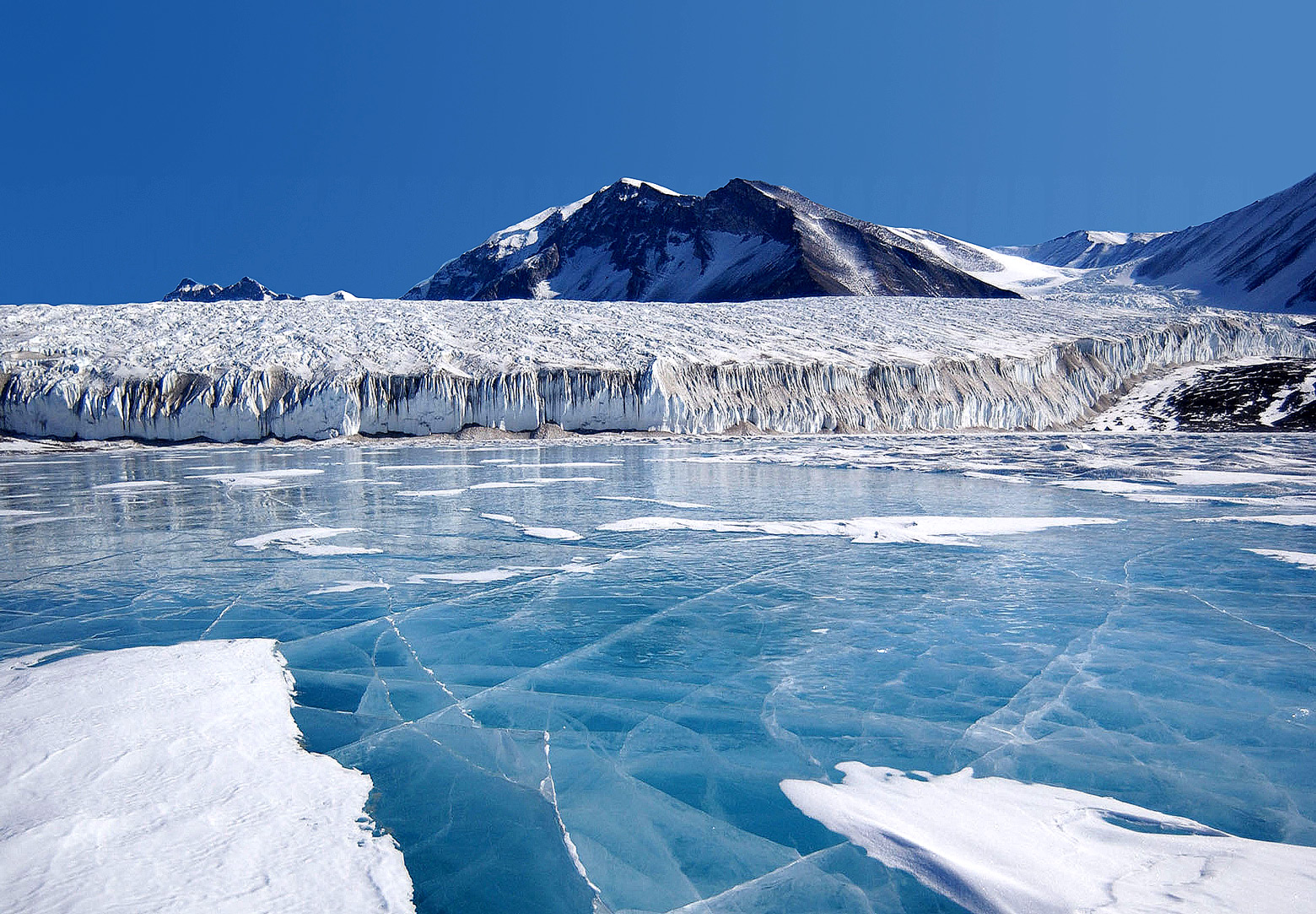
Canada Glacier in Antarctica

There are many glaciers in the Antarctic. This set of lists does not include ice sheets, ice caps or ice fields, such as the Antarctic ice sheet, but includes glacial features that are defined by their flow, rather than general bodies of ice. The lists include outlet glaciers, valley glaciers, cirque glaciers, tidewater glaciers and ice streams. Ice streams are a type of glacier and many of them have "glacier" in their name, e.g. Pine Island Glacier. Ice shelves are listed separately in the List of Antarctic ice shelves. For the purposes of these lists, the Antarctic is defined as any latitude further south than 60° (the continental limit according to the Antarctic Treaty System).

There are also glaciers in the subantarctic. This includes one snow field (Murray Snowfield). Snow fields are not glaciers in the strict sense of the word, but they are commonly found at the accumulation zone or head of a glacier. For the purposes of this list, Antarctica is defined as any latitude further south than 60° (the continental limit according to the Antarctic Treaty).

=== Asia ===
- List of glaciers in Bhutan
- List of glaciers in India
- List of glaciers in Nepal
- List of glaciers in Pakistan

=== Europe ===
The majority of Europe's glaciers are found in the Alps, Caucasus and the Scandinavian Mountains (mostly Norway) as well as in Iceland. Iceland has the largest glacier in Europe, Vatnajökull Glacier, that covers between 8,100 and 8,300 km^{2} in area and 3,100 km^{3} in volume. Norway alone has more than 2500 glaciers (including very small ones) covering an estimated 1% of mainland Norway's surface area. Several of mainland Europe's biggest glaciers are found here including; Jostedalsbreen (the largest in mainland Europe at 487 km^{2}), Vestre Svartisen (221 km^{2}), Søndre Folgefonna (168 km^{2}) and Østre Svartisen (148 km^{2}). The two Svartisen glaciers used to be one connected entity during the Little Ice Age but has since separated.

- List of glaciers in Iceland
- List of glaciers in Norway
  - List of glaciers in Svalbard
- List of glaciers in Russia
- List of glaciers in Switzerland
- Southernmost glacial mass in Europe

=== North America ===
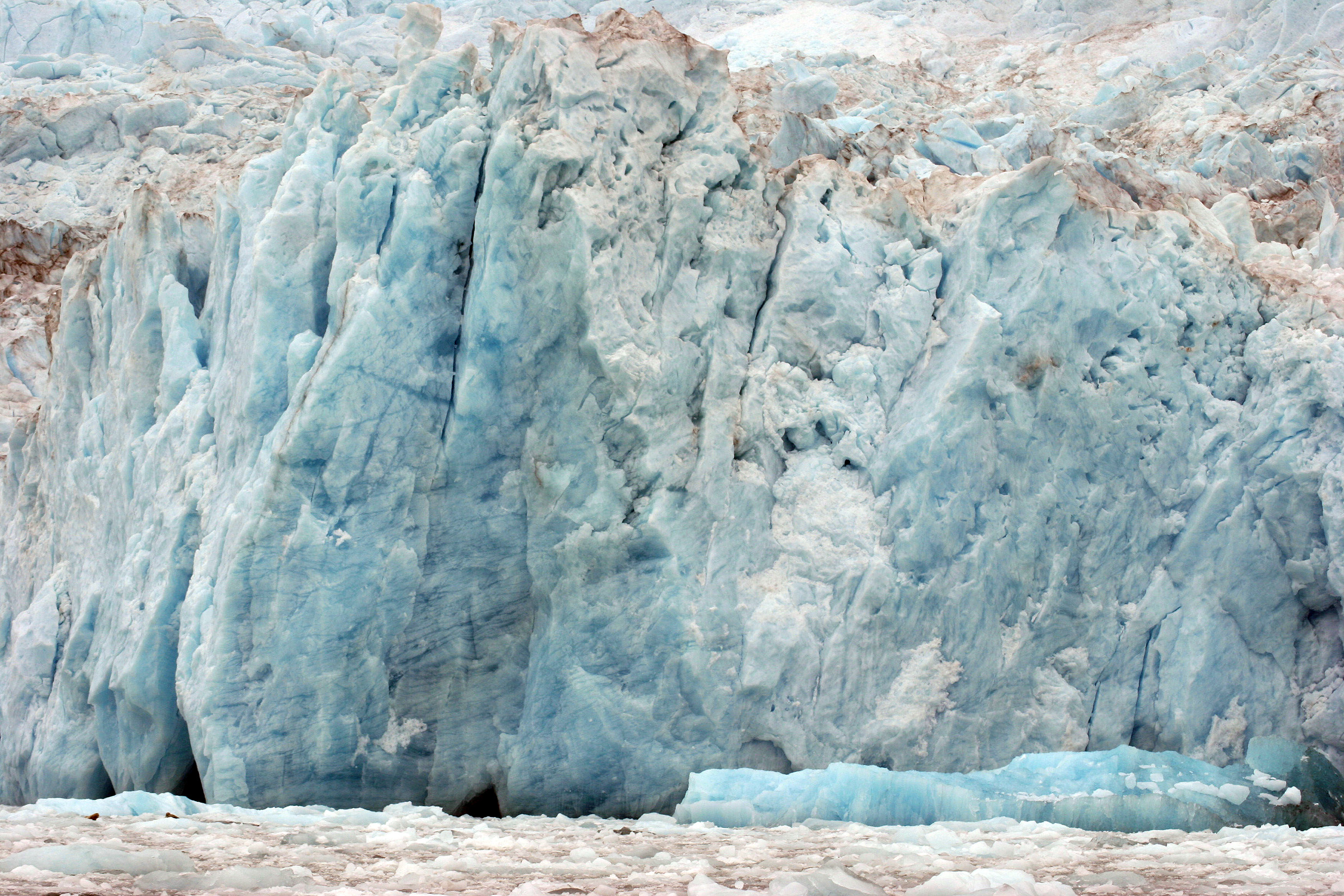
Chenega Glacier, an active glacier in Alaska

There are a number of glaciers existing in North America, currently or in recent centuries. In the United States, these glaciers are located in nine states, all in the Rocky Mountains or further west. The southernmost named glacier among them is the Lilliput Glacier in Tulare County, east of the Central Valley of California.

Mexico has about two dozen glaciers, all of which are located on Pico de Orizaba (Citlaltépetl), Popocatépetl and Iztaccíhuatl, the three tallest mountains in the country.

- List of glaciers in Canada
- List of glaciers in Greenland
- List of glaciers in Mexico
- List of glaciers in the United States

=== Oceania ===
Animated map of the extent of the glaciers of the Carstens Range from 1850 to 2003

No glaciers remain on the Australia mainland or Tasmania. A few, like the Heard Island glaciers are located in the territory of Heard Island and McDonald Islands in the southern Indian Ocean.

New Guinea has the Puncak Jaya glacier.

New Zealand contains many glaciers, mostly located near the Main Divide of the Southern Alps in the South Island. They are classed as mid-latitude mountain glaciers. There are eighteen small glaciers in the North Island on Mount Ruapehu.

An inventory of South Island glaciers compiled in the 1980s indicated there were about 3,155 glaciers with an area of at least one hectare (2.5 acres). Approximately one sixth of these glaciers covered more than 10 hectares. These include:

- Fox Glacier
- Franz Josef Glacier
- Hooker Glacier
- Mueller Glacier
- Murchison Glacier
- Tasman Glacier
- Volta Glacier

=== South America ===
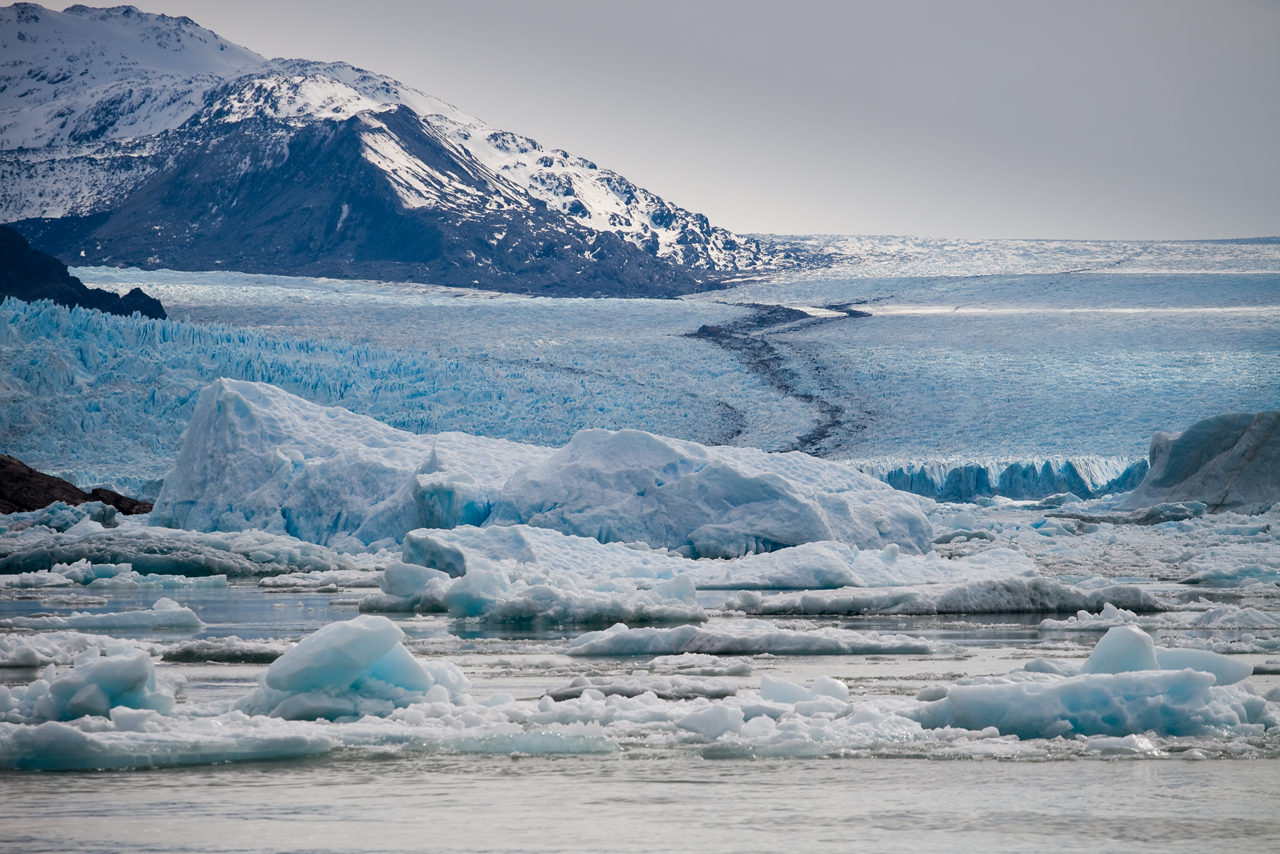
The Upsala Glacier in the Argentino Lake in Santa Cruz, Argentina.

Glaciers in South America develop exclusively on the Andes and are subject of the Andes various climatic regimes namely the Tropical Andes, Dry Andes and the Wet Andes. Apart from this there is a wide range of latitudes on which glaciers develop from 5000 m in the Altiplano mountains and volcanoes to reaching sealevel as tidewater glaciers from San Rafael Lagoon (45° S) and southwards. South America hosts two large ice fields, the Northern and Southern Patagonian Ice Fields, of which the latter is the second largest contiguous body of glaciers in extrapolar regions.

The glaciers of Venezuela are located in the mountains of the Sierra Nevada de Mérida. In 1910, maps made by the explorer Alfredo Jahn showed the Sierra Nevada glaciers covering about 1,000 hectares (2,500 acres). An ice trade at that time saw ice men or hieleros transporting glacier ice by mule or on foot to Mérida for sale, a six hour journey.

Venezuela's glacier coverage shrank to about 280 hectares (700 acres) in 1952, and 80 hectares (200 acres) in 1985.

The last remaining glacier, located on Pico Humboldt, was estimated to cover 10 hectares (25 acres) in 2011.

== Remote islands ==
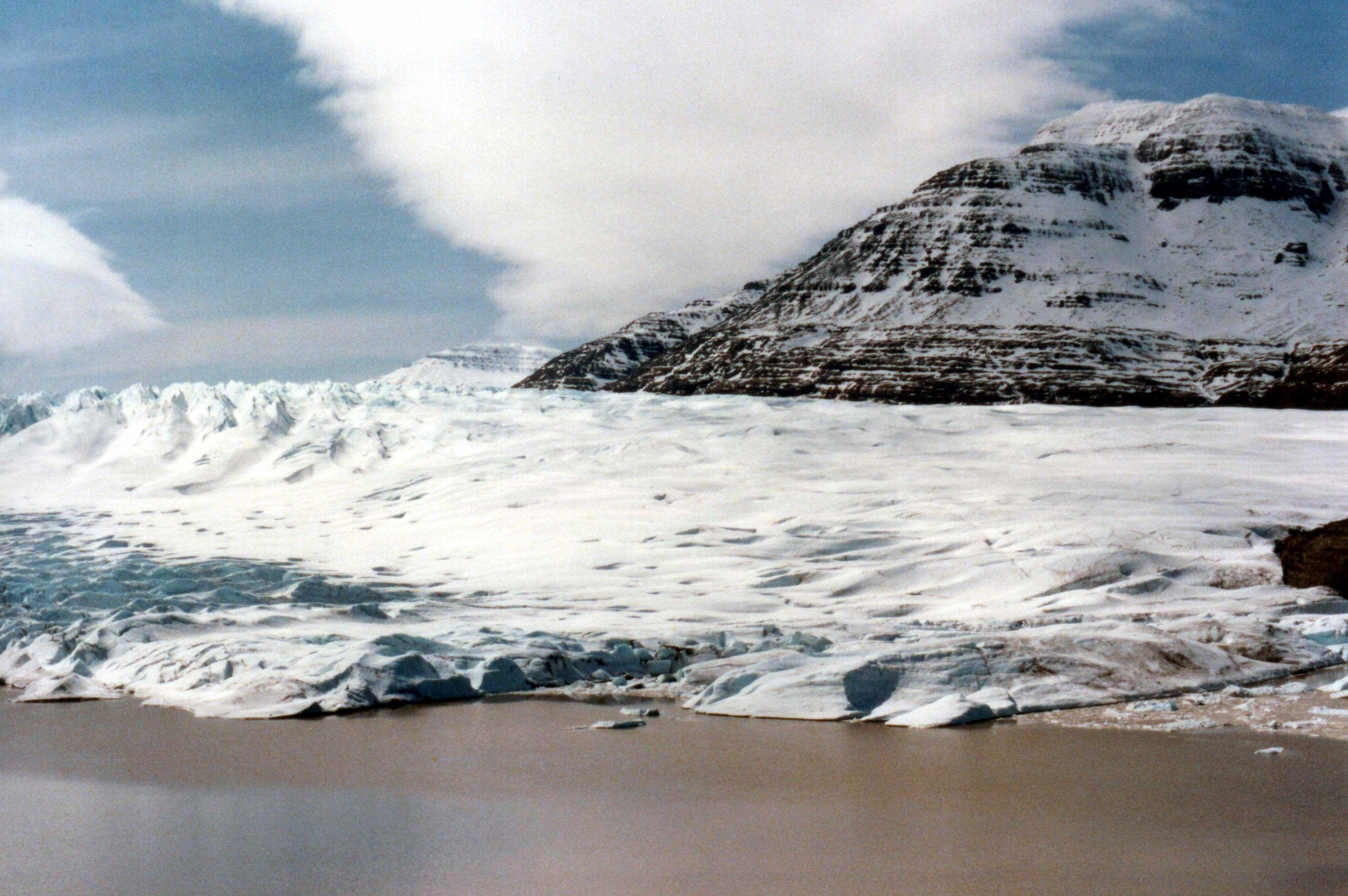
Cook Glacier

- Christensen Glacier – Bouvet Island, Atlantic Ocean
- Cook Glacier – Kerguelen Islands, Indian Ocean
- Fortuna Glacier – South Georgia Island, Atlantic Ocean
- Jacka Glacier – Anzac Peak, Heard Island, Indian Ocean
- Mawson Peak – Heard Island, Indian Ocean
- Posadowsky Glacier – Bouvet Island, Atlantic Ocean

== List of longest glaciers on Earth in non-polar regions ==
The following is the list of longest glaciers in the non-polar regions, generally regarded as between 60 degrees north and 60 degrees south latitude, though some definitions expand it slightly.

1. Vanch-Yakh Glacier, Tajikistan – 77 km (48 mi)
2. Siachen Glacier, Ladakh, India – 70 km (43 mi) when measuring from Indira Col or 76 km (47 mi) using the longest route as is done when determining river lengths
3. Biafo Glacier, Gilgit-Baltistan, Pakistan – 67 km (42 mi)
4. Brüg Glacier, Chile – 66 km (41 mi)
5. Baltoro Glacier, Gilgit-Baltistan, Pakistan – 63 km (39 mi)
6. South Inylchek Glacier, China and Kyrgyzstan – 60.5 km (37.6 mi)
7. Batura Glacier, Gilgit-Baltistan, Pakistan – 57 km (35 mi)

== See also ==
- Cryoseism
- Glacier growing
- Glaciers on Mars
- Ice dam
- Retreat of glaciers since 1850
- Ice field
- Snow field
- Rock glacier
- Sag (geology)
