= Onelli Bay =

Bay in southern Argentina

- Bahía Onelli (Spanish)
- Location within Santa Cruz Province
- Location: South America
- Coordinates: 50°05′32″S 73°16′30″W
- Basin countries: Argentina

Onelli Bay (Spanish: Bahía Onelli) is a bay of Argentino Lake, Santa Cruz Province, Argentina, within Los Glaciares National Park. It is made up of a Patagonian forest and a tributary of Lake Onelli flows into it, into which the Onelli, Agassiz, Bolados and Heim Glaciers also flow.

Onelli Bay can only be accessed by sailing from Puerto Bandera, in El Calafate, visiting the Southern Patagonian Ice Field, also passing through the Spegazzini Glacier and the Upsala Glacier.

The southern forest of the bay presents examples of ñires, canelos and lengas, trees typical of Patagonia. Formerly, the place was known as Puerto de las Vacas, due to the population of wild cows that inhabit the bay. Condors can also be found flying over the mountains that border Lake Argentino.
