= Kumbhakarna Mountain =

Mountain in Nepal

Kumbhakarna ᤑᤥᤰᤋᤠᤱᤗᤢᤱᤔᤠ
- Jannu
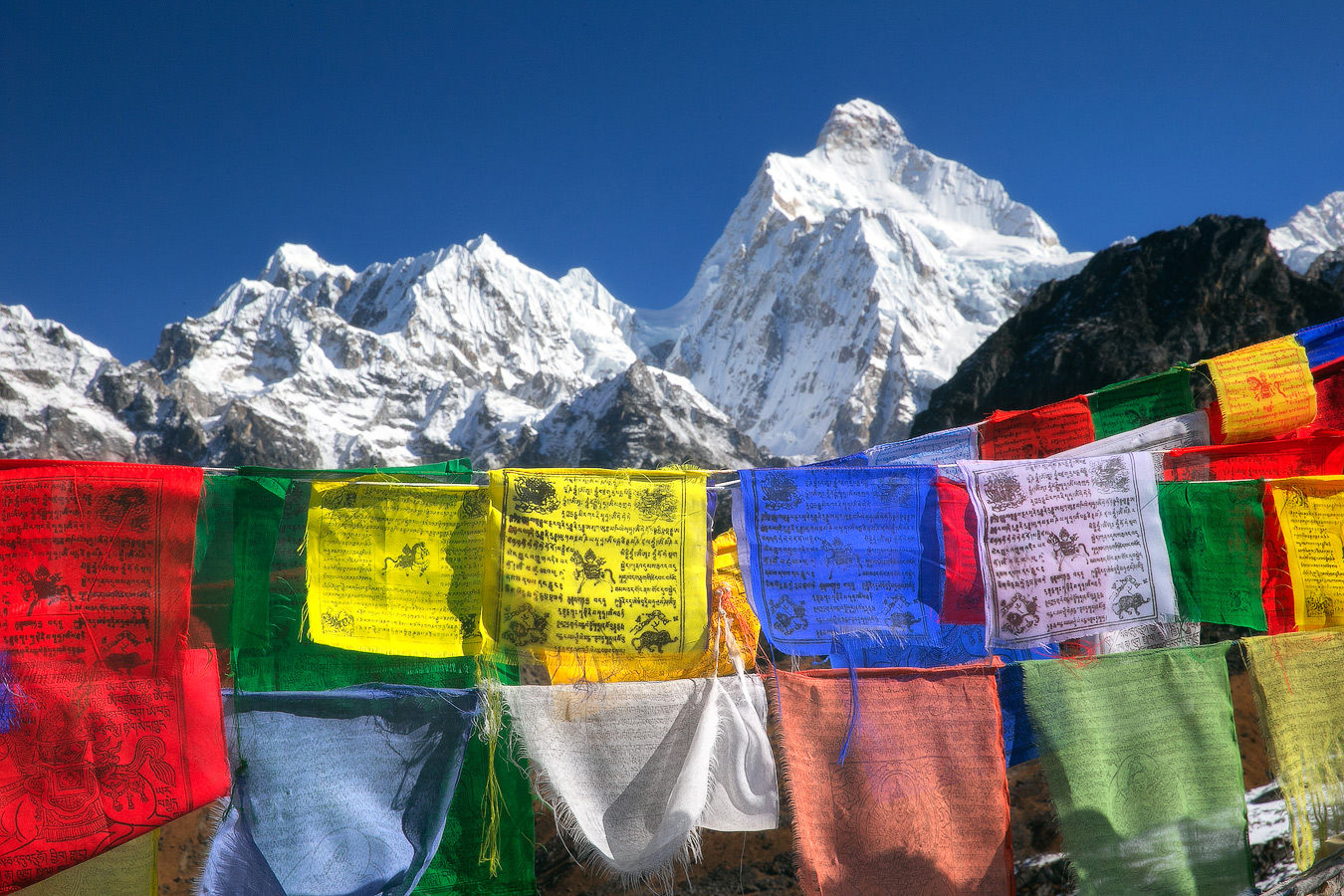
- Jannu from the south

Highest point
- Elevation: 7,710 m (25,300 ft); Ranked 32nd
- Prominence: 1,035 m (3,396 ft)
- Listing: List of mountains in Nepal
- Coordinates: 27°40′57″N 88°02′15″E

Geography
- The major peaks (not mountains) above 7,500 m (24,600 ft) height in Himalayas, rank identified in Himalayas alone (not the world). Legend: 1：Mount Everest; 2：Kangchenjunga; 3：Lhotse; 4：Yalung Kang, Kanchenjunga West; 5：Makalu; 6：Kangchenjunga South; 7：Kangchenjunga Central; 8：Cho Oyu; 9：Dhaulagiri; 10：Manaslu (Kutang); 11：Nanga Parbat (Diamer); 12：Annapurna; 13：Shishapangma (Shishasbangma, Xixiabangma); 14：Manaslu East; 15：Annapurna East Peak; 16： Gyachung Kang; 17：Annapurna II; 18：Tenzing Peak (Ngojumba Kang, Ngozumpa Kang, Ngojumba Ri); 19：Kangbachen; 20：Himalchuli (Himal Chuli); 21：Ngadi Chuli (Peak 29, Dakura, Dakum, Dunapurna); 22：Nuptse (Nubtse); 23：Nanda Devi; 24：Chomo Lonzo (Chomolonzo, Chomolönzo, Chomo Lönzo, Jomolönzo, Lhamalangcho); 25：Namcha Barwa (Namchabarwa); 26：Zemu Kang (Zemu Gap Peak); 27：Kamet; 28：Dhaulagiri II; 29：Ngojumba Kang II; 30：Dhaulagiri III; 31：Kumbhakarna Mountain (Mount Kumbhakarna, Jannu); 32：Gurla Mandhata (Naimona'nyi, Namu Nan); 33：Hillary Peak (Ngojumba Kang III); 34：Molamenqing (Phola Gangchen); 35：Dhaulagiri IV; 36：Annapurna Fang; 37：Silver Crag; 38：Kangbachen Southwest; 39：Gangkhar Puensum (Gangkar Punsum); 40：Annapurna III; 41：Himalchuli West; 42：Annapurna IV; 43：Kula Kangri; 44：Liankang Kangri (Gangkhar Puensum North, Liangkang Kangri); 45：Ngadi Chuli South; Location in Nepal
- Location: Eastern Nepal
- Parent range: Himalayas

Climbing
- First ascent: April 27–28, 1962 by René Desmaison, Paul Keller, Robert Paragot, Gyalzen Mitchung Sherpa, Lionel Terray, André Bertraud, Jean Bouvier, Pierre Leroux, Yves Pollet-Villard, Jean Ravier and Wangdi Sherpa
- Easiest route: rock/snow/ice climb

Phaaktanglungma or Mount Kumbhakarna or Jannu or (Limbu: ᤑᤥᤰᤋᤠᤱᤗᤢᤱᤔᤠ, Phaaktanglungma; in Limbu) is the 32nd-highest mountain in the world. It is an important western outlier of Kangchenjunga, the world's third-highest peak. Kumbhakarna is a large and steep peak in its own right, and has numerous challenging climbing routes. A subsidiary peak, found on the east face of the mountain, Jannu East was known until 2025 as one of the last unclimbed peaks in the Himalayas.

The official name of this peak is Kumbhakarna, but the designation Jannu is still better known. It is called Phoktanglungma by the native population, literally "mountain with shoulders" (phoktang means "shoulder" and lungma means "mountain"), in the Limbu language, and is sacred in the yuma religion.

== Location ==
Kumbhakarna is the highest peak of the Kumbhakarna Section of the Kangchenjunga Himal (using H. Adams Carter's classification), which straddles the border between Nepal and Sikkim, and lies entirely within Nepal. A long ridge connects it with Kangchenjunga to the east.

== Notable features ==
Kumbhakarna is the 32nd highest peak in the world (using a cutoff of 500m prominence, or re-ascent). It is more notable for its climbing challenge, and is one of the hardest peaks in the world in terms of technical difficulty because of its complex structure, its vertical relief, and the particularly steep climbing near the summit. The north face, in particular, has been the scene of some of the most technical (and controversial) climbing achieved at altitudes over 7000m.

== Climbing history ==
Kumbhakarna Jannu was first reconnoitered in 1957 by Guido Magnone, and first attempted in 1959 by a French team led by Jean Franco. It was first climbed in 1962 by a team led by the French alpinist Lionel Terray. Those reaching the summit were René Desmaison, Paul Keller, Robert Paragot and Gyalzen Mitchung Sherpa (April 27) and Lionel Terray, André Bertraud, Jean Bouvier, Pierre Leroux, Yves Pollet-Villard, Jean Ravier and Wangdi Sherpa (April 28).

Their route started from the Yamatari Glacier south of the peak and followed a circuitous route to the large plateau known as the Throne (a hanging glacier south of the summit), continuing to the summit via the southeast ridge.

The huge, steep north face (the so-called "Wall of Shadows") was first climbed in 1976 by a Japanese team led by Masatsugu Konishi (ja:小西政継, by a route that starts on the left side of the face and then meets the east ridge, avoiding the steep headwall at the top of the face (though a New Zealand team had climbed the north face the previous year without proceeding to the summit). A Dutch team ascended the north face in 1987, three men reached the summit but only one made it down. A Slovenian climber, Tomo Česen, claimed a solo ascent of a more direct route on the face in 1989, but this claim is considered suspect by many in the climbing community.

In 2004, after a failed attempt the previous year, a Russian team led by Alexander Odintsov succeeded in climbing the direct north face route through the headwall. This required big-wall aid techniques in a sustained, committing setting at over 7500m, a major achievement. However some in the climbing community were upset to learn that the Russians left a good deal of equipment on the wall, provoking a debate over what constitutes appropriate modern style on such a route. Despite the controversy, the team won the Piolet d'Or for the ascent.

On October 12th 2023, three American climbers, Alan Rousseau, Matt Cornell and Jackson Marvell reached the summit. They climbed with no supplemental oxygen, no ropes fixed in advance, and no porters beyond base camp, using only what they could carry on their backs.

The Himalayan Index lists over a dozen ascents of Jannu; there may be others that have not been written up in the climbing literature.

Jannu East
- Jannu Est
- Location within Nepal

Highest point
- Elevation: 7,468 m (24,501 ft)
- Prominence: 50 m (160 ft)
- Parent peak: Jannu

Geography
- Location: Nepal
- Parent range: Himalaya

Climbing
- First ascent: October 15th 2025 by Benjamin Vedrines and Nicolas Jean.

=== Jannu East ===
The east face of Jannu rises to 7,468 m (24,501 ft). The north face of this subsidiary peak had been described as "arguably amongst the hardest unclimbed, unattempted walls worldwide". In 1991, the mountain was first attempted by a Slovenian team, but the climbers declined their summit bid at 7,050 m (23,130 ft). Several other attempts over the years by Slovenian teams have been unsuccessful.

In 2022, a Spanish team attempted the East face alpine style. They were ultimately unsuccessful.

In 2023, Michael Gardner and Sam Hennessey reached 7,010 m (23,000 ft) via the North face before descending due to high winds. The next year, Gardner and Hennessey returned to the mountain. On October 7, 2024, American climber Michael Gardner died when he fell from Jannu East when attempting a new route up the mountain's north face. French climbers Léo Billon, Nicolas Jean and Benjamin Védrines who were also attempting the peak, came to Gardner's climbing partner Sam Hennessey's aid and aborted their attempt on the peak.

French climbers Benjamin Védrines and Nicolas Jean completed the first ascent of Jannu East on October 15, 2025 via a 2,300 m (7,500 ft) alpine style route.

== Gallery ==
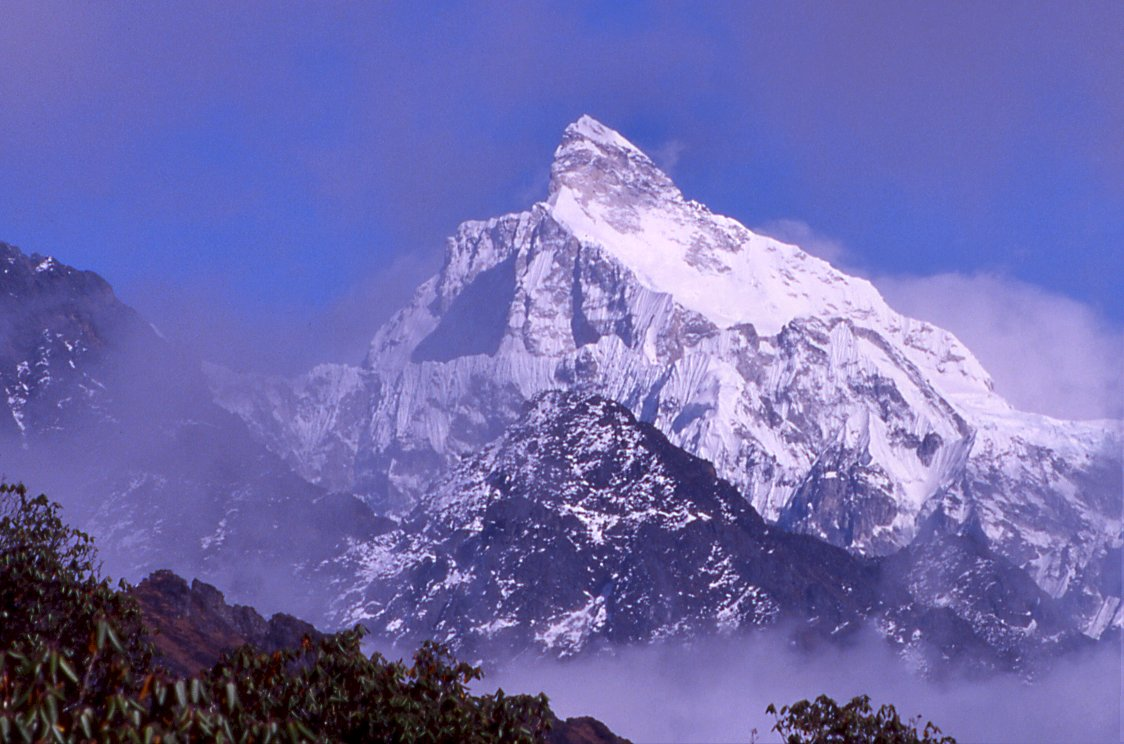
Kumbhakarna from the west, a pass between Olung and Gyabla

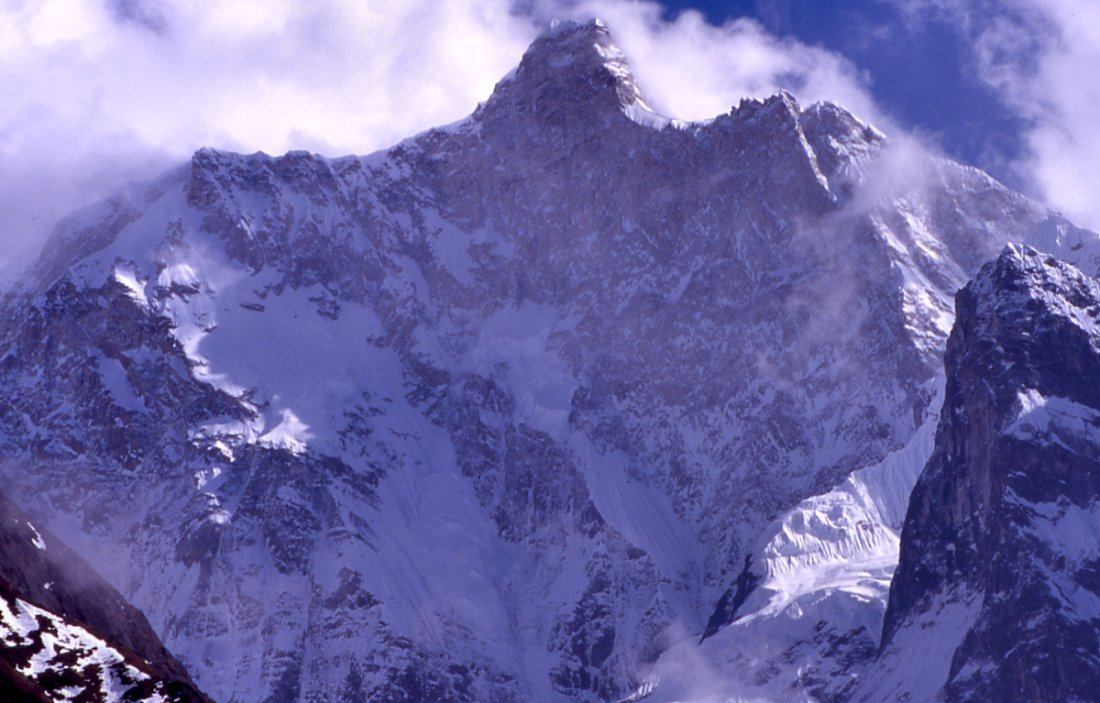
The north-face

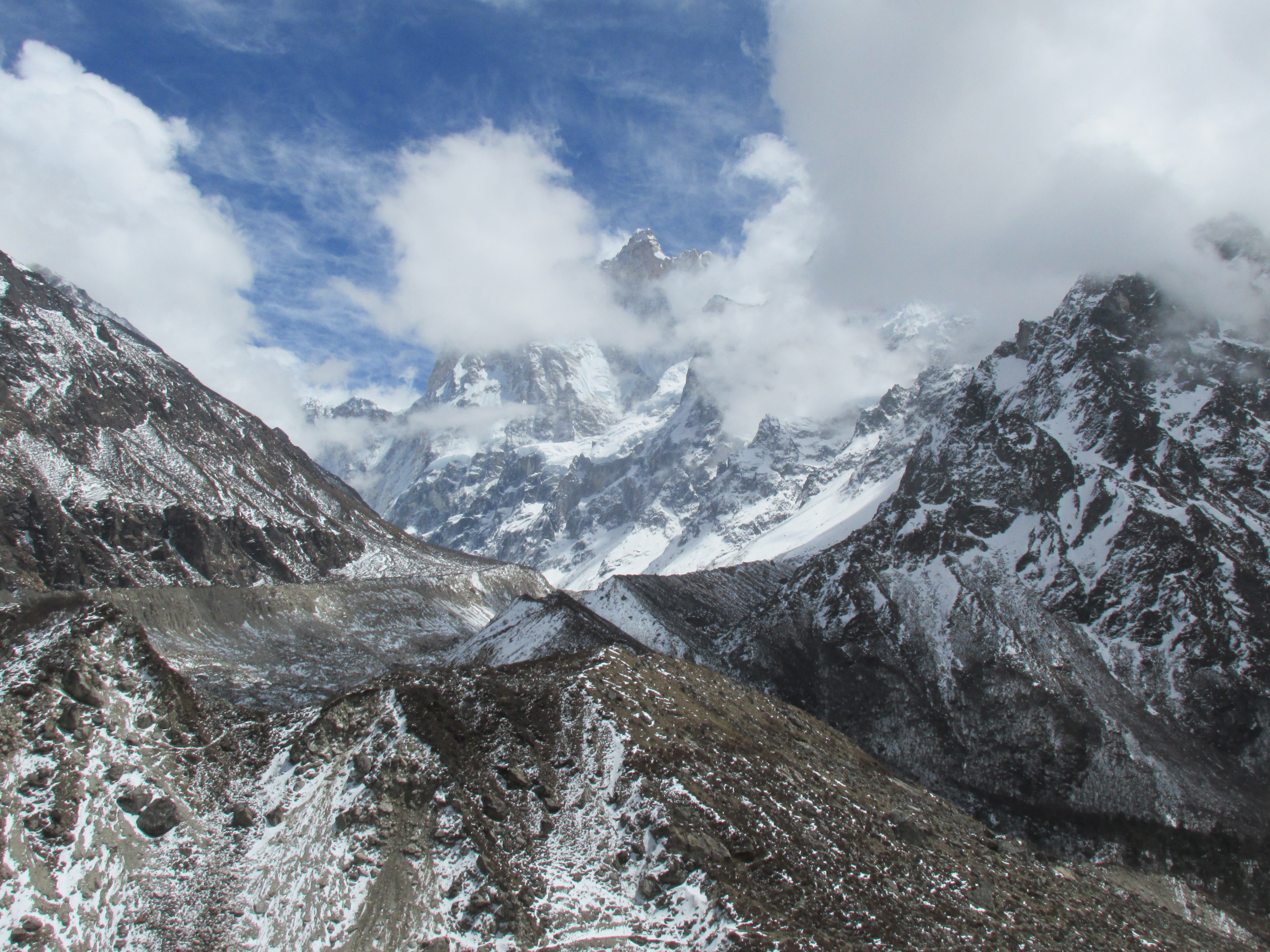
The west-face from Kambachen

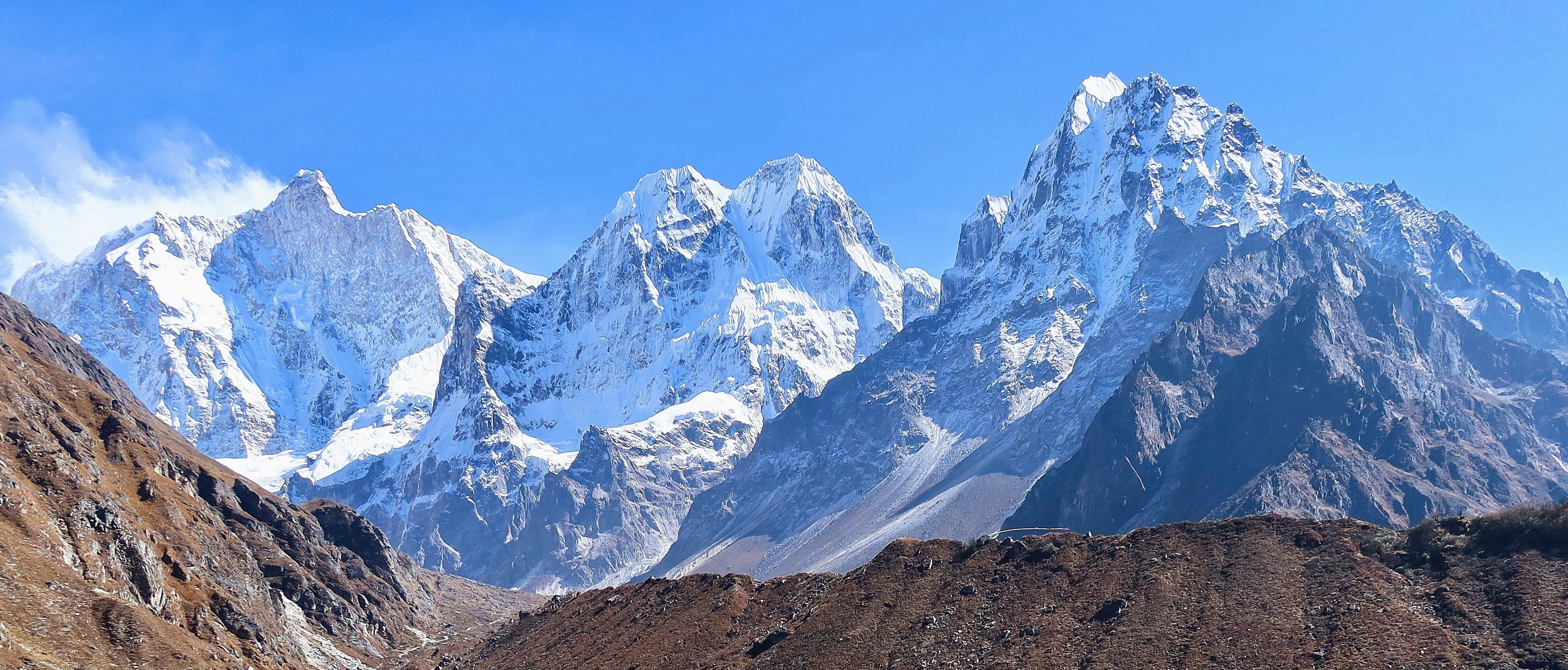
Kumbhakarna (left) with Pholesobi (center)
