= Electric Peak =

Electric Peak may refer to:

- Electric Peak (Montana)
- Electric Peak (San Juan Mountains), Colorado
- Electric Peak (Sangre de Cristo), Colorado

== See also ==
- Cerro Eléctrico, Argentina
