= Cerro Eléctrico =

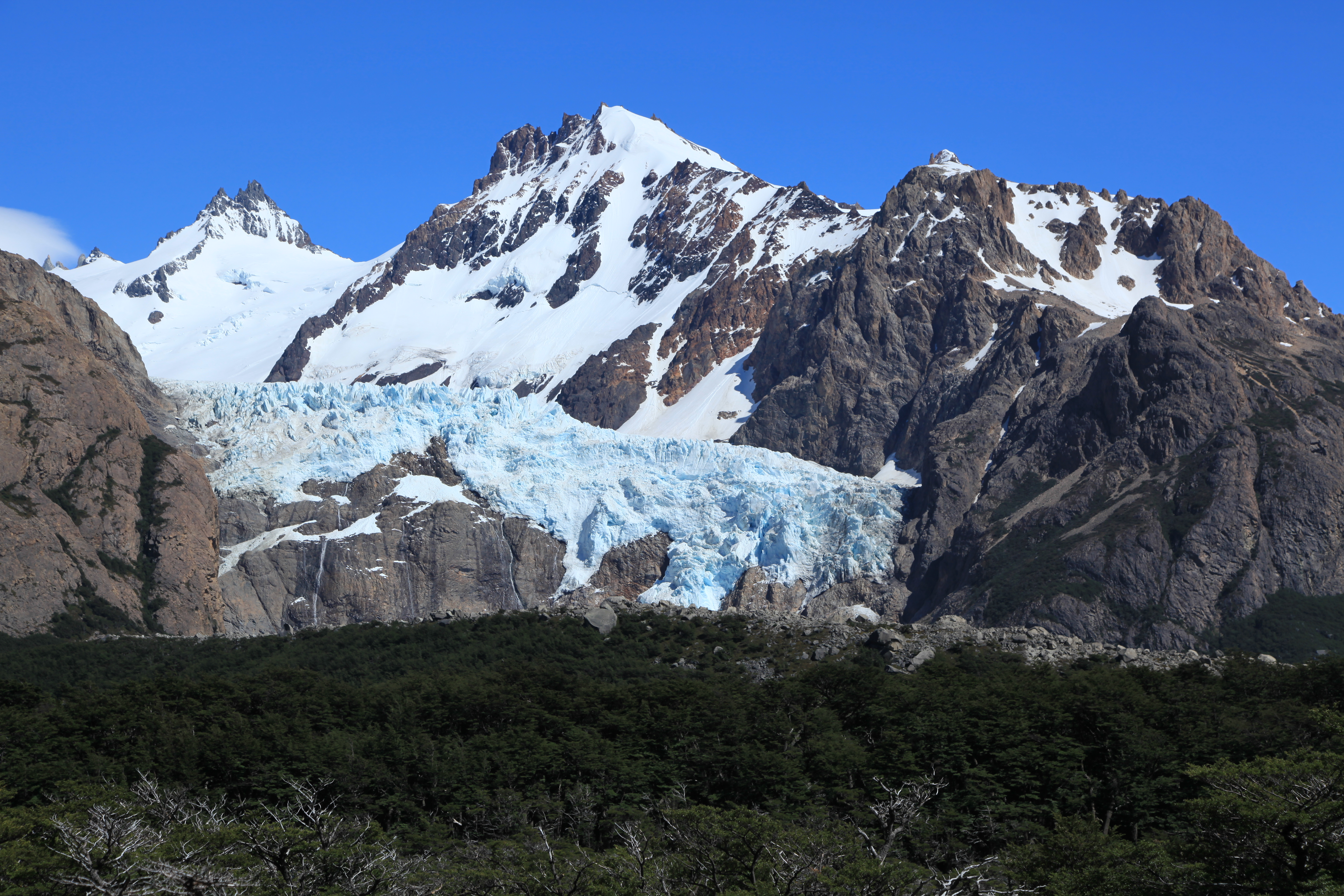
- East-southeast aspect

Highest point
- Elevation: 2,257 m (7,405 ft)
- Prominence: 259 m (850 ft)
- Parent peak: Fitz Roy
- Isolation: 1.52 km (0.94 mi)
- Coordinates: 49°15′04″S 73°00′34″W

Naming
- Etymology: Electric Hill

Geography
- Location within Argentina Location within South America Location within Southern Patagonia
- Interactive map of Cerro Eléctrico
- Country: Argentina
- Province: Santa Cruz
- Protected area: Los Glaciares National Park
- Parent range: Andes
- Topo map: IGN 4769‑III El Chaltén

Climbing
- First ascent: 1932

Cerro Eléctrico is a mountain in Santa Cruz Province, Argentina.

== Description ==
Cerro Eléctrico is a 2,257-meter-elevation (7,405-foot) summit in the Andes. The peak is located three kilometers (1.86 miles) northeast of Fitz Roy and 12 kilometers (7.5 miles) northwest of El Chaltén, in Los Glaciares National Park of Patagonia. Topographic relief is significant as the summit rises 1,600 meters (5,250 ft) above Laguna Piedras Blancas in 1.5 kilometers (0.93 mile), and 1,725 meters (5,659 ft) above Rio Eléctrico in 2.5 kilometers (1.55 miles). Precipitation runoff from the mountain's slopes drains to Viedma Lake. The first ascent of the summit was made in 1932 by Alberto Maria de Agostini and Mario Derriard. The toponym translates as Electric Hill and was applied by pioneer settlers due to lightning from electrical storms, and was first recorded by Alberto Maria de Agostini. The nearest higher peak is Aguja Guillaumet, 2.09 kilometers (1.3 miles) to the west-southwest.

== Climate ==
According to the Köppen climate classification system, Cerro Eléctrico is located in a tundra climate zone with cold, snowy winters, and cool summers. Weather systems are forced upward by the mountains (orographic lift), causing moisture to drop in the form of rain and snow. This climate supports the Piedras Blancas Glacier on the south slope of the peak, and a small unnamed glacier on the east slope of the northeast peak. The months of November through February offer the most favorable weather for visiting or climbing this peak.

== Gallery ==
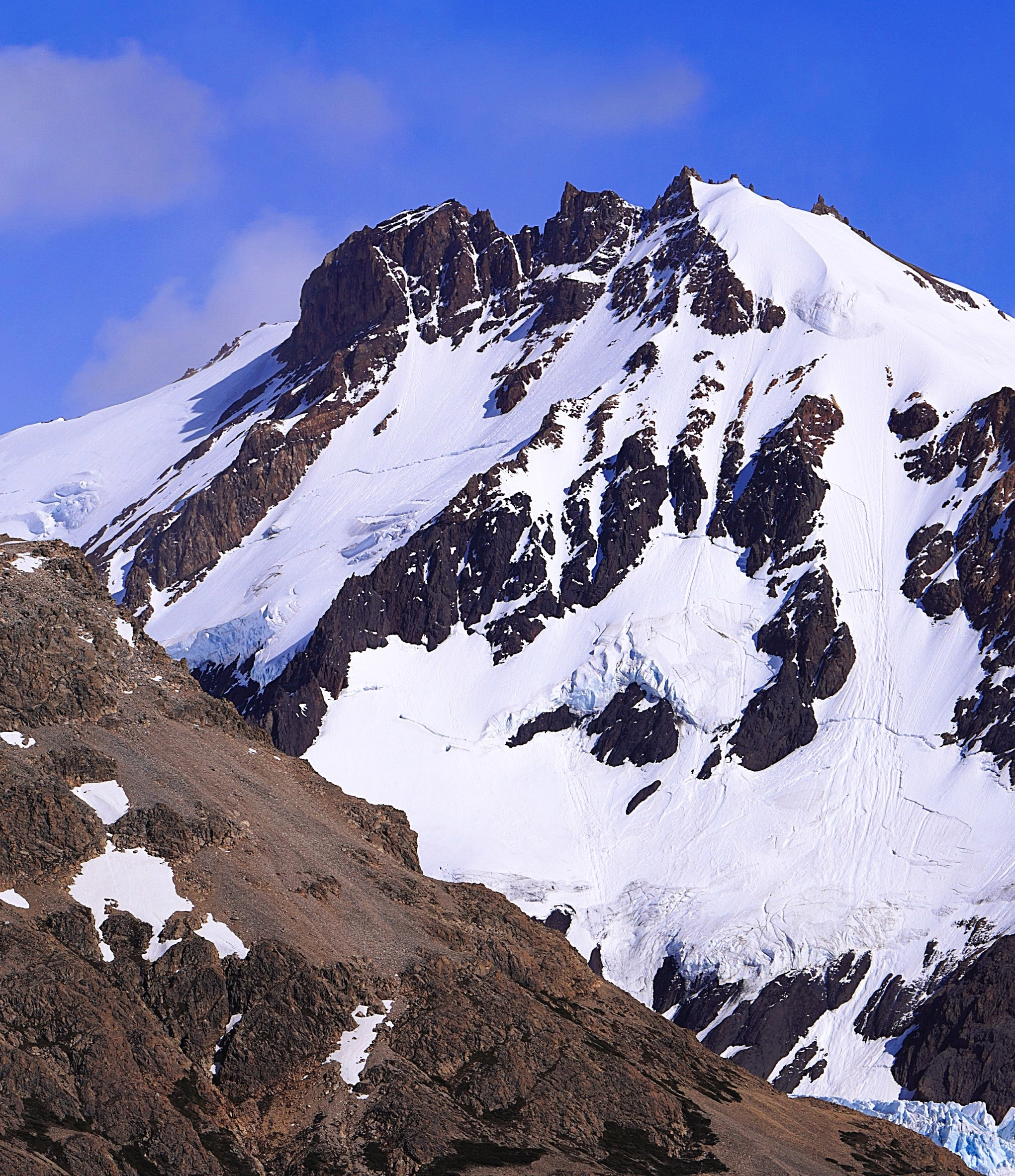
Southeast aspect

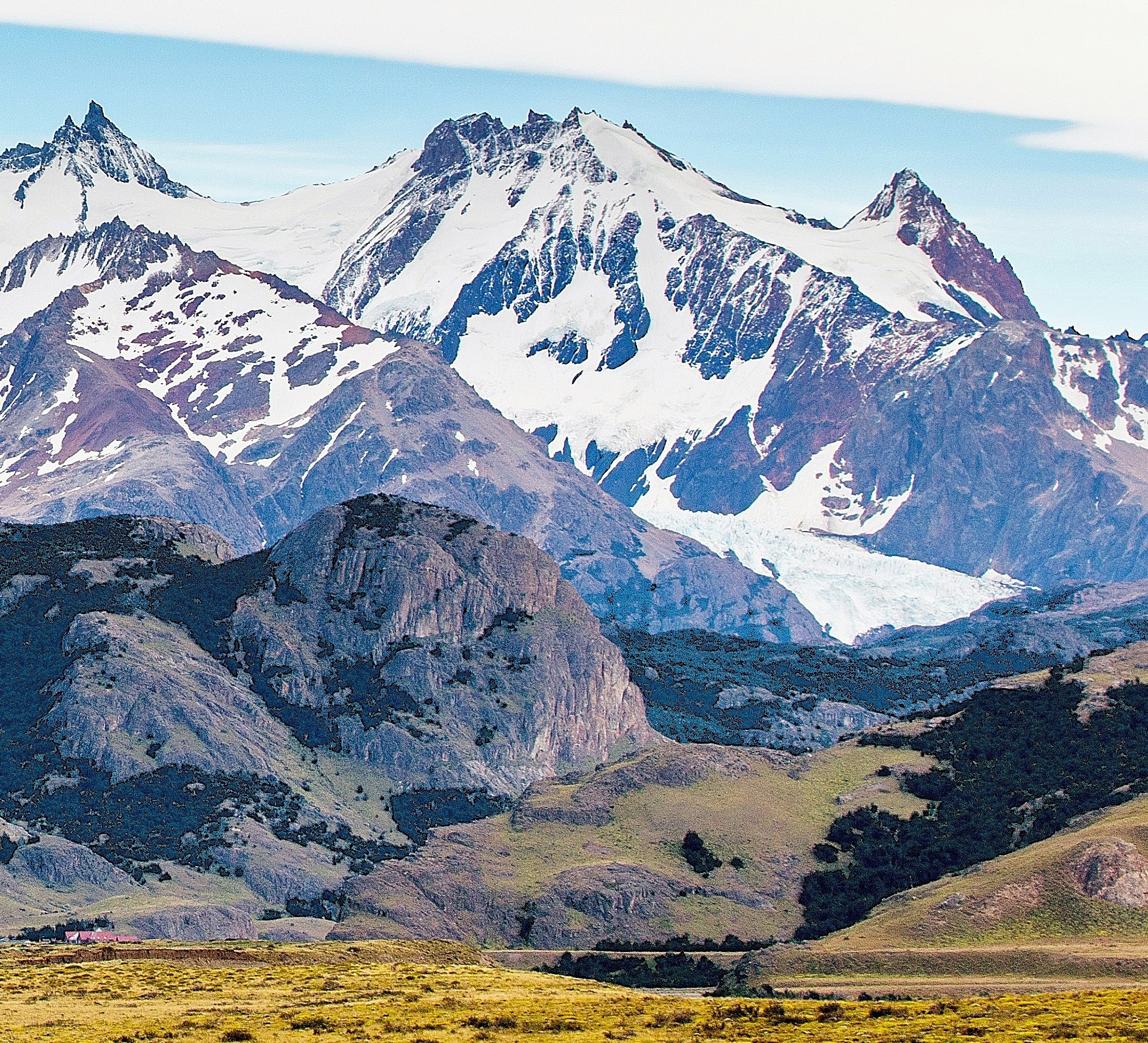
Southeast aspect

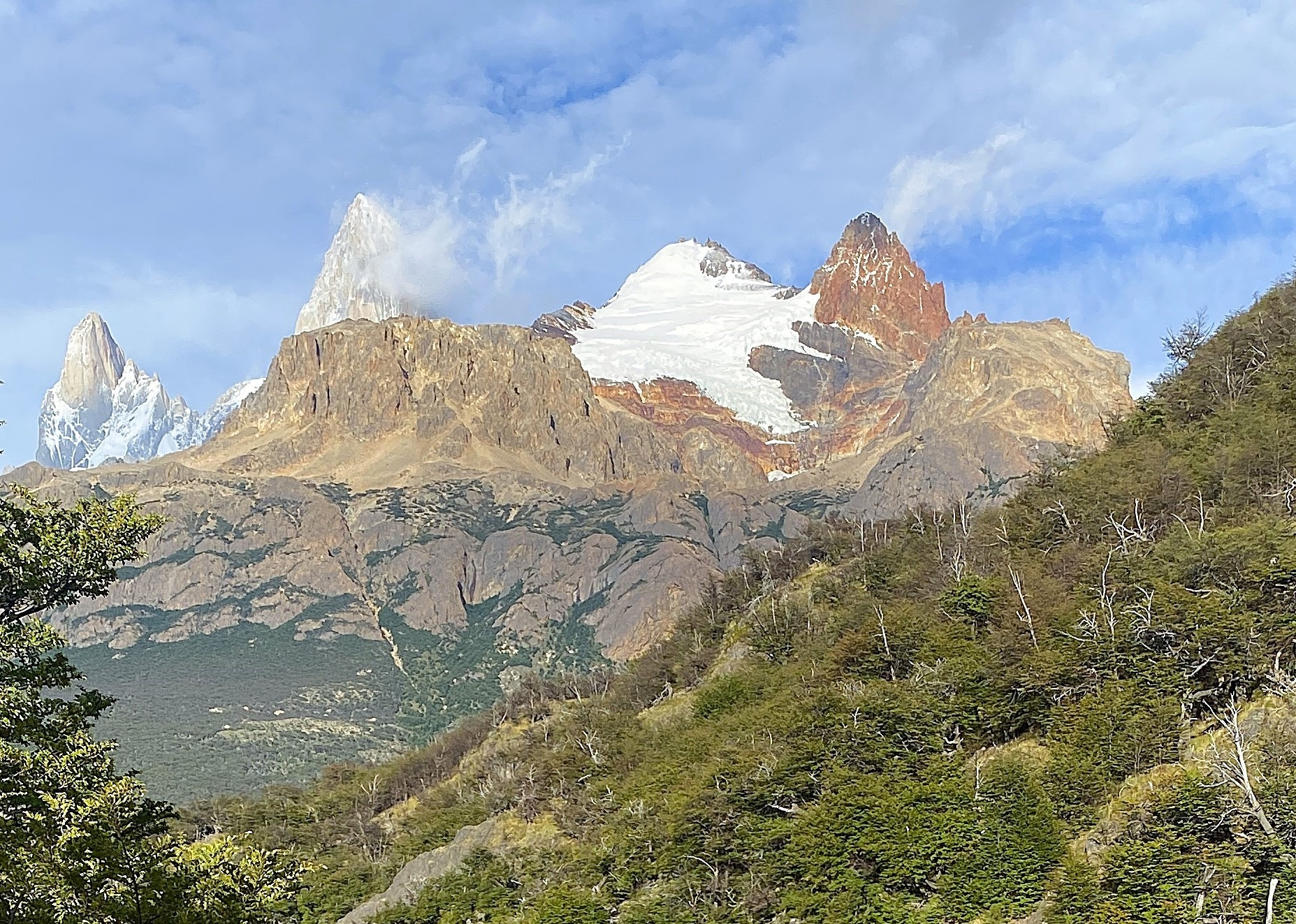
Cerro Eléctrico's northeast peak with glacier

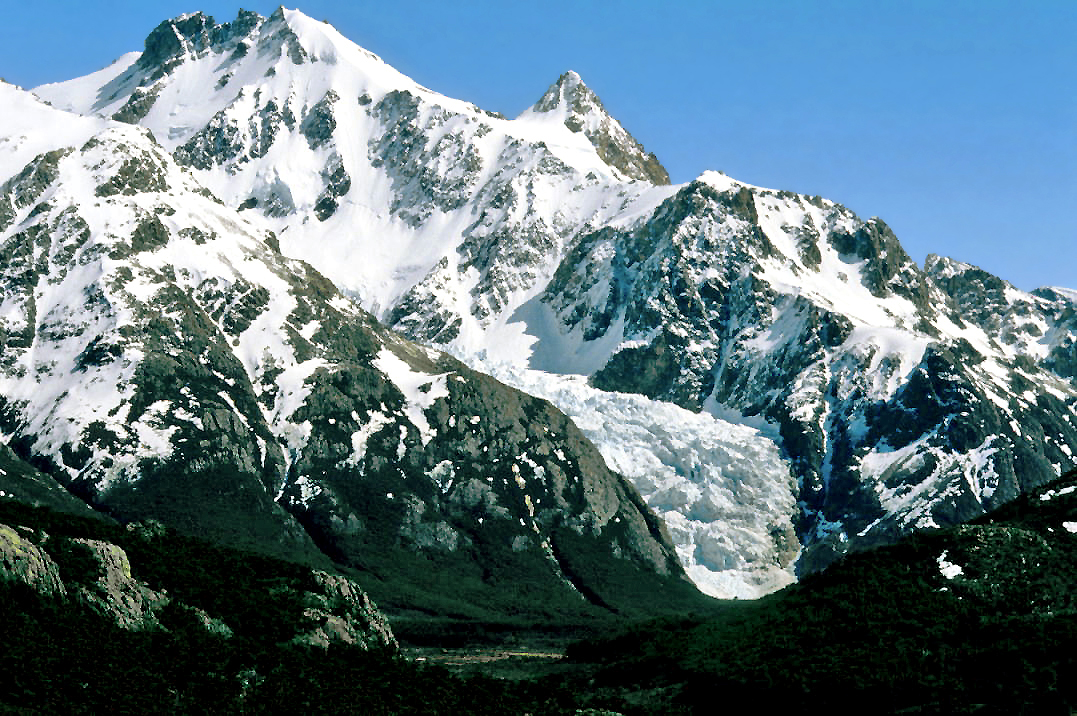
Southeast aspect

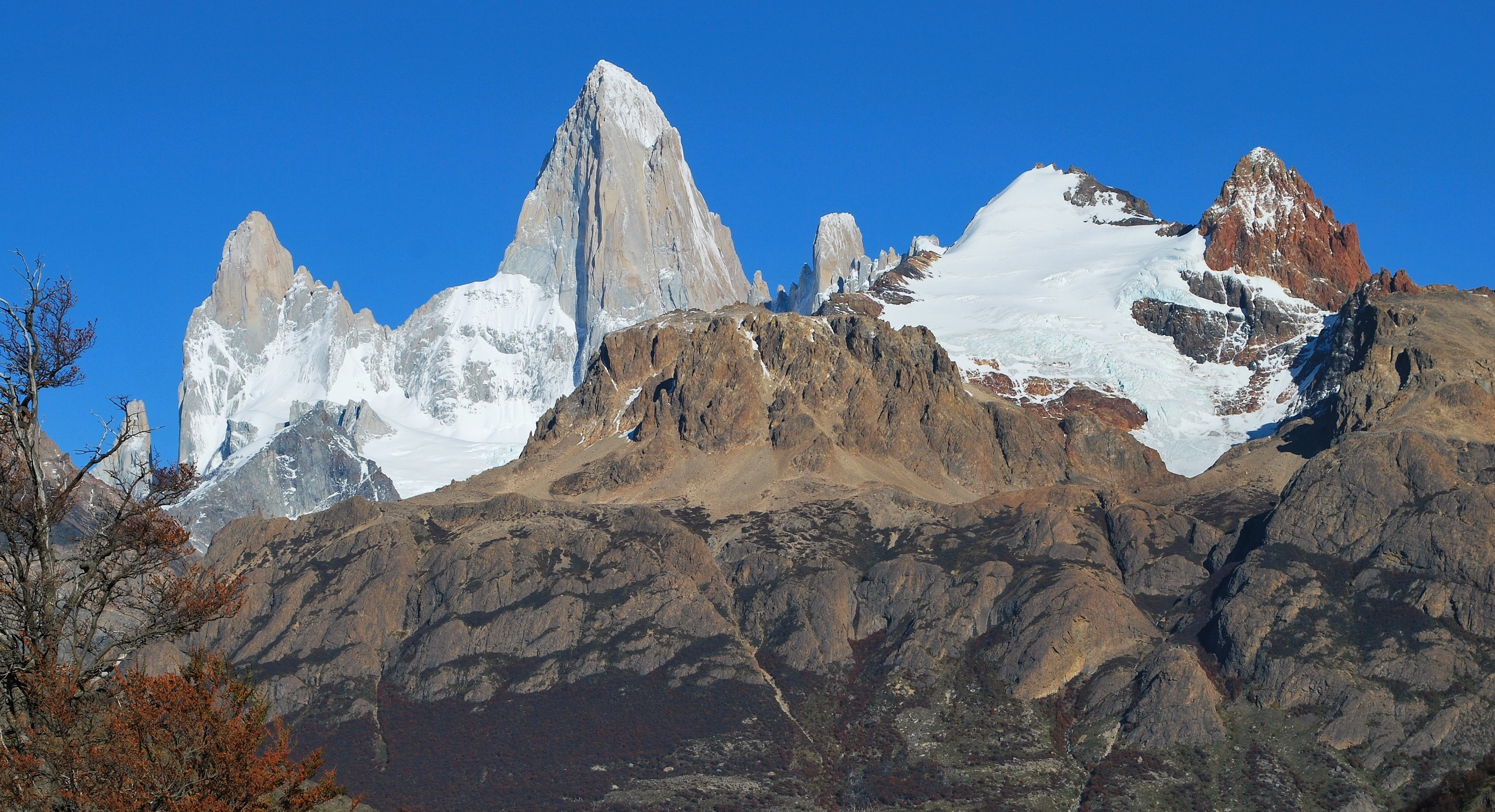
L→R:Aguja Poincenot, Fitz Roy, Cerro Eléctrico NE

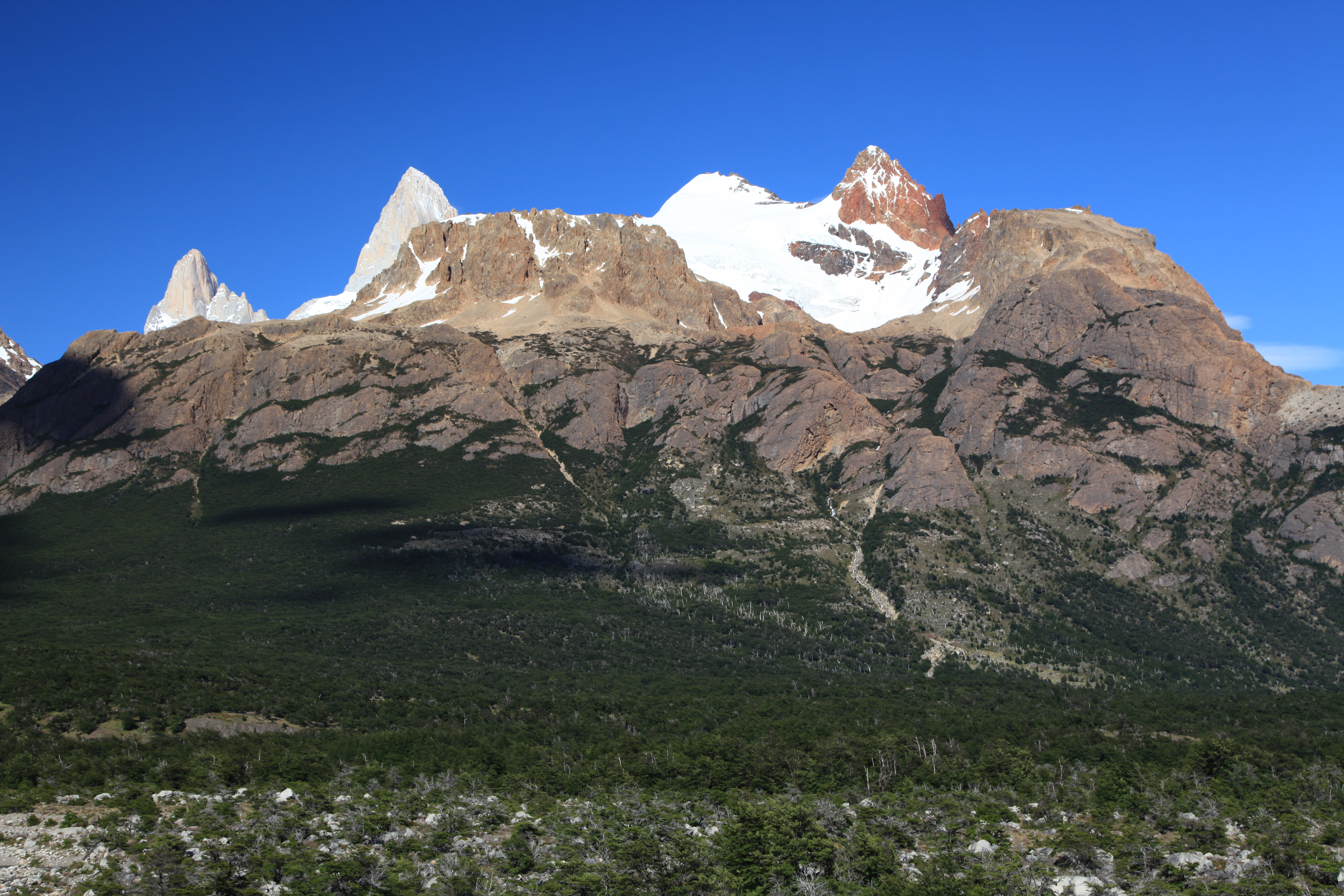
L→R:Aguja Poincenot, Fitz Roy, Cerro Eléctrico NE

== See also ==
- List of mountains in Argentina
