= Los Glaciares National Park =

National park in the Santa Cruz Province of Argentina

- IUCN category II (national park)
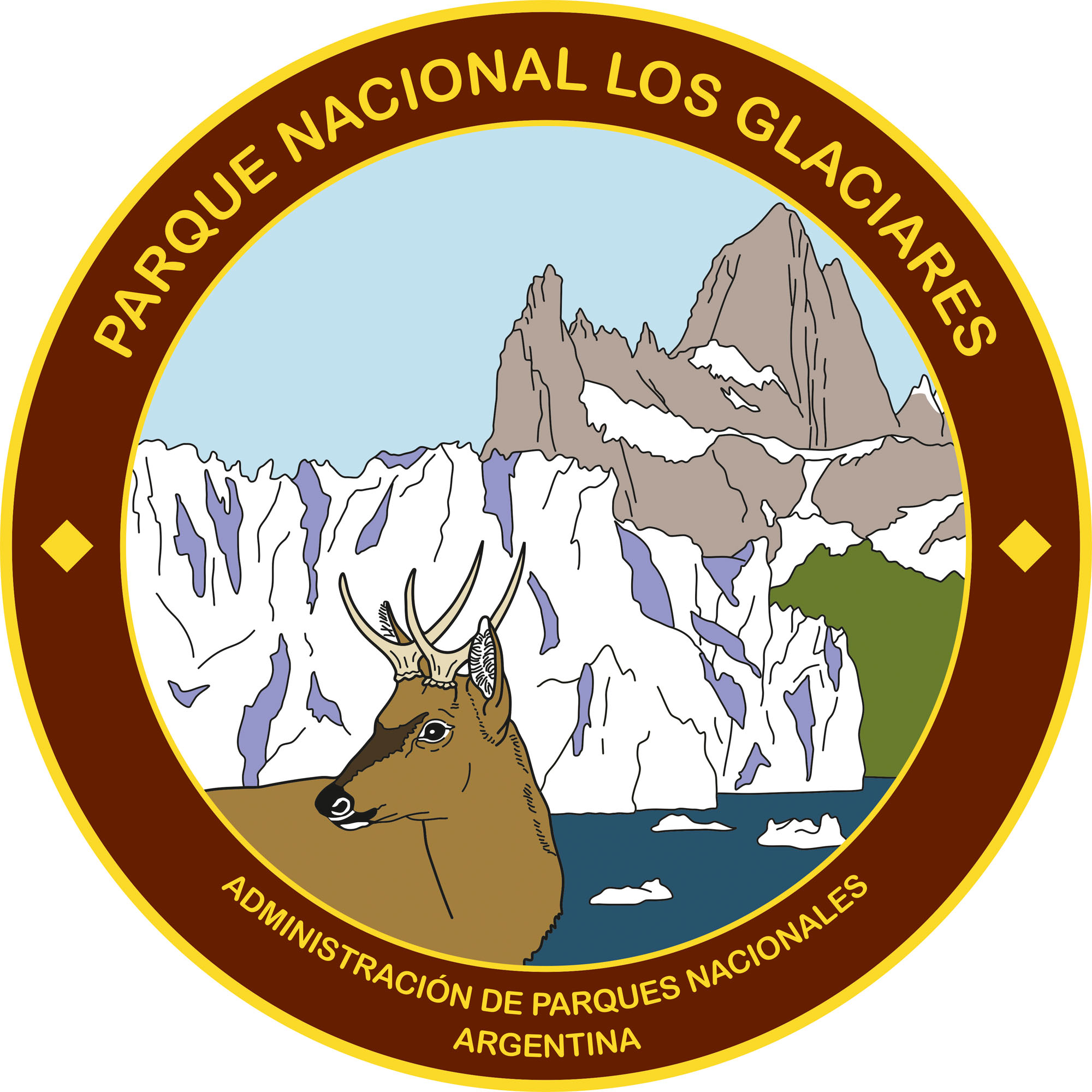
- Emblem of the Los Glaciares National Park

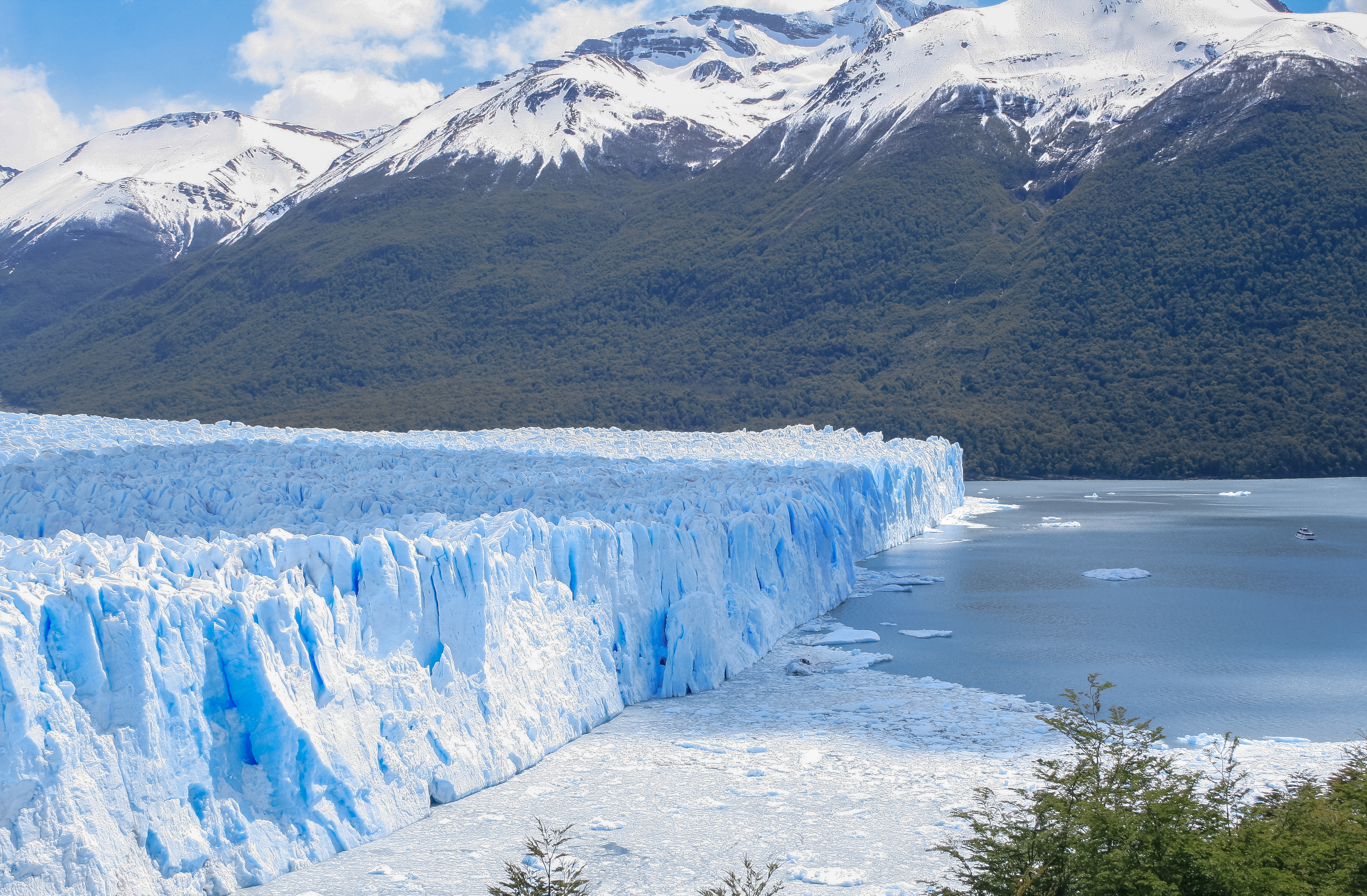
- Perito Moreno Glacier

- Location within Argentina
- Location: Santa Cruz Province, Argentina
- Nearest city: El Calafate
- Coordinates: 50°0′0″S 73°14′58″W
- Area: 726,927 ha (2,806.68 sq mi)
- Established: May 11, 1937
- Visitors: 688,837 (in 2023)
- Governing body: National Parks Administration

UNESCO World Heritage Site
- Criteria: Natural: vii, viii
- Reference: 145
- Inscription: 1981 (5th Session)

Los Glaciares National Park (Spanish: Parque Nacional Los Glaciares) is a federal protected area in Santa Cruz Province, Argentina.

The park covers an area of 726,927 ha (7,269.27 km^{2}; 2,806.68 sq mi), making it the largest national park in the country. Established on 11 May 1937, it hosts a representative sample of Magellanic subpolar forest and west Patagonian steppe biodiversity in a good state of conservation. In 1981, it was declared a World Heritage Site by UNESCO.

The park's name refers to the giant ice cap in the Andes, the largest outside of Antarctica, Greenland and Iceland, feeding 47 large glaciers, of which 13 flow towards the Pacific Ocean. In other parts of the world, glaciers start at a height of at least 2,500 m (8,200 ft) above mean sea level, but due to the size of the ice cap, these glaciers begin at only 1,500 m (4,900 ft), sliding down to 200 m (660 ft). Los Glaciares borders Torres del Paine National Park to the south in Chilean territory.

== Geography ==
Location and extension of the park.

Looking out from the observation deck of the Perito Moreno Glacier in Los Glaciers National Park in Southern Argentine Patagonia

Los Glaciares, of which 30% is covered by ice, can be divided into two parts, each corresponding to one of the two elongated big lakes partially contained by the park. Lake Argentino, 1,466 km^{2} (566 sq mi) and the largest in Argentina, is in the south, while Lake Viedma, 1,100 km^{2} (420 sq mi), is in the north. Both lakes feed the Santa Cruz River that flows down to Puerto Santa Cruz on the Atlantic. Between the two halves is a non-touristic zone without lakes called Zona Centro.

The northern half consists of part of Viedma Lake, the Viedma Glacier and a few minor glaciers, and a number of mountains very popular among fans of climbing and trekking, including Mount Fitz Roy and Cerro Torre.

The southern part has, as well as a number of smaller ones, the major glaciers which flow into Lake Argentino: Perito Moreno Glacier, Upsala Glacier, and Spegazzini Glacier. Typical excursion boats travel between icebergs to visit Onelli Bay, and the otherwise inaccessible Spegazzini and Upsala. Perito Moreno is reachable by land.

== Climate ==
The park has a cool and moist temperate climate. Mean temperatures range from 0.6 °C (33.1 °F) in winter to 13.4 °C (56.1 °F) in summer although at higher altitudes, the mean annual temperature can be around −3 °C (26.6 °F). The park receives an average annual rainfall of 500 mm (20 in) in the west and 900 mm (35 in) in the east which is evenly distributed throughout the year. Snowfall is common during the colder months.

== Ecology ==
The mountains hold most of the humidity from the Pacific Ocean, letting through only the ice coldness (annual average of 7.5 °C (45.5 °F)) and creating the arid Patagonian steppe on the Argentine side of the range. This area is habitat for rheas, guanaco, cougar, and South American gray fox, the latter of which has suffered from the invasion of the cattle industry and are endangered. The guanaco, while not endangered, has had a dramatic decline in historic population due to large scale grazing of livestock throughout much of Patagonia. There are over 100 species of birds in the area (condors, eagles, and others). Between the ice and the Patagonian steppe there is a fertile area of Magellanic subpolar forests composed mainly of lengas and guindos, but also ñires. Within these more hospitable areas also live huemul deer and torrent duck.

== Issues ==
Los Glaciares National Park faces many issues around tourism, overgrazing, forest fires and more. There are areas of the park where overgrazing is quite a problem and contains many alien/invasive and feral species such as cattle, European hares and certain types of trout. Forest fires have had a strong impact on the site and degraded and destroyed parts of it as well.

== Human use ==
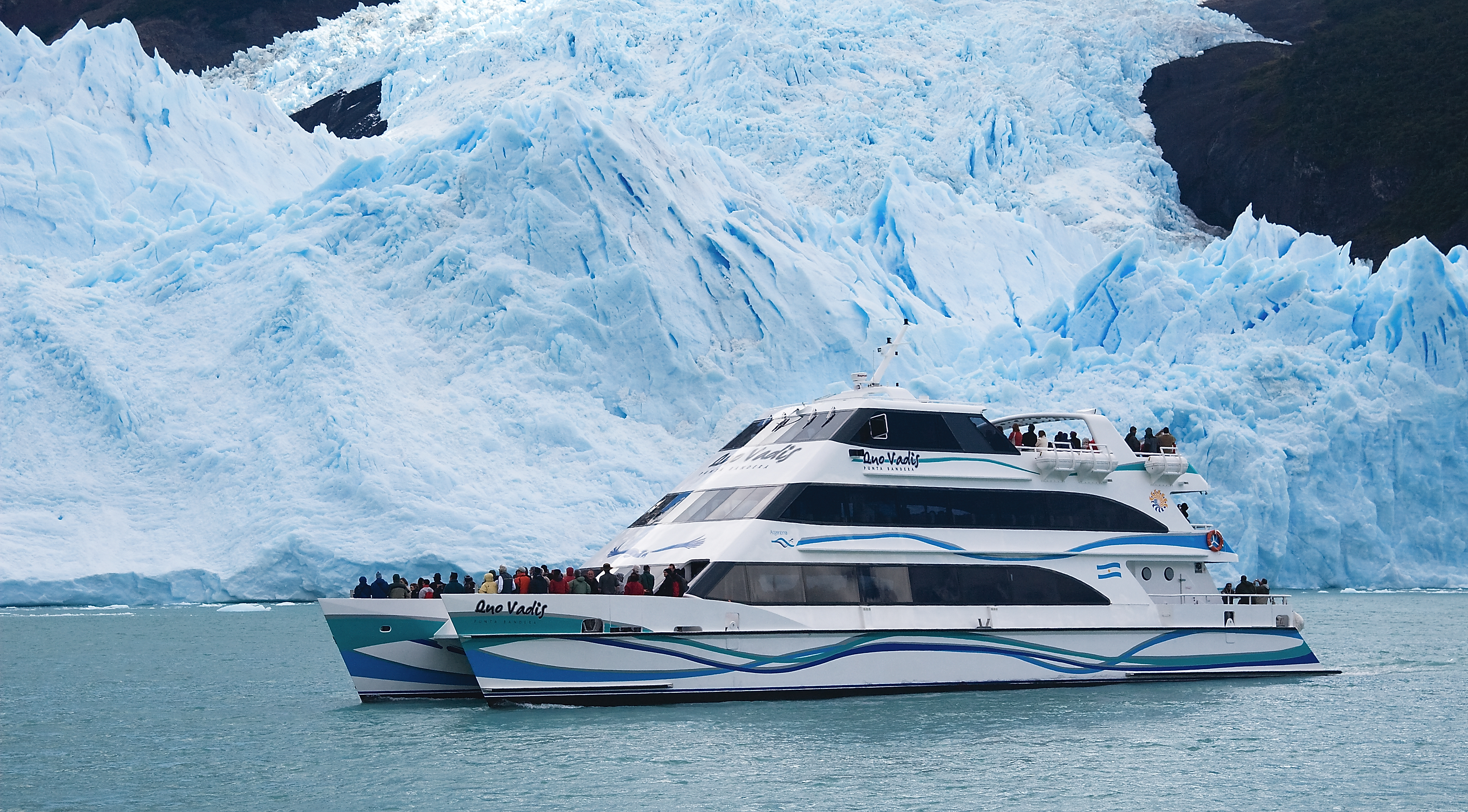
Tourist boat on Argentino Lake viewing the Upsala Glacier.

Los Glaciares is a major attraction for international tourists. Starting points of tours are the city of El Calafate at the shore of Lake Argentino but outside the park, where the park's administration has its headquarters, and El Chaltén village in the northern part of the park, at the foot of the Fitz Roy. Other touristic points in the park include Lago del Desierto and Lago Roca.

It was also used as one of the filming locations for "Return of the Ice", the second episode of the speculative science documentary series The Future is Wild.

== See also ==
- Laguna San Rafael National Park
- National Parks of Argentina
- Tourism in Argentina

== Bibliography ==
- Kearney, Alan (1993). Mountaineering in Patagonia. Seattle, WA: Cloudcap.
