= Nupchu Glacier =

Glacier in Nepal

Nupchu
- Location within Nepal Location within Tibet
- Interactive map of Nupchu
- Type: Valley glacier
- Location: Nepal
- Coordinates: 27°48′00″N 87°56′00″E

The Nupchu Glacier is located in the eastern Himalayas in Nepal. It is north of Kanchenjunga.
