= Nangpai Gosum Glacier =

Glacier in Nepal

Nangpai Gosum
- Location within Nepal Location within Tibet
- Interactive map of Nangpai Gosum
- Type: Valley glacier
- Location: Nepal
- Coordinates: 28°02′N 86°36′E

Nangpai Gosum Glacier is a glacier located 25 km west northwest of Mount Everest in the Himalayas of Nepal. It is located at lat 28°02′N., long 86°36′E. The ice-core drilling site is situated at 5,700 m above mean sea level. In 1998, a 37-m ice core was extracted from the glacier by Cameron P. Wake of the University of New Hampshire and transported to the university for analysis. At the request of the USGS study team, radionuclide analyses were performed for 36Cl and 137Cs on selected sections of the ice core by Hans-Arno Synal at the Paul Scherrer Institut (PSI) in Villigen, Switzerland.
