= Langtang Glacier =

Nepalese Himalayan glacier

Langtang
- Location within Nepal Location within Tibet
- Interactive map of Langtang
- Type: Valley glacier
- Location: Nepal
- Coordinates: 28°15′23″N 85°30′59″E
- Area: 46.5 km^{2} (18.0 sq mi)
- Length: 18 km (11 mi)

The Langtang Glacier is a short glacier in Nepal, located in Langtang in the Himalayas. In 2019 the glacier had a length of 18 kilometres (11 mi) and covered an area of 46.5 square kilometres (18 sq mi).
