= Yamatari Glacier =

Glacier in Nepal

Yamatari ᤕᤢᤢᤔᤠᤋᤠᤖᤥ Yumataaro
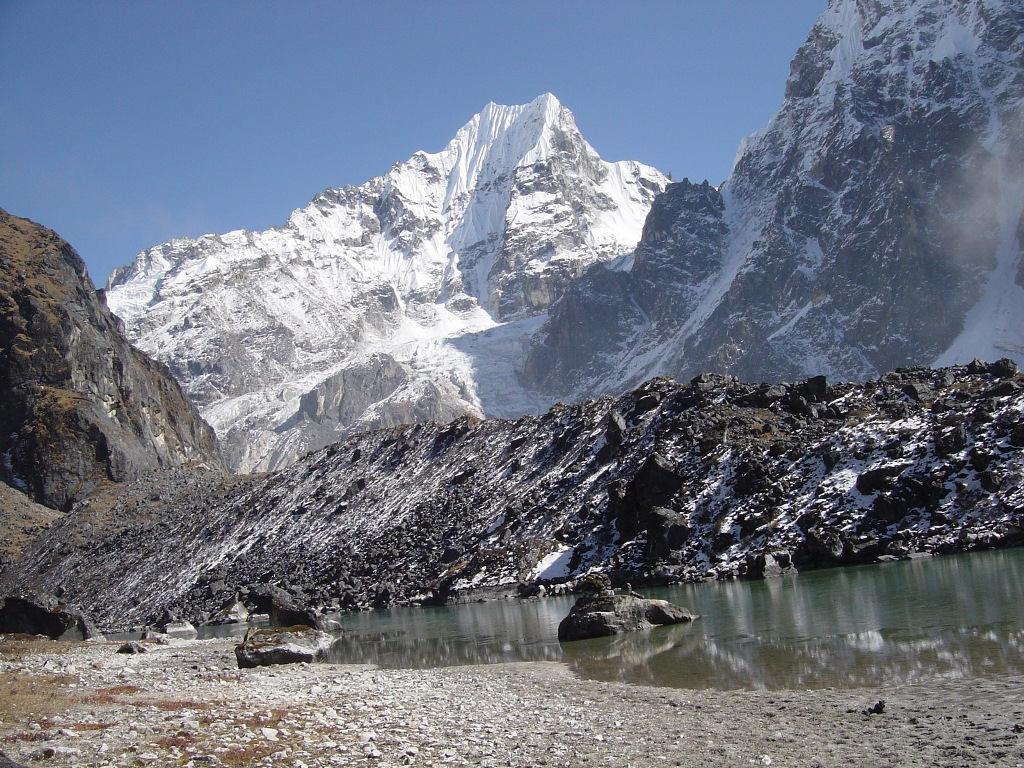
- Dudhkunda pond at Yamtari glacier

- Location within Nepal Location within Tibet
- Interactive map of Yamatari ᤕᤢᤢᤔᤠᤋᤠᤖᤥ Yumataaro
- Type: Valley glacier
- Location: Nepal
- Coordinates: 27°39′17″N 87°59′45″E

The Yamatari glacier (Limbu: ᤕᤢᤢᤔᤠᤋᤠᤖᤥ, Yumataaro; in Limbu) valley is located in Taplejung district. The glacier extends from 4050 m and 3900 m. It was formed during the neoglacial age. The glacier have a length of about 10 to 12 km. The Yamatari glacier terminates at and elevation of about 4200 m. Yamatari glacier joins Ghunsa valley at an elevation of about 3500 m just below the settlement at Ghunsa village.
