= Upsala Glacier =

Glacier in the Southern Patagonian Ice Field

Coordinates: 49°53′13″S 73°16′21″W

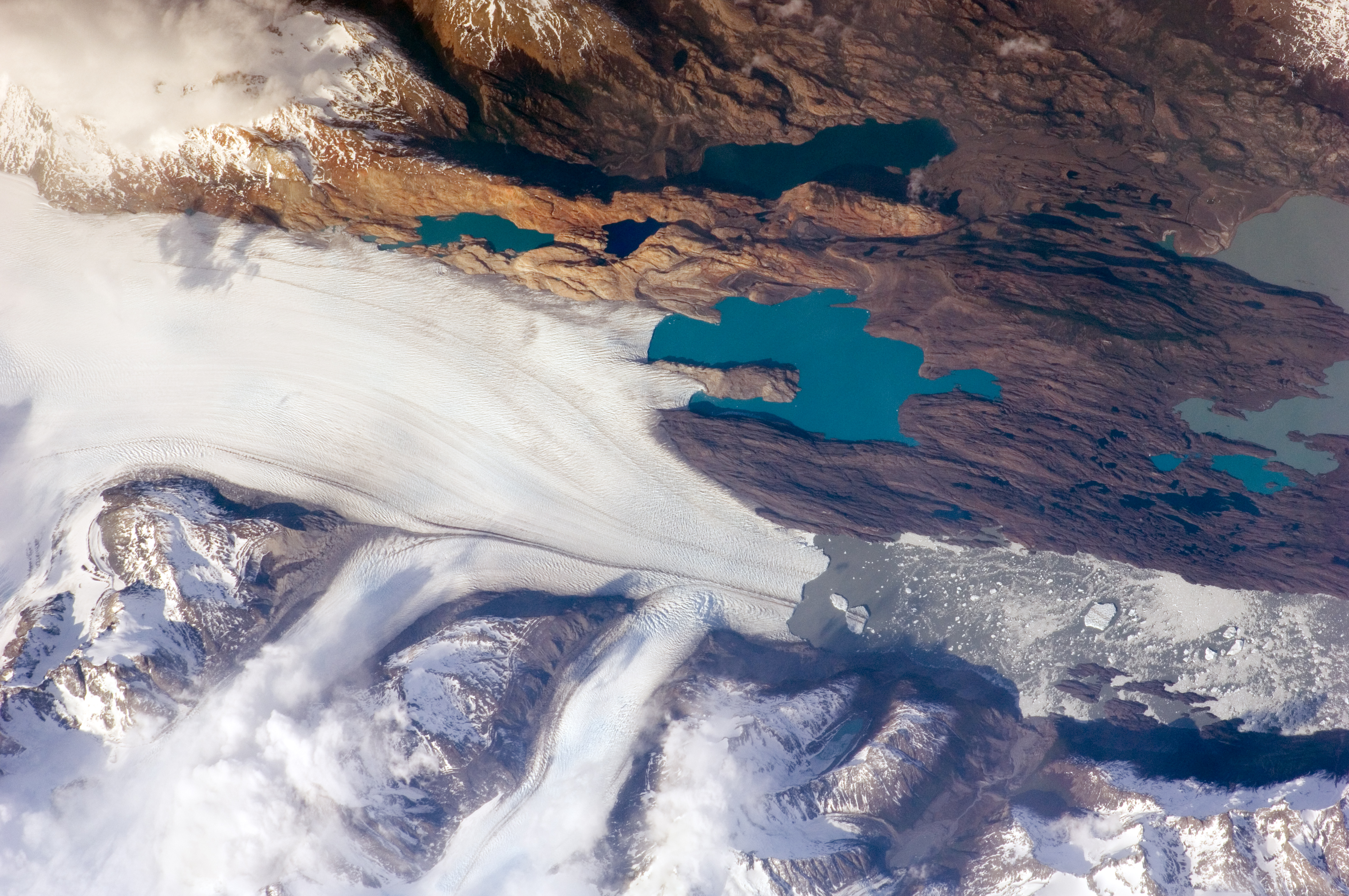
Upsala Glacier as seen from the International Space Station, October 2009. Click here for photo notes.

The Upsala Glacier is a large valley glacier on the eastern side of the Southern Patagonian Ice Field. Its higher portion lies in a disputed territory between Chile and Argentina. While the glacier flows from north to south it has three lesser eastflowing tributary glacier: Bertacchi, Cono and Murallón. Each year, over 700,000 tourists visit Los Glaciares National Park, where this glacier is located, but most go to Perito Moreno glacier as it has easier accessibility.

The name of this glacier comes from the old spelling with one p of Uppsala University, which sponsored the first glaciological studies in the area. The university is located in Uppsala, Sweden.

Uppsala glacier is one of the most famous in this region. Although it is dwarfed in popularity in terms of number of visitors from nearby Perito Moreno, it is still an important part of the local tourism infrastructure in the Argentinian Patagonia region. It is one of the most popular day tours from the nearby city of El Calafate, Argentina. People can take 4x4 vehicles as well as hike to get nearby this glacier and have vantage point views of this region.

The glacier terminus is at Upsala channel of Lago Argentino. The Upsala Glacier is well known for its rapid retreat; retreat has been ongoing since the glacier was first documented in 1810. It is still the third largest glacier in this icefield.

Upsala Glacier exhibited almost continual recession up until 1999. The acceleration in ice motion during the two decades preceding 1999 may have been augmented by the release of backstress when the glacier retreated beyond the islands in Brazo Upsala. In 2008, another period of even faster retreat started, reported as being about 10 times faster than the period recorded in the eight years prior.

As of 2018 Upsala Glacier has retreated to such degree that it no longer constrained by its tributary Bertacchi Glacier. At parts the velocity of flow is also thought to have increased in Bertacchi Glacier as result of the near-separation from Upsala Glacier. This glacier has been cited as an exemplar of climate change as it is vulnerable and visibly changing due to increasing temperatures as well as changes in precipitation.

Upsala Glacier

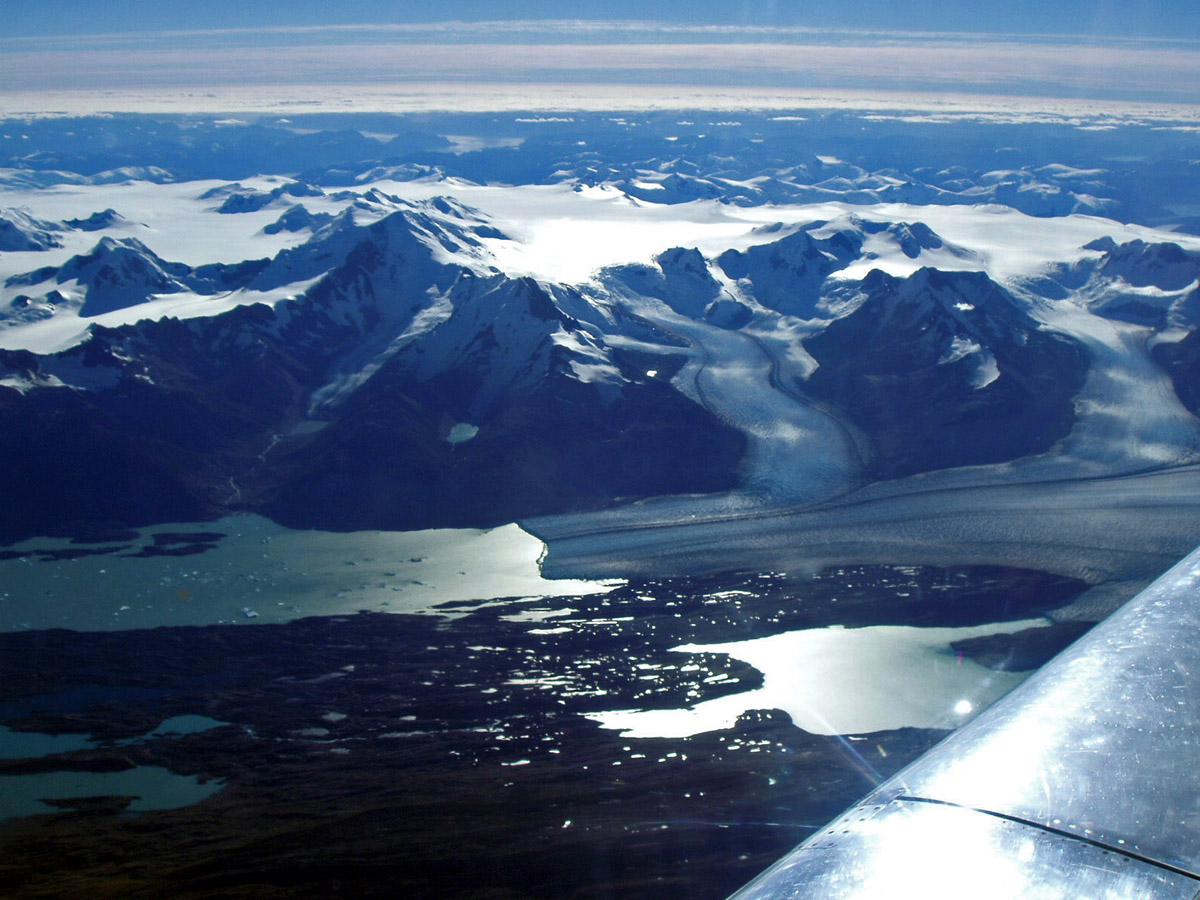
The Upsala, aerial view

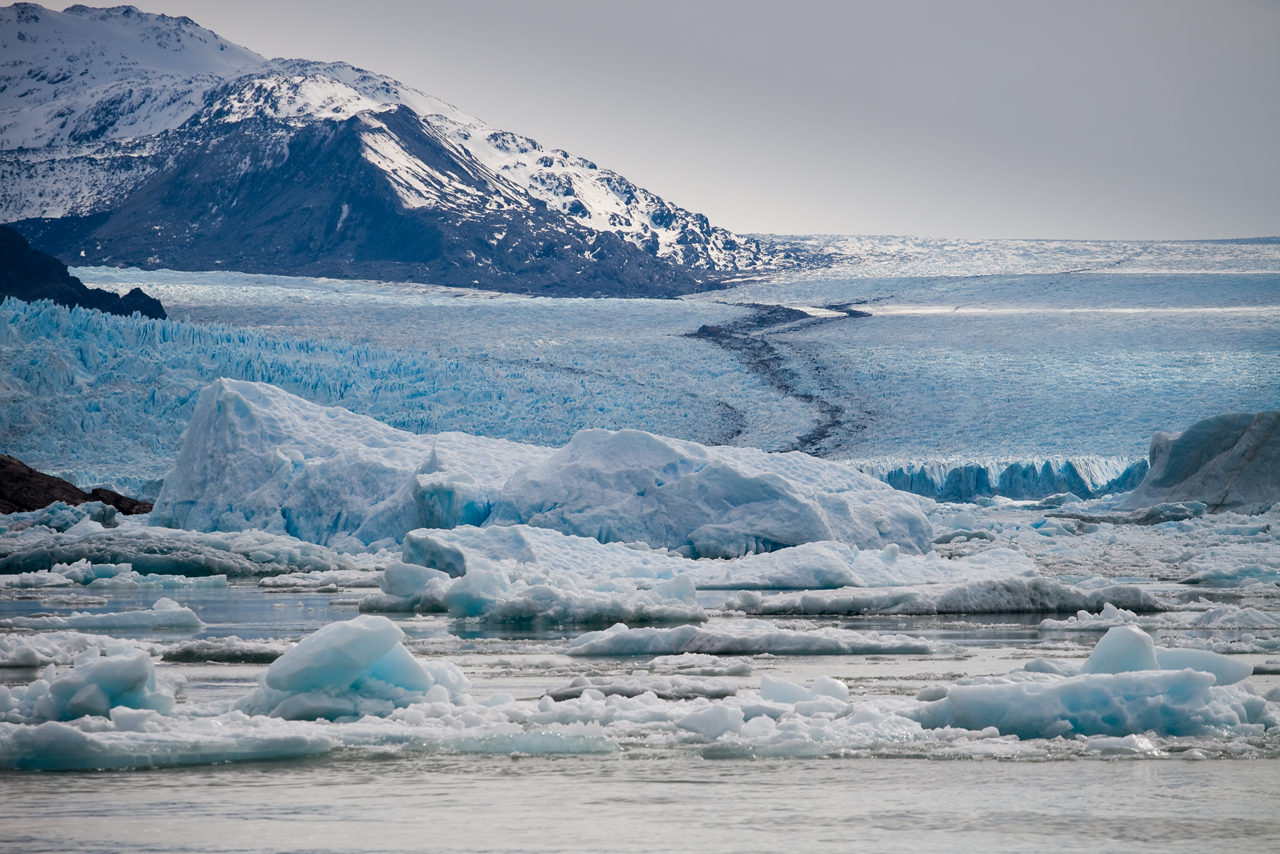
View from the Argentino Lake

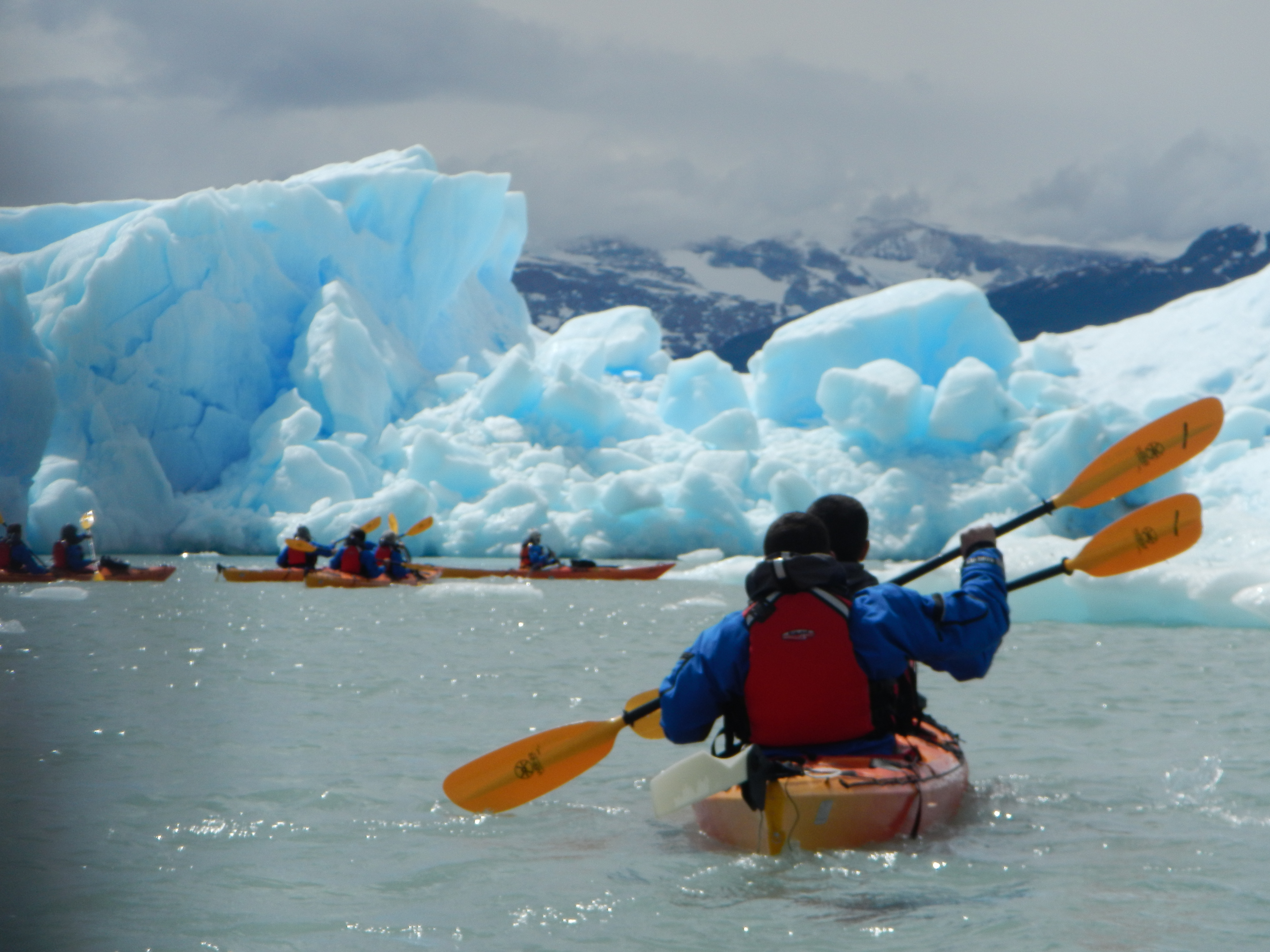
Kayaking in the Upsala Glacier

Upsala Glacier in September 2026 (photo taken from ISS)

== See also ==
- List of glaciers
- Retreat of glaciers since 1850
