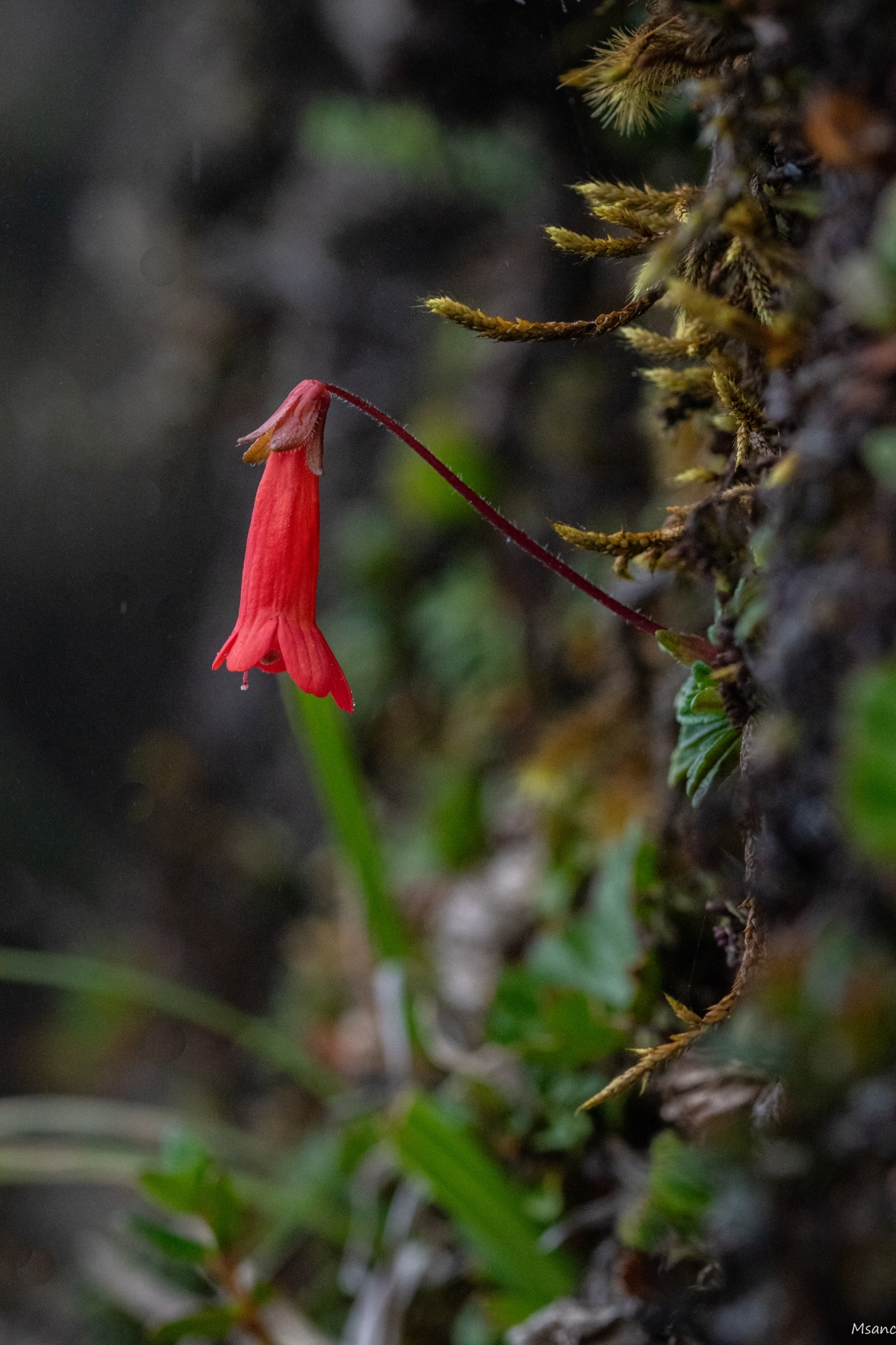
- Ourisia chamaedrifolia flower observed in Peru

Scientific classification
- Kingdom: Plantae
- Clade: Tracheophytes
- Clade: Angiosperms
- Clade: Eudicots
- Clade: Asterids
- Order: Lamiales
- Family: Plantaginaceae
- Genus: Ourisia
- Species: O. chamaedrifolia

Binomial name
- Ourisia chamaedrifolia Benth.

Synonyms
- Ourisia chamaedrifolia var. elegans Wedd., Ourisia rupicola Wedd.

= Ourisia chamaedrifolia =

Species of flowering plant

Ourisia chamaedrifolia is a species of flowering plant in the family Plantaginaceae that is endemic to páramo habitats in the Tropical Andes mountains of Venezuela, Colombia, Ecuador, Peru and Bolivia. George Bentham described O. chamaedrifolia in 1846. Plants of this species of South American foxglove are small, perennial, and repent herbs with opposite, crenate, and often hairy leaves. There can be up to four flowers on a short raceme, and each flower has a regular calyx, and a long, tubular, red or orange-red nearly bilabiate corolla with exserted stamens. The calyx and corolla are often hairless.

== Taxonomy ==
Ourisia chamaedrifolia Benth. is in the plant family Plantaginaceae. British botanist George Bentham described O. chamaedrifolia in Augustin Pyramus de Candolle's 1846 publication, Prodromus.

The type material was collected by Scottish-Ecuadorian botanist William Jameson on Pichincha in Ecuador. The lectotype was designated by Heidi Meudt and is housed as part of the de Candolle collection at the herbarium of the Geneva Botanical Garden (Herbarium G).

Ourisia chamaedrifolia var. elegans and O. rupicola were both described by French botanist Hugh Algernon Weddell and both are synonyms of O. chamaedrifolia.

Ourisia chamaedrifolia is one of five species of Ourisia in the Tropical Andes, together with O. muscosa, O. pulchella, O. biflora, and O. cotapatensis. All five species are in the herbaceous subgenus Ourisia. Of these, O. chamaedrifolia is distinctive in its long, red or orange-red, glabrous, tubular corollas. Although the pollination biology of O. chamaedrifolia has not been studied, the colour, shape and vertical orientation of its corollas suggests hummingbird pollination.

== Description ==
Ourisia chamaedrifolia plants are perennial, repent herbs. The trailing, branching stems are 1.2–2.9 mm wide, and glabrous (hairless) or hairy with short non-glandular hairs. Leaves are tightly clustered, often tufted near the growing tip of the stem, opposite, petiolate, 3.0–19.9 mm long by 1.6–15.6 mm wide (length: width ratio 1.1–2.8:1). Leaf petioles are 1.5–20.0 mm long and sparsely to densely hairy with long non-glandular hairs mostly near the edges. Leaf blades can be lanceolate to broadly ovate, narrowly to broadly elliptic, or obovate, are widest below, at or above the middle, with a rounded or acute apex, usually cuneate base, and toothed or notched edges on the distal two-thirds of the lamina. Leaves on both surfaces are hairy with a long, densely distributed non-glandular hairs mostly near the edges and on leaf veins, or sometimes glabrous. Inflorescences are erect, with hairy racemes up to 85 mm long, and with 1–4 flowering nodes and up to 4total flowers per raceme. Each flowering node has up to 2 flowers and 2 sessile and clasping bracts that are usually lanceolate to ovate or narrowly oblanceolate to obovate. The lowest bracts are similar to the leaves, 3.9–14.3 mm long and 1.5–6.0 mm wide, and become smaller toward the apex of the raceme. The flowers are borne on a pedicel that is up to 41.0 mm long and has sparsely to densely distributed, short or long non-glandular hairs, and rarely also with a few glandular hairs. The calyx is 4.3–9.4 mm long, subregular or regular, with all lobes divided to half, three-quarters or all the way to the base, hairless or with few to many short to long non-glandular hairs on the margins and veins, and sometimes also with sparsely distributed sessile glandular hairs inside and on the outside of the calyx. The corolla is 12.8–26.0 mm long (including the 9.9–20.9 mm long corolla tube), irregular (subbilabiate), tubular or tubular-funnelform, red or orange-red, glabrous or rarely with a few non-glandular hairs on the outside, and glabrous and with yellow to dark red lines, dots or patches of colour on the inside, with some glandular hairs at the bases of the filaments of the stamens. The corolla lobes are 2.2–6.5 mm long, spreading, rounded, obovate, and with irregular edges. There are 4 stamens up to 24.8 mm long which are didynamous, with two long stamens that are exserted, and two short stamens that are included within the corolla tube or reaching the tube opening; a short staminode 0.7–5.5 mm long is also present. The style is 10.5–18.6 mm long, included or slightly exserted, with an capitate stigma. The ovary is 2.2–3.7 mm long and usually glabrous. Fruits are capsules 3.8–6.4 mm long and 3.3–5.2 mm wide with loculicidal dehiscence and pedicels up to 48.0 mm long. The number of seeds in each capsule is unknown, and seeds are 0.3–0.9 mm long and 0.2–0.6 mm wide, elliptic, with a weakly two-layered (or sometimes one-layered) reticulate (having a net-like pattern) seed coat with thick, smooth, shallow, primary reticula.

Ourisia chamaedrifolia flowers and fruits throughout the year.

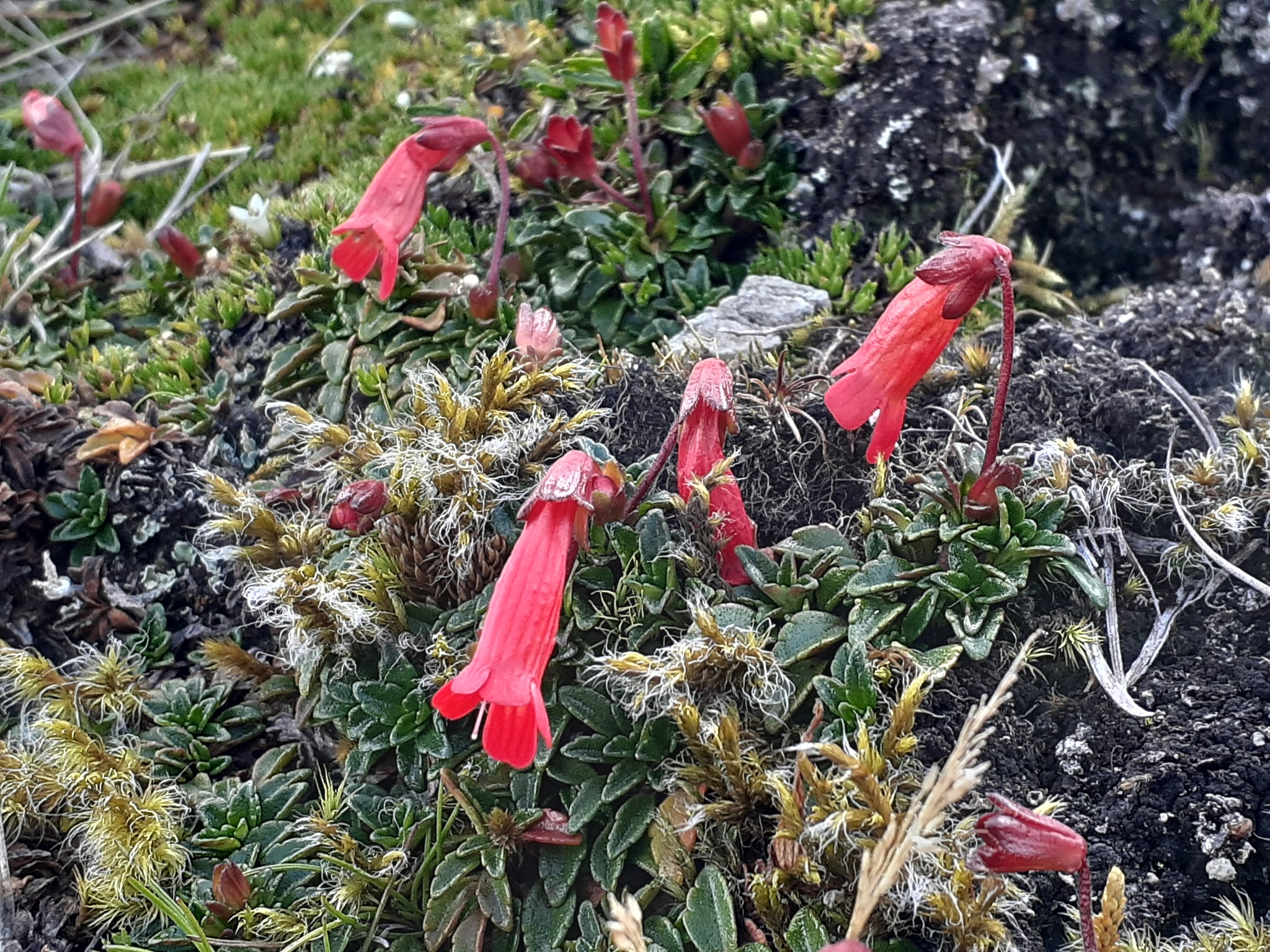
Red, tubular, vertically oriented flowers, leaves and creeping habit of O. chamaedrifolia, growing amongst mosses and cushion plants in Peru

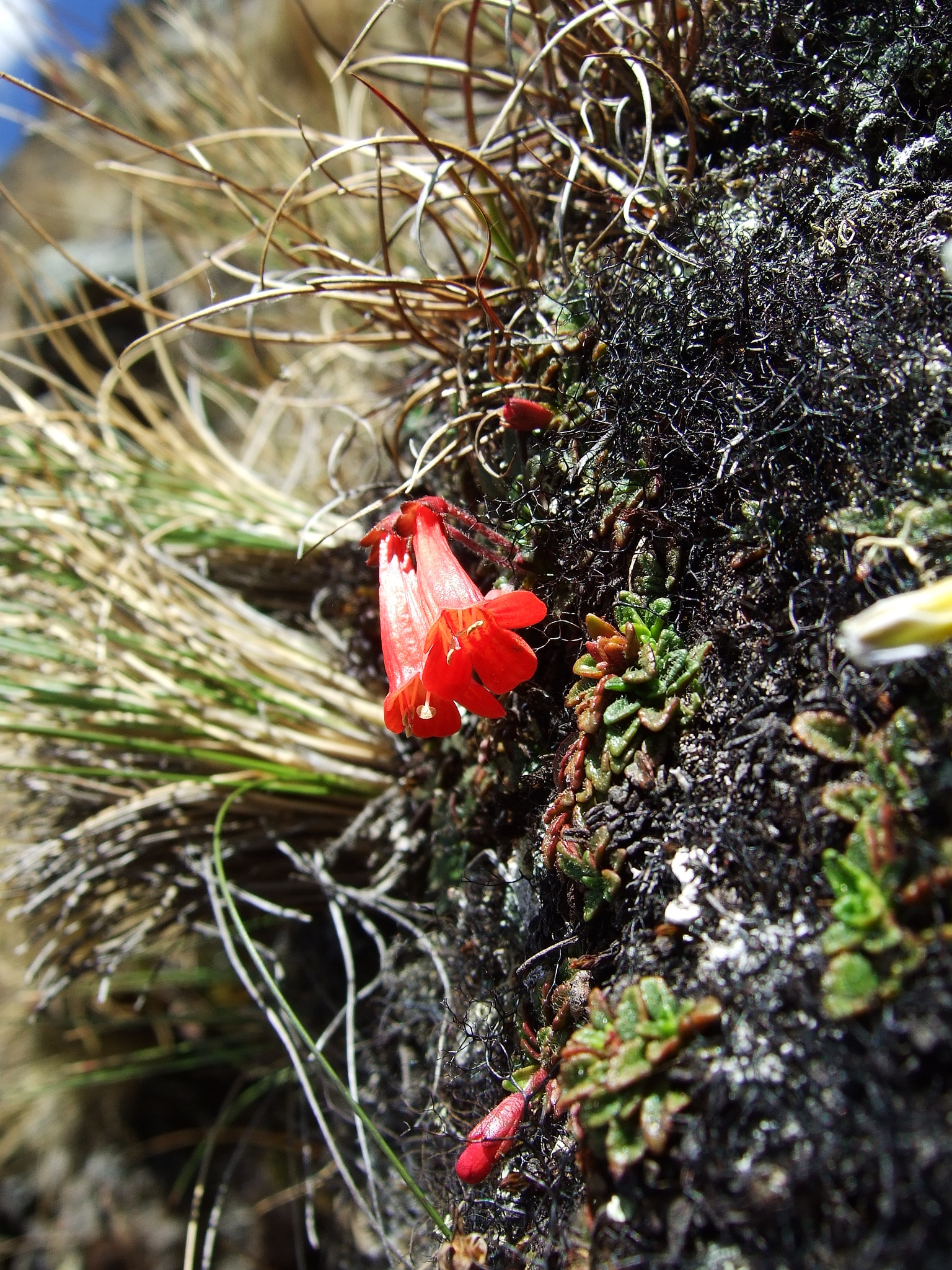
Flowering O. chamaedrifolia growing amongst grasses on a vertical slope in Peru

The chromosome number of Ourisia chamaedrifolia is unknown.

== Distribution and habitat ==
Ourisia chamaedrifolia is found throughout the Andes from 8°N to 18°S latitude in Venezuela, Colombia, Ecuador, Peru and Bolivia. This species is found in wet or rocky high-elevation páramo, superpáramo and puna habitats including bogs, as well as rocky places, from 2000 to 5000 m above sea level.

Plants of O. chamaedrifolia have been called "casepitose hemicryptophytes" and may be found with mosses, grasses, cushion plants, ferns and shrubs, and sometimes in forest containing Polylepis or Espeletia.

== Phylogeny ==
Four of the five Tropical Andean species of Ourisia were sampled for phylogenetic analysis of all species of the genus Ourisia, including one individual of O. chamaedrifolia, using standard DNA sequencing markers (two nuclear ribosomal DNA markers and two chloroplast DNA regions) and morphological data. Ourisia chamaedrifolia was always placed with high support in the north-central Andean clade, especially near O. cotapatensis and O. pulchella; O. muscosa was usually the sister species to these three species.
