= Ourisia cotapatensis =

Scientific classification
- Kingdom: Plantae
- Clade: Tracheophytes
- Clade: Angiosperms
- Clade: Eudicots
- Clade: Asterids
- Order: Lamiales
- Family: Plantaginaceae
- Genus: Ourisia
- Species: O. cotapatensis

Binomial name
- Ourisia cotapatensis Meudt & S.Beck

Species of flowering plant

Ourisia cotapatensis is a species of flowering plant in the family Plantaginaceae that is endemic to high-elevation habitats in the Tropical Andes mountains of the La Paz Department in Bolivia. Heidi Meudt and Stephan Georg Beck described O. cotapatensis in 2003. Plants of this species of South American foxglove are small, perennial, and repent herbs with opposite, anisophyllous, punctate, hairy leaves. There can be up to four flowers on a short raceme, and each flower has a regular calyx, and a violet, tubular-funnelform, bilabiate corolla with purple spots in the corolla tube and included stamens. The calyx is hairy on the outside, and the corolla has a ring of hairs at the tube opening as well as a line of hairs on the inside. This species is known only from Cotapata National Park, for which it is named.

== Taxonomy ==
Ourisia cotapatensis Meudt & S.Beck is in the plant family Plantaginaceae. American-New Zealand botanist Heidi Meudt and German-Bolivian botanist Stephan Georg Beck described O. cotapatensis in 2003. It is known only from Cotapata National Park, for which it is named.

The type material was collected by Beck in 1996 in the La Paz Department of Bolivia (Beck 22777). The holotype is housed at the National Herbarium of Bolivia (herbarium LPB), with isotypes at the herbaria of the University of Texas at Austin (TEX), Botanische Staatssammlung München (M), New York Botanical Garden (NY) and the Higher University of San Simón (BOLV).

Ourisia cotapatensis is one of five species of Ourisia in the Tropical Andes, together with O. muscosa, O. pulchella, O. chamaedrifolia, and O. biflora. All five species are in the herbaceous subgenus Ourisia. The violet, bilabiate corollas of Ourisia cotapatensis also differ from the corollas of the other Tropical Andean species, i.e. the red, bilabiate corollas of O. chamaedrifolia, the white, regular corollas of O. muscosa and O. biflora, and the white or pale violet, bilabiate corollas of O. pulchella.

Of the Tropical Andean species, O. cotapatensis is most similar to O. pulchella, with which it shares bilabiate corollas 1–2 cm long that are hairy inside, and leaves up to 1 cm long. It can be distinguished from O. pulchella by its violet, curved corollas that have purple spots (vs. white or pale violet without spots in O. pulchella) that have a ring of hairs at the tube opening as well as a line of hairs between the two long stamens (vs. hairy throughout the tube), all five calyx lobes divided equally to the base of the calyx (vs. three lobes divided to halfway and two divided to the base), petioles that are usually glabrous (vs. sparsely hairy), and leaves that are c. 2-5 mm long and evenly spaced along the creeping rhizome (vs. tightly packed).

Ourisia cotapatensis has anisophyllous leaves, as do two other species of Ourisia from New Zealand, O. caespitosa and O. glandulosa, but no other South American species have this characteristic.

== Description ==
Ourisia cotapatensis plants are perennial, repent herbs. The short stems are 0.5–1.1 mm wide, and glabrous (hairless) or hairy with short non-glandular hairs. Leaves are opposite, spaced 1.0–7.5 mm apart, anisophyllous, petiolate, 1.9–5.4 mm long by 1.6–5.2 mm wide (length: width ratio 0.8–1.2:1). Leaf petioles are 0.6–2.4 mm long and usually glabrous or sometimes hairy with short non-glandular hairs. Leaf blades are broadly ovate or very broadly ovate, widest below the middle, with a rounded or subacute apex, usually cuneate base, and irregularly notched edges. The upper surfaces of the leaves are hairy with short to long, sparsely to densely distributed non-glandular hairs, the lower surfaces are glabrous, and both surfaces are punctate. Inflorescences are ascending, with hairy racemes up to 39 mm long, and with 1–3 flowering nodes and up to 4 total flowers per raceme. Each flowering node has 1 flower and 2 petiolate to sessile bracts that are lanceolate to ovate. The bracts are similar to the leaves but hairier and smaller, 2.8–4.3 mm long and 1.3–2.4 mm wide. The flowers are borne on a pedicel that is up to 11.0 mm long and has densely distributed, short non-glandular hairs. The calyx is 3.9–5.9 mm long, regular, with all five lobes divided to the base of the calyx, sparsely to densely hairy with short non-glandular hairs on the outside of the calyx. The corolla is 19.1–21.0 mm long (including an 8.5–11.4 mm long corolla tube), bilabiate, curved, tubular-funnelform, violet (and yellow with purple spots in the corolla tube), glabrous on the outside, and densely hairy inside at the tube opening and with a line of hairs between the two long stamens. The corolla lobes are 2.8–7.8 mm long, spreading, cordate or obcordate and emarginate. There are 4 stamens which are didynamous, with two long stamens reaching the tube opening, and two short stamens that are included; a short staminode is also present. The style is 7.4–8.4 mm long, included, with an capitate stigma. The ovary is 2.1–3.3 mm long and glabrous or with sessile glandular hairs. Fruits are capsules c. 4.0 mm long and c. 2.6 mm wide with loculicidal dehiscence. The number of seeds in each capsule is unknown, and seeds are c. 0.3 mm long and c. 0.1 mm wide.

Ourisia cotapatensis flowers in October, November, and February, but its fruiting period is unknown.

The chromosome number of Ourisia cotapatensis is unknown.

== Distribution and habitat ==
Ourisia cotapatensis is endemic to the La Paz Department in northwestern Bolivia, about 40 km from La Paz on the road to Coroico in the Cotapata National Park. This species is found in high-elevation, densely shaded, humid, rocky habitats in Yungas cloud forest from 3000 to 3200 m above sea level. There are few herbarium specimens or observations of it.

== Phylogeny ==
One individual of O. cotapatensis was included in phylogenetic analyses of all species of the genus Ourisia using standard DNA sequencing markers (two nuclear ribosomal DNA markers and two chloroplast DNA regions) and morphological data. Ourisia cotapatensis was consistently placed with medium to high support in the north-central Andean clade as closely related to two other sampled species from this area (O. pulchella and O. chamaedrifolia).
