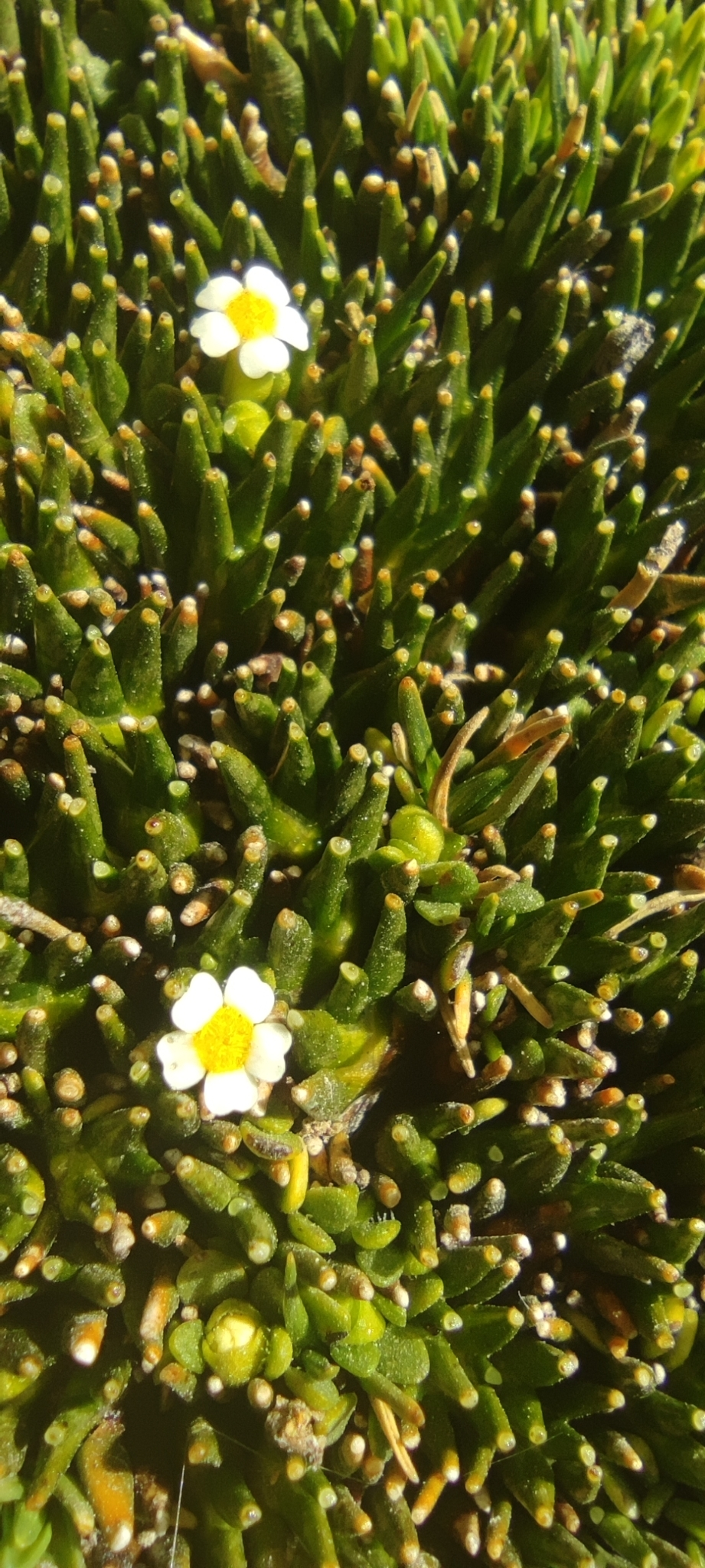
- Ourisia muscosa flowers amongst leaves of Distichia muscoides

Scientific classification
- Kingdom: Plantae
- Clade: Tracheophytes
- Clade: Angiosperms
- Clade: Eudicots
- Clade: Asterids
- Order: Lamiales
- Family: Plantaginaceae
- Genus: Ourisia
- Species: O. muscosa

Binomial name
- Ourisia muscosa Benth.

Synonyms
- Ourisia nana Benth.

= Ourisia muscosa =

Species of flowering plant

Ourisia muscosa is a species of flowering plant in the family Plantaginaceae that is endemic to páramo habitats in the Tropical Andes mountains of Colombia, Ecuador, Peru, Bolivia and Chile. George Bentham described O. muscosa in 1846. Plants of this species of South American foxglove are small, perennial, and repent herbs with entire and tightly clustered, sometimes opposite, leaves. The flowers are solitary, with a regular calyx, and a regular corolla, and with two floral bracts that cover the calyx. The calyx has tiny glandular hairs, whereas the corolla is glabrous and white on the outside, and yellow and hairy inside.

== Taxonomy ==
Ourisia muscosa Benth. is in the plant family Plantaginaceae. British botanist George Bentham described O. muscosa in Augustin Pyramus de Candolle's 1846 publication, Prodromus.

The type material was collected by Scottish-Ecuadorian botanist William Jameson on Pichincha in Ecuador. The holotype is housed at the Herbarium at the Royal Botanical Gardens at Kew (K000195395), with possible isotypes at the Natural History Museum (Herbarium BM) and Kew (K).

Ourisia nana Benth. was described in the same publication by George Bentham and is a synonym of O. muscosa. The holotype of O. nana was collected by German botanist Karl Theodor Hartweg on Antisana in Ecuador (K000195055).

Ourisia muscosa is one of five species of Ourisia in the Tropical Andes, together with O. chamaedrifolia, O. pulchella, O. biflora, and O. cotapatensis. All five species are in the herbaceous subgenus Ourisia. Of these, O. muscosa is perhaps most similar to O. biflora, with which it shares small, regular corollas (less than 9 mm long) and small leaves (less than 6 mm long). It can be distinguished from O. biflora by its very small habit, entire leaves (vs. crenate, undulate or subentire leaves), corollas less than 5 mm long (vs. longer than 5.5 mm), ovate to very broadly ovate sepals (vs. lanceolate to narrowly ovate), and floral bracts that cover the calyx of each flower (vs. much lower on the pedicel and not covering the calyx).

Ourisia muscosa can be distinguished from all other species of Ourisia by the placement of the floral bracts, which completely cover the calyx of each solitary flower, and its distinctive muscosa-type seeds. The small white, regular corolla of O. muscosa flowers can be up to 6 mm wide, has completely reflexed corolla lobes, and has a ring of yellow hairs inside the corolla tube.

== Description ==
Herbarium specimen of O. mucosa showing the diminutive habit and leaves

Ourisia muscosa plants are perennial, mat-forming, repent herbs. The branching stems are 0.8–1.5 mm wide, usually glabrous (hairless) or with few non-glandular hairs. Leaves are tightly clustered or sometimes opposite, petiolate, 1.4–3.3 mm long by 0.9–2.5 mm wide (length: width ratio 1.2–1.8:1); petioles are 0.3–6.2 mm long and 0.2–1.1 mm wide. The lamina are usually narrowly to broadly ovate, or sometimes elliptic, widest at or below the middle, with a rounded apex, cuneate base, and smooth edges. Leaves are either glabrous or densely hairy on the upper surface with non-glandular hairs often near the edges, and glabrous and punctate on the lower surface. Flowers are solitary. Two bracts are present the base of each flower, covering the calyx. The flowers are borne on a pedicel that is up to 1.4 mm long and hairless or with densely distributed, sessile glandular hairs between the floral bracts and calyx only. The calyx is 1.1–2.2 mm long, regular, usually with all lobes divided to one-half or three-quarters the length of the base, and covered with densely distributed, sessile glandular hairs, and sometimes also isolated to densely distributed non-glandular hairs on the distal edges. The corolla is 4.0–5.2 mm long (including the 3.1–4.3 mm long corolla tube), regular, tubular, white, and glabrous on the outside, and yellow and with a ring of yellow hairs on the inside, and some tiny glandular hairs at the base of the filaments. The corolla lobes are 0.8–1.3 mm long, reflexed, and obovate. There are 4 stamens up to 3.5 mm long which are didynamous, with two long stamens that are included within the corolla tube and two short stamens that are also included within the corolla tube; a short staminode 0.1–0.2 mm long is also present. The style is 0.7–2.1 mm long, included, with a capitate or emarginate stigma. The ovary is 0.9–1.5 mm long and hairless or covered with tiny glandular hairs. Fruits are capsules 2.4–2.8 mm long and 2.1–2.4 mm wide with loculicidal dehiscence and pedicels up to 6.1 (or rarely 18.1) mm long. It is unknown how many tiny seeds are in each capsule, and seeds are 0.8–1.1 mm long and 0.3–0.5 mm wide, narrowly-elliptic, with a one-layered, reticulate (having a net-like pattern) seed coat with shallow, smooth-striate testas within each of the rectangular cells of the primary reticulum.

Ourisia muscosa flowers and fruits throughout the year.

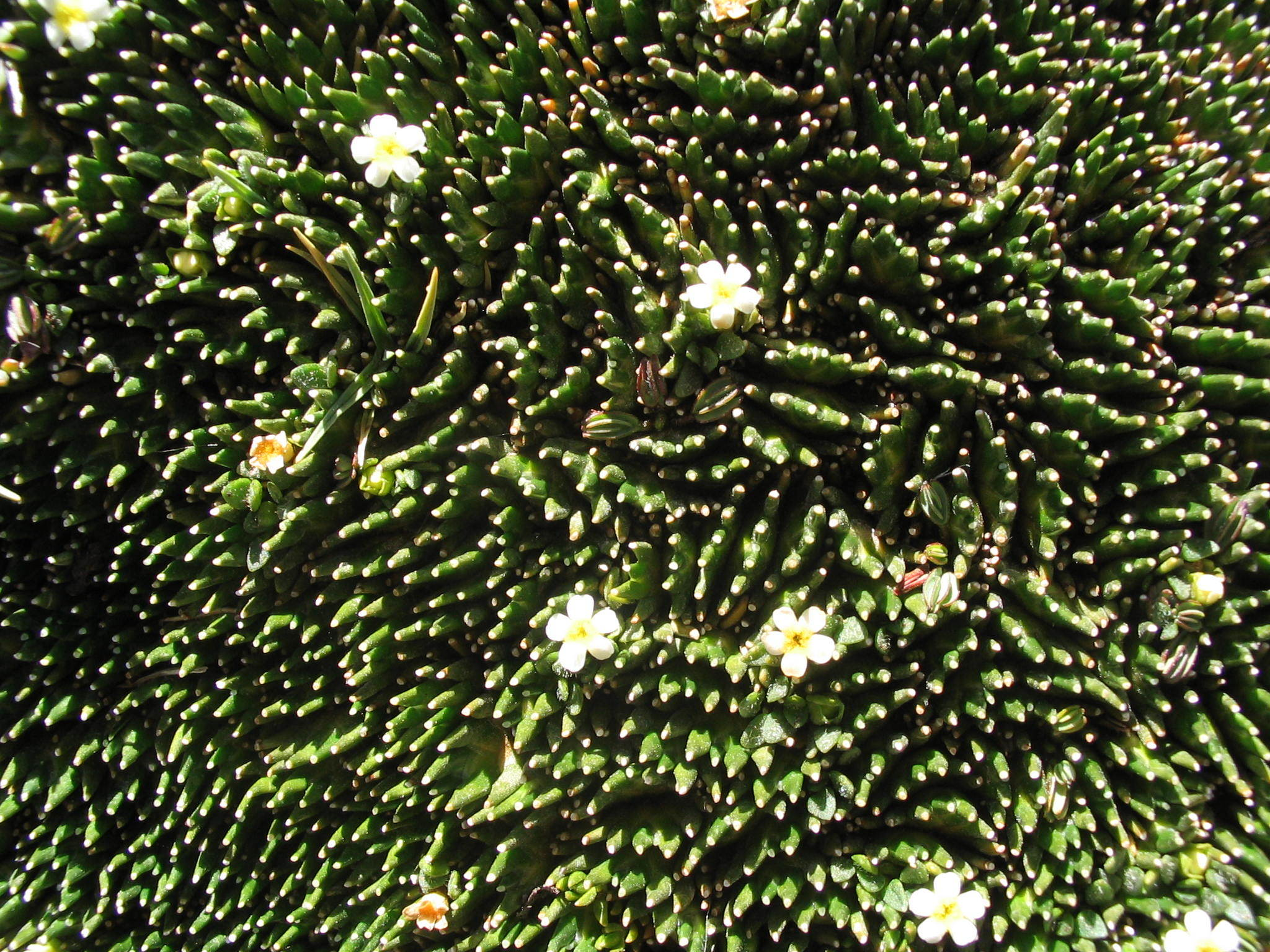
Ourisia muscosa growing with the cushion plant Distichia muscoices

The chromosome number of Ourisia muscosa is unknown.

== Distribution and habitat ==
Ourisia muscosa is found throughout the Andes from 5°N to 19°S latitude in Colombia, Ecuador, Peru, Bolivia and northern Chile. This species is commonly found in wet or rocky high-elevation páramo, superpáramo and puna habitats including bogs, stream banks, lake edges, meadows, and rocky slopes from 3800 to 5000 m above sea level.

Plants of O. muscosa have been called "casepitose hemicryptophytes", and may be found growing on or with cushion plants such as Distichia or Pycnophyllum or Plantago rigida. This species is often found in habitats with deep peat soils and is one of several diagnostic or indicator species of upper humid superpáramo vegetation.

== Phylogeny ==
One individual of O. muscosa was included in phylogenetic analyses of all species of the genus Ourisia using standard DNA sequencing markers (two nuclear ribosomal DNA markers and two chloroplast DNA regions) and morphological data. Ourisia muscosa was usually placed with medium to high support in the north-central Andean clade as the sister species to the other three sampled species from this area (O. pulchella, O. chamaedrifolia and O. cotapatensis).
