= Ourisia biflora =

Scientific classification
- Kingdom: Plantae
- Clade: Tracheophytes
- Clade: Angiosperms
- Clade: Eudicots
- Clade: Asterids
- Order: Lamiales
- Family: Plantaginaceae
- Genus: Ourisia
- Species: O. biflora

Binomial name
- Ourisia biflora Wedd.

Species of flowering plant

Ourisia biflora is a species of flowering plant in the family Plantaginaceae that is endemic to high-elevation habitats in the Tropical Andes mountains of southern Peru and northwestern Bolivia. Hugh Algernon Weddell described O. biflora in 1860. Plants of this species of South American foxglove are small, perennial, and repent herbs with opposite, and often hairy leaves. There can be up to two flowers on a short raceme, and each flower has a regular calyx, and a long, regular, tubular-funnelform, white corolla (tinged pink or violet) with included stamens. The calyx is densely hairy, whereas the corolla is hairless on the outside but densely hairy on the inside near the tube opening.

== Taxonomy ==
Ourisia biflora is in the plant family Plantaginaceae. Anglo-French botanist Hugh Algernon Weddell described O. biflora in his book, Chloris Andina, in 1860.

The type material was collected in 1857 by French botanist and mining engineer Gilbert Mandon in the mountains near Sorata in Bolivia. The holotype is housed at the National Museum of Natural History, France (herbarium P).

Ourisia biflora is one of five species of Ourisia in the Tropical Andes, together with O. muscosa, O. pulchella, O. chamaedrifolia, and O. cotapatensis. All five species are in the herbaceous subgenus Ourisia. Of these, O. biflora is perhaps most similar to O. muscosa, with which it shares small, regular corollas (less than 9 mm long) and small leaves (less than 6 mm long). It can be distinguished from O. muscosa by its crenate, undulate or subentire leaves (vs. entire leaves), corollas longer than 5.5 mm long (vs. less than 5 mm), lanceolate to narrowly ovate sepals (vs. ovate to very broadly ovate), and floral bracts low on the pedicel and not covering the calyx (vs. much higher on the pedicel that cover the calyx of each flower). Ourisia biflora is also larger (>11.6 mm tall) with larger leaves (>3.5 mm long) compared to O. muscosa.

== Description ==
Ourisia biflora plants are perennial, repent herbs. The short stems are 1.1–1.4 mm wide, and glabrous (hairless) or hairy with short non-glandular hairs. Leaves are tightly clustered, often tufted near the growing tip of the stem, opposite, petiolate, 3.5–6.1 mm long by 2.6–4.4 mm wide (length: width ratio 1.3–1.4:1). Leaf petioles are 1.3–7.0 mm long and sparsely hairy with short non-glandular hairs mostly near the edges. Leaf blades are narrowly ovate or ovate, are widest below the middle, with a rounded or subacute apex, usually cuneate base, and obscurely toothed edges. Leaves on both surfaces are hairy with a short, sparsely to densely distributed non-glandular hairs. Inflorescences are erect, with hairy racemes up to 13 mm long, and with 1–2 flowering nodes and up to 2 total flowers per raceme. Each flowering node has 1 flower and 2 petiolate to nearly sessile bracts that are oblanceolate to narrowly obovate. The bracts are similar to the leaves but smaller, 3.3–4.6 mm long and 1.4–1.6 mm wide. The flowers are borne on a pedicel that is up to 3.4 mm long and has sparsely to densely distributed, short non-glandular hairs. The calyx is 3.1–3.8 mm long, irregular, with three lobes divided to half the length of the calyx, and two lobes divided to three-quarters the length of the calyx, densely hairy with short non-glandular hairs on the outside of the calyx. The corolla is less than 9 mm long (including a 5.3–6.0 mm long corolla tube), regular, tubular-funnelform, white and tinged pink or violet, glabrous on the outside, and densely hairy inside at the tube opening. The corolla lobes are 1.3–2.8 mm long, spreading, obovate or obcordate, and with irregular edges. There are 4 stamens which are didynamous, with two long stamens that are included within the corolla tube or reaching the tube opening, and two short stamens that are included; a short staminode is also present. The style, ovary, fruits and seeds have not been described.

Ourisia biflora flowers in November, but its fruiting period is unknown.

The chromosome number of Ourisia biflora is unknown.

== Distribution and habitat ==
Ourisia biflora is known only from the altiplano in southeastern Peru and northwestern Bolivia from c. 14°-16°S. This species is found on rocks in high-elevation wet puna habitats from 3500 to 5000 m above sea level. There are few herbarium specimens or observations of it. The species has been reported recently in Peru from Cusco department and the Carabaya mountain range in Puno department, and in Bolivia in La Paz department including in Madidi National Park.

== Phylogeny ==
Four of the five Tropical Andean species of Ourisia were sampled for phylogenetic analysis of all species of the genus Ourisia, using standard DNA sequencing markers (two nuclear ribosomal DNA markers and two chloroplast DNA regions) and morphological data, however O. biflora was unable to be included.
