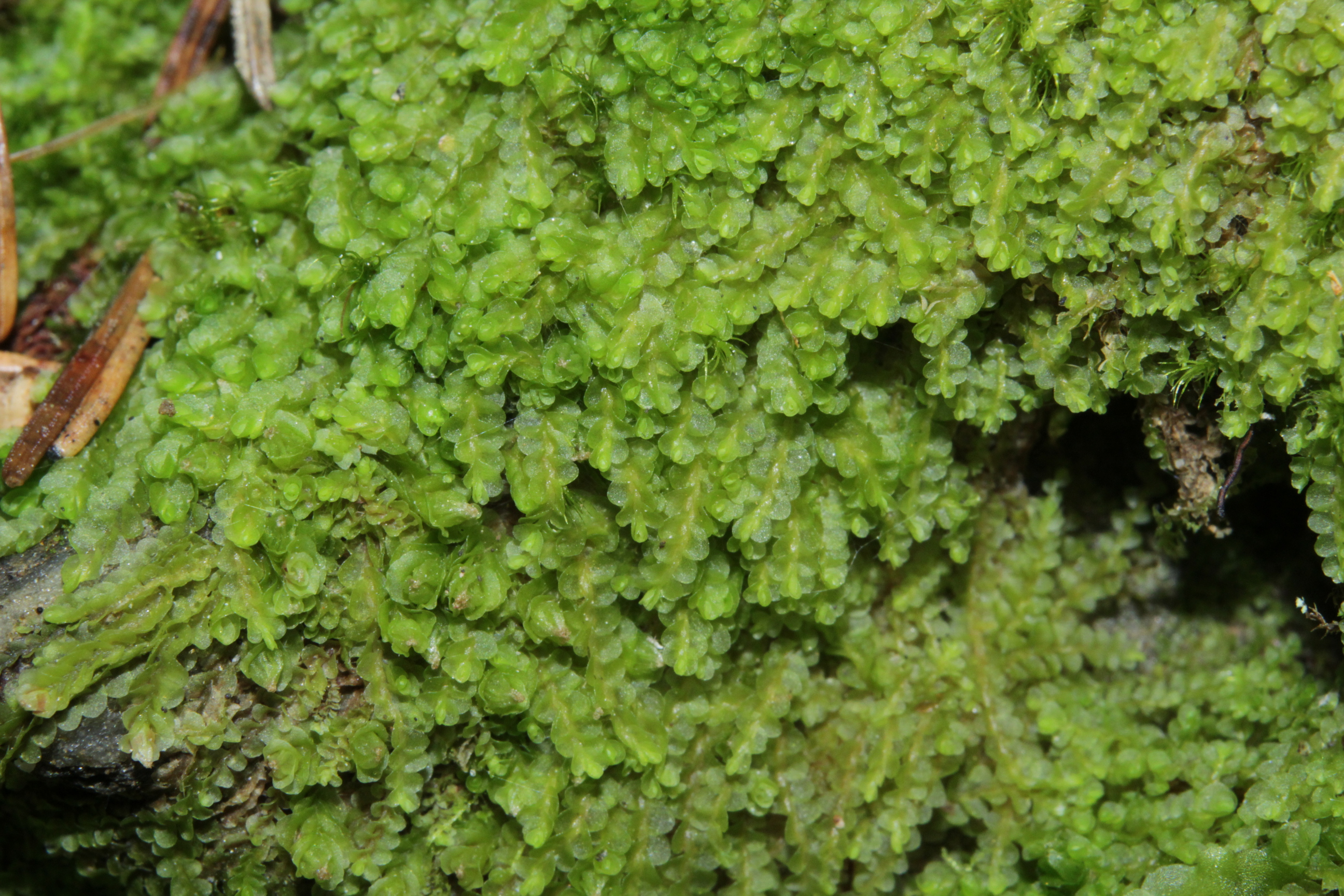
- Jungermannia hyalina

Scientific classification
- Kingdom: Plantae
- Division: Marchantiophyta
- Class: Jungermanniopsida
- Order: Jungermanniales
- Family: Jungermanniaceae; Rchb.

= Jungermanniaceae =

Family of liverworts

Jungermanniaceae is the namesake family of leafy liverworts. It is a group of small plants that are widely distributed. Several genera formerly included within the family are now classified in the Myliaceae or Solenostomataceae.

Most of the species of this family are found in temperate regions.

The main characteristics of the family:

- The leaves are succubous.
- The leaves are unlobed and never decurrent along the stem.
- Perianth is terminal on the leading shoot.
- Rhizoids are scattered along the stem.

== Description ==
The branches do not grow from the underside of the stem when the plants branch. The leaves are unlobed and have a smooth edge, and the underlobes are vestigial or absent. The rhizoids are scattered along the underside of the stem, and not restricted to specific patches near the underleaves.

== Subfamilies and genera ==
Subfamilies and genera included in Jungermanniaceae:

- Delavayelloideae Grolle
  - Delavayella Steph.
  - Liochlaena Nees
- Jungermannioideae Dumort.
  - Eremonotus Lindb. & Kaal. ex Pearson
  - Jungermannia L.
- Mesoptychioideae R.M.Schust.
  - Mesoptychia (Lindb.) A.Evans
  - Rivulariella D.H.Wagner.
- incertae sedis
  - †Jungermannites Goeppert & Berendt, 1845 - fossil morphogenus

== Notes ==
Former genera in the Jungermanniaceae:

- Cryptostipula R.M.Schust. is now a synonym of Hepatostolonophora J.J.Engel & R.M.Schust. in Lophocoleaceae family.
- Roivainenia Perss. 1961 is now a synonym of Syzygiella Spruce in Adelanthaceae family.
