= Ourisia pulchella =

Scientific classification
- Kingdom: Plantae
- Clade: Tracheophytes
- Clade: Angiosperms
- Clade: Eudicots
- Clade: Asterids
- Order: Lamiales
- Family: Plantaginaceae
- Genus: Ourisia
- Species: O. pulchella

Binomial name
- Ourisia pulchella Wedd.

Synonyms
- Ourisia pratiodes Diels

Species of flowering plant

Ourisia pulchella is a species of flowering plant in the family Plantaginaceae that is endemic to high-elevation habitats in the altiplano and puna of the Tropical Andes mountains of southern Peru and northwestern Bolivia. Hugh Algernon Weddell described O. pulchella in 1860. Plants of this species of South American foxglove are small, perennial, and repent herbs with hairy, opposite, tufted leaves. There can be up to three flowers on a short raceme, and each flower has an irregular calyx, and a long, bilabiate, tubular-funnelform, white corolla (tinged purple on the corolla tube) with included stamens. The calyx is densely hairy, whereas the corolla is hairless on the outside but densely hairy on the inside near the tube opening.

== Taxonomy ==
Ourisia pulchella is in the plant family Plantaginaceae. Anglo-French botanist Hugh Algernon Weddell described O. pulchella in his book, Chloris Andina, in 1860.

The type material was collected in December 1846 by Weddell at 3500 m elevation in the mountains of Ayopaya Province in the Cochabamba Department of Bolivia. The holotype is housed at the National Museum of Natural History, France (herbarium P) and there is an isotype at the Field Museum herbarium (herbarium F).

Ourisia pulchella is one of five species of Ourisia in the Tropical Andes, together with O. muscosa, O. biflora, O. chamaedrifolia, and O. cotapatensis. All five species are in the herbaceous subgenus Ourisia.

Of the Tropical Andean species, O. pulchella is most similar to O. cotapatensis, with which it shares leaves up to 1 cm long and bilabiate corollas 1–2 cm long that are hairy inside. It can be distinguished from O. cotapatensis by its corollas with white or pale violet without spots (vs. violet, curved corollas that have purple spots in O. cotapatensis) that are hairy throughout the tube (vs. have a ring of hairs at the tube opening as well as a line of hairs between the two long stamens), three lobes divided to halfway and two divided to the base (vs. all five calyx lobes divided equally to the base of the calyx), petioles that are sparsely hairy (vs. usually glabrous), and leaves that are tightly packed along the rhizome (vs. c. 2–5 mm long and evenly spaced along the creeping rhizome).

Ourisia pratioides was described by German botanist Ludwig Diels in 1906 and is a synonym of O. pulchella. The holotype of O. pratioides was collected by August Weberbauer in the mountains of southwestern Monzón District, Peru, in October 1903, and was housed at the Herbarium Berolinense (herbarium B) at the Berlin Botanical Garden and Botanical Museum where it was destroyed in World War II. A lectotype of O. pratioides was designated in 2018 from the Philadelphia Herbarium at the Academy of Natural Sciences (herbarium PH).

== Description ==
Ourisia pulchella plants are perennial, repent herbs. The short stems are 1.5–2.3 mm wide, and glabrous (hairless) or hairy with short non-glandular hairs. Leaves are opposite and tightly clustered near the growing tip of the stem, petiolate, 3.6–9.2 mm long by 2.5–6.8 mm wide (length: width ratio 1.5–1.8:1). Leaf petioles are 1.9–8.4 mm long and sparsely to densely hairy with long non-glandular hairs, especially on the edges. Leaf blades are narrowly ovate or broadly ovate, widest below the middle, with a rounded apex, usually cuneate base, and undulate edges. Both surfaces of the leaves are punctate, and glabrous or hairy with long, sparsely to densely distributed non-glandular hairs. Inflorescences are erect, with hairy racemes up to 53 mm long, and with 1–3 flowering nodes and up to 3 total flowers per raceme. Each flowering node has 1 flower and 2 sessile bracts that are lanceolate, broadly ovate, oblanceolate or narrowly obovate. The bracts are similar to the leaves but smaller, 2.8–4.3 mm long and 1.3–2.4 mm wide. The flowers are borne on a pedicel that is up to 19.6 mm long and has densely distributed, short to long non-glandular (or sometimes glandular) hairs. The calyx is 5.4–6.0 mm long, irregular, with 3 lobes divided to half the length of the calyx and 2 lobes divided to the base of the calyx, sparsely to densely hairy with short or long non-glandular hairs on the outside of the calyx. The corolla is longer than 10 mm long (including a 9.2–10.0 mm long corolla tube), bilabiate, slightly curved, tubular-funnelform, white (and slightly purplish on the outside of the corolla tube), glabrous on the outside, and densely hairy inside at the tube opening. The corolla lobes are 3.4–6.2 mm long, spreading, obovate or obcordate and slightly emarginate. There are 4 stamens which are didynamous, with two long stamens included or reaching the tube opening, and two short stamens that are included. The style is c. 6.2 mm long, included, with an capitate stigma. The ovary is 2.5–4.5 mm long. Fruits are capsules with loculicidal dehiscence. The number of seeds in each capsule and their size is unknown.

Ourisia pulchella flowers in October, November and February, and fruits from October.

The chromosome number of Ourisia pulchella is unknown.

== Distribution and habitat ==
Ourisia pulchella is known only from the high elevation, rocky habitats in the altiplano and puna of central Peru (Huánuco province, c. 10°S) and northwestern Bolivia (Cochabamba and La Paz Departments, c. 17°S) from 3000 to 4050 m above sea level. There are few herbarium specimens or observations of it.

== Conservation status ==
Ourisia pulchella is listed on the IUCN Red List as Data Deficient.

== Phylogeny ==
Four of the five Tropical Andean species of Ourisia were sampled, including one individual of O. pulchella, for phylogenetic analysis of all species of the genus Ourisia, using standard DNA sequencing markers (two nuclear ribosomal DNA markers and two chloroplast DNA regions) and morphological data. Ourisia pulchella was always placed with high support in the north-central Andean clade, especially near O. cotapatensis and O. chamaedrifolia; O. muscosa was usually the sister species to these three species.
