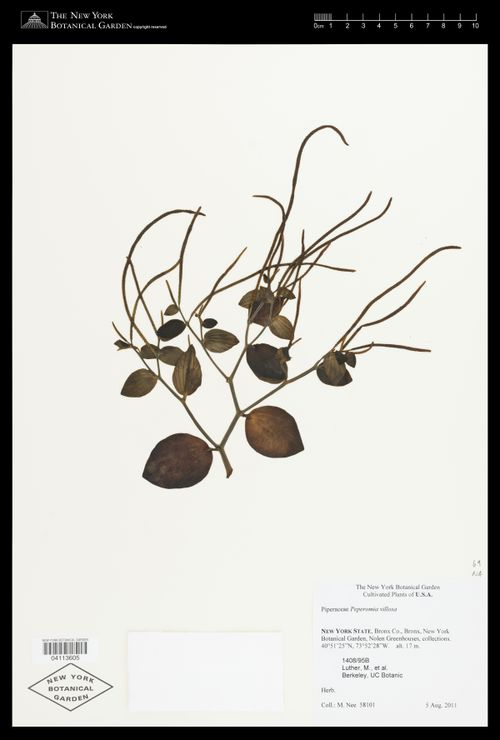

Scientific classification
- Kingdom: Plantae
- Clade: Embryophytes
- Clade: Tracheophytes
- Clade: Angiosperms
- Clade: Magnoliids
- Order: Piperales
- Family: Piperaceae
- Genus: Peperomia
- Species: P. villosa

Binomial name
- Peperomia villosa C.DC.

= Peperomia villosa =

Species of flowering plant

Peperomia villosa is a species of herb from the genus Peperomia. First specimens were collected by William Jameson. It was first described by Casimir de Candolle and published in the book "Journal of Botany, British and Foreign 4: 135. 1866.". Its etymology came from "villous", which means long soft hair.

== Distribution ==
It is endemic in Ecuador. First specimens were collected at an altitude of 9 meters (30 ft) by William Jameson.

- Ecuador
  - Cotopaxi
  - Pichincha
  - Carchi

== Description ==
Alternate leaves long right petiolate eordato-ovate apex obtuse above villous below to dry villous nerves membranaceous transparent 7-veined, axillary catkins terminal villous peduncles, submerged ovaries. Villous herb rooting at the base, leaf margin 0.035, petiole 0.03, peduncle 0.035 long.
