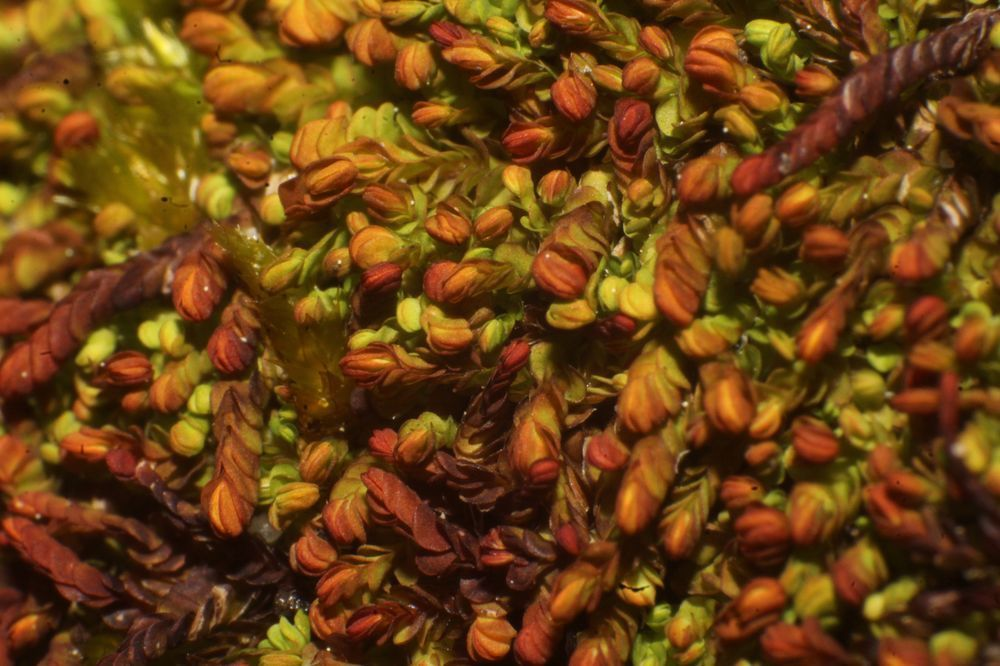

Scientific classification
- Kingdom: Plantae
- Division: Marchantiophyta
- Class: Jungermanniopsida
- Order: Lophoziales
- Family: Adelanthaceae
- Genus: Syzygiella
- Species: S. colorata

Binomial name
- Syzygiella colorata (Lehm.) K. Feldberg, Váňa, Hentschel & Heinrichs

Synonyms
- Jungermannia colorata Lehm.; Jamesoniella colorata (Lehm.) Spruce ex Schiffn.; Jamesoniella raknesii Kaal. 1911; synonymized by Grolle (1971b)

= Syzygiella colorata =

Species of liverwort

Syzygiella colorata is a species of liverwort in the family Adelanthaceae. It is found in the zone of the Antarctic Convergence. Samples have been found on the Kerguelen islands, Crozet islands, and the Prince Edward islands.

== History of discovery ==
Johann Georg Christian Lehmann originally described the species in 1829 as Jungermannia colorata. In 1893 Victor Félix Schiffner moved the species to the genus Jamesoniella. Kaalaas described what he thought was a new species in 1911, but which was later reduced to a synonym by Grolle in 1971.

== Literature ==
- Kaalaas B. 1911. "Bryophyten aus den Crozetinseln. I. Nyt Magazin Naturvidenskaberne (Kristiania) 49: 81-89
