= Buddleja jamesonii =

Conservation status
- Vulnerable (IUCN 3.1)

Scientific classification
- Kingdom: Plantae
- Clade: Embryophytes
- Clade: Tracheophytes
- Clade: Spermatophytes
- Clade: Angiosperms
- Clade: Eudicots
- Clade: Asterids
- Order: Lamiales
- Family: Scrophulariaceae
- Genus: Buddleja
- Species: B. jamesonii

Binomial name
- Buddleja jamesonii Benth.

Species of flowering plant

Buddleja jamesonii is a species endemic to southern Ecuador, where it grows in moist, protected ravines and borders of tussocks at elevations of 3,000 – 4,000 m. The species, first named and described by Bentham in 1846, is now threatened by habitat loss. The specific name commemorates the Scottish botanist William Jameson (1796–1873) who collected in Ecuador.

== Description ==
Buddleja jamesonii is a trioecious shrub 0.5 – 1.5 m high with greyish fissured bark at the base. The stems are subquadrangular and lanose, crowded with leaves on short axillary branches. The leaves are sessile, lanceolate and comparatively small, 3 – 4 cm long by 1 – 2 cm wide, lanose on both sides. The cream inflorescence typically comprises just one terminal head, occasionally with a pair of additional sessile heads, each 0.8 – 1.6 cm in diameter, with 15 – 30 flowers. The corolla is 3.5 – 4.5 mm long.

== Cultivation ==
The shrub is not known to be in cultivation.
