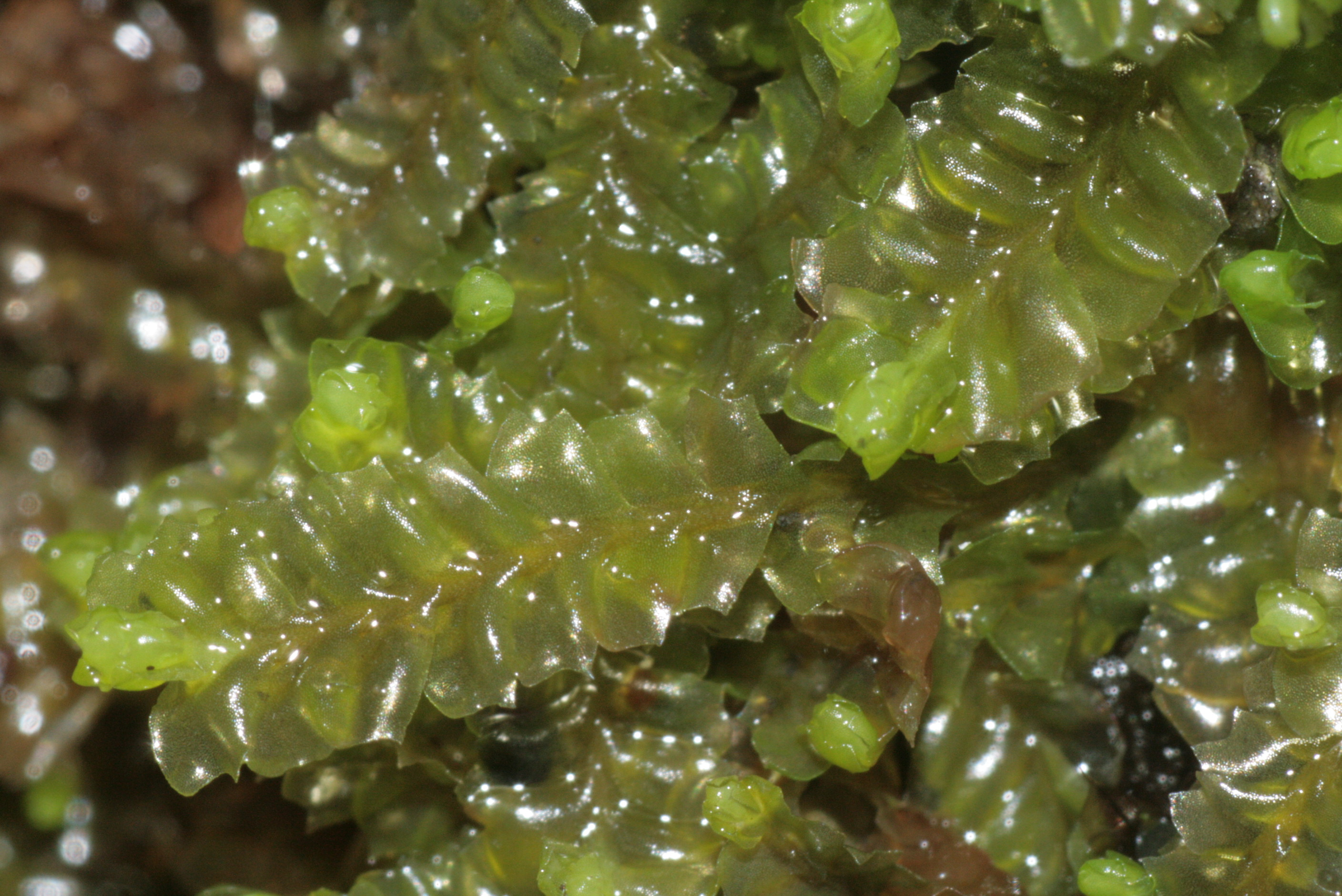
- M. badensis (formerly Leiocolea bantriensis)

Scientific classification
- Kingdom: Plantae
- Division: Marchantiophyta
- Class: Jungermanniopsida
- Order: Jungermanniales
- Family: Jungermanniaceae
- Genus: Mesoptychia (Lindb.) A.Evans

Synonyms
- Leiocolea (Müll.Frib.) H.Buch

= Mesoptychia =

Genus of liverworts

Mesoptychia is a genus of liverworts belonging to the family Jungermanniaceae.

The species of this genus are all found in the northern Hemisphere.

== Species ==
As accepted by GBIF;

- Mesoptychia badensis (Gottsche ex Rabenh.) L.Söderstr. & Váňa
- Mesoptychia bantriensis (Hook.) L.Söderstr. & Váňa
- Mesoptychia chichibuensis (Inoue) L.Söderstr. & Váňa
- Mesoptychia chinensis Bakalin, Vilnet & Y.X.Xiong
- Mesoptychia collaris (Nees) L.Söderstr. & Váňa
- Mesoptychia fitzgeraldiae (Paton & A.R.Perry) L.Söderstr. & Váňa
- Mesoptychia gillmanii (Austin) L.Söderstr. & Váňa
- Mesoptychia heterocolpos (Thed. ex Hartm.) L.Söderstr. & Váňa
- Mesoptychia igiana (S.Hatt.) L.Söderstr. & Váňa
- Mesoptychia mamatkulovii (Duda) L.Söderstr. & Váňa
- Mesoptychia mayebarae (S.Hatt.) L.Söderstr. & Váňa
- Mesoptychia morrisoncola (Horik.) L.Söderstr. & Váňa
- Mesoptychia polymorpha Stotler, Crand.-Stotl. & Bakalin
- Mesoptychia rutheana (Limpr.) L.Söderstr. & Váňa
- Mesoptychia sahlbergii (Lindb. & Arnell) A.Evans
- Mesoptychia subcrispa (Herzog) L.Söderstr. & Váňa
- Mesoptychia turbinata (Raddi) L.Söderstr. & Váňa
- Mesoptychia ussuriensis (Bakalin) L.Söderstr. & Váňa
