= Jamesoniella =

Uncertain genus of liverworts

Jamesoniella is a formerly accepted genus of liverworts. It is considered to be included in the genus Syzygiella, but one species, Jamesoniella convoluta, has not been transferred to that genus nor synonymized.

The genus was erected by Richard Spruce and Frederick Arnold Lees in 1881. The generic name is in honour of William Jameson (1796–1873), a Scottish-Ecuadorian botanist.
