= Liochlaena =

Scientific classification
- Kingdom: Plantae
- Division: Marchantiophyta
- Class: Jungermanniopsida
- Order: Jungermanniales
- Family: Jungermanniaceae
- Genus: Liochlaena; Nees

Genus of liverworts

Liochlaena is a genus of liverworts belonging to the family Jungermanniaceae.

The species of this genus are found in the Northern Hemisphere within Eurasia and parts of northern America.

== Species ==
As accepted by GBIF;

- Liochlaena laetevirens Spruce
- Liochlaena lanceolata Nees
- Liochlaena leiantha Nees
- Liochlaena picta Spruce
- Liochlaena sichuanica Bakalin & Vilnet
- Liochlaena subulata (A.Evans) Schljakov
