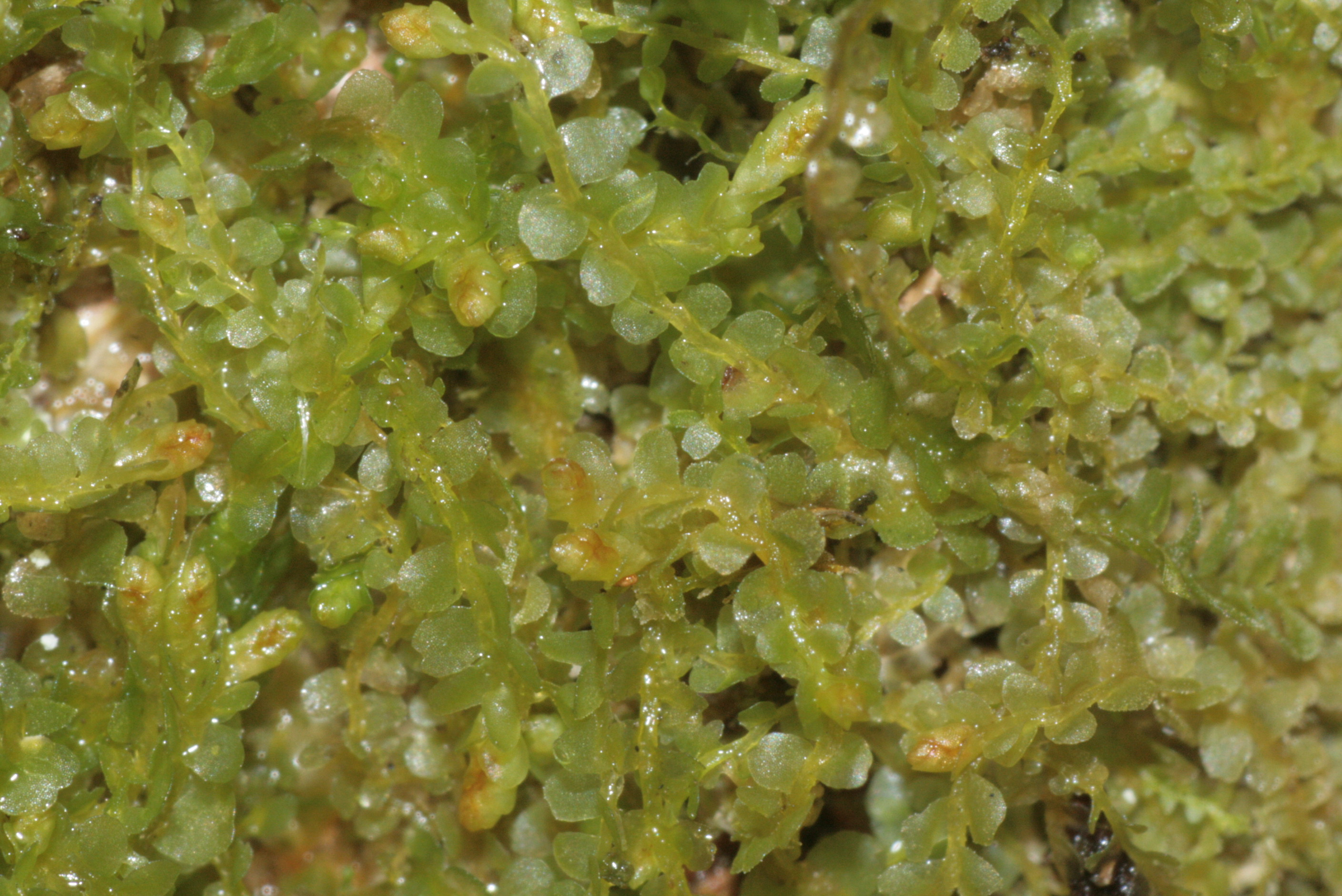
- Syzygiella autumnalis

Scientific classification
- Kingdom: Plantae
- Division: Marchantiophyta
- Class: Jungermanniopsida
- Order: Lophoziales
- Family: Adelanthaceae
- Genus: Syzygiella; Spruce

Synonyms
- Jamesoniella (Spr.) Schiffn.; Roivainenia Perss.

= Syzygiella =

Genus of liverworts

Syzygiella is a genus of liverworts belonging to the family Jungermanniaceae.

== Species ==
As accepted by GBIF;

- Syzygiella acinacifolia (Hook. f. & Taylor) K.Feldberg, Váňa, Hentschel & J.Heinrichs
- Syzygiella anomala (Lindenb. & Gottsche) Stephani
- Syzygiella apiculata Herzog
- Syzygiella autumnalis (DC.) K.Feldberg, Váňa, Hentschel & Heinrichs
- Syzygiella bilobata Inoue
- Syzygiella boliviana Steph.
- Syzygiella burghardtii Gradst. & A.R.Benitez
- Syzygiella campanulata Herzog
- Syzygiella ciliata Gradst. & A.R.Benitez
- Syzygiella colombiana H.Rob.
- Syzygiella colorata (Lehm.) K.Feldberg, Váňa, Hentschel & Heinrichs
- Syzygiella concreta (Gottsche) Spruce
- Syzygiella contigua Steph.
- Syzygiella eatonii (Austin) Inoue
- Syzygiella elongella (Taylor) K.Feldberg, Váňa, Hentschel & Heinrichs
- Syzygiella grandiflora Stephani
- Syzygiella grollei Inoue
- Syzygiella herzogiana Steph.
- Syzygiella herzogii R.M.Schust.
- Syzygiella inouei Grolle
- Syzygiella jacquinotii (Mont.) Hentschel, K.Feldberg, Váňa & Heinrichs
- Syzygiella kerguelensis M.L.So & Grolle
- Syzygiella macrocalyx (Mont.) Spruce
- Syzygiella manca (Mont.) Steph.
- Syzygiella mucronata Stephani
- Syzygiella nigrescens (Steph.) K.Feldberg, Váňa, Hentschel & Heinrichs
- Syzygiella nipponica (S.Hatt.) K.Feldberg, Váňa, Hentschel & Heinrichs
- Syzygiella nuda (Horik.) S.Hatt.
- Syzygiella oenops (Lindenb. & Gottsche) K.Feldberg, Váňa, Hentschel & Heinrichs
- Syzygiella oppositifolia (Spruce) Spruce
- Syzygiella ovalifolia Inoue
- Syzygiella paludosa (Steph.) K.Feldberg, Váňa, Hentschel & Heinrichs
- Syzygiella pectiniformis Spruce}
- Syzygiella perfoliata (Sw.) Spruce
- Syzygiella plagiochiloides Spruce
- Syzygiella pseudocclusa (E.A.Hodgs.) K.Feldberg, Váňa, Hentschel & Heinrichs
- Syzygiella purpurascens (Steph.) K.Feldberg, Váňa, Hentschel & Heinrichs
- Syzygiella quelkii Stephani
- Syzygiella renifolia Gradst. & D.P.Costa
- Syzygiella riclefii Pocs
- Syzygiella rubricaulis (Nees) Steph.
- Syzygiella securifolia (Nees) Inoue
- Syzygiella setulosa Steph.
- Syzygiella sonderi (Gottsche) K.Feldberg, Váňa, Hentschel & Heinrichs
- Syzygiella spegazziniana (Spruce ex C.Massal.) K.Feldberg, Váňa, Hentschel & Heinrichs
- Syzygiella subintegerrima (Reinw., Blume & Nees) Spruce
- Syzygiella subundulata Inoue
- Syzygiella tasmanica (Hook.f. & Taylor) K.Feldberg, Váňa, Hentschel & Heinrichs
- Syzygiella teres (Carrington & Pearson) Váňa
- Syzygiella tonduzana Steph.
- Syzygiella trigonifolia (Steph.) Herzog
- Syzygiella uleana Steph.
- Syzygiella undata (Mont.) K.Feldberg, Váňa, Hentschel & Heinrichs
- Syzygiella variabilis (Sande Lac.) Schiffner
- Syzygiella variegata (Lindenb.) Schiffner
- Syzygiella virescens Stephani
