= Anisophylly =

When leaves of a pair differ from one another

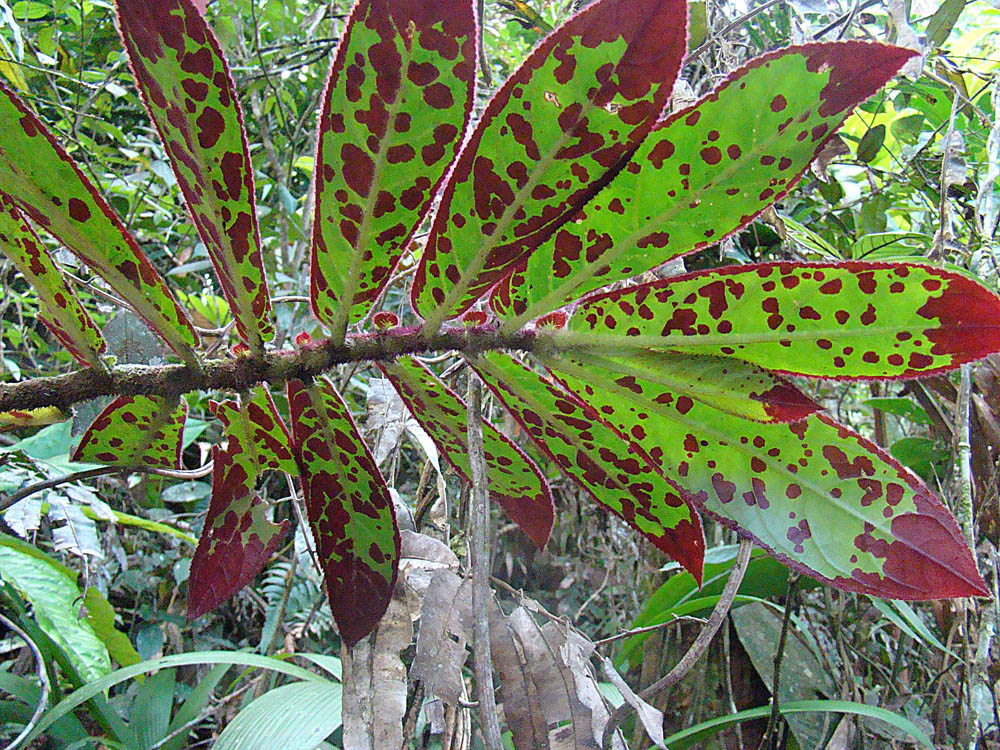
In a horizontal shoot of Columnea cruenta, as in some other species of Gesneriaceae, one of each pair of anisophyllous leaves is very small. The larger leaves are oriented at right angles to light from above.

Anisophylly is when leaves of a pair differ from one another, either in size or in shape. When a horizontal stem (plagiotropic shoot) also exhibits anisophylly, the photosynthetic leaf surfaces interfere less with light from above, and rotation of the leaf or the petiole can enhance that effect. The phenomenon is relatively common in some tropical plant families with decussate leaf arrangement, such as Melastomataceae, Gesneriaceae and Urticaceae as well as in certain species of other families.
