= William Jameson (botanist, born 1796) =

Scottish-Ecuadorian botanist (1796–1873)

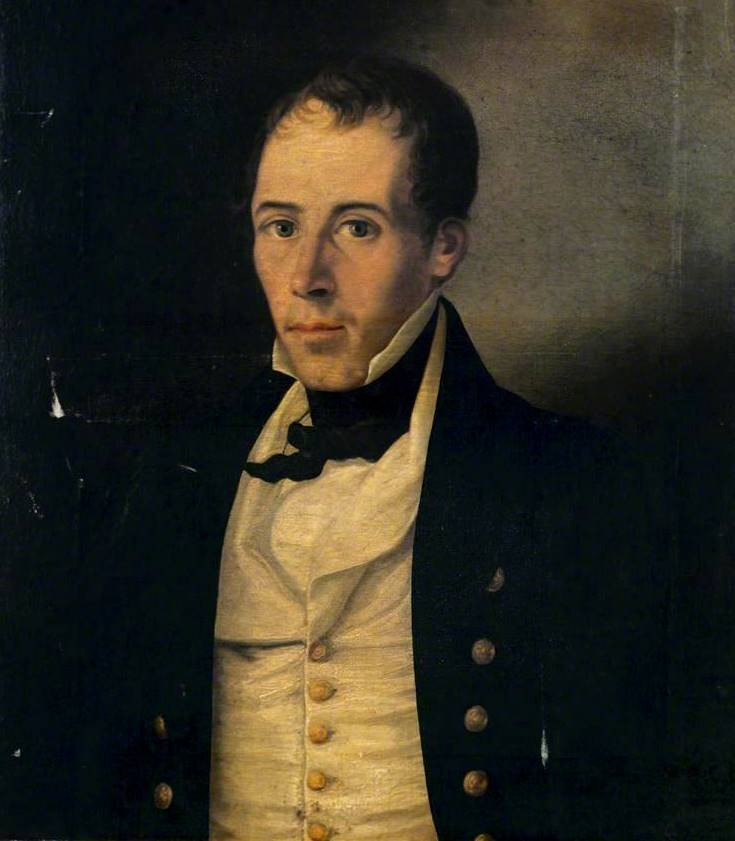
William Jameson by Antonio Salas, 1842

William ("Gulielmo") Jameson (1796–1873) was a Scottish-Ecuadorian botanist. He was born in Edinburgh and studied at the Royal College of Surgeons of Edinburgh. He made several voyages as a ship's surgeon, first to Baffin Bay, then to South America. In 1826 he settled in Quito, Ecuador. He was then appointed professor of chemistry and botany at Universidad Central del Ecuador. He went back to Edinburgh in 1869, returned to Quito in 1872, and died shortly thereafter.

Jameson made botanical investigations and collections in Greenland, Ecuador and in other South American countries. He began writing a flora of Ecuador, Synopsis Plantarum Aequatoriensium, of which Volumes 1 and 2 were published in 1865. The work was not completed.

Jameson is commemorated in the name of the Andean snipe (Gallinago jamesoni), and a species of Buddleja bush found in Ecuador, Buddleja jamesonii. As well as Jamesonia by Hook. & Grev. in the Pteridaceae family, first published in 1830, and Jamesoniella, which is a genus of liverworts in the family Adelanthaceae, published in 1881.
