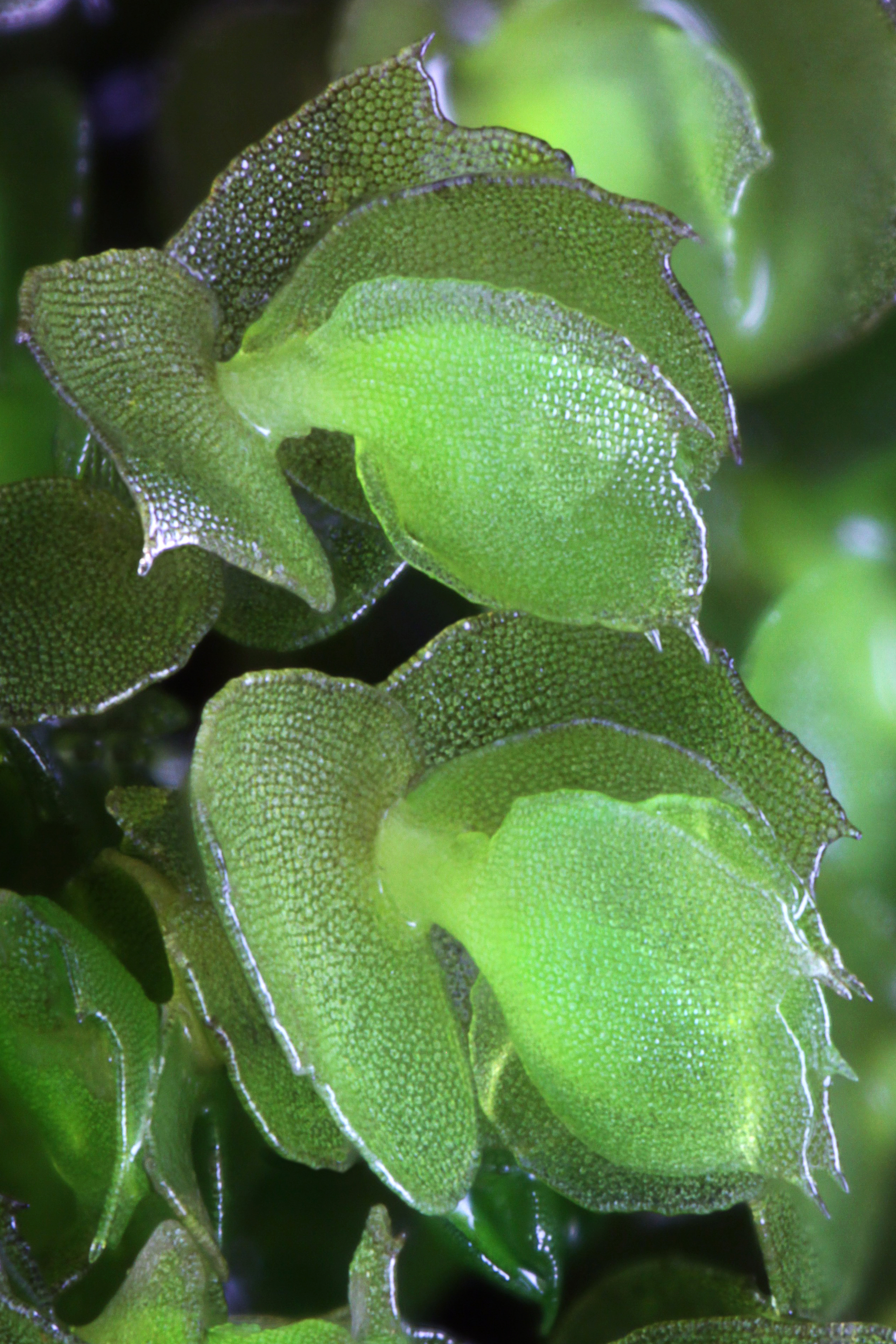
- Adelanthus decipiens

Scientific classification
- Kingdom: Plantae
- Division: Marchantiophyta
- Class: Jungermanniopsida
- Order: Lophoziales
- Family: Adelanthaceae; Grolle

= Adelanthaceae =

Family of liverworts

Adelanthaceae is a family of liverworts belonging to the order Jungermanniales.

Genera: (with how many species per genus)

- Adelanthus Mitt. – 11 spp.
- Cuspidatula Steph. – 7 spp.
- Denotarisia Grolle – 1 sp.
- Jamesoniella (Spruce) Carrington – genus no longer accepted
- Nothostrepta R.M.Schust. – 2 spp.
- Pisanoa Hässel – 1 sp.
- Protosyzygiella (Inoue) R.M.Schust. – 1 sp.
- Pseudomarsupidium Herzog – 5 spp.
- Syzygiella Spruce – 56 spp.
- Vanaea (Inoue & Gradst.) Inoue & Gradst. – 1 sp.
- Wettsteinia Schiffn. – 4 spp.
