= Tropical Andes =

Tropical subregion of the Andes Mountains

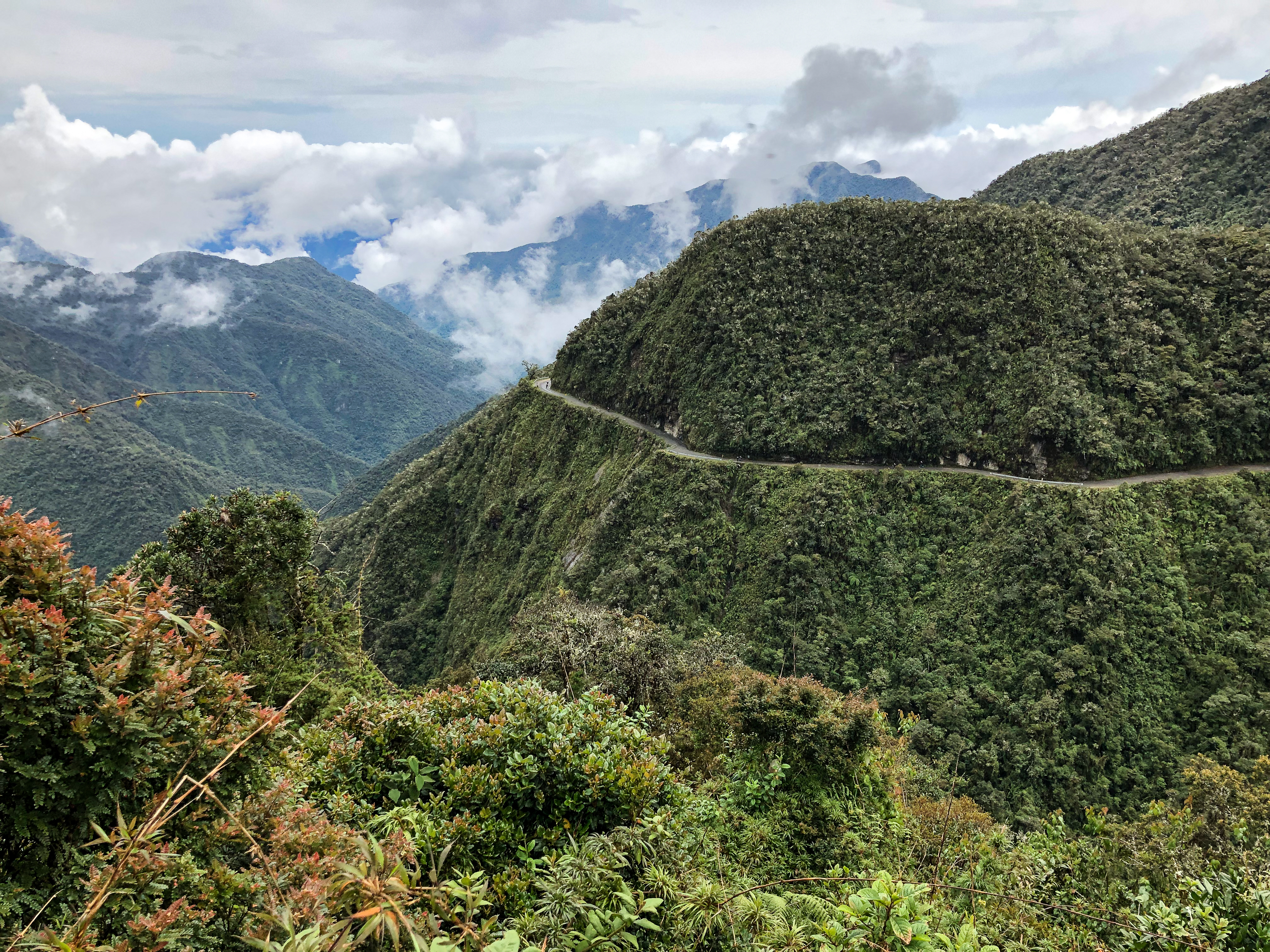
- Bolivian tropical Andean foothills, near the town of Coroico

Highest point
- Peak: Huascarán
- Elevation: 6,768 m (22,205 ft)

Dimensions
- Length: 3,300 km (2,100 mi)

Geography
- Countries: Venezuela, Colombia, Ecuador, Peru, Bolivia
- Parent range: Andes

The Tropical Andes is northern of the three climate-delineated parts of the Andes, the others being the Dry Andes and the Wet Andes. The Tropical Andes' area spans 1,542,644 km^{2} (595,618 sq mi).

== Geography and ecology ==
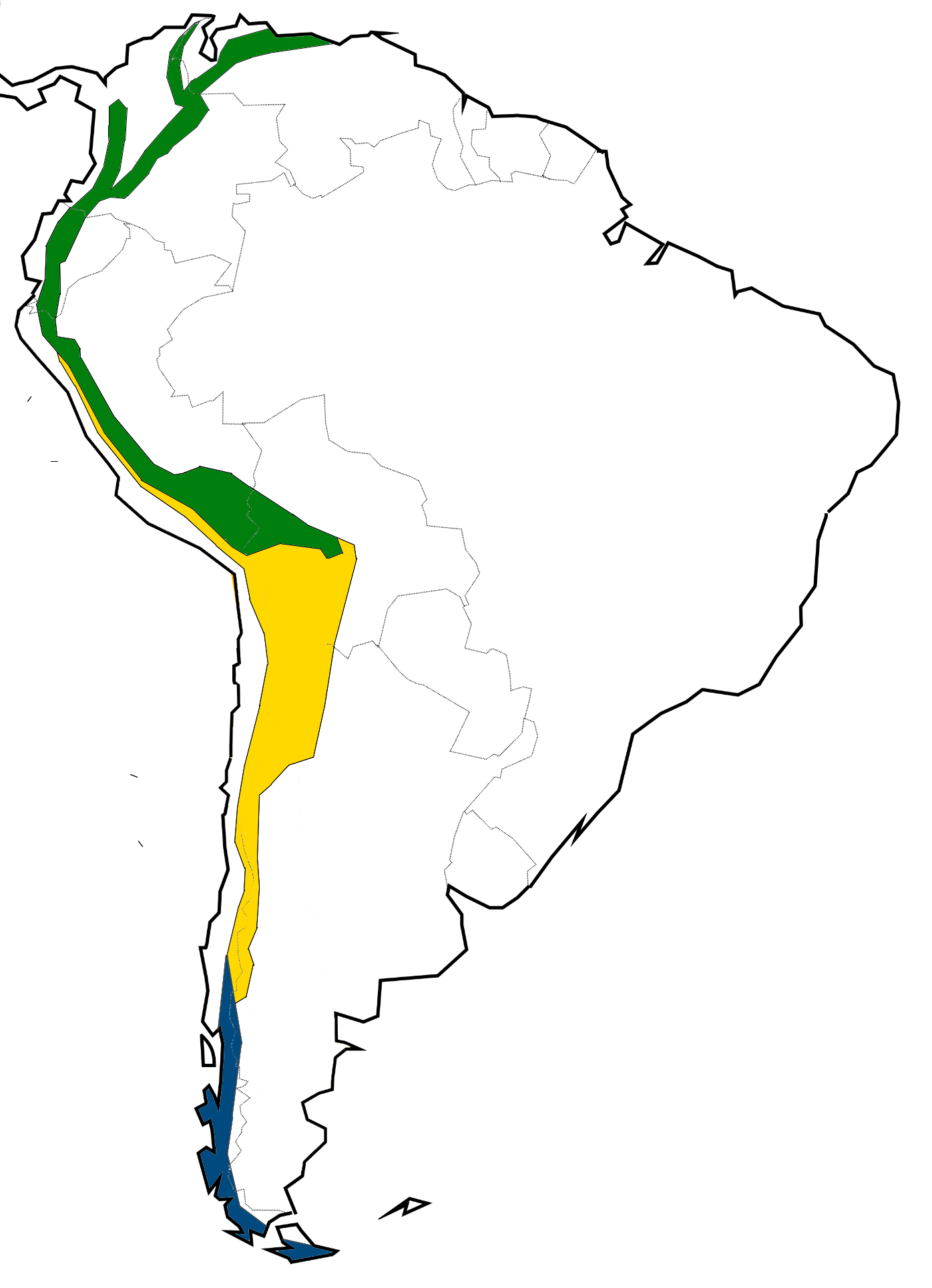
Map of the climatic regions of the Andes. The tropical Andes are shown in green. The Dry Andes are shown in yellow and the Wet Andes in dark blue.

The Tropical Andes are located in South America following the path of the Andes. They run, mainly, through five countries, Venezuela, Colombia, Ecuador, Peru, and Bolivia. The land initially was roughly 1,258,000 km^{2} (486,000 sq mi) but has decreased to 314,500 km^{2} (121,400 sq mi), leaving 25% of the original land. Due to the massive amount of area the landscape is diverse. Diverse landscapes lead to diverse habitats and the ability to provide needed resources for many species. The diverse landscape includes snow-topped mountains down to canyons and valleys. The different vegetation as elevation changes includes tropical rainforests at 500 to 1,500 meters (1,600–4,900 ft), cloud forests ranging from 800 to 3,500 meters (2,600–11,500 ft), and the highest elevations of 3,000 to 4,800 meters (9,800–15,700 ft) contain grasslands up to snow. The most diverse cloud forests found in Peru and Bolivia covers 500,000 km^{2} (190,000 sq mi). Dry forests and woodlands are also found throughout the Tropical Andes. The range is also home to the deepest gorge in Peru at 3,223 meters (10,574 ft) deep and Lake Titicaca, the highest navigable water with an elevation of 3,810 meters (12,500 ft).

== Biodiversity ==
The Tropical Andes are a biodiversity hotspot named the "global epicentre of biodiversity" according to the Critical Ecosystem Partnership Fund.

The Tropical Andes is an area of rich biodiversity. This location contains about 45,000 plant species of which 20,000 are endemic. There are over 3,000 vertebrate species with about 1,500 endemics. Besides plants and vertebrates, 1,666 bird species, 479 reptile species, and 830 amphibian species reside in the Tropical Andes. All hotspots are important for conservation biology, but especially the tropical Andes with so many endemic species. The biodiversity within the Tropical Andes is dwindling in numbers due to threats.

The diversity of vegetation at different elevations was further studied in Colombia. Chengyu Weng studied how pollen diversity is affected by different temperatures due to changing elevation. The team studied different vegetation, the subandean forest, Andean forest, subparamo, and grass paramo located in the Andes. There was more plant diversity as elevation increased throughout the vegetations. Pollen diversity positively correlated with more diversity at lower elevation. With these findings, they were able to see changes in plant diversity in the past 430000 years. During hot temperatures, pollen diversity increased at higher elevations, from plant species moving up. Cooler temperatures saw pollen diversity in lower elevations. The study explains how temperature influences plant diversity.

=== Ecoregions ===
The ecoregions in the hotspot include:

- Cordillera de la Costa montane forests (Venezuela)
- Venezuelan Andes montane forests (Venezuela)
- Cordillera Oriental montane forests (Colombia, Venezuela)
- Santa Marta páramo (Colombia)
- Santa Marta montane forests (Colombia)
- Northern Andean páramo (Colombia, Ecuador)
- Magdalena Valley montane forests (Colombia)
- Northwestern Andean montane forests (Colombia, Ecuador)
- Cauca Valley montane forests (Colombia)
- Cauca Valley dry forests (Colombia)
- Magdalena Valley dry forests (Colombia)
- Patía Valley dry forests (Colombia)
- Eastern Cordillera Real montane forests (Colombia, Ecuador, Peru)
- Marañón dry forests (Peru)
- Peruvian Yungas (Peru)
- Cordillera Central páramo (Peru)
- Central Andean wet puna (Bolivia, Peru)
- Central Andean puna (Bolivia, Peru)
- Bolivian Yungas (Bolivia, Peru)
- Bolivian montane dry forests (Bolivia)

== Hotspots ==
A hotspot can be identified as an area with great biological diversity with high endemism. The location must also have lost a significant amount of land and threatened species, according to the fourth edition of the Essentials of Conservation Biology. The term "hotspots" was used by Norman Myers written to describe ten tropical forests. The forests contained the characteristics of high levels of plant endemism and loss of habitats. Myers went on to add eight more hotspots by 1990. The Conservation International reassessed Myers definition of a hotspot and by 1999 criteria for a hotspot developed to be used globally. A hotspot needs 1,500 endemic vascular plant species and a loss of at least 30 percent of its original land. With these criteria, 25 hotspots were identified in 1999 and published in the journal Nature. They contained at least 44 percent of earth's endemics plants and 35 percent of land vertebrates. The combined area between the 25 hotspots used to cover 11.8 percent of land. The total amount of land has reduced from 17 million km^{2} to 2 million km^{2}, or about 85% of the land. This leaves this great biodiversity limited to about 1 percent of Earth's land surface.

== Research ==
There are a little over 30 hotspots now recorded and used for research. A few other hotspots include the Caribbean Islands, Himalaya, and Japan. Due to a hotspot's great diversity and endemic species, conservation biology and many other sources conduct research in these locations. Research is also needed considering the amount of threatened species in hotspots. Researchers have the opportunity to preserve many species along with their habitats within hotspots. Some organizations that use hotspots for research are World Conservation Monitoring Centre, Birdlife International, Conservation International, and World Wildlife Fund. Research is also done on humans' impact to the hotspots land and species that reside in them. Funding for hotspot conservation has been estimated at $750 million accumulated over the past fifteen years. By focusing research on hotspots, many species can be helped at once.

One specific research studies fire's impact on vegetation in Northern Ecuador of the Tropical Andes. This location's variety of vegetation includes different forests, land used for agricultural and páramo, or tropical alpine found at 4,500 meters. Páramo is dominated by grasses but still high in diversity. The article "Fire Ecology and Conservation in the High Tropical Andes: Observations from Northern Ecuador" looks at páramo's ability to withstand disturbances such as fire. Humans have lived in this location for 7,000 years, and the páramo has been through fires and grazing. The writer believes that policies used to implement fire suppression are not probable or beneficiary to the plant. Policies instead should be written up according to specific plant species and impact on natives living there. This is a small example of research in the Tropical Andes that could make a big impact to saving diversity.

Further research is also processed on looking into the decrease in avian populations, focusing in hotspots due to its massive diversity. The study focuses in Endemic Bird Areas or EBAs in order to understand why they become extinct and possible conservation plans. As of 2003 there were 218 EBAs, with over 30 percent of bird species threatened. EBAs located in hotspots interfere with many human activities, leading to habitat loss in 51 percent of EBAs. According to the article's chart, five EBAs with habitat loss are located in the Tropical Andes. By studying the effect of human activities on EBAs that are losing avian populations, plans to help the future of other EBAs are possible. Their results showed that if a species has habitat specificity and is large in size, the chance of extinction increases. Habitat loss will impact those with habitat specificity greatly. Conservation goals need to look into human activities and the bird's habitat specificity in order to make a positive impact.

An example of research on a specific threatened species in the Tropical Andes is the rare Tremarctos ornatus, also known as Andean (or spectacled) bears. Two males were captured, and radio collars were attached in order to track and study their habits and movement. They portrayed similar patterns compared to many other bear species. These findings contrasted with the belief of spectacled bears being nocturnal and no change in patterns between seasons because only slight change in temperature. The radio collars proved these spectacled bears to be diurnal. The bears were in motion from sunrise to sunset with periods of rest in between. There was a small change in level of activity between seasons, with an increase during the dry season. Due to the technology of radio collars, hypotheses about these bears were tested. By knowing their habitat and lifestyle, we can better understand and help threatened species.

== Rich diversity ==
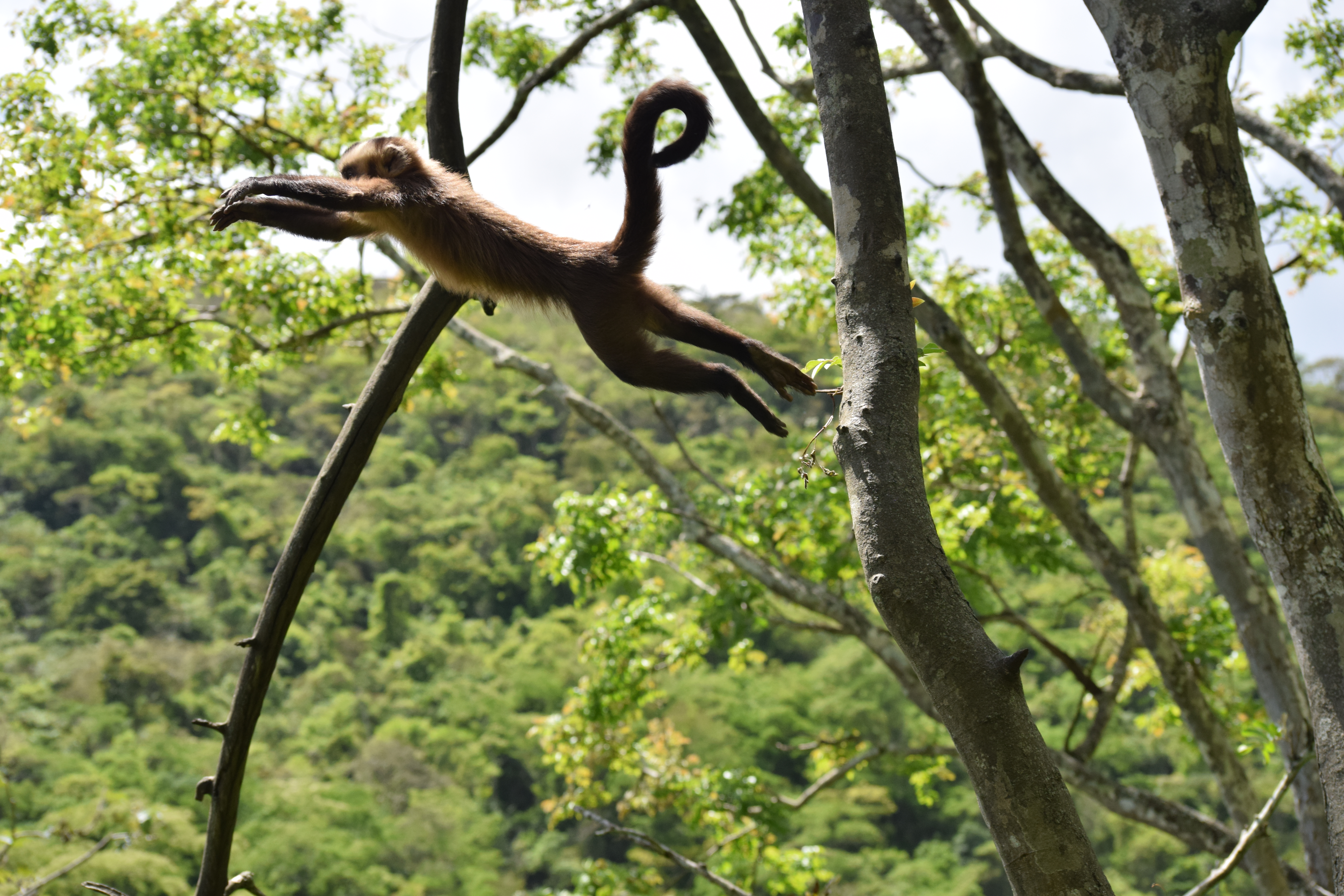
A capuchin monkey in the Bolivian yungas region

The Tropical Andes is said to be the most diverse of the world's scientific hotspots of diversity. The journal Nature contained an article by Norman Myers comparing the 25 hotspots with land and species in 2000. At the time, the Tropical Andes was recorded to have 45,000 plant species with the next closest hotspots recorded to have 25,000 plant species. In fact, a sixth of all plant species can be found in the Tropical Andes. The Tropical Andes also has the most endemic plant species at 20,000, while the next hotspot contains 15,000. The Tropical Andes has a lot of land compared to other hotspots but is not the largest.

Many endemic plant and animal species are currently threatened in the Tropical Andes. An example of a threatened plant species is the Andean bromelilad, an endemic plant that takes up to 100 years to mature and a common diet for species that forage. Other plant species include many crops such as tobacco and potatoes. One endemic animal is the Andean condor, which almost became extinct from hunting. Thanks to a conservation reintroduction program, their numbers are growing. Another threatened endemic bird in the Tropical Andes is the yellow-eared parrot. One threat this species faces is the loss of the vulnerable wax palm. The yellow-eared parrot uses the wax palm for nesting and roosting. However, humans, especially in Colombia, are removing the vulnerable wax palm from the wild for Palm Sunday. Some conservation programs are helping the situation to educate churches to use other resources besides the vulnerable wax palm. The yellow-tailed monkey is another endemic animal that is endangered. They are one of the rarest mammals, with a recorded population of 250 found in the cloud forests of Peru. They are threatened by humans causing habitat loss and fragmentation of their habitat. Their slow maturity and low population densities do not help. Programs have tried to relocate them to secondary forests, but attempts have failed. Many species reside in the Tropical Andes but are threatened severely.

== Habitat degradation threats ==
There are many threats that the Tropical Andes faces every day. One of the main threats is human activities, especially with increasing population. Some activities include mining, logging, and construction. Humans also use land for agriculture and keep relocating once the land is used up. Valleys are severely degraded due to humans living there. Hydroelectric dams have also been put in the Tropical Andes and negatively pressured cloud forests. The 25 percent of land that is protected is still poorly managed with little help from the public from lack of education. Invasive species have also been a threat to the Tropical Andes' land and species, possibly brought in by humans. Invasive species include the American bullfrog and certain grasses used for cattle.

Humans have the ability to cause habitat loss and habitat fragmentation for species. The forest habitats that are threatened in the Tropical Andes are modified and destroyed 30 percent faster than lower tropical areas. Fragmentation causes a separation within species and decreases the diversity of genes. There is the possibility of inbreeding to increase as well. An article also looked at fragmentation causing certain phenotypes to arise in organisms. By studying feathers of 2,500 individual bird species within nine forests, observation showed asymmetry linked with fragmentation. Asymmetry was lowest if the forest continued and highest with small or medium fragmentation. They suggest asymmetry of bird feathers influenced by the stress of fragmentation and changing environments. That is one outcome from fragmentation in the Tropical Andes.

A study by Niall O'Dea looks at bird communities in general and how habitat degradation impacts them. He compared the bird communities that reside in primary forests, secondary forests, edge habitat and agricultural land, all modified by humans. Most diversity was found in secondary forests and edge habitats but different species. The agricultural land and primary forest held the lowest diversity. This study suggests that within Andean montane forests, preserving secondary forests offers most benefit for these threatened birds.

Another serious threat to the Tropical Andes is global warming, the effect of too much of greenhouse gasses trapped in the air that hold in heat. Some locations are increasing in temperature and others decreasing. The change in temperatures has a major effect on the Tropical Andes; some say that this is more negative than deforestation. One serious issue is the melting of the glaciers in the mountains. It is estimated that 80 percent of freshwater comes from mountains and with them melting about half of the Earth's population will be affected. All over the world glaciers are melting, but the mountains in the Tropical Andes are very susceptible. It is said that a quarter of the Tropical Andes glacier has already begun retreating. These glaciers make up many species water supply, and the location could be in crisis if they melt away. Glaciers in the Andes provide two main functions; decrease seasonal discharge variability and provide greater specific discharge. The article by Bryan Mark predicts an increase in discharge as glaciers melt, with the ability to trace glacier water melting into watersheds using isotopes. Global warming can lead to the extinction of many species, especially in hotspots. A study done by Jay Malcolm predicts that less than 1 percent up to 43 percent of endemic biota will become extinct due to global warming. He also believes the Tropical Andes is in the top six vulnerable hotspots, with the possibility of plant extinction exceeding 2000 species.

Global warming is also causing an increase in diseases among amphibians. Considering that the Tropical Andes is recorded to have the most amphibians, some restricted to this location, diseases could decrease the diversity greatly. Another factor is that 400 of the amphibian species are already threatened. These deadly fungi have actually been linked to the extinction of dinosaurs. One chytrid fungus that is infecting amphibians is the batrachochytrium dendrobatidis. This fungus will impair the amphibian's skin and reduce its ability to absorb. One example of an amphibian in the Tropical Andes is the genus Atelopus, with 56 of the species Critically Endangered. Due to increase in temperature, the fungus has the ability to spread rapidly and thrive on living amphibians.

A new threat that is being researched is the effect from nitrogen deposition. Studies done in Europe have shown diversity among plants decreased due to nitrogen deposition. Current models are estimating what could happen to hotspots across the world if nitrogen deposition keeps increasing. By comparing to past research, nitrogen deposition has already increased 50 percent since the 1990s. The estimation for the future shows an increase by 100 percent in 2050. Considering the great plant diversity in the Tropical Andes, especially so many endemics, nitrogen deposition could be a severe threat. The decrease in plant diversity could cause a chain reaction on other species that depend on the plants.

These are just few threats the Tropical Andes faces on a daily basis. The impact on the land is shown by a 75 percent decrease from its original mass. Species affected are decreasing in numbers, and the number of species listed on the Endangered Species Act is increasing. The situation is worse when threatened species are endemic to the Tropical Andes. 14 endemic mammals and 110 endemic birds are threatened in the Tropical Andes. Two species from the Tropical Andes have already become extinct.
