= Toni Egger =

Austrian mountain climber (1926-1959) who died on Cerro Torre, Argentina

- Born: 12 September 1926; Bolzano
- Died: 2 February 1959 (aged 32); Cerro Torre, Argentina
- Occupation: Mountain Guide
- Known for: First ascent of Jirishanca, death on Cerro Torre

Toni Egger (12 September 1926 - 2 February 1959) was a prominent Austrian rock-climber and mountaineer, "one of the best climbers of his time", who made the first ascent of Jirishanca and many significant ascents in the Dolomites, the western Alps, Turkey, and Peru. He died whilst descending from the summit of Cerro Torre.

== Early years ==
Egger was born in the town of Bolzano in the South Tyrol on 12 September 1926. His father was a timber merchant from Mölten, c. 20 km north-west of Bolzano and his mother was from the settlement of Siebeneich in the Terlan area, a little closer to Bolzano. The family included Toni, 2 elder brothers and a younger sister, his parents and their predecessors had lived in the South Tyrol when it was part of the Austro-Hungarian Empire, before the Treaty of Saint-Germain-en-Laye led to its annexation to Italy in 1919.

In 1939, after Mussolini and Hitler had signed the 1938 South Tyrolean resettlement agreement, the Egger family moved to the Austrian East Tyrol where they settled in the village of Nußdorf-Debant just outside Lienz. Soon after the start of the Second World War Egger's eldest brother Franz was called up, Toni received his call up papers on the day that the news of his brother's death in the Battle of Monte Cassino reached the family, he served for a year in France, mainly at an airbase in the Ardennes before returning to Lienz.

== The European Alps ==
Egger started climbing in 1941, in the Lienz Dolomites, often solo. It wasn't until 1950 that his interest took him further afield; in that year he made his way to the Tre Cime di Lavaredo, travelling the 70 km from his home town on foot, following smugglers routes through the forests, because he didn't have a passport. That first visit inspired him to return to attempt some of the more serious climbs and it was only three months later that he and Franz Rienzer climbed the Comici route on the north face of the Cima Grande, one of the "Great north faces of the Alps" and the line that Gaston Rebuffat had followed in 1948 when he became the first climber to have ascended all six of the north faces.

Egger was soon making ascents of other routes in the eastern Dolomites which at the time were considered amongst the most difficult of the day. In the 1950s he also began to pioneer new routes, both close to his home in the Gailtal Alps and in the Dolomites nearby.

He was known for his fast ascents and he made several significant ascents solo. Among the highlights was his 4.5hr ascent, with Franco Mantelli, of the 1,100m high Solleder route on the NW wall of the Civetta in 1952. In 1954 he and Mayr Gottfried made an ascent of the north face of Cima Ovest followed by the north face of Cima Grande in a total time of only 11 hours, 10 hours would have been a typical time to ascend just the Cima Grande north face. He capped this in 1956 by his solo ascent of the Cima Grande north face in only 4 hours. He also made a fast solo ascent of the Cima Piccola via the Spigollo Giallo (The Yellow Edge), in 1970 Walter Pause wrote about the "Alpine supermen who have climbed it in 1½ hrs or less", Egger climbed the route in 75 minutes.

He also completed many of the most difficult ascents of the day in the Western Alps. His visit to the Mont Blanc massif in the summer of 1956 included some which were particularly noteworthy:

- the Bonatti Pillar on the Aiguille du Dru climbing with Herbert Raditschnig and H. G. Karwendler, they only spent one night on the face and this was only the third time that the climb had been repeated since Bonatti had made the first ascent in August 1955. The Pillar was then graded ED+ and considered "the hardest rock climb in the French Alps".
- the south face of the Aiguille du Midi, Egger was unaware that Rebuffat had made the first ascent just two days earlier.
- solo ascents of the south ridge of the Aiguille Noire de Peuterey and the south-east pillar of the Dent du Géant

Egger became a member of the climbing group “Alpine Gesellschaft Alpenraute” from Lienz and in 1951 he qualified as a mountain guide. He later became the Director of the Hochgebirgsschule Tirol in Innsbruck (the Tirol Alpine school), a position he held from 1954 to 1957.

== Further afield ==
In 1956 he participated in an expedition to the Kaçkar Mountains in north-east Turkey led by Hermann Köllensperger (who had been a member of the 1953 Nanga Parbat expedition when Hermann Buhl made the first ascent of that mountain).

Later, in 1957, he was a member of a team from the Austrian Alpine Club, led by Heinrich Klier, which travelled to the Cordillera Huayhuash in the Peruvian Andes. The group also included Siegfried Jungmair, Erich Krenmayr and Herbert Raditschnig, their primary objective was the first ascent of Jirishanca 6,127 m (20,102 ft), the last unclimbed 6000m peak in the Cordillera Huayhuash. Egger and Jungmair reached the snow ridge leading to the summit of Jirishanca in late June but snow conditions were so bad that they were unable to continue to the top. After that failure the team decided to attempt other peaks in the area: Egger and Jungmair made the first ascent of El Toro 6,121 m (20,082 ft) via a ramp line on the east face of the mountain, while Krenmayr and Raditschnig attempted Nevado Carnicero 5,980 m (19,620 ft) but they only reached a high point of 5,700 m (18,700 ft). In the hope that snow conditions might have improved the team then decided to make a second attempt on Jirishanca. Starting on 10 July Egger and Jungmair climbed by the east buttress and reached the summit on 12 July 1957, in one continuous push. That ascent has been hailed as "one of the most difficult ascents in the Andes at the time" and "one of the boldest climbing feats ever performed in the Cordillera". Riccardo Cassin described their successful ascent as "one of the most outstanding achievements of valour, courage and endurance". Fifty years after the ascent it was written that their climb "was one of the greatest ever exploits in world mountaineering and remains unequalled in the history of Andean climbing. Even today their climb is still graded ED". It was more than 25 years before a second party successfully climbed Jirishanca from the east.

The group moved on to make a number of first ascents in the Cordillera Raura.

== Egger's death on Cerro Torre ==
Towards the end of 1958 Egger returned to South America for what would turn out to be his final expedition. The team comprised Cesare Maestri and Cesarino Fava in addition to Egger. On this occasion the target was the first ascent of Cerro Torre 3,128 m (10,262 ft).

Egger had first met Maestri at the Lavaredohütte in the Tre Cime in 1956, but the first time that they climbed together was on Cerro Torre. They attempted a route which started up the mountain's east face. From 5 January 1959, Egger, Maestri and Fava spent 10 days climbing towards the north col, which lies between Cerro Torre and Torre Egger. They had climbed about 300 m (reaching an altitude of 2,350 m (7,710 ft)) when bad weather forced them to descend. After 10 days of storm the weather improved, and on 28 January they returned to the climb. Initially, Fava climbed with Egger and Maestri, but he did so only to help carry equipment and he soon descended to the base. Fava spent six days waiting for the return of the other two climbers and was on the point of leaving to summon help when he saw a dark shape on the snow near the foot of the route. He found Maestri lying face down, semi-conscious and almost buried in the snow. Maestri told Fava that he and Egger had reached the summit and that Egger had been swept to his death by an avalanche while they were descending. Maestri's account was that after reaching the summit with Egger, snow and ice were avalanching down their descent route. They reached a point where he was too tired to continue, but Egger was reluctant to make a bivouac there because they were close to their fixed ropes which would have protected the rest of the descent. As Maestri was lowering Egger down to the fixed ropes, an avalanche fell and cut the rope between the two climbers and swept Egger down into the abyss, taking with him their only camera and much of the gear.

When Maestri returned to Italy, he was hailed as a hero and was awarded a medal for bravery. Lionel Terray, a veteran of South American and Himalayan expeditions, told the world that Maestri and Egger had performed 'the greatest climbing feat of all time'. It wasn't long before doubts about Maestri’s account arose. There appeared to be many inconsistencies and unanswered questions. As other climbers visited Cerro Torre, they found clear evidence of Maestri and Egger's progress on the lower sections of the route but nothing at or above the north col, and many questioned whether the pair actually reached the summit.

== Aftermath ==
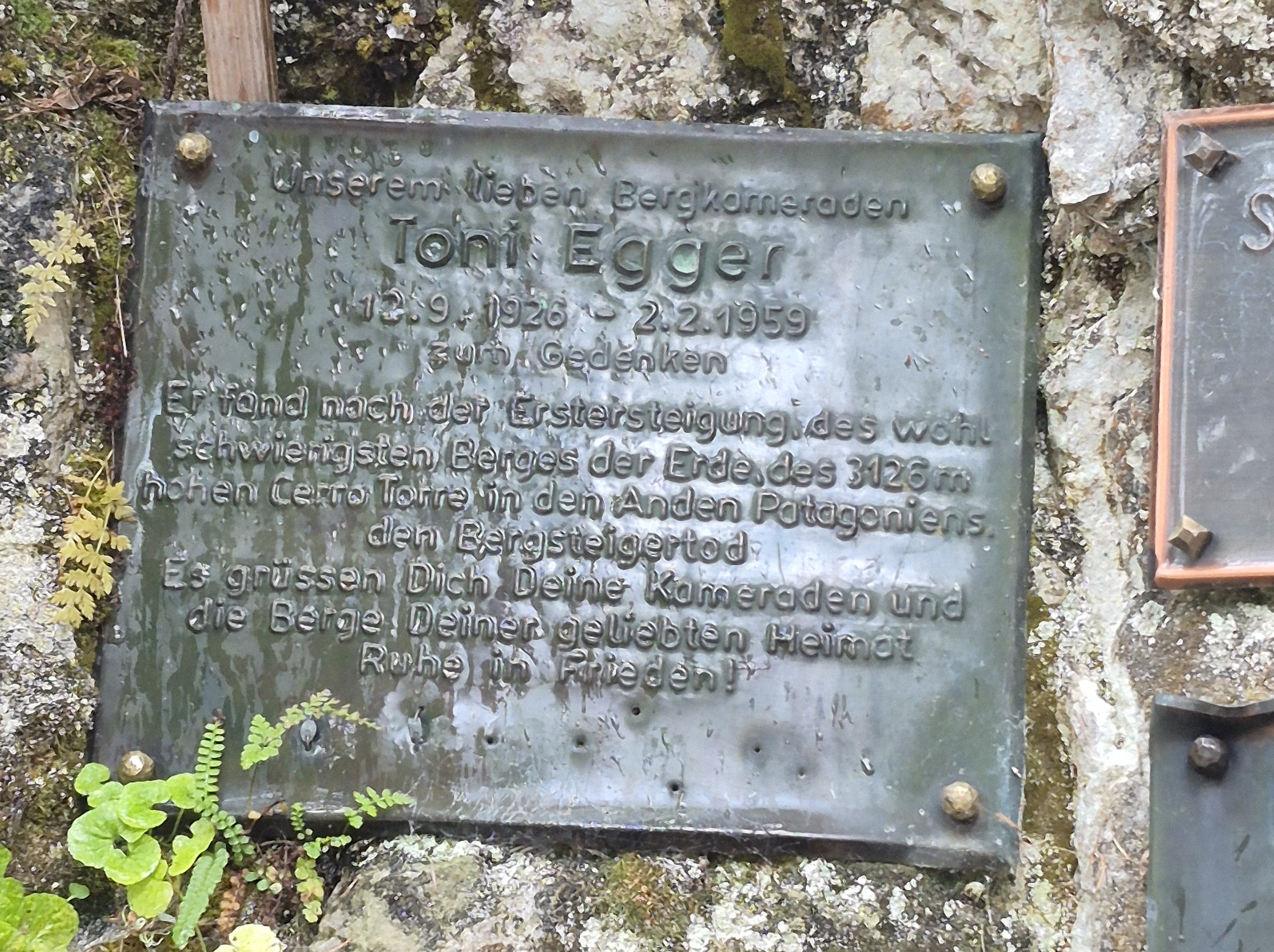
Memorial to Toni Egger (1926-1959) - Insteinhutte, Lienzer Dolomit

In early 1961 Fava returned to Cerro Torre. He hoped to recover Egger’s body. Although he found nothing, he placed a commemorative plaque near the base of the mountain's east face. Lionel Terray described Cerro Torre as "the most beautiful and luminous crypt in the world, the one that protects the unforgettable Toni Egger". A more prosaic memorial plaque was erected in the Lienz Dolomites, close to the Insteinhütte on the approach path between Egger's home town of Lienz and the Karlsbader Hütte which sits below the Roter Turm, the rock wall on which Egger made some of his early first ascents.

Late in 1974 the UK climber Mick Coffey, along with the American climbers John Bragg and Jim Donini were attempting Cerro Standhardt; on Christmas Day they were descending the glacier a couple of kilometers downstream from the base of Cerro Torre when they discovered some of Eggers’s remains. Further search uncovered a rope, ice-axe, a hammer and more human remains. His remains were buried at the foot of the west wall of Fitz Roy. In early 2003 more of Egger’s remains were found not far from the 1975 location. Egger’s camera has never been found.

Egger was regarded as "one of the best climbers of his time" and "one of the leading alpinists of his generation". A tower, the Eggerturm, on the Seekofel in the Lienz Dolomites today bears Toni Egger's name. The Patagonian mountain Torre Egger (2,685 m (8,809 ft)), which sits between Cerro Torre and Cerro Standhardt, was named after him. It was Cesare Maestri who, in 1961, first proposed the name Torre Egger.

== Notable first ascents in the European Alps ==
- the north wall of the Roter Turm in the Gailtal Alps (11 Sept 1950)
- the north wall of the Kellerturm in the Carnic Alps (1951)
- the south wall of the Laserzwand in the Gailtal Alps (30 Aug 1953)
- the north wall of the Laserzwand in the Gailtal Alps (1954)
- the south wall of the Cima Piccola in the Sexten Dolomites (14 July 1955)
- the north wall of the Hochstadel in the Gailtal Alps with Peter Pfauder (6 January 1956)
- the south-west pillar of the Cime di Ombretta in the Marmolada Dolomites with Cesare Giudici (18 August 1956)
- the south-east pillar of the Patteriol in the Verwall Alps (1958)
- south-west ridge of the Cima Bois, in the Tofane district of the Ampezzo Dolomites (1958)
