= Brette Harrington =

American rock climber and alpinist (born 1992)

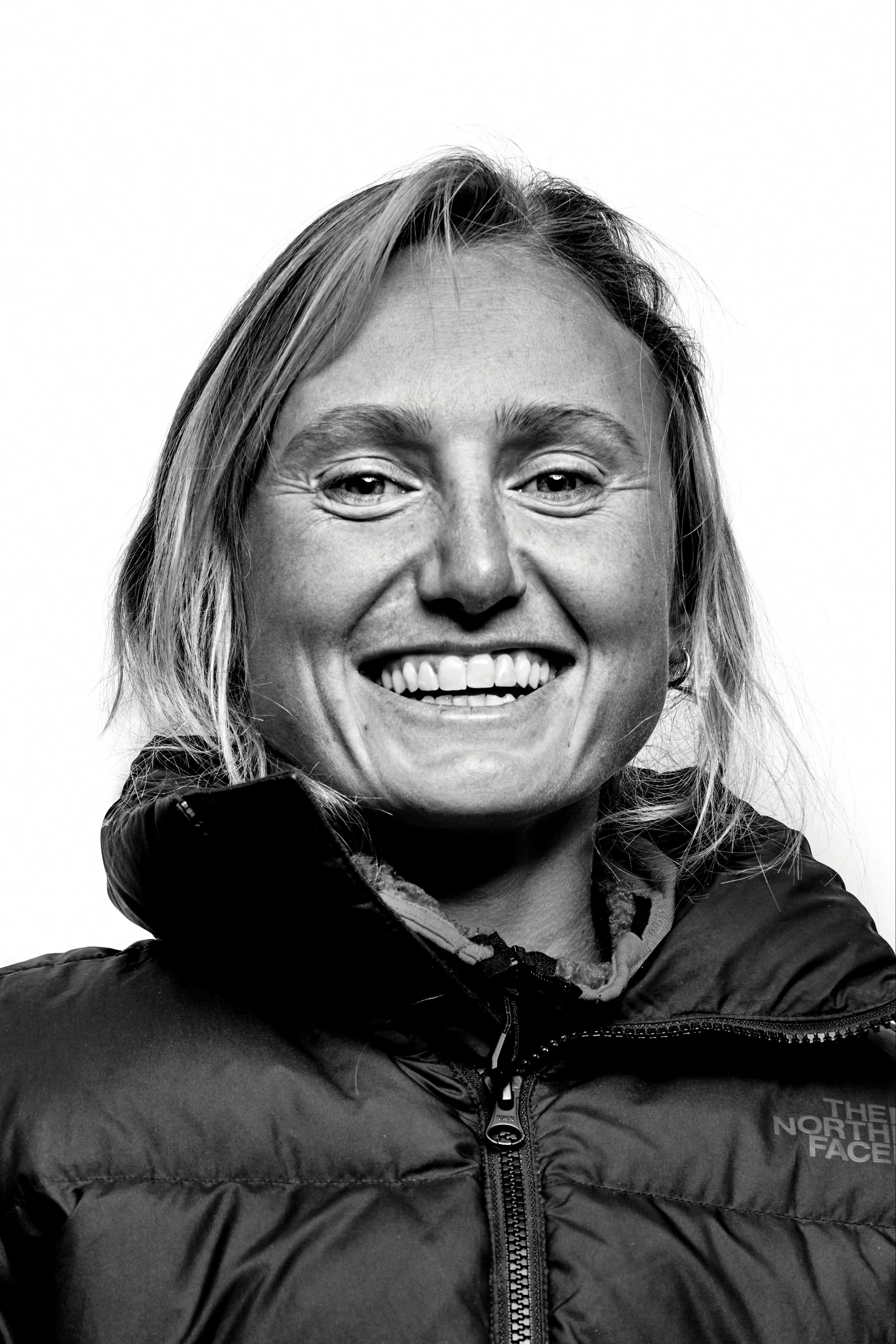

Personal information
- Nationality: American
- Born: Lake Tahoe, California
- Education: The University of British Columbia (BA, Spanish Language and Literature, 2015)
- Occupation: Rock climber

Climbing career
- Type of climber: Traditional climbing; Big wall climbing; Free solo climbing; Alpine climbing
- Highest grade: Redpoint: 5.14a (8b+); Free solo: 5.11a (6b+)

Brette Harrington (born 1992) is an American professional rock climber and alpinist based in Lake Tahoe, California, and British Columbia, Canada. She was featured in the 2021 film The Alpinist alongside her late partner, Marc-André Leclerc. She is best known for the first free solo of the 760 meter (2,500-foot) Chiaro di Luna (5.11a) in Patagonia, for her development of new alpine climbing routes, and as the star of Brette, a Reel Rock Film Tour short film.

== Early life ==
Harrington, the daughter of two skiers, grew up in Tahoe, California, on Lake Tahoe. At two years old, she began learning to ski and competed in slalom racing from the age of five, which she would continue for another decade. At sixteen, seeking greater challenge, Harrington switched to slopestyle skiing, adding "another layer of mountain experience". Following her move to attend a boarding school near New Hampshire's White Mountains, the Holderness School, Harrington's curiosity led her to join the school's rock climbing club, where

the proximity to Rumney, [and] Cathedral Ledge, and White Horse Ledge provided her access to sport, trad[itional], and multi-pitch [climbing] routes.

The club did not compete in climbing competitions—at the time Harrington was unaware that such competitions existed—and she noted that her team members all found climbing "intrinsically special," with the engagement, for her, being something "very personal".

Harrington moved to Vancouver, Canada, to attend the University of British Columbia (UBC), to study Spanish, continue her skiing, and with a view toward further climbing among "the great peaks of Canada". With Squamish, British Columbia located north of UBC by a drive on the order of an hour, this area became her "granite training gound", with its "Chief" and its "signature bouldery cruxes" a source of technical, traditional climbs. While her profile in Climbing Magazine from 2016 leaves unstated how her college years came to an end, it makes clear that for reasons of injury—"including a broken neck and multiple concussions"—her slopestyle skiing had come to an end by age 20, it being replaced by her climbing and backcountry explorations via ski touring.

== Climbing career ==
Harrington is an accomplished traditional climber, and sport climber with completed routes including Grand Illusion 5.13c (8a+) on Sugarloaf in Lake Tahoe, and The Free Muir 5.13c (8a+) on El Capitan in Yosemite, California. and Shadow Line (14a) in Sardinia, Italy. She is known for her multi-pitch climbing and big wall climbing, and her ability to develop new lines.

=== Notable first ascents ===
Starting around 2013, Harrington and partner Marc-André Leclerc began exploring and putting up first free ascents in the mountains of western Canada. “Climbing around our home [in British Columbia], a lot of things haven’t been done yet,” Harrington noted. In 2014, she and Leclerc made the first ascent of Straight No Chaser, a 1500m route (5.11/A1) in the Waddington Range of Canada. In 2016, Harrington, Leclerc and Josh Lavigne made the first ascent of the Northwest Turret (5.13a, A2) on Great Sail Peak of Baffin Island, Canada.

With fellow mountaineer Rose Pearson, Harrington established a new long alpine route, dubbed Life Compass, up the west face of Mount Blane in Canada's Rocky Mountains in May 2018. The new route was hailed as "one of the few climbs of this size and grade ever established in the Canadian Rockies by an all-women team."

In early April 2019, Harrington, Ines Papert and Luka Lindič made the first ascent of a new route, The Sound of Silence on the East Face of Mt. Fay in the Rockies of Alberta, Canada. The 1100 m route was completed in a fast and light style with one night spent 75 m (250 ft) below the summit.

=== Other notable climbs ===
Harrington gained recognition when, in February 2015, she free-soloed Chiaro di Luna (5.11a, 750m) on Aguja Saint Exupery, Patagonia. Although the route had been climbed before by Alexander Huber in 2011, she was the first climber, male or female, to do so without the aid of any equipment or protection. The climb was ranked as one of the ten most legendary free solos to date. Fellow free soloist, Austin Howell wrote of the climb, "This is hands down one of the coolest free solos ever, and is notable because it's one of the few free solos that have been done on big mountains in Patagonia."

In 2017, Harrington made a failed attempt at Riders on the Storm, on Torre Central del Paine, Patagonia. She and her climbing partner Mayan Smith-Gobat were able to work on some of the critical crux pitches, but were turned back from the summit by bad weather. "We were forced to use every technique we knew to get through the ice-covered and often run out climbing. Our goal then changed to just making it through the first half of 'Riders on the Storm' in any style possible."

== Awards and press ==
According to Gripped Magazine in 2016, Harrington was "one of the world’s leading crack and alpine climbers". She was noted for her ability to maintain physical and emotional control while undertaking challenging routes, and has gained fans for being a "bright firecracker who carries her joy on her face" and someone whose climbing soul "burns bright."

Harrington was the subject of a Reel Rock Film Tour short film, Brette in 2016. Film-maker Nick Rosen of Reel Rock noted that he found the subject compelling as a story of a huge talent just emerging, "What's special here is that we captured the first year of full-time climbing of a woman who is probably going to be a legend. She's on the trajectory of being the Steph Davis of her generation."

In 2017, she was named one of the top women in sports to watch by Forbes Magazine.

Two of Harrington's 2018 routes were included as significant ascents that year by representatives for the Piolets d'Or prize, indicating possible contention for the prestigious award. These were Devil's Paw, completed with Gabe Hayden, in Alaska, and Mount Blane, in the Canadian Rockies, completed with Rose Pearson.

In 2021, Harrington was featured in the film The Alpinist, a documentary following the climbing career of Leclerc prior to his death. Filming was completed prior to the accident, but Harrington agreed to participate in some additional filming to talk about Leclerc over a year after his death that was included in the final cut.

== Personal life ==
Harrington's long-time partner, fellow alpinist Marc-André Leclerc, was confirmed dead after going missing during a climbing expedition near Juneau, Alaska, in March 2018. Following Leclerc's death, Harrington devoted two years to working on alpine routes. She spent the first year processing Leclerc's death while she "was deep in the mountains". Harrington dedicated her May 2018 Mount Blane route to Leclerc, writing: "We have named it Life Compass for a number of reasons. Primarily because my life has taken such a sudden 180-degree turn since the loss of Marc in March and alpine climbing has been my guide. I dedicate this climb to my climbing mentor, partner, and love Marc-Andre who would probably solo it the following day ;) if he was here." Harrington's 2019 first ascent of The Sound of Silence, completed with Luka Lindič, a former climbing partner of Leclerc and Ines Papert, was named in memory of Leclerc, who had previously been working on the route.

Brette Harrington is not related to climber Emily Harrington. She is a graduate of the University of British Columbia.

== Selected notable climbs ==
- 2014, Straight No Chaser (5.11/A1), Waddington Range, Canada – First ascent with Marc-André Leclerc.
- 2015, Chiaro de Luna (5.11a), Saint Exupery, Patagonia – first free solo.
- 2015, Grand Illusion (5.13b/c), Sugarloaf, California – Second female ascent.
- 2015, Muir Wall (5.13c), Yosemite, California.
- 2016, Coconut Connection (5.12), Great Sail Peak, Baffin Island, Nunavut, Canada – First free ascent.
- 2016, Northwest Turret (5.13a, 22 pitches), Great Sail Peak, Baffin Island, Nunavut, Canada – Established route with Joshua Lavigne and Marc-André Leclerc.
- 2016, Hidden Dragon (5.12b/c), Chinese Puzzle Wall, Nesakwatch River Valley, British Columbia, Canada – Established route with Marc-André Leclerc. First free ascent.
- 2017, Aurorophobia (5.13+), Wiaparous River Valley, Alberta, Canada – Established route with Marc-André Leclerc, First Ascent.
- 2018, Life Compass, Mount Blane, British Columbia – Established route with Rose Pearson. First ascent.
- 2019, The Sound of Silence, Mt Fay, Alberta, Canada – First ascent, with Ines Papert and Luka Lindic.
- 2019, MA's Vision (5.12c, 900m), Torre Egger, Patagonia – First free ascent, with Quentin Roberts.
- 2020, Hammer and the Dance (11c, 750m) Mount Neptuak, Moraine Lake, Alberta, Canada — First ascent with Tony Mclane.
- 2021, Mt. Niblock, northeast face, Banff National Park – Established route with Dylan Cunningham. First ascent.
- 2021, El Corazon (5.13b), El Capitan, Yosemite, California – with Elliott Bernhagen.
- 2022, Polar Moon Ski Decent (1200m, 45 degrees) Walker Arm, Baffin Island, Nunavut, Canada — First ski decent with Christina Lustenberger.
- 2025, Shadow Line (14a), Grotta di Salinas, Sardinia, Italy — Establiahed route with Elliott Bernhagen. First ascent
- 2026, North Glacier of Mount Deltaform (700m, 50 degrees) Moraine Lake, Alberta, Canada — First ski decent with Christina Lustenberger and Gee Pierrel

== Filmography ==
- Reel Rock S3 E4: Brette (2016)
- A Thousand Ways to Kiss the Ground (2020)
- The Alpinist (2021)
- Reel Rock S8 E1: Rayu (2022)
- Earthside (2023)
- Reel Rock S10 E6: The Puzzle (2024)

== See also ==
- Beth Rodden, leading American traditional rock climber
- Catherine Destivelle, French alpinist
