= Zuccone Campelli =

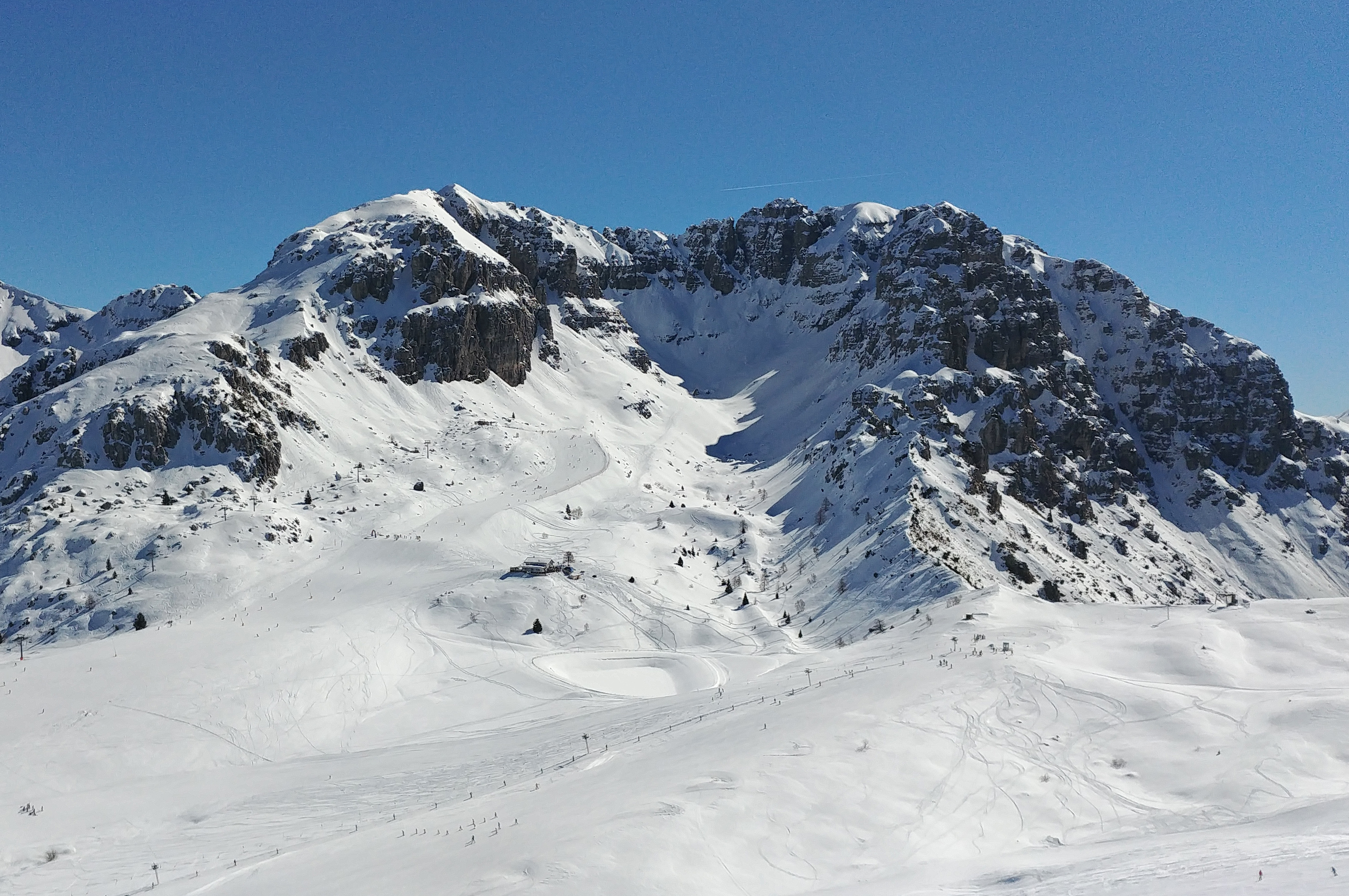
- The Campelli massif in winter, with Zucco Barbisino (left), Zuccone Campelli (center) and Zucco Pesciola (right)

Highest point
- Elevation: 2,161 m (7,090 ft)
- Prominence: 510 m (1,670 ft)
- Coordinates: 45°57′16″N 9°31′01.08″E

Geography
- Location within Alps
- Location: Lombardy, Italy
- Parent range: Bergamasque Prealps

Zuccone Campelli is a mountain of Lombardy, Italy, with an elevation of 2,161 metres (7,090 ft). It is located in the Bergamasque Prealps, in the Province of Lecco, overlooking the Valsassina.

Zuccone Campelli is the highest peak of the Campelli massif, which lies on the northern side of the ski resort of the Piani di Bobbio, near the border with the Province of Bergamo. The massif also includes the Zucco Barbesino (2,152 m) and Zucco Pesciola (2,092 m), to the north and west of Zuccone Campelli, respectively. Its rugged western face is renowned among local mountaineers and has been climbed by climbers such as Emilio Comici, Riccardo Cassin and Vitale Bramani.

The peak can be reached through hiking paths starting from the Piani di Bobbio (western side) or from the easier eastern side. There is a via ferrata, named after Mario Minonzio.
