= Peter Mortimer (filmmaker) =

American filmmaker from Colorado (born 1974)

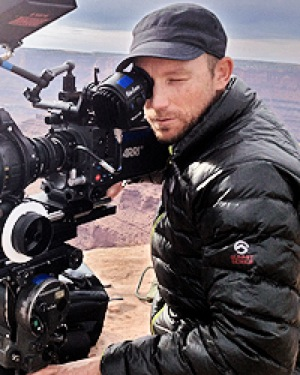
- Born: January 28, 1974 (age 52); Philadelphia, Pennsylvania, U.S.
- Citizenship: United States
- Education: MFA in film
- Alma mater: University of Southern California
- Occupation: Filmmaker
- Awards: Sports Emmy, News and Documentary Emmy Nomination: Outstanding Graphic Design & Art Direction

Peter Mortimer (born January 28, 1974) is an Emmy-winning American filmmaker from Colorado. He is best known as the director of the HBO documentary-series The Dark Wizard, as well as feature documentaries The Alpinist, The Dawn Wall and Valley Uprising. He is also the creator of the Reel Rock Film Tour. He has produced and directed multiple films related to rock climbing, mountaineering, and outdoor adventure under the production group Sender Films.

== Early life ==
Mortimer was born in Philadelphia, Pennsylvania. He attended Colorado College graduating with honors in geology. He later attended the University of Southern California School of Cinema and Television, receiving his MFA in film.

== Career ==
His productions have won numerous film festival awards, two sports Emmys, a news and documentary Emmy, a critics choice award, and been nominated for a PGA Award. Peter is also co-founder, along with Josh Lowell of Big UP Productions, of Reel Rock, coming up on in its 17th year and showing in over 450 locations across the world. His feature film The Alpinist (featuring Marc-André LeClerc) won the prestigious award "Outstanding Long Documentary" at the 2022 Sports Emmys ceremony.

== Filmography ==
- Front Range Freaks (2003)
- Return2Sender (2005)
- First Ascent (2006)
- King Lines (2007)
- The Sharp End (2008)
- First Ascent: The Series (2010)
- Reel Rock Film Tour (2010)
- Reel Rock 6 (2011)
- Reel Rock 7 (2012)
- Reel Rock 8 (2013)
- Valley Uprising (2014)
- Reel Rock 10 (2015)
- Reel Rock TV Series (2015-)
- Reel Rock 11 (2016)
- Reel Rock 12 (2017)
- The Dawn Wall (2018)
- Reel Rock 13 (2018)
- Reel Rock 14 (2019)
- Reel Rock (2020)
- The Alpinist (2021)
- Reel Rock (2022)
- Reel Rock (2023)
- The Dark Wizard (2026)

== Awards and honors ==
Awards:

The Alpinist (2021)

- Sports Emmy Award: Long Sports Documentary
- Sports Emmy Nomination: Outstanding Camera Work
- Critics Choice Award: Best Sports Documentary
- Critics Choice Nomination: Best Cinematography

The Dawn Wall (2018)

- SXSW: Audience Award (Documentary Spotlight)
- Greenwich International Film Festival: Best Documentary Feature

Valley Uprising (2014)

- News and Documentary Emmy: Outstanding Graphic Design & Art Direction

First Ascent (2011)

- Sports Emmy: Outstanding Camera Work[17]

King Lines (2007)

- Sports Emmy: Outstanding Camera Work
