= The Alpinist =

2021 film by Peter Mortimer and Nick Rosen

- Theatrical release poster
- Directed by: Peter Mortimer; Nick Rosen
- Produced by: Ben Bryan; Clark Fyans; Mike Negri
- Starring: Marc-André Leclerc; Brette Harrington; Alex Honnold; Reinhold Messner; Barry Blanchard
- Cinematography: Jonathan Griffith; Brett Lowell; Austin Siadak
- Edited by: Josh Lowell; Joshua Steele Minor; Peter Mortimer; Fernando Villena
- Music by: Turtle
- Production companies: Red Bull Media House; Sender Films
- Distributed by: Roadside Attractions; Universal Pictures
- Release date: September 10, 2021 (United States)
- Running time: 92 minutes
- Country: United States
- Language: English
- Box office: $1.6 million

The Alpinist is a 2021 American documentary film directed by Peter Mortimer and Nick Rosen about Marc-André Leclerc, a free-spirited and little-known 23-year-old Canadian rock climber, ice climber, and alpinist. From 2015 to 2016, a film crew followed Leclerc as he solo climbed some of the most difficult and dangerous alpine climbing routes in the world.

The film was produced by Sender Films and Red Bull Media House, and distributed by Universal Pictures and Roadside Attractions. The film was given a limited release on September 10, 2021, in the United States. It received generally positive reviews from film critics and from the climbing media.

== Synopsis ==
In an interview with Tim Ferriss, Alex Honnold, the subject of the 2018 documentary film Free Solo, is asked who impresses him currently. Honnold mentions Marc-André Leclerc, a climber who is relatively unknown due to his elusive and low-profile nature. There is little video footage of Leclerc's climbs, because, as Honnold states, "He's just going out and climbing for himself in such a pure style."

In 2015, director Peter Mortimer, a climber himself, comes across a blog post about Leclerc, a 23-year-old Canadian who had solo climbed a famous climbing route known as The Corkscrew (1,250m, 5.10d, A1) on Cerro Torre. Mortimer travels to Squamish, British Columbia—the heart of Canada's climbing scene—to meet Leclerc. Leclerc is quirky and unaccustomed to being filmed. Unlike others, he doesn't care about accolades or fame; he simply climbs for his love of climbing and adventure.

Although Leclerc enjoys free solo rock climbing on Stawamus Chief in Squamish, breaking Honnold's speed record on The Grand Wall (5.11a), his main aspirations are in solo alpine climbing. Mortimer's crew travels with him to Canmore in the Canadian Rockies for ice climbing season. Although incredibly dangerous and rarely done, in a single day Leclerc solo climbs both ice and mixed routes of rock and ice, including on the notorious Stanley Headwall, where he free solos famous routes such as Nightmare on Wolf Street (WI6+, M6), French Reality (WI6+, 5.8), and Nemesis (WI6). This attracts the interest of local climbers.

Leclerc becomes restless as the film crew plans the next shoot and drops off the radar for months, to Mortimer's frustration. The crew eventually tracks Leclerc down to the Ghost River Wilderness Area in Alberta. Brette Harrington, Leclerc's girlfriend and fellow climber, remarks that Leclerc is a free spirit who does not care about films or "making his own climb significant to the world."

In April 2016, news breaks that Leclerc has completed the first winter solo ascent of the Emperor Face of Mount Robson in British Columbia via the alpine climbing route Infinite Patience (2,250m, VI, 5.9, WI5, M5). This sends shockwaves throughout the climbing community, and Mortimer is frustrated that Leclerc made the solo ascent without letting his crew know. Leclerc tells him that "it wouldn't be a solo to me if somebody was there." Having now completed the first solo ascent, Leclerc invites the crew to Mount Robson to film his method of solo alpine climbing. Leclerc carries no communication devices and climbs on-sight, meaning that he has never been on the mountain and "never rehearsed the route."

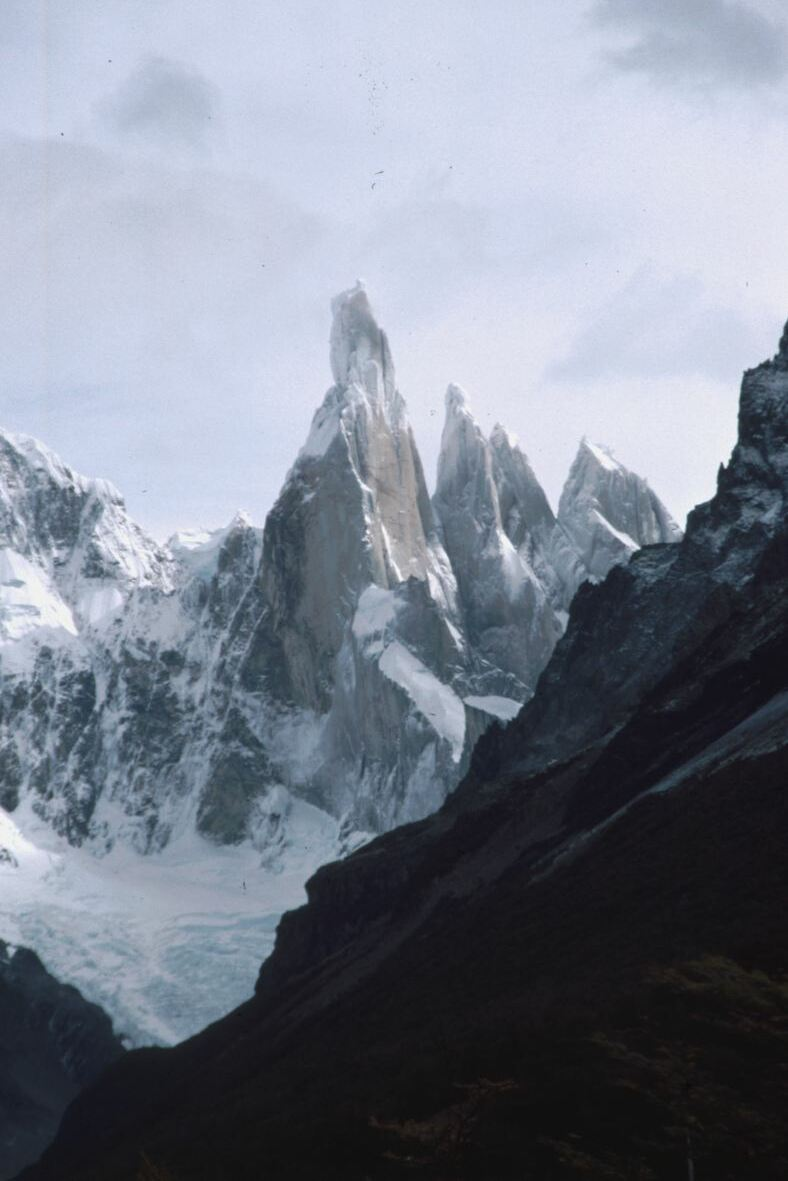
Torre Egger in Patagonia

Months later, Leclerc travels to Patagonia to attempt the first winter solo ascent of Torre Egger, and on-sight, a longtime dream of his. Leclerc allows one cameraman, his climbing friend Austin Siadak, but only for the lower sections of the route—a variation of Dani Arnold's 2010 Winter Link-Up route that finishes with Titanic (950m, 5.10, A1) on the southeast face. Leclerc would then complete the summit push alone with a small camera. After days of climbing, a snowstorm hits, and Leclerc—only four pitches from the summit—is forced to abandon his bivvy, rappel the mountain in blizzard conditions, and hike back to El Chaltén.

Mortimer expects Leclerc to pack up and fly back home, but Leclerc is determined to complete the climb. No longer an on-sight ascent, Leclerc decides to raise the stakes by climbing without any additional food or bivvy equipment. On September 17, 2016, Leclerc completes the entire route in just 21 hours, thus completing the first-ever solo winter ascent of Torre Egger on a route with difficulties of 5.10, WI3, M5, and A1.

Mortimer begins assembling the documentary with his footage. In March 2018, Harrington calls Mortimer and tells him that Leclerc and his climbing partner Ryan Johnson have gone missing while descending Mendenhall Towers in Alaska. Mortimer travels to Alaska with Harrington and Leclerc's family and friends to search for him. Near the climbers' descent route, Juneau Mountain Rescue discovers ropes buried in avalanche snow, and it is presumed that Leclerc and Johnson are both dead. Their bodies are never recovered.

Months after the accident, a memorial is held for Leclerc in Squamish.

== Cast ==
Appearing in the film as themselves were:

- Marc-André Leclerc, Canadian rock and alpine climber
- Alex Honnold, American free solo rock climber
- Will Stanhope, Squamish rock and alpine climber
- Brette Harrington, American rock and alpine climber, and girlfriend of Leclerc
- Bernadette McDonald, mountaineering historian and biographer
- Will Gadd, Canadian ice and mixed climber
- Jim Elzinga, Canadian alpinist
- Jon Walsh, Canadian alpine climber
- Barry Blanchard, Canadian alpine climber (first ascender of the Infinite Patience route on Mount Robson)
- Reinhold Messner, Italian alpine and high-altitude climber
- Raphael Slawinski, Canadian alpine and ice climber
- Michelle Kuipers, Leclerc's mother

== Release ==
The film had a limited release in the United States on September 10, 2021 and in the UK on September 24. It was released for streaming and video on demand on December 1, 2021.

== Reception ==
=== Critical response ===
On the review aggregator website Rotten Tomatoes, 93% of 45 critics' reviews are positive, with an average rating of 7.2/10. The website's consensus reads: "The Alpinist surmounts its subject's indifference to deliver a fascinating and thrillingly filmed investigation into a life spent defying danger." Metacritic, which uses a weighted average, assigned the film a score of 67 out of 100, based on 13 critics, indicating "generally favorable" reviews.

Isaac Feldberg of Roger Ebert gave the film three out of four stars, writing that "Mortimer and Rosen’s film succeeds most as a sincere, wonderstruck tribute to a fellow climber. And if glorifying a sport as lethal as alpinism itself runs a kind of risk, there’s no denying the heart-in-mouth thrill of watching Leclerc in the zone, following an impossible dream and, on his own terms, touching the sublime." Leslie Felperin of The Guardian also gave the film three out of five stars, but stated, "The film-makers' enthusiasm for his clarity of purpose is all well and good, but it does leave the film prone to hyperbole, and perhaps a more measured, sideways look at the weird dropout culture around climbing would have been more interesting."

The film was well received by the climbing media. Francis Sanzaro in Climbing said, "It might just be the best film ever made on alpine climbing, but that misses the point. The point is Marc-André Leclerc. His legacy. What drove him." Matt Skenazy in Outside said "'The Alpinist' Is the Most Compelling Climbing Film Since 'Free Solo'," and grimly noted, "Few sports seem to kill their practitioners more than alpinism." The American Alpine Club said the film was "detailed enough to appeal to a seasoned alpinist," and that "The footage of Marc soloing big ice routes around Canada and soloing the Stanley Headwall are truly mind blowing." In 2022, climbing writer Andrew Bisharat ranked The Alpinist as fifth in his "20 Best Climbing Films of All Time."

=== Accolades ===
Award	Date of ceremony	Category	Recipient(s) and nominee(s)	Result	Ref(s)
Critics' Choice Documentary Awards	November 14, 2021	Best Sports Documentary	The Alpinist	Won	
Critics' Choice Documentary Awards	November 14, 2021	Best Cinematography	Jonathan Griffith, Brett Lowell, and Austin Siadak	Nominated	
Kendal Mountain Festival	November 21, 2021	Best Mountain Film	The Alpinist	Won	
Sports Emmy Awards	May 24, 2022	Outstanding Long Sports Documentary	The Alpinist	Won	
Sports Emmy Awards	May 24, 2022	Outstanding Camera Work - Long Form	The Alpinist	Nominated	
Golden Trailer Awards	October 6, 2022	Best Documentary TV Spot (for a Feature Film)	The Alpinist	Nominated	

== See also ==
- Everest: The Other Side, 2026 film on Jim Morrison's ski-descent of Everest's north face
- Free Solo, a 2018 film on Alex Honnold's first free solo of El Capitan in Yosemite
- Meru, a 2015 film on the ascent of the Shark's Fin route on Meru Peak
