= Khergiani =

Khergiani is a Georgian surname. Notable people with the surname include:

- Nestor Khergiani (born 1975), Georgian judoka
- Mikhail Khergiani (1932–1969), Soviet mountaineer
