= Cerro Standhardt =

Mountain in Chile & Argentina

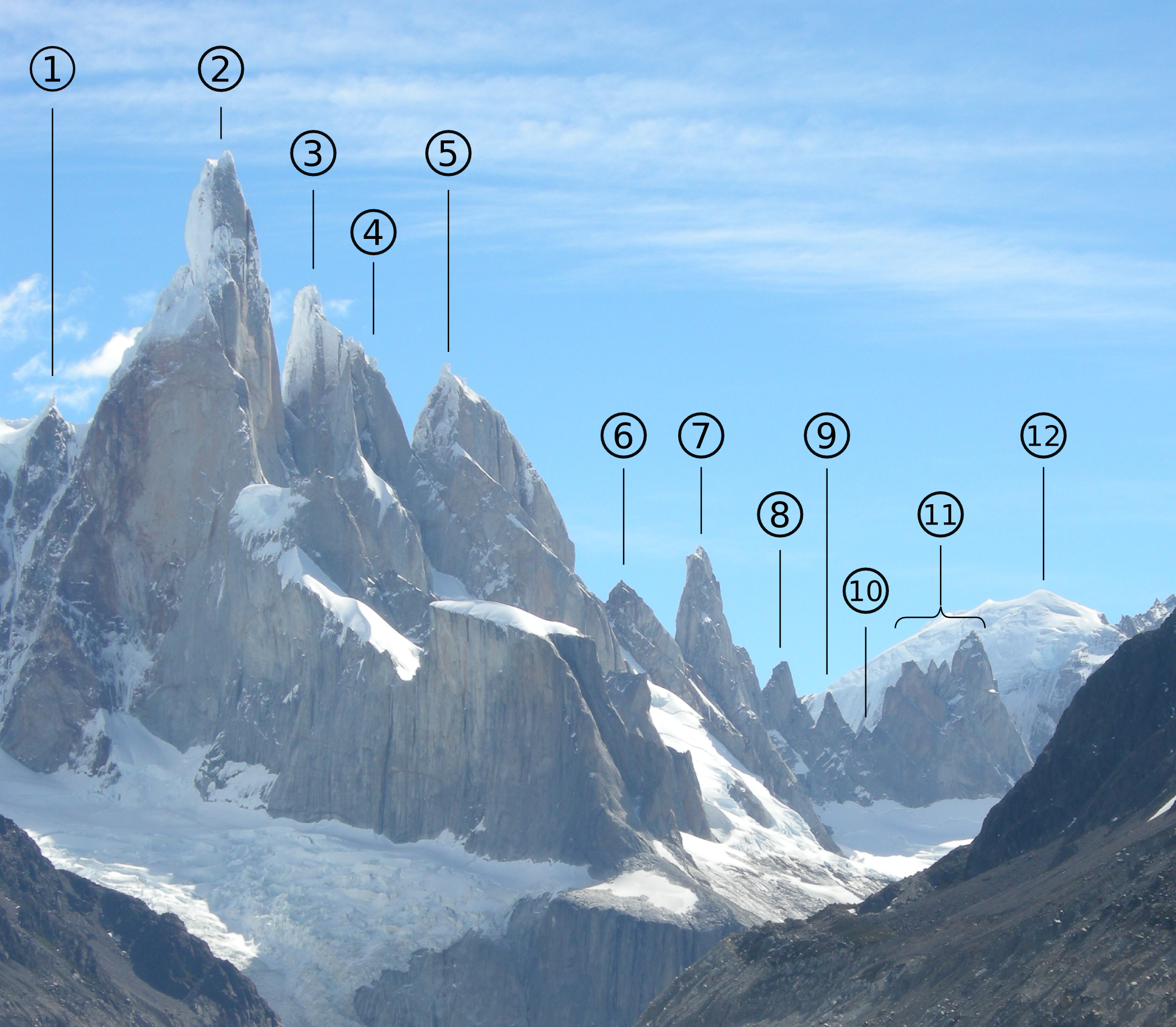
- 1: Rafael Juárez Needle, 2: Cerro Torre, 3: Torre Egger, 4: Herron Point, 5: Standhardt Needle, 6: Indio Profile, 7: Bifida Needle, 8: Pachamama Tower, 9: Achachila Tower, 10: Inti Tower, 11: Four Fingers, 12: White Dome

Highest point
- Elevation: 2,730 m (8,960 ft)
- Coordinates: 49.27559°S 73.072468°W

Geography
- Location within Southern Patagonia

Climbing
- First ascent: Jim Bridwell, Greg Smith, and Jay Smith (1988)

The Cerro Standhardt is a mountain within the disputed area between Chile and Argentina. It is the third highest of a chain of four peaks, which also includes Cerro Torre, Torre Egger, and Herron Point. The mountain is named after German photographer and naturalist Ernst Standhardt (1888–1967).

The peak is part of the Bernardo O'Higgins National Park on the Chilean side and Los Glaciares National Park on the Argentine side. Administratively, it lies in the Magallanes and Chilean Antarctica Region in Chile and the Santa Cruz Province in Argentina. Its height is 2,730 meters above sea level.

== Etymology ==
This peak was named after German photographer Ernst Standhardt (1888–1967), who was in Patagonia from the 1930s to the 1960s, photographing people to make a living. Standhardt captured some of the earliest photos of these mountains, while the foreman for pioneer Andreas Madsen.

== Ascents ==
British climbers Brian Hall and John Whittle reached 20 meters below the summit in 1977 and claimed it as an ascent. The first true summit was achieved in 1988 by Americans Jim Bridwell, Greg Smith, and Jay Smith via the "Exocet" route.

The "Torre Traverse" spans from north to south, crossing the summits of Standhardt Needle, Herron Point, Torre Egger, and Cerro Torre, covering approximately 2,200 meters. Italians Andrea Sarchi, Maurizio Giarolli, Elio Orlandi, and Ermanno Salvaterra attempted the traverse multiple times during the 1980s and early 1990s.

In 1991, Salvaterra, along with Adriano Cavallaro and Ferruccio Vidi, successfully climbed Herron Point, completing the first ascent via the northern ridge: the aesthetic "Spigolo dei Bimbi." In early 2005, Thomas Huber and Swiss climber Andi Schnarf completed the traverse from Standhardt to Egger. Initially planning to climb Standhardt via the "Festerville" route, they decided to continue to Egger from the summit and completed the traverse in 38 hours, descending via the "Titanic" route on Egger’s eastern ridge.

In 2002, Alexander Huber climbed the peak.

At the end of 2005, Salvaterra, along with Alessandro Beltrami and Rolando Garibotti, opened a new route, "El Arca de los Vientos," on Cerro Torre’s northern face. In 2006, the trio attempted the traverse again and was halted by bad weather at Standhardt Needle. Salvaterra returned in late 2007 with Beltrami, Mirko Masse, and Fabio Salvodei, climbing Standhardt via the "Otra vez" route and continuing to Herron and Egger before retreating from Cerro Torre’s "Col de la Conquista."

On November 26, 2010, American climber Colin Haley made the first solo ascent of Standhardt Needle. Using the "Exocet" route (500 m, WI5, 5.9), Haley began his climb at 4:00 am and reached the summit after 12 hours of climbing.

On August 1, 2012, Swiss climber Stephan Siegrist completed the second winter ascent of Standhardt Needle via the "Exocet" route. Siegrist became the first to complete winter ascents of all three main summits in the Cerro Torre massif: Cerro Torre, Torre Egger, and Standhardt Needle.

In February 2019, Chilean climbers Sebastián Rojas Schmidt and Fito Torrens scaled three of the four needles in the Cerro Torre massif, including Standhardt Needle. Their expedition included the "Festerville" route on Standhardt, "Spigolo dei Bimbi" on Herron Point, and "Espejo del Viento" on Torre Egger.

In February 2020, Italian climbers Matteo Della Bordella, Matteo Bernasconi, and Matteo Pasquetto, known as the "Spiders of Lecco," opened a new route on Standhardt Needle’s north face, named "Il dado è tratto" ("The die is cast"), featuring 600 meters of climbing with difficulties up to 7b/A1.

In February 2022, American climbers Jeff and Priti Wright completed a four-day traverse linking three of the main summits of the Torre massif. The pair climbed the "Festerville" route (400 m, 6c, 15 pitches) on Standhardt Needle, "Spigolo dei Bimbi" (350 m, 6c, 15 pitches) on Herron Peak, and "Espejo del viento" (200 m, 6a+, 6 pitches) on Torre Egger.
