= Sender Films =

American film production company based in Boulder, Colorado

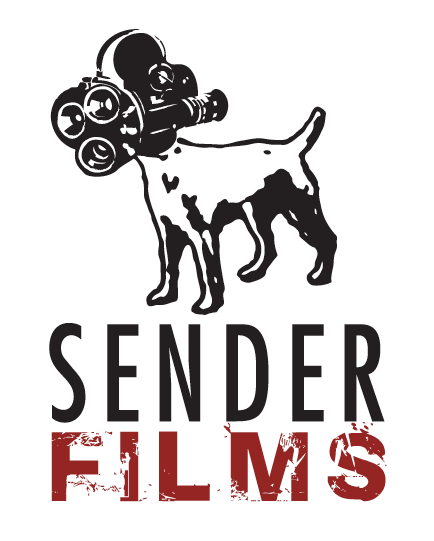
- Type: Private
- Genre: Adventure sports documentary films
- Founder: Peter Mortimer
- Headquarters: Boulder, Colorado, USA
- Website: Official website

Sender Films is an American film production company based in Boulder, Colorado. Productions include outdoor adventure films, television shows, and commercials.

== Company ==
Sender Films integrates action with story-telling to create climbing/mountaineering and adventure sports documentary films. Sender Films goes inside the sport of hard-core climbing, focusing on climbers driven to obscure accomplishments. According to Outside Magazine, Sender Films has "focused on character-driven narratives." Over the past three years, Sender Films has produced the six-part series First Ascent with National Geographic International. They have also been producing adventure film segments for US TV networks such as NBC, The Weather Channel, and Outside TV.

== Recent work ==
- On March 9, 2018, The Dawn Wall premieres at South by Southwest in Austin, TX.
- Teamed up with the Google Street View team throughout 2015 and 2016 to create the first vertical Street View up the side of El Capitan in Yosemite National Park, as well as Street View of the tallest mountain in Western Europe, Mont Blanc. The Google Treks: El Capitan was nominated for two Webby Awards in 2016.
- In 2016, The feature documentary Valley Uprising won a News and Documentary Emmy: Outstanding Graphic Design and Art Direction.
- On April 25, 2015, the feature documentary Valley Uprising had its television premiere headlining Discovery Channel's Elevation Weekend.
- During Ueli Steck and Simone Moro's attempted ascent of Mount Everest in April 2013, a conflict between climbers and sherpas derailed the expedition and put the climbers in the national spotlight. Sender Films later that year released their retelling of the events as "High Tension: Ueli Steck and the Clash on Everest" along with the REEL ROCK 8 Film Tour.
- Filmed 26-year-old Alex Honnold completing the Triple Solo in Yosemite Valley, CA for one of their Reel Rock Film Tour 2012 short films.
- Reel Rock Film Tour 2011, part of an annual compilation of adventure film shorts that is co-produced by Sender Films and Big UP Productions, featured a short film called Sketchy Andy. Andy Lewis, or Sketchy Andy, is a professional slackliner, highliner, and BASE jumper. He was recently featured in the Super Bowl XLVI halftime show alongside Madonna.
- Free solo climber Alex Honnold was also featured in a 60 Minutes special detailing his impressive feats as a climber. Sender Films shot the 60 minutes piece on location in Eldorado Springs, CO and Yosemite, CA with 60 Minutes crew members including Laura Logan.

== Films ==
- The Alpinist (2021), a feature-length documentary about free solo ice climber Marc-André Leclerc
- Reel Rock 15 (2020), features four new climbing films: "Black Ice", "Action Directe", "First Ascent, Last Ascent", "Deep Roots"
- Reel Rock 14 (2019) features three films: "The High Road", "United States of Joe’s", and "The Nose Speed Record".
- Reel Rock 13 (2018), features four new climbing adventure films: "Age of Ondra", "Valley of the Moon", "Up To Speed, "Queen Maud Land"
- The Dawn Wall (2018), Tommy Caldwell and Kevin Jorgeson climb the vertical face of El Capitan, in Yosemite National Park.
- Reel Rock 12 (2017), premieres four new short films: "Break On Through", "Safety Third", "Above The Sea", and "Stumped"
- Reel Rock 11 (2016), features five climbing and adventure films: "Young Guns", "Boys in the Bugs", "Brette", "Rad Dad", and "Dodo's Delight"
- Reel Rock 10 (2015), consisted of five films: "A Line Across the Sky", "Dean Potter Tribute", "High and Mighty", "24 Hours of Horseshoe Hell" and "Dawn Wall Exclusive"
- Valley Uprising (2014), feature-length documentary
- Reel Rock 8 (2013), consisted of the following films: "The Sensei", "Spice Girl", and "High Tension"
- Reel Rock 7 (2012), consisted of four films: "Wideboyz", "La Dura Dura", "Honnold 3.0", and "The Shark's Fin"
- Reel Rock 6 (2011), featured these short films; "Origins: Obe and Ashima", "Race for the Nose", ""Sketchy" Andy", "Ice Revolution", "Project Dawn Wall", and "Cold" ===First Ascent:
- First Ascent: the Series (2010), a 6-part series that aired on the Travel Channel and the National Geographic Adventure Channel.
- Reel Rock 5 (2009), featured short films, "The Hulk", "First Round First Minute", "Fly Or Die", "Down and Out and Under", "The Hardest Moves", and "The Swiss Machine"
- The Sharp End (2008), documentary
- King Lines (2007), a film about Chris Sharma
- First Ascent (2006), Documentary about climbers in pursuit of a first ascent.
- Return2Sender (2005), a compilation of short climbing films
- Front Range Freaks (2003), a short film detailing many of Colorado's Front Range climbers tackling Front Range routes.

== Crew ==
Peter Mortimer: President/Partner

- Peter Mortimer is a filmmaker who lives in Boulder, Colorado, and is the founder of the adventure film company Sender Films. Peter is also co-founder, along with Josh Lowell of Big UP Productions, of the REEL ROCK Film Tour, coming up on its 13th year and showing in over 500 locations across the world.

Nick Rosen: Partner

- Nick Rosen is a partner, writer, and producer at Sender Films. He is co-creator of the Emmy-nominated National Geographic Television Series, First Ascent, and co-director of The Sharp End as well as Valley Uprising.

== Awards and honors ==
- News and Documentary Emmy: Outstanding Graphic Design and Art Direction - Valley Uprising (2014)
- Sports Emmy: Outstanding Camera Work - King Lines (2007)
- News and Documentary Emmy: Outstanding Graphic Design and Art Direction - First Ascent (2011)
- Sports Emmy: Outstanding Camera Work - First Ascent (2011)
