= Jirishanca =

Mountain in Peru

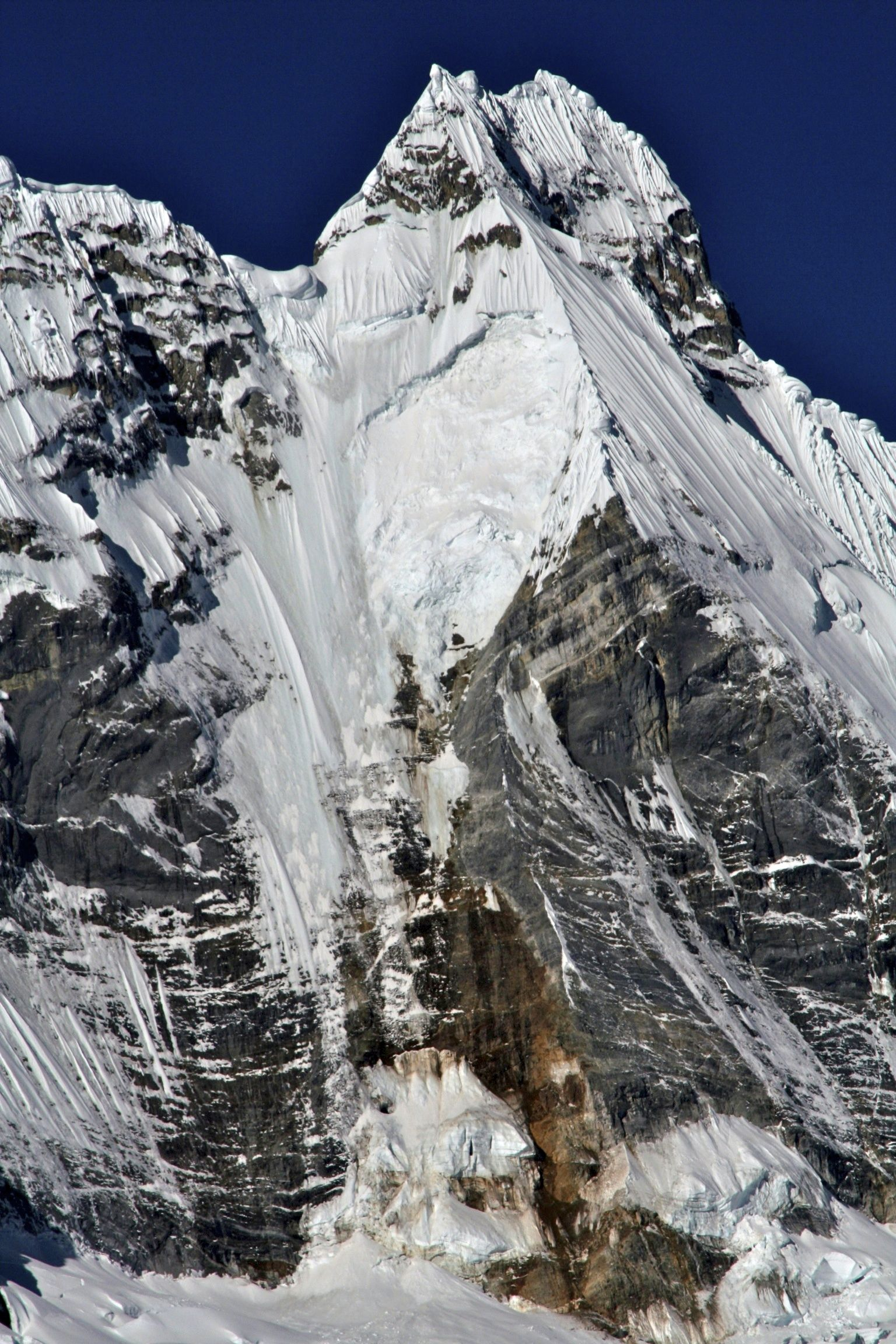
- Jirishanca, West Face, July 2010

Highest point
- Elevation: 6,125 m (20,095 ft)
- Prominence: 484 m (1,588 ft)
- Parent peak: Yerupaja
- Coordinates: 10°14′12″S 76°54′18″W

Geography
- Location within Peru
- Location: Ancash Region, Peru
- Parent range: Andes, Huayhuash

Climbing
- First ascent: 12 July 1957 - Toni Egger and Siegfried Jungmeir (Austria)

Jirishanca is a 6,094-metre-high (19,993 ft) mountain in the Huayhuash mountain range in west central Peru, part of the Andes. Other sources cite a height of 6,125 metres (20,095 ft). It is the 10th highest peak in Peru and the third in the Huayhuash range (after Yerupajá and Siula Grande). Jirishanca translates as "hummingbird bill peak".

== Ascents ==
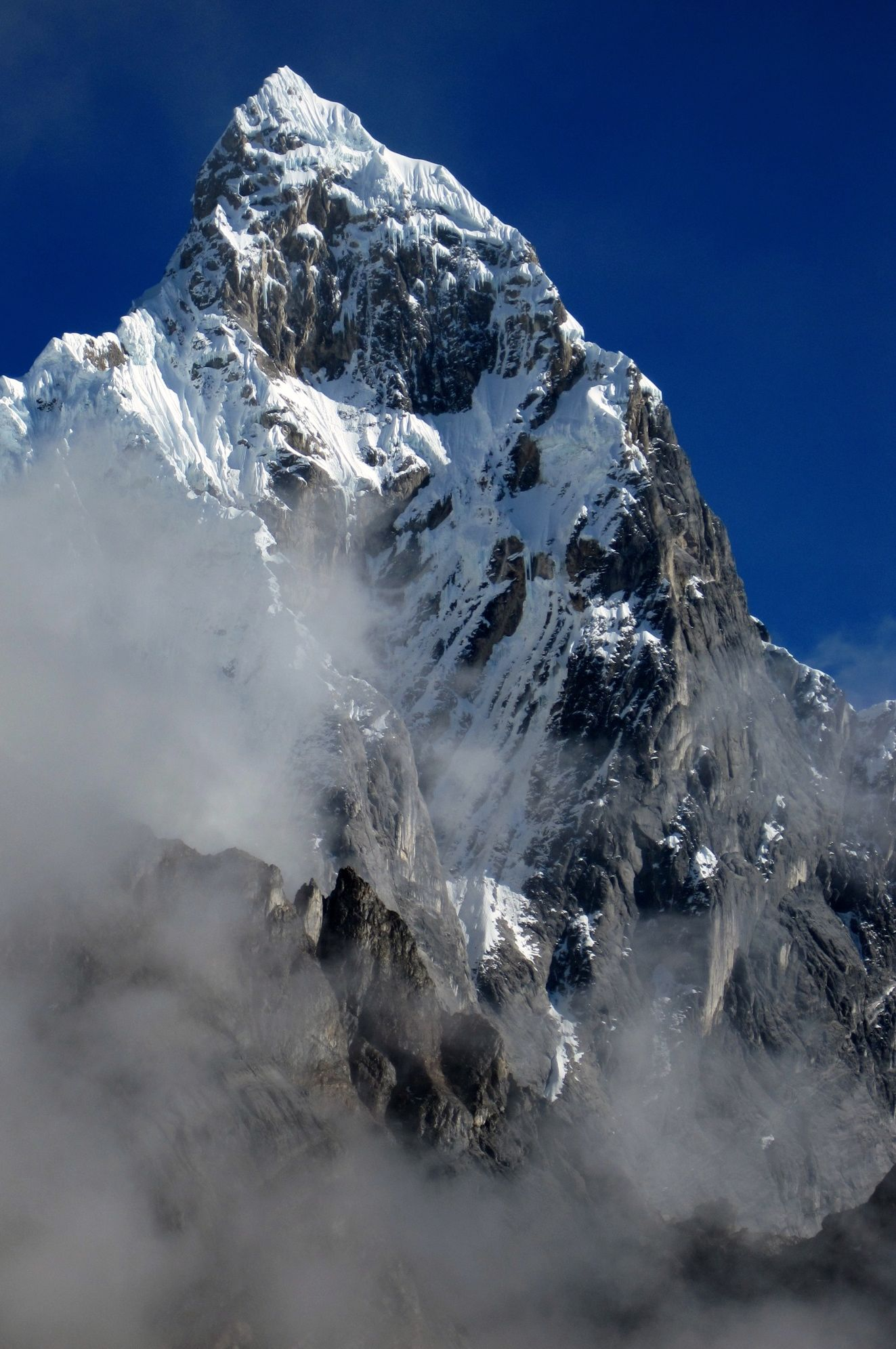
The southeast face of Jirishanca

The mountain is notoriously difficult and has seen very few successful ascents. The first ascent in July 1957 by the Austrian mountaineers Toni Egger and Siegfried Jungmair over the (north)east face has been called "one of the boldest climbing feats ever performed in the Cordillera". Their route has only been repeated once. In 1964 Gary Colliver and Glen Denny of an American expedition climbed the north ridge to the slightly lower north summit, but a traverse over the "cockscomb of ice" connecting to the main summit has so far not been attempted. On July 6, 1969, an Italian team led by the 60-year-old Riccardo Cassin forged the first route through the West face. On July 31, 1971 the Americans Dean Caldwell and Jon Bowlin first climbed the southwest face in two days. Leaving their expedition below, Bowlin and Caldwell forged their own route and reached the peak on August 1, and were back at base camp by August 2. In 1973, a Japanese team led by Masayuki Shinohara succeeded in climbing the south east face for the first time, though it took them 49 days.

== Climbing ==
It is one of the hardest 6000 meter mountains of the Andes. The easier route to the summit is quoted TD but more difficult routes exist, many on them on vertical ice and with overhanging section of mixed terrain such as the Cassin route (70° ice and a pitch rated UIAA IV+).

== Elevation ==
The altitude of 6125 isn't likely as other data from available digital elevation models show lower elevations: SRTM yields 6028 metres and TanDEM-X 5734 metres. The height of the nearest key col is 5610 meters, leading to a topographic prominence of 484 meters. Jirishanca is considered a Mountain according to the Dominance System and its dominance is 7.94%. Its parent peak is Yerupaja and the Topographic isolation is 3.5 kilometers.

== 1954 Air accident ==
On 16 November 1954 a Peruvian military Douglas DC-3 (registration FAP403), operated by Fuerza Aérea del Perú, on a domestic flight from Pucallpa Airport in Pucallpa to Limatambo Airport in Lima crashed into an ice wall on the south-east slopes of Jirishanca at an altitude of 18,000 feet (5,500 meters). All of the 24 people on board were killed, the wreckage was not found until 4 December.
