= Emilio Comici =

Italian mountaineer

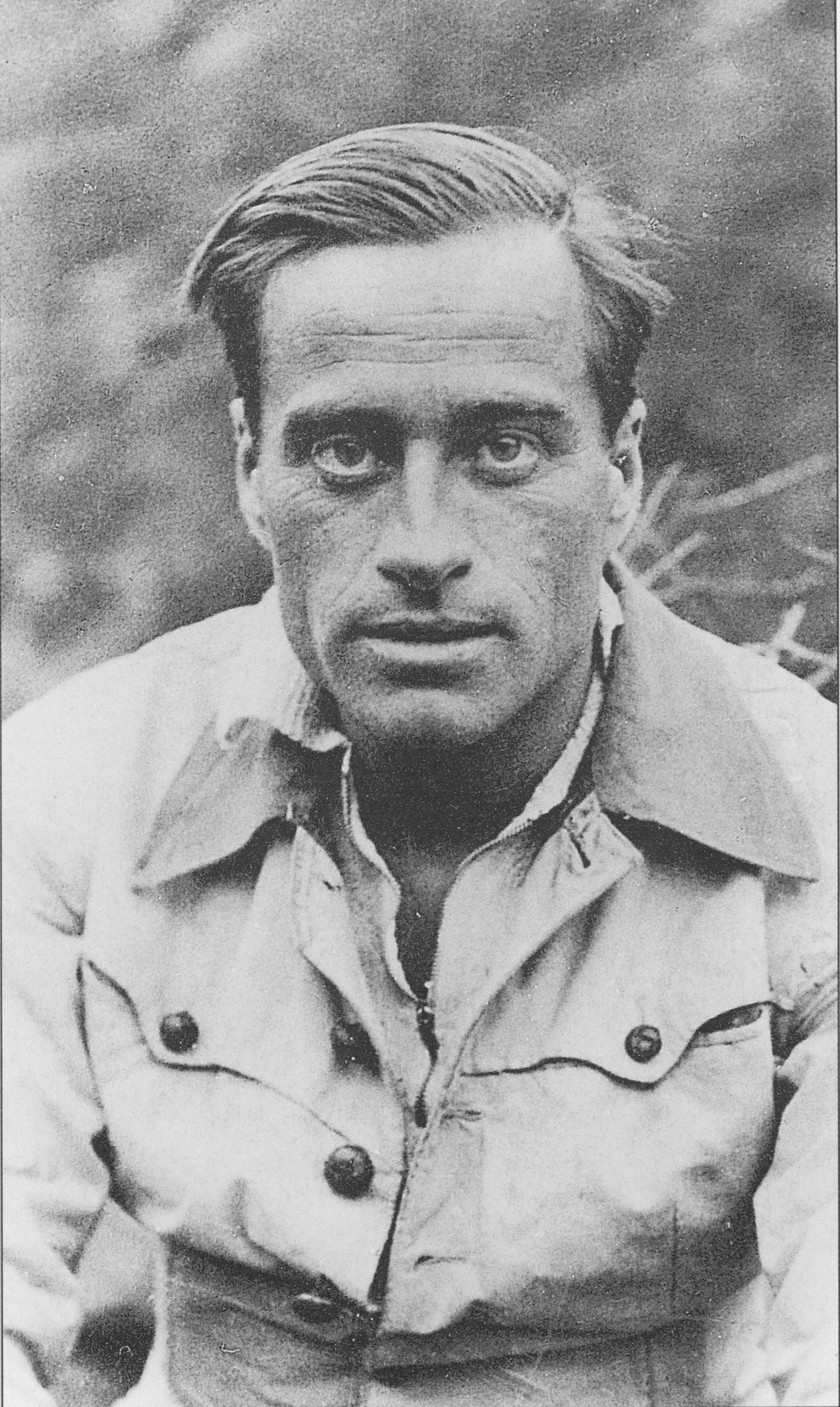
- Born: Leonardo Emilio Comici; 21 February 1901; Trieste, Italy
- Died: 19 October 1940 (aged 39); Sëlva, Val Gardena, Italy
- Occupations: Mountain climber, caver

Leonardo Emilio Comici (21 February 1901 – 19 October 1940) was an Italian mountain climber and caver. He made numerous ascents in the Eastern Alps, particularly in the Dolomites (where he made over 200 first ascents during his career) and in the Julian Alps. Comici was nicknamed the "Angel of the Dolomites".

In the 1930s and 1940s Comici and other climbers (including Riccardo Cassin, Raffaele Carlesso and Alvise Andrich) represented the Italian answer to the achievements of German climbers. Comici perfected the Bavarian technique of mountain climbing, and began the era of "sixth grade" climbing (at that time the highest climbing grade considered humanly surmountable). He was the inventor and proponent of using multi-step aid ladders, solid belays, the use of a trail/tag line, and hanging bivouacs, contributing greatly to the techniques of big wall climbing.

== Biography ==
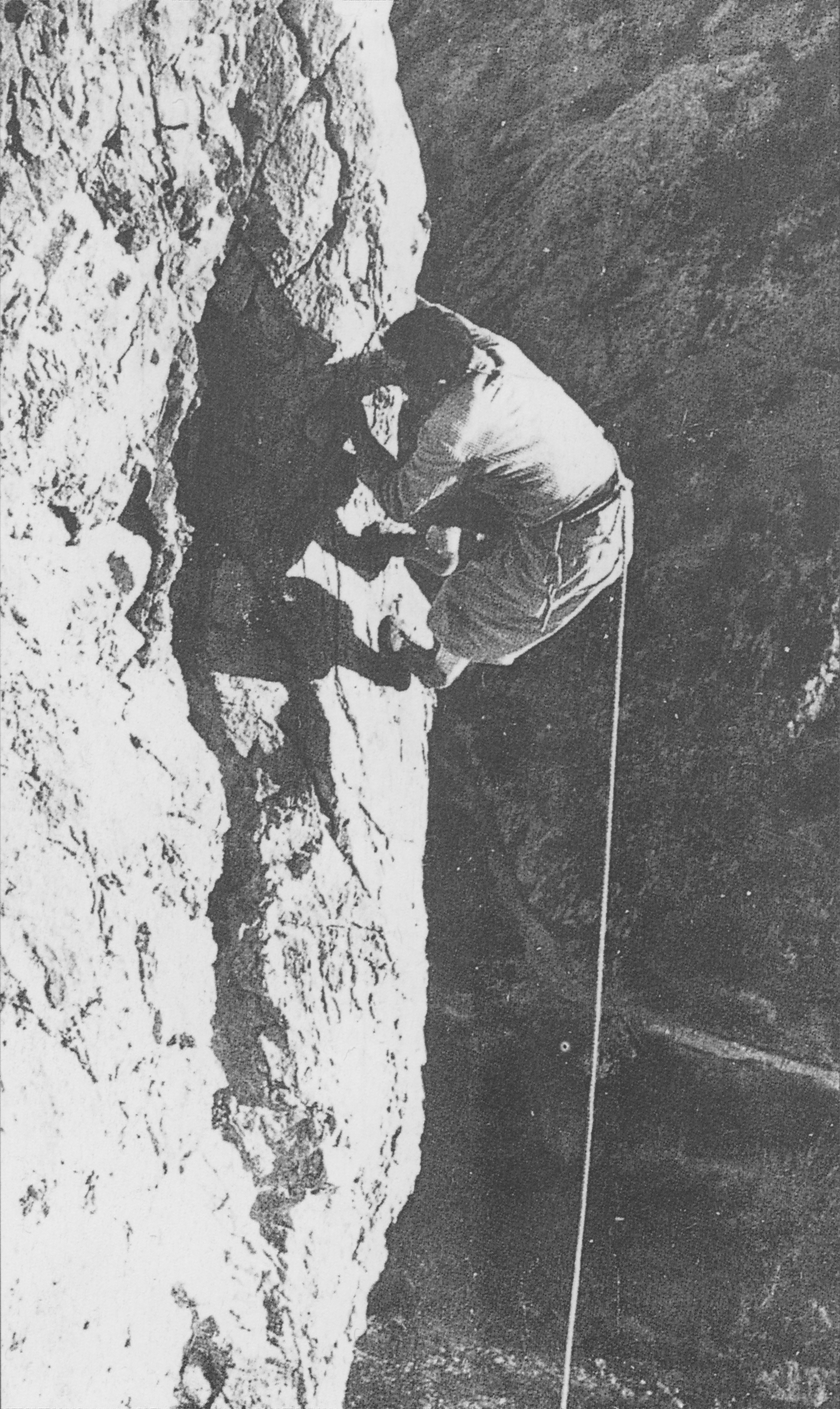
Comici free climbing in Val Rosandra.

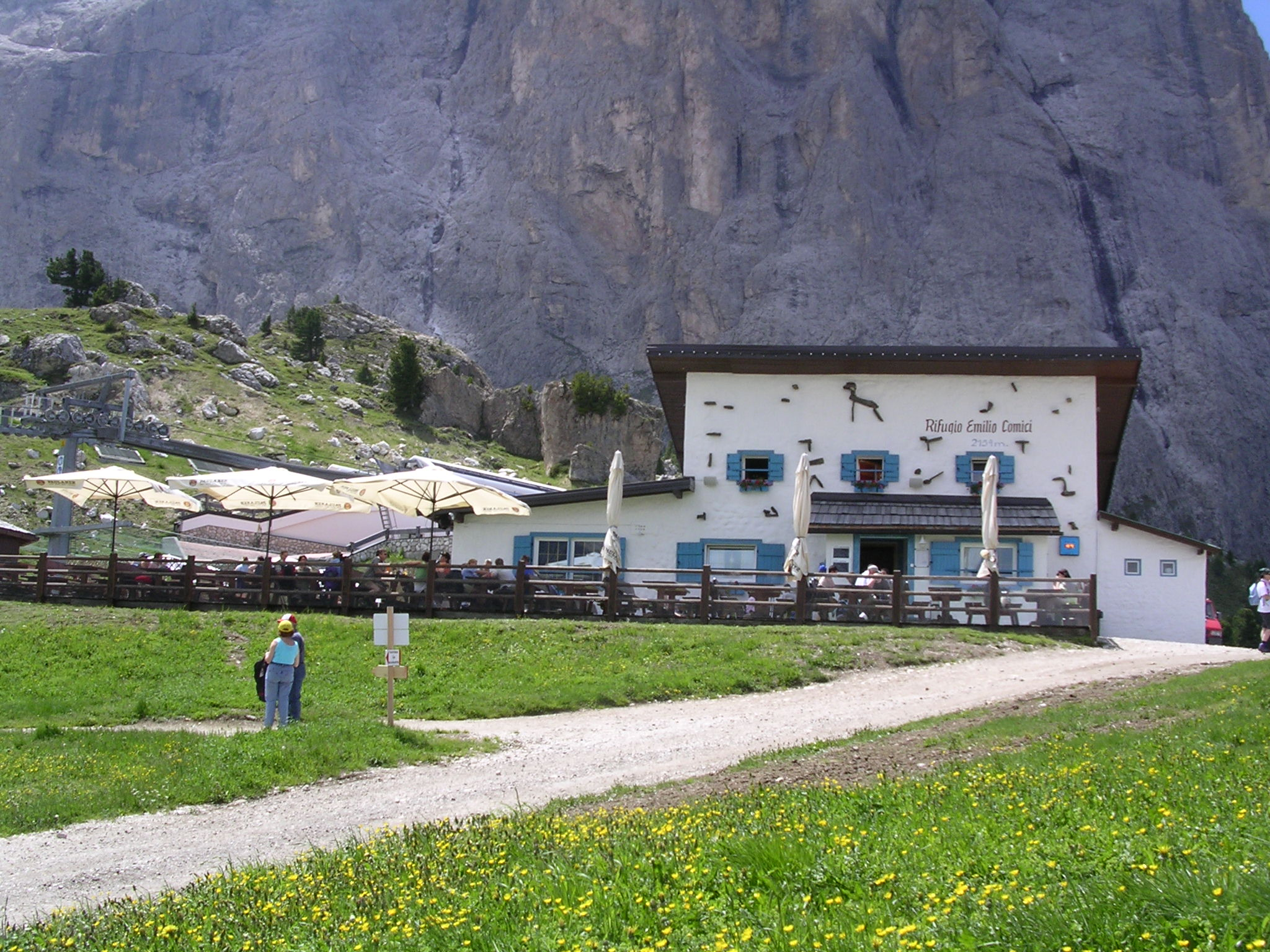
The Rifugio Emilio Comici at Sëlva.

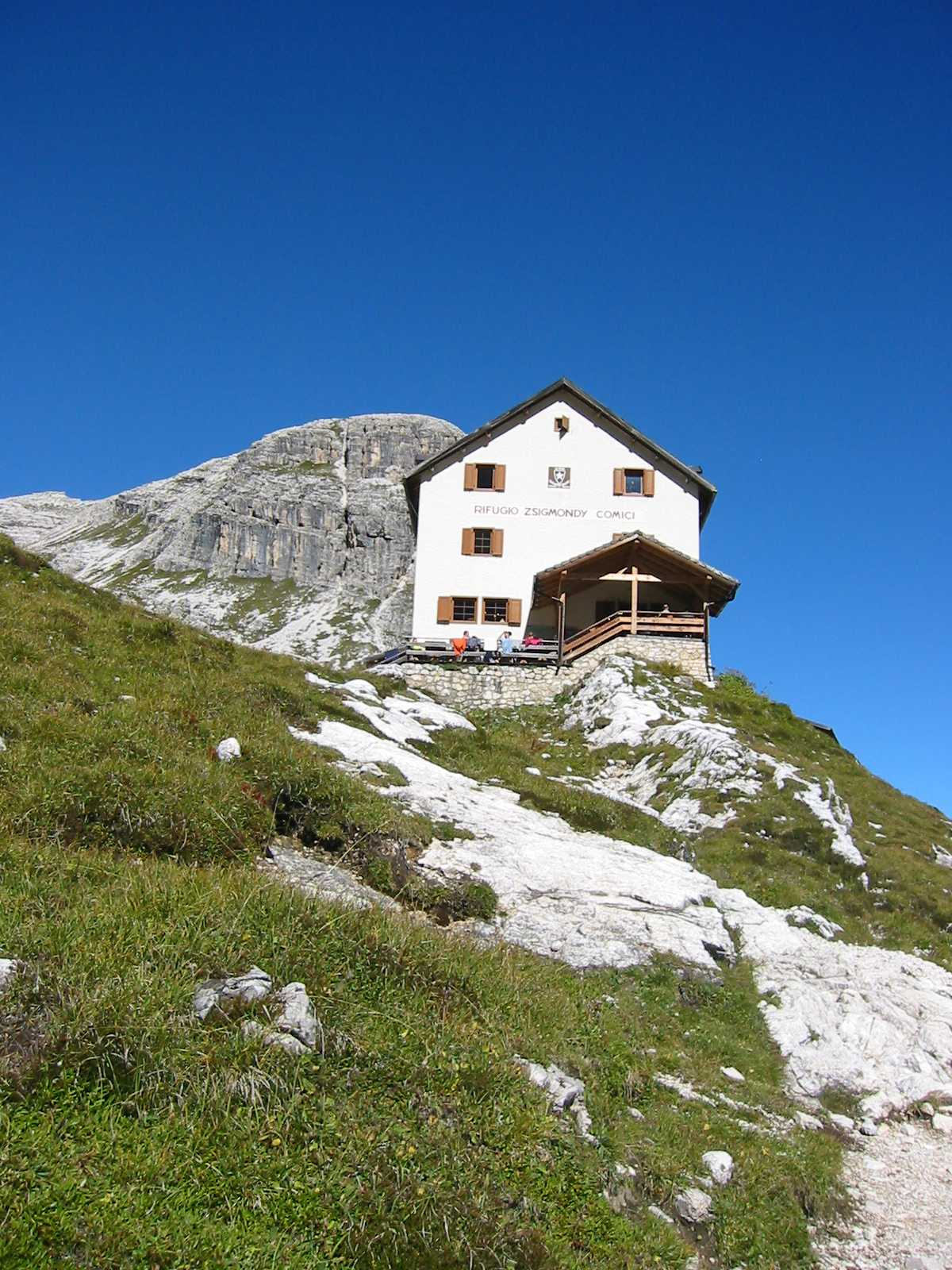
The Rifugio Zsigmondy-Comici.

Emilio Comici was the son of Antonio Comici and Regina Cartago. A longshoreman in his youth, he began mountain climbing after caving for ten years (1918-1927), following the Trieste tradition of mountaineering represented by Napoleone Cozzi and Julius Kugy. As a caver, Comici set a world depth record of 500 metres (1,600 ft) near Trieste. He began climbing at the suggestion of friends from the Trieste chapter of the Italian Alpine Club, gaining his first experience in the nearby Val Rosandra.

In 1932 Comici moved to Lake Misurina in the municipality of Auronzo di Cadore, where he opened a climbing school. Comici's students included Riccardo Cassin, later a prominent climber. From 1938 to 1940 he served as podestà (mayor) of Sëlva in Val Gardena, where he also directed the ski school. He was a supporter of the Fascist regime of Benito Mussolini, which promoted him by sending him on lecture tours.

He died in an accidental fall caused by a frayed rope on the training cliffs of the Sëlva climbing area in Val Gardena. For a long time the precise circumstances were not reported by the Fascist authorities, who did not want to cast a shadow on the famous figure of Comici.

In addition to his talents as a climber, Comici is remembered for his aesthetic concept of climbing, perceiving it as a means of self-expression through harmonious movement. It was Comici who originated the concept of climbing direttissima routes, following the path a drop of water would take down the mountain. Comici's book Alpinismo Eroico employs rhetoric characteristic of the era in which it was written.

The Rifugio Zsigmondy-Comici, or Zsigmondyhütte, in the Sexten Dolomites is named for Comici and Emil Zsigmondy. The Rifugio Emilio Comici and the Campanile Comici, both in the Langkofel Group, are also named for Comici. A wooden monument memorializes Comici at the foot of the wall in Vallunga where he died.

== Ascents ==
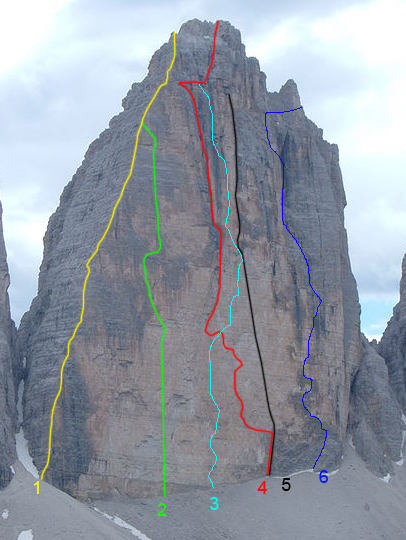
Routes on the north face of the Cima Grande (Große Zinne) of the Tre Cime di Lavaredo: 1=Dibona, 2=Via Camillotto Pellesier, 3=Das Phantom der Zinne, 4=Hasse/Brandler (Direttissima), 5=Sachsenweg (Superdirettissima), 6=Comici/Dimai

=== North face of Cima Grande ===
From 13 to 14 August 1933 Comici and the brothers Angelo and Giuseppe Dimai made the first ascent of the north face 550 metres (1,800 ft) of the Cima Grande di Lavaredo, thus opening the eponymous Via Comici-Dimai (Comici-Dimai Route) or Comici route. In this climb of 400 meters, they used rope, 150 meters of cord, 90 hooks, climbing slings, 40 carabiners and 80 pitons. There had been several previous failed attempts on the face by other climbers. However, the technique used by Comici's party, and specifically their use of pitons, became the subject of debate among mountaineers. In September 1937, Comici repeated his route as a solo climber in just 3.5 hours. The route was then rated at a difficulty of VI. Today, the rating is VI/A0 (UIAA) or in free climbing VII (UIAA).

=== Other ascents ===
- Via Comici - Summit of Riofreddo - 8 August 1928 - First ascent with Giordano Bruno Fabjan, north face
- Via Comici-Fabjan - Tre Sorelle - 26–27 August 1929 - First ascent with Giordano Bruno Fabjan, VI north face. Considered the first Italian sixth grade climb.
- Via Comici-Benedetti - Monte Civetta - 4–5 August 1931 - First ascent with Giulio Benedetti, 1,050 metres (3,440 ft), VI, A2 northwest face
- Via Comici-Cassin - Zuccone Campelli - 28 May 1933 - First ascent with Riccardo Cassin, Mario Dell'Oro "Boga", Mary Varale and Mario Spreafico "Umett", 140 metres (460 ft), IV west face
- Yellow Edge - Cima Piccola di Lavaredo - 8–9 September 1933 - First ascent with Mary Varale and Renato Zanutti, 350 metres (1,150 ft), VI+ southeast edge
- Via Comici - Punta of Frida - 2 August 1934 - Ascent with Giordano Bruno Fabjan, Vittorio Cottafavi and Gianfranco Pompei, 170 metres (560 ft), V, VI east face
- Via Comici - Torre Piccola of Falzarego - 10 August 1934 - First ascent with Mary Varale and Sandro Del Torso, 230 metres (750 ft), V south edge
- Via Comici-Del Torso-Zanutti - Torre Comici - July 1936 - First ascent with Sandro Del Torso and Renato Zanutti, 300 metres (980 ft), V, VI east face
- Via Comici - [Dito di Dio] - 8–9 September 1936 - first ascent with Piero Mazzorana and Sandro Del Torso, 600 metres (2,000 ft), VI north face
- Via Comici-Dimai - Cima Grande di Lavaredo - 2 September 1937 - Solo ascent in 3.5 hours, north face
- Via Comici - "Salami" in the Sassolungo ("Campanile Comici") - 28–29 August 1940 - First ascent with Severino Casara, 450 metres (1,480 ft), VI north face

== Bibliography ==
- Comici, Emilio. Alpinismo Eroico. Ed. Hoepli 1942 and 1950, Ed. Vivalda 1995.
- Casara, Severino (1957). L' Arte di arrampicare di Emilio Comici. Ed. Hoepli.
- Casara, Severino. Arrampicate libere. Ed. Corticelli 1944, Ed. Hoepli 1950.
- Xydias, Spiro Dalla Porta (1985). Se tu vens... cento anni di alpinismo triestino. Ed. Lint Trieste.
- Gasparro, Dario (2008). La Val Rosandra e l'ambiente circostante. ed. Lint Trieste.
- Smart, David (2020). Emilio Comici: Angel of the Dolomites: Passion, Pitons, Politics and the First Big Walls.
