= Torre Egger =

Mountain in Argentina and Chile

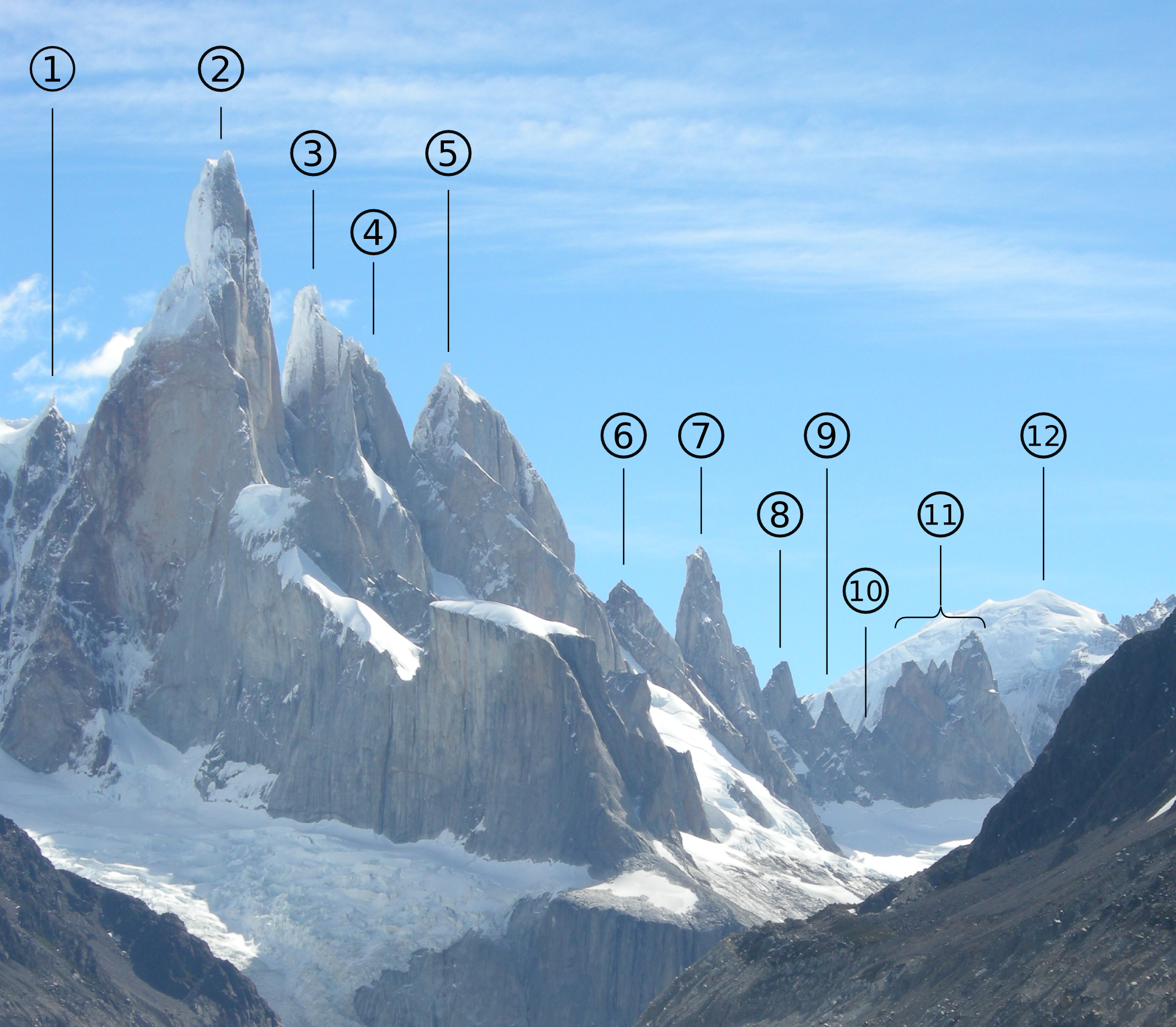
- Some peaks of the Cerro Torre Group. 2: Cerro Torre, 3: Torre Egger, 4: Punta Herron, 5: Aguja Standhart, 7: Aguja Bífida, 11: Cuatro Dedos.

Highest point
- Elevation: 2,685 m (8,809 ft)
- Prominence: 275 m (902 ft)
- Coordinates: 49°17′34″S 73°05′54″W

Geography
- Location: Patagonia, Argentina, Chile (disputed)
- Parent range: Andes

Climbing
- First ascent: February 1976: Bragg, Donini, Wilson (US)
- Easiest route: rock/snow/ice

Torre Egger is one of the peaks in the Southern Patagonian Ice Field in South America, located between Argentina and Chile, west of Cerro Chalten (or Fitz Roy). Torre Egger lies between Cerro Torre, the highest in a four mountain chain and Cerro Standhardt. It is named after the Austrian alpinist Toni Egger (1926–1959), who died while climbing on Cerro Torre.

== First ascent ==
In 1976, John Bragg, Jim Donini and Jay Wilson from the United States climbed Torre Egger by climbing first to the col between the peak and Cerro Torre, the Col of Conquest, and then up the ridge to the peak. The ascent was hampered by bad weather and took from December 1975 to February 22, 1976, when the 3-person team summited.

== Other ascents ==
- 1986 Psycho Vertical (Southeast Face) (UIAA ED+ VII+ A3 90deg, 950m) Janez Jeglič, Silvo Karo, Franc Knez (Slovenia), December 7, 1986.
- 1987 Titanic (East Pillar) (UIAA VI+ A2 7b M5 WI4, 950m), Maurizio Giarolli and Elio Orlandi (Italy), November 2 to 5, 1987.
- 1994 Badlands (YDS VI 5.10 A3 WI4+, 1000m) Conrad Anker, Jay Smith and Steve Gerberding (US), FA 12 December 1994.
- 2005 Titanic (East Pillar) (UIAA VI+ A2 7b M5 WI4, 950m) Steph Davis, Dean Potter. The first female ascent of Torre Egger and likely the first one-day ascent of the mountain.
- 2012 Die another day (west face) (UIAA VIII A1) Matteo Bernasconi, Matteo Della Bordella. The route ends 25m below Col de Lux.
- 2013 Notti Magiche (West face) (UIAA VIII A1) Matteo Della Bordella, Luca Schiera. From Col de Lux to the top, followed the Huber-Sharf, 200m of rock and ice.
- 2016 Titanic (East Pillar) (UIAA VI+ A2 7b M5 WI4, 950m) Marc-André Leclerc. First winter solo.
- 2020 Marc-André’s Vision (East Pillar) (Grade unknown) Brette Harrington, Quentin Roberts, Horacio Gratton. A new route next to Titanic first spotted by the late Marc-André Leclerc while rappeling down. The route was named in his honor.

In January 2008, Rolando Garibotti and Colin Haley made the first complete traverse of the entire massif, climbing Aguja Standhardt, Punta Herron, Torre Egger and Cerro Torre together. They rate their route at YDS VI 5.11 A1 WI6 Mushroom Ice 6, with 2,200 m (7,200 ft) total vertical gain. This had been "one of the world's most iconic, unclimbed lines", first attempted by Ermanno Salvaterra.
