= Nick Rosen (American filmmaker) =

American film producer

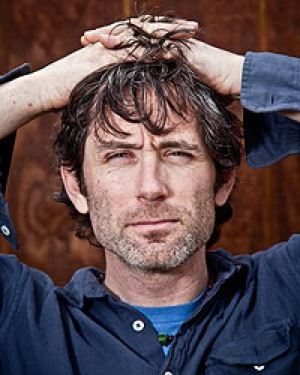
- Born: August 21, 1974 (age 51); Quebec, Canada
- Citizenship: United States
- Education: MIA
- Alma mater: Columbia University
- Occupation: Filmmaker
- Organization: Sender Films
- Awards: Sports Emmy News and Documentary Emmy Nomination: Outstanding Graphic Design & Art Direction

Nick Rosen (born 21 August 1974) is an American filmmaker living in Colorado. He is a partner, writer, and producer at Sender Films. He is the director, with his partner Peter Mortimer, of feature documentary films including The Dark Wizard, The Alpinist and Valley Uprising and the National Geographic series, First Ascent, and a co-creator of the REEL ROCK Film Tour.

== Biography ==
Rosen was born in Quebec, Canada. He attended Colorado College graduating with a B.A. in political science. He later attended the Columbia University School of International and Public Affairs, receiving his masters. He had a ten-year career as a freelance journalist working for various publications such as LA Weekly and Boulder Weekly. Nick began working as a writer/producer/director with Sender Films in 2005.

Nick has also developed a career as on-screen talent, starring in the yoga documentary, 'Enlighten Up!' (2008).

== Filmography ==
- First Ascent (2006)
- King Lines (2007)
- Enlighten Up! (2008)
- The Sharp End (2008)
- First Ascent: The Series (2010)
- Reel Rock Film Tour (2010)
- Reel Rock Film Tour (2011)
- Valley Uprising (2014)
- Reel Rock 10 (2015)
- Reel Rock 11 (2016)
- Reel Rock 12 (2017)
- The Dawn Wall (2018)
- Reel Rock 13 (2018)
- Reel Rock 14 (2019)
- Reel Rock 15 (2021)
- The Alpinist (2021)
- Reel Rock 16 (2022)
- Reel Rock 17 (2023)
- The Dark Wizard (2026)

== Awards and nominations ==
King Lines (2007)

- Sports Emmy: Outstanding Camera Work

First Ascent (2011)

- Sports Emmy: Outstanding Camera Work

Valley Uprising (2014)

- News and Documentary Emmy: Outstanding Graphic Design & Art Direction

The Alpinist (2021)

- Sports Emmy: Best Longform documentary
