= Yerupaja Chico =

Mountain in Peru

- Location within Peru

Highest point
- Elevation: 6,121 m (20,082 ft)
- Coordinates: 10°14′54″S 76°54′09″W

Geography
- Location: Lima Province, Peru
- Parent range: Andes, Huayhuash

Climbing
- First ascent: Toni Egger and Siegfried Jungmair, July 1957

Yerupaja Chico (also known as El Toro) is a mountain in Peru.

Yerupaja Chicho rises 6,121 metres (20,082 ft) and neighboring Yerupaja rises 6,617 metres (21,709 ft). The names' literal translations are yerupaja – smaller and yerupaja – larger. They are two peaks in the Peruvian Andes. They can be viewed from above Laguna Solteracocha on the way up to Punta Sambuya on trekking trails through the Huayhuash. Chico is claimed to be a technically more difficult project for mountain climbers, although it is approximately 600 metres lower.

The mountains other name, El Toro (the bull), is said to derive from the view from the west: "Its summit is broad like bull's neck (hence its name); viewed from the west it even shows itself crowned by two horns, but its flanks, too, are wild like a bull's."

Toni Egger and Siegfried Jungmair made the first ascent in July 1957. They climbed a "ramp leading from right to left, to the summit ridge over the gigantic, 1500m east face of the mountain". During the climb they faced a very close encounter with 'a gigantic ice-avalanche'. The danger of further ice-avalanches and the threat of rockfalls on the east face led them to risk making the descent by an unexplored line which involved abseiling for over 550m down ice and rock faces.
