= Riccardo Cassin =

Italian mountaineer and businessman

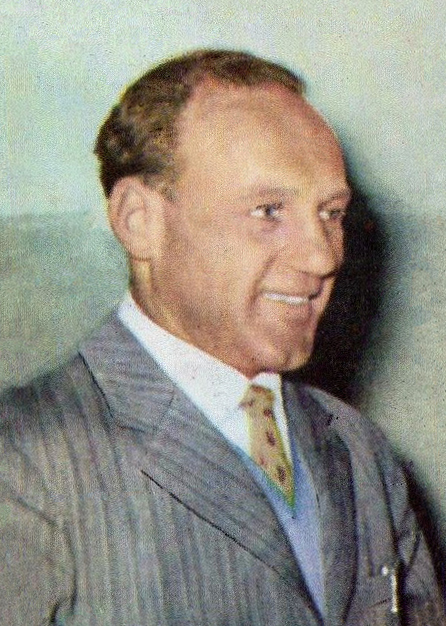
Riccardo Cassin

Riccardo Cassin (2 January 1909 – 6 August 2009) was an Italian mountaineer, developer of mountaineering equipment and author, and an important figure in the history of rock climbing, alpine climbing and big wall climbing.

== Life ==
Cassin was born into a peasant family at San Vito al Tagliamento in Friuli, in the kingdom of Italy. When he was three his father Valentino emigrated to Canada, where he died in a mining accident in 1913 when aged 29. Cassin left school at the age of 12 to work for a blacksmith. In 1926, at the age of 17, he moved to Lecco, where he found employment at a steel plant. His first love was boxing, but he soon became fascinated by the mountains that tower over Lake Como and Lake Garda.

In 1940 he married Irma, with whom he had three sons: Valentino, Pierantonio and Guido.

== Alpinism ==
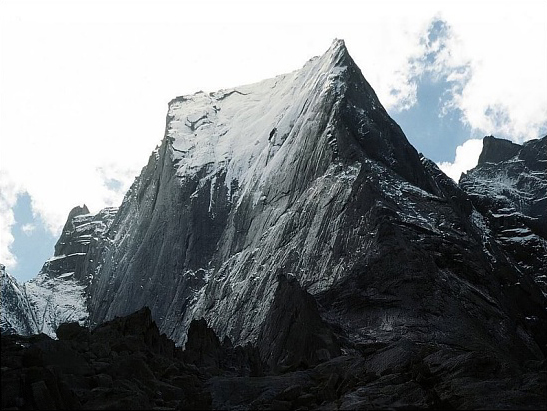
The north-east face of Piz Badile. The Cassin Route ascends the right-hand side of the face.

Cassin started mountaineering in around 1930 together with a group known as the Ragni di Lecco (spiders of Lecco). In 1934, he made the first ascent of the Piccolissima of the Tre Cime di Lavaredo. In 1935, after having repeated Emilio Comici's route on the north-west face of the Civetta, he climbed the south-eastern ridge of the Trieste Tower and, with Vittorio Ratti, established a new route on the north face of Cima Ovest di Lavaredo. In 1937, Cassin made his first climb on the granite of the Western Alps. Over the course of three days, 14–16 July, he made the first ascent of the north-east face of Piz Badile in the Val Bregaglia (Bergell), Switzerland, accompanied by Ratti and Gino Esposito after they teamed up with M. Molteni and G. Valsecchi, the latter two of whom died of exhaustion and exposure on the descent. This route is known today as the Cassin Route or the Via Cassin. He confirmed his extraordinary mountaineering skills 50 years later by climbing this route again at the age of 78.

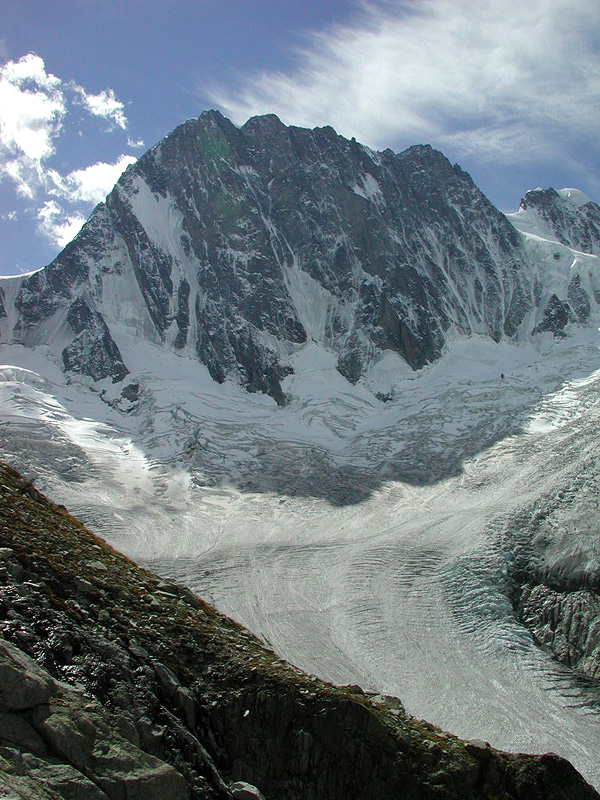
The north face of the Grandes Jorasses. The Walker Spur is the buttress (centre left) leading to the highest summit.

Perhaps his most celebrated first ascent was of the Walker Spur on the north face of the Grandes Jorasses in the Mont Blanc massif on 4–6 August 1938 with Esposito and Ugo Tizzoni. The alpine historian Helmut Dumler comments that this was "by then universally acknowledged as the finest alpine challenge." According to Claire Engel:

They knew nothing of the Chamonix district, had never been there before, and in a vague fashion asked the hut keeper where the Grandes Jorasses were. Even more vaguely, the man made a sweeping gesture and said: "somewhere there". He had not recognised the Italians and he thought their question was a joke. He was greatly surprised when, the next evening, he saw a bivouac light fairly high up the Walker spur; by the next night the light has crept up the face. On August 6th the party reached the summit ridge, where it was caught by a violent storm which compelled the men to bivouac on the way down.

— Claire Engel (1971) Mountaineering in the Alps, London: George Allen and Unwin, p. 231

In 1939, together with Tizzoni, Cassin made the first ascent of a steep line on the north face of the Aiguille de Leschaux.

Cassin was one of the leading mountaineers of the inter-war period. In all, Cassin made a total of 2,500 ascents, of which over 100 were first ascents.

== World War II ==
During World War II Cassin fought on the side of the partisans against the German occupiers. On 26 April 1945, when he was chief partisan, both he and Ratti (who had accompanied him on several first ascents) attempted to stop a group of German soldiers from escaping to the Valtellina and St Moritz, and Ratti was shot dead. Cassin was decorated for his actions in the partisan campaign during the years 1943–45.

== Expedition leader ==
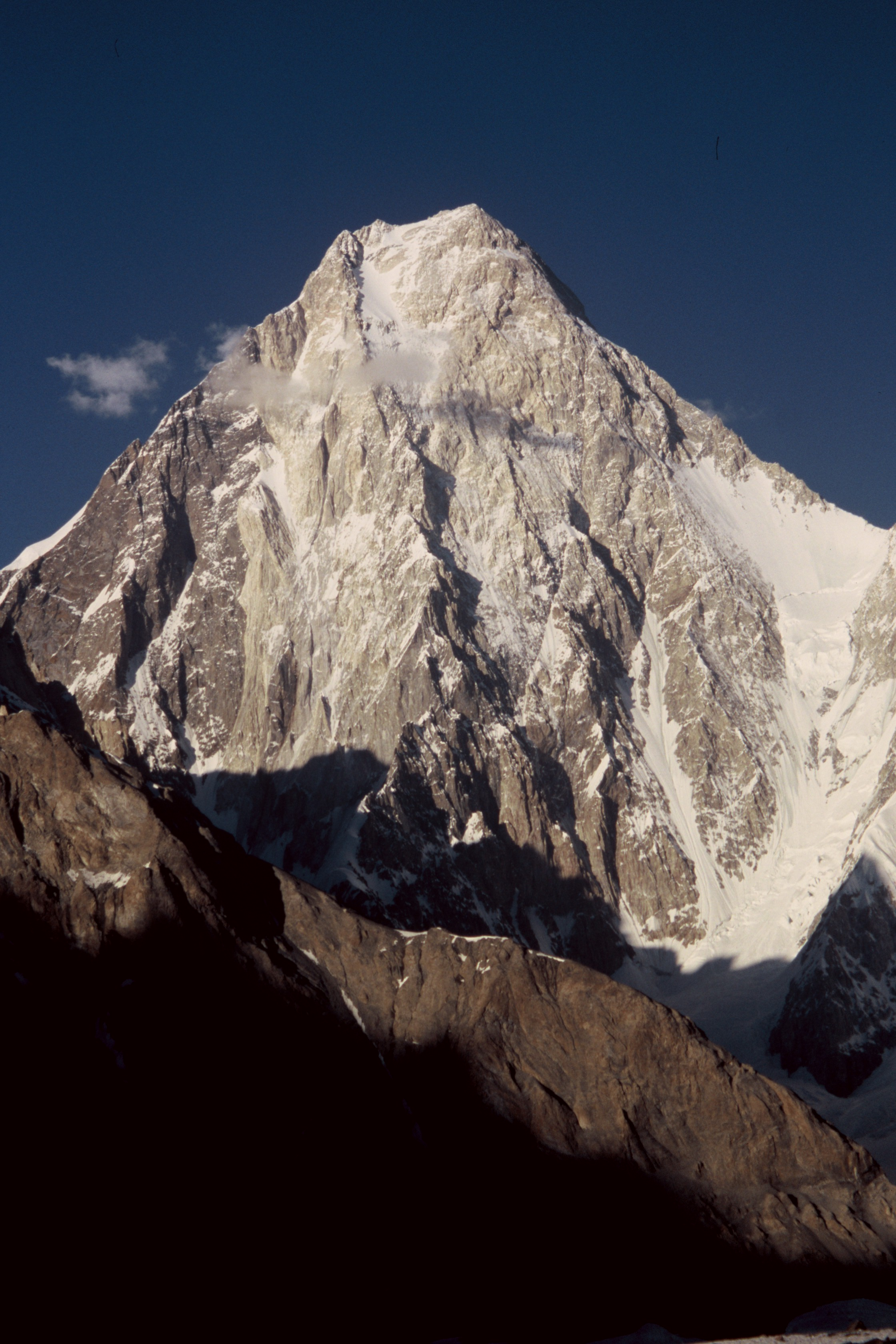
Gasherbrum IV

Cassin was supposed to have been on the Italian expedition that made the first ascent of K2 in the Karakoram in 1954, but Ardito Desio, the chief expedition leader for the Italian Alpine Club, preferred not to have Cassin participate. According to Cassin himself:

In 1952 he [Ardito Desio] did all he could to leave me at home—he felt threatened by my experience, even if in 1952 he took me to the Himalaya to sketch the route, organize the expedition and [figure out] the material to bring. Before we left for Kathmandu, he sent me to do a physical in Rome, where I was told I had some cardiac problems and had to stay home while the expedition members conquered the mountain.

Following this experience, Cassin concentrated on organizing and leading expeditions himself, including the first ascent of Gasherbrum IV in the Karakorum Range by Walter Bonatti and Carlo Mauri on 6 August 1958 and an expedition that climbed Jirishanca in the Andes in 1969.

In 1961, Cassin was both leader of and a successful ascensionist on the expedition that made the first ascent of the eponymous Cassin Ridge on Mount McKinley in Alaska, at that date the most technical route on the mountain. After this ascent, President Kennedy sent Cassin a telegram of congratulations and, had the Bay of Pigs crisis not intervened, he was scheduled to meet Cassin. In 1975, Cassin led an expedition to the then-unclimbed south face of Lhotse in the Himalaya, but this attempt was unsuccessful as a result of bad weather.

== Mountaineering equipment ==
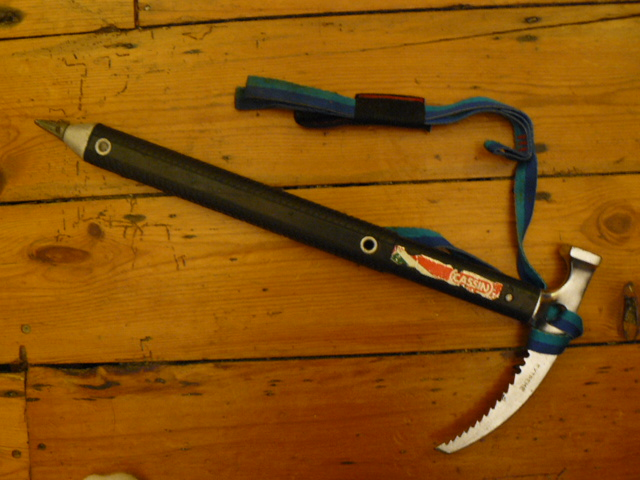
50-cm Cassin ice hammer

Cassin began designing and producing mountaineering equipment in Lecco in 1947 when he produced his first rock pitons. In 1948 he produced his first hammers; his first ice axes appeared in 1949; and 1950 saw the introduction of his carabiners. That same year he produced the "first eiderdown duvet jackets for non-European mountaineering expeditions", these going into production two years later. In 1958 he and his son produced their first harness prototype; this went into production two years later, the same year that he introduced titanium crampons.

In 1967 the company became a Limited Company and in the early 1980s it moved from Lecco to Valmadrera. In 1997 the CAMP company bought the Cassin trademark.

== 100th birthday celebrations ==
Cassin's 100th birthday fell on 2 January 2009. A retrospective book, entitled Riccardo Cassin: Cento volti di un grande alpinista ("Riccardo Cassin: One Hundred Faces of a Great Alpinist"), was produced to mark the occasion, containing one hundred testimonials from people associated with Cassin, including Édouard Frendo, Georges Livanos, John F. Kennedy, Reinhold Messner, Carlo Mauri, Walter Bonatti, Gianni Brera and Candido Cannavò.

Cassin died in Piano dei Resinelli, Lecco, on 6 August 2009, aged 100.

== Honours ==
- Cavaliere di Gran Croce Ordine al merito della Repubblica Italiana (Rome, 9 February 1999)
- Grand'Ufficiale dell'Ordine al merito della Repubblica Italiana (5 January 1980)

== Sources ==
- Riccardo Cassin, Alpi occidentali: Bianco, Cervino, Rosa, Grafica e Arte Bergamo, 1990, ISBN 8872011043
- Riccardo Cassin, Fifty Years of Alpinism, Diadem, 1980, ISBN 0898860601
- Alessandro Gogna, Laura Melesi and Daniele Redaelli, Riccardo Cassin: Cento volti di un grande alpinista, Bellavite Editore, 2008, ISBN 9788875110925
