= Marc-André Leclerc =

Canadian rock climber and alpinist (1992–2018)

Personal information
- Born: October 10, 1992 Nanaimo, British Columbia, Canada
- Died: March 5, 2018 (aged 25) Mendenhall Towers, Alaska, U.S.
- Occupations: Rock climber and alpinist

Climbing career
- Type of climber: Alpine climbing; ice climbing; mixed climbing; big wall climbing; traditional climbing; sport climbing; free solo climbing; competition climbing
- Highest grade: Redpoint: 5.13c (8a+)
- Known for: First winter solo of Torre Egger; First winter solo of Infinite Patience on Mount Robson
- Updated on 29 September 2023

Marc-André Leclerc (October 10, 1992 – March 5, 2018) was a Canadian rock climber, ice and mixed climber, and alpinist. He was known for his solo ascents–often in winter–of major ice and alpine climbing routes. In 2016, he completed the first winter solo ascents of both Torre Egger in Patagonia and of the Emperor Face of Mount Robson in British Columbia, Canada. In 2018, he died while climbing the Mendenhall Towers in Alaska.

In 2021, a documentary film called The Alpinist was released about Leclerc's life and climbs.

== Early life ==
Marc-André Leclerc was born on October 10, 1992, in Nanaimo, British Columbia, to Michelle Kuipers and Serge Leclerc. When he was eight years old, he was introduced to climbing when his grandfather bought him Chris Bonington's book, Quest for Adventure. At age nine, he had his first climbing experience in Coquitlam, British Columbia, on an indoor climbing wall inside a shopping mall. Later that year, he joined a gym in Abbotsford called Project Climbing. In 2005 his family moved to Agassiz, near the Cascade Range peaks, and Leclerc began teaching himself how to climb mountains. He would ride his bike out to Harrison Bluffs, a rock climbing area between Harrison Hot Springs and Agassiz, to climb and spend the night there alone.

When he was 15, his mother bought him a copy of Mountaineering: The Freedom of the Hills. The book inspired Marc-André Leclerc to join the British Columbia Mountaineering Club, through which he quickly made a name for himself in the mountaineering community. He began competing and quickly began winning age-group competitions. He won the Canadian Nationals in 2005.

== Climbing career ==
In 2015, Leclerc spent a lot of time in southern Argentine Patagonia. On February 21, he completed his first solo ascent of The Corkscrew (5.10d A1) on Cerro Torre. Leclerc wrote on his blog that soloing The Corkscrew "felt like a brief 'step into the future' so to speak…" in his efforts to fulfill his lifelong dream of becoming an explorer. Argentine climber and mountain guide Rolando Garibotti wrote that Leclerc's ascent of The Corkscrew was one of "earth-shifting proportions, by far the hardest route ever soloed on Cerro Torre and only the seventh solo overall." Later in 2015, Leclerc completed the second known free solo ascent of the Tomahawk / Exocet Link Up on Aguja Standhardt in Patagonia and then proceeded to climb the Torre Egger, completing his Torres solo trifecta.

In 2016, Leclerc completed the first solo ascent of Barry Blanchard's 2002 route, Infinite Patience (2,250m, VI, 5.9, WI5, M5), on Mt. Robson's Emperor Face. After completing the climb, he wrote on his blog that he "was intimidated by (the Emperor's) strong aura, but in the end, we became friends, and the King generously shared his wealth, leaving me a much richer person indeed."

== Death ==
On March 5, 2018, Marc-André Leclerc and his climbing partner, Ryan Johnson, reached the narrow summit via a new route on the north face of the Mendenhall Towers in Juneau, Alaska. The duo were expected to make it back to base camp by March 7 but never arrived, prompting Juneau Mountain Rescue to search for the missing climbers. The search was delayed for four days by poor weather conditions, and when the storm had finally passed, the search team discovered ropes at the bottom of the climbers' descent route. That suggests that the climbers were struck by an avalanche, falling rock, or cornice from above. Their bodies were never recovered, so they are presumed dead.

== Personal life ==
Leclerc had one older sister, Bridgid-Anne Dunning, and a younger brother, Kellyn Leclerc. He was raised in the Fraser Valley of British Columbia, Canada, and resided in Squamish with his girlfriend Brette Harrington, also a rock climber and alpinist. The pair met in Squamish in 2012, and in 2016, they established Hidden Dragon 5.12b (7b) on the "Chinese Puzzle Wall" across from Mount Slesse.

== Notable ascents ==
- 2013 − The Temptation of St Anthony, Squamish, First Free Ascent (5.13a)
- 2014 − Mount Slesse, Cascade Range – Triple Link-up of East Pillar Direct (5.10+), Navigator Wall (5.10+), Northeast Buttress (5.9+), Free Solo in 12 hours, 4 minutes
- 2015 − Reverse Torre Traverse, Patagonia – First Ascent (5.10a)
- 2015 − Directa de la Mentira – Cerro Torre North Face, Patagonia, First Ascent (5.10)
- 2015 − The Corkscrew – Cerro Torre, Patagonia, First Solo Ascent (5.10d)
- 2015 − Tomahawk/Exocet Link Up – Aguja Standhardt, Patagonia, – Onsight Free Solo (5.8)
- 2015 − Free Ascent of the Muir Wall on El Capitan (5.13c)
- 2016 − Mount Tuzo, Canadian Rockies – Northeast Face (M7+ WI6+R, 1,110 meters). First Ascent of the face
- 2016 − Mount Robson, Canadian Rockies – Infinite Patience (VI 5.9 M5 WI5, 2200m). First Solo Ascent
- 2016 − East Pillar – Torre Egger, Patagonia, First Solo Winter Ascent (5.10b)
- 2017 − Ha Ling Peak, Mount Lawrence Grassi − Cheesmond Express (5.10), Premature Ejaculation (5.10+), Northeast Face (5.7) Free Solos
- 2017 − Rim Wall, Canadian Rockies − Pinko (5.10). First Free Solo Ascent
- 2017 − Echo Canyon, Canadian Rockies − Tall Storey (5.11c) First Free Solo Ascent
- 2018 − Mount Slesse, Cascade Range – Northeast Buttress, Free Solo in winter, 2nd Winter Ascent, First Winter Free Ascent (5.9+)
- 2018 − The Theft, British Columbia, Canada. (M7 WI6+) Second Ascent
- 2018 − Jupiter Shift on Station-D in the Slesse Cirque
- 2018 − North face of the Main Tower, Mendenhall Towers. First Ascent

== See also ==
- Alex Honnold, American free soloist climber
