= Colin Haley =

American alpinist (born 1984)

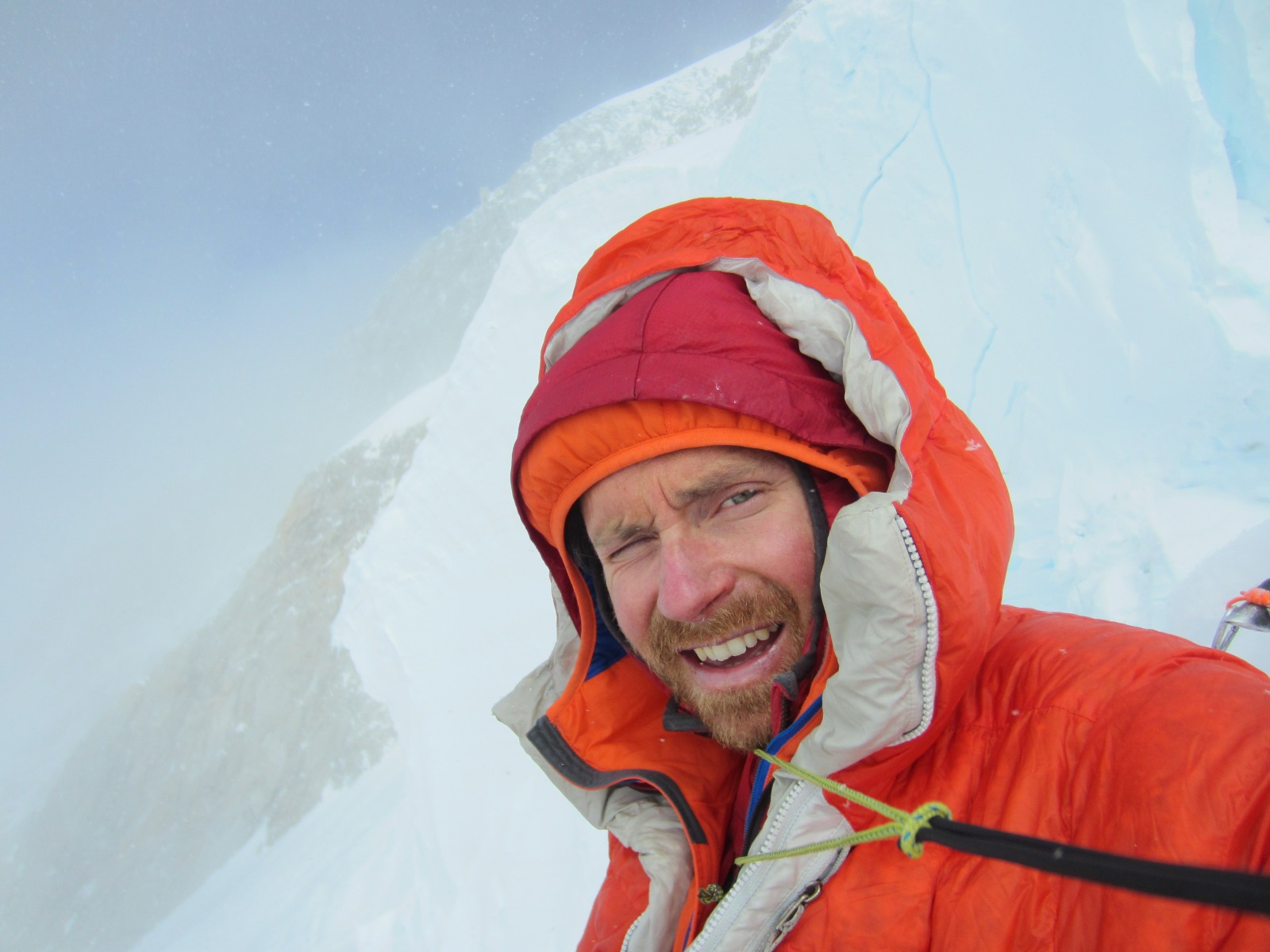
- Colin Haley self portrait during the first solo ascent of the Infinite Spur, Mount Foraker, Alaska.

Personal information
- Born: 2 September 1984 (age 41) Seattle, Washington, US
- Education: BSc. Geology University of Washington
- Website: "colinhaley.com"

Climbing career
- Type of climber: Alpinist
- First ascents: The Entropy Wall, Mount Moffit; Haley-House Route, Mount Robson; The Torre Traverse, Cerro Torre; Dracula, Mount Foraker; The Diablo Traverse, Devils Thumb; La Traversia del Oso Buda, Cerro Torre; Directa de la Mentira, Cerro Torre
- Known for: Fast ascents of technical, alpine routes.

Colin Haley (born 2 September 1984) is an American alpinist known for fast ascents of technical routes on mountains around the world. Haley is perhaps best known for his traverse of The Torres (Cerro Torre, Torre Egger, Punta Herron, and Aguja Standhardt), first with Rolando Garibotti in 2008, and subsequently with Alex Honnold - this time completing the traverse in under 24 hours.

== Personal life ==
Haley holds a BSc. in Geology from the University of Washington. He began studying engineering, but soon switched to geology so he could "have more free time in his future". Haley grew up in Seattle, Washington.

== First ascents ==
- In 2005, Haley completed a new route on Chiwawa Mountain called Intravenous (IV WI4+ M6) with Dave Burdick in his home state of Washington.
- Haley, along with Jed Brown, was the first to climb the Entropy Wall (2,300m, VI 5.9 A2 WI4+) on Mount Moffit, in 2006.
- In 2007, Haley and Kelly Cordes made the first complete ascent of Tiempos Perdidos, a route on the south face of Cerro Torre.
- Haley climbed a new route with Steve House on the Emperor Face of Mount Robson in 2007 which they named Haley-House.
- In January 2008, Haley made the first ascent of the Torre Traverse, with Rolando Garibotti, across the summits of Aguja Standhardt, Punta Herron, Torre Egger, and Cerro Torre.
- In 2008, Haley and Maxime Turgeon made the first ascent of Baintha Kabata, a 6,000+ meter peak on the Choktoi Glacier, in the Karakoram mountains of Pakistan.
- In 2010, Haley climbed a new route on Mount Foraker with Bjørn-Eivind Årtun which they named Dracula (M6R AI4+ A0, 10,400').
- In 2010, Haley and Mikey Schaefer made the first ascent of the Diablo Traverse, across the five major summits of Alaska’s Devil’s Thumb, from west to east.
- In 2011, Haley and Jorge Ackerman made the first complete ascent of the south face of Patagonia’s Aguja Standhardt, naming the route El Caracol.
- In 2013, Haley and Sarah Hart made the first ascent of the west face of Aguja Mojon Rojo, in Patagonia’s Chaltén Massif, naming the route El Zorro.
- In 2015, Haley and Marc-Andre Leclerc made the first ascent of the reverse Torre Traverse, across the summits of Cerro Torre, Torre Egger, Punta Herron, and Aguja Standhardt. They named the route La Traversia del Oso Buda.
- In 2015, Haley and Marc-Andre Leclerc made the second ascent of Cerro Torre’s route El Arca de los Vientos, and established a new direct variation up Cerro Torre’s north face, which they named Directa de la Mentira.
- In 2015, Haley and Dylan Johnson made the first ascent of the Heart of Darkness on the northeast face of Slesse Mountain.
- In 2025, Haley made the first winter solo of Cerro Torre.

== Solo ascents ==
Haley has made the first solo ascents of a number of difficult mountains, including Aguja Standhardt, Punta Herron, and Torre Egger in Patagonia, and Mount Waddington, Mount Combatant, and Mount Asperity in the British Columbia Coast Range.

Haley has also made the first solo ascents of the Infinite Spur on Mount Foraker, and the North Buttress of Mount Hunter, both in the Central Alaska Range.

== Other notable ascents ==
In 2016, Haley and Alex Honnold completed two big traverses in Patagonia in record time. First they made the second ascent of the Torre Traverse in 20 hours and 40 minutes. A week later they made the second ascent of the “Wave Effect” traverse in 17 hours and 7 minutes, taking a more direct route than the first ascent, and with both climbers climbing every pitch free.

== Alaska Range ascents ==
In 2007, Haley made the fifth ascent of The Denali Diamond (Alaska Grade 6: 5.9 A3, 7,800') with Mark Westman and the first winter ascent of Mount Huntington with Jed Brown. In 2009, he and Norwegian Bjørn-Eivind Årtun made the fourth ascent of the Grison-Tedeschi route on Mount Hunter.

Haley has also garnered much attention in the alpine climbing community for climbing difficult routes in the Alaska Range much faster than previously thought possible. In 2016, Haley climbed the Infinite Spur on Mount Foraker solo in 12 hours and 29 minutes "'schrund-to-summit" - less than half the time required by the next fastest climbing party in 2001. In 2017, Haley climbed and descended the North Buttress of Mount Hunter in 7 hours and 47 'schrund-to-summit. Haley set the speed record for climbing the Cassin Ridge on Denali in June 2018 in 8 hours and 7 minutes 'schrund-to-summit.
