= Aguja Bífida =

Mountain in Chile

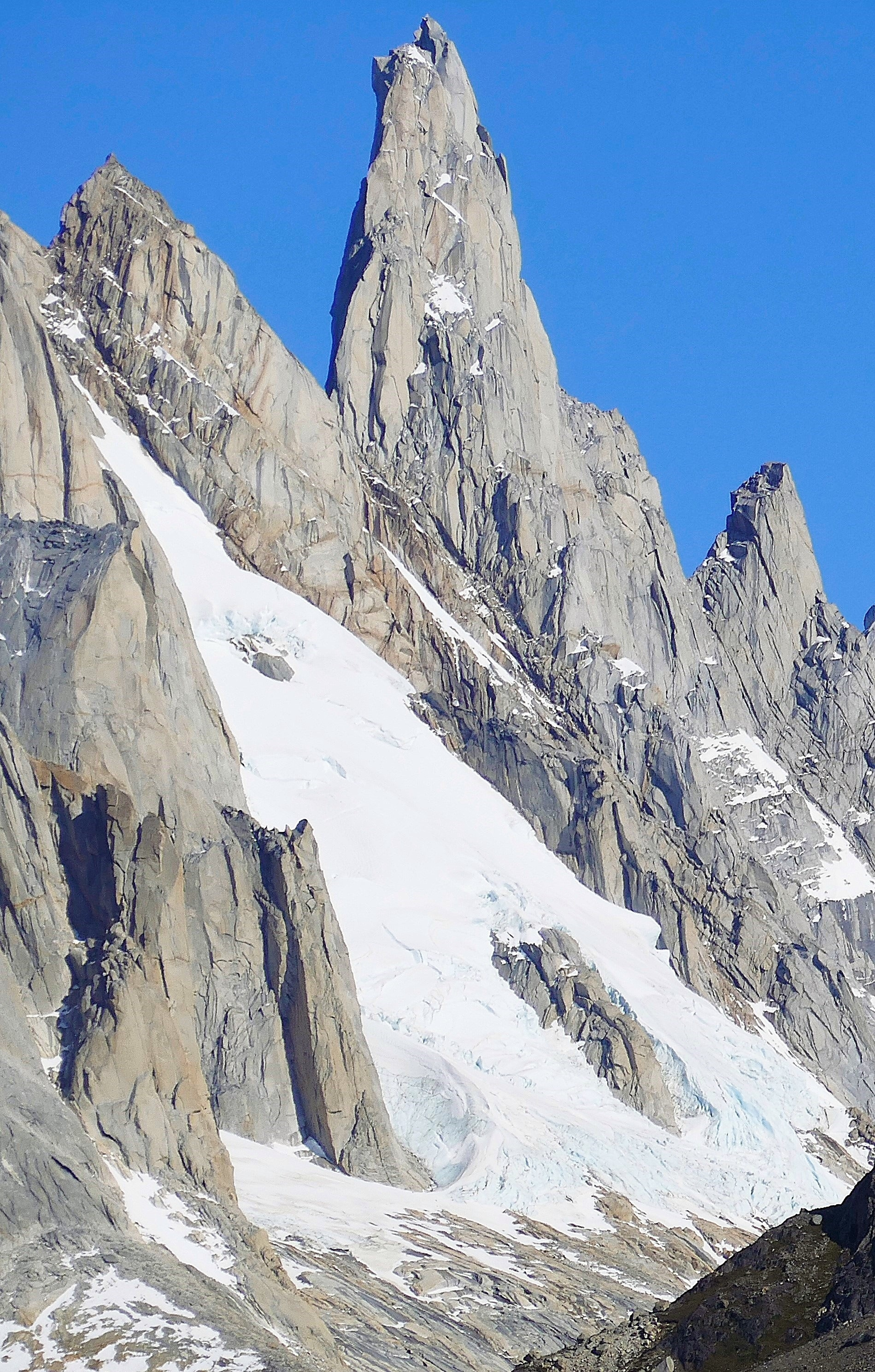
- Southeast aspect

Highest point
- Elevation: 2,394 m (7,854 ft)
- Prominence: 206 m (676 ft)
- Parent peak: Cerro Torre
- Coordinates: 49°16′49″S 73°05′54″W

Naming
- Etymology: Split Needle

Geography
- Location within Chile Location within South America Location within Southern Patagonia
- Interactive map of Aguja Bífida
- Country: Chile
- Province: Última Esperanza Province
- Protected area: Bernardo O'Higgins National Park
- Parent range: Andes

Geology
- Rock age: Cretaceous
- Rock type: Granite

Climbing
- First ascent: 1975, 1989

Aguja Bífida is a mountain in Chile located in the Chaltén Mountain Range Natural Site of Bernardo O'Higgins National Park in the Natales commune, Última Esperanza Province in the Magallanes and Chilean Antarctica Region. It is part of the Torre Range.

== Description ==
Aguja Bífida is a 2,394-meter-elevation (7,854-foot) summit in the Andes. The peak is located four kilometers (2.5 miles) west of Fitz Roy and 16 kilometers (10 miles) west-northwest of El Chaltén in Patagonia. It is set in Chaltén Mountain Range Natural Site which is part of Bernardo O'Higgins National Park. Topographic relief is significant as the summit rises 1,000 meters (3,280 ft) above the Torre Glacier in one kilometer (0.6 mile). Precipitation runoff from the peak's slopes drains to Viedma Lake. The first ascent of the lower south summit was made in 1975 by Paul von Känel and Hans Peter Trachsel. Peter Lüthi and Horacio Bresba were the first to successfully climb the higher north summit in 1989 via the north face. The descriptive toponym, which translates as Split Needle, was applied by Louis Lliboutry in 1952. The nearest higher peak is Cerro Standhardt, 0.73 kilometer (0.45 mile) to the south.

== Climbing history ==
Established climbing routes with first ascents:

- South Summit – 1975 – Paul von Känel, Hans Peter Trachsel
- North Summit – 1989 – Peter Lüthi, Horacio Bresba
- Hielo y Fuego (West Face) – 1996 – P. Cavagneto, R. Giovanetto, M. Motto, G. Predan, C. Ravaschietto
- Cogan (East Face) – 2007 – Crystal Davis-Robbins, Nico Gutierrez
- Northeast Spur – 2011 – Oriol Baró, Paula Alegre
- The Siren (East Face) – 2016 – Matt Burdekin, Tom Ripley

== Climate ==
According to the Köppen climate classification system, Aguja Bífida is located in a tundra climate zone with cold, snowy winters, and cool summers. Weather systems are forced upward by the mountains (orographic lift), causing moisture to drop in the form of rain and snow. This climate supports the Viedma Glacier to the west of the pillar and the Torre Glacier to the east. The months of November through February offer the most favorable weather for visiting or climbing this peak.

== See also ==
- Southern Patagonian Ice Field
