= Reel Rock Film Tour =

Annual climbing film festival

REEL ROCK
- Company type: Private
- Genre: Adventure sports documentary films
- Founder: Peter Mortimer and Josh Lowell
- Headquarters: Boulder, Colorado, United States
- Website: www.reelrocktour.com

Reel Rock is an annual traveling film festival and online subscription service that focuses on rock climbing and outdoor adventure films produced by Sender Films. The films are shown at screening events, spanning over 500 worldwide, and on Reel Rock Unlimited. 2023 will be the tour's 17th year. The festival's founders are Peter Mortimer and Josh Lowell.

== Content ==
Reel Rock screens climbing and adventure films to audiences around the world through a festival each year, and through their streaming app Reel Rock Unlimited. Each year, Reel Rock produces short films covering all climbing disciplines, including rock climbing, sport climbing, bouldering, ice climbing, mountaineering and free soloing. After organizing small tours for their film releases, founders and directors Josh Lowell and Peter Mortimer collaborated to create the first tour in 2006. The Reel Rock team regularly collaborates with the best athletes in climbing, including Alex Honnold, Tommy Caldwell, Margo Hayes, and more. The tour grew to over 800 screenings a year with 200,000+ attendees worldwide.

The tour partners with local outdoor equipment retailers, university outing clubs, and climbing gyms to organize screening events for each year's selections.
