= Rolando Garibotti =

Professional mountain climber and guide, author

Rolando Garibotti is an Argentine and American professional climber, writer, and mountain guide. He is from Bariloche, Argentina. These days he splits his time between the town of El Chaltén, Argentina, and the Dolomites in Italy.

== Notable climbs ==
- 2001 Infinite Spur, Mount Foraker, Alaska Range, Alaska, USA. Fifth ascent of route with Steve House, June 9–10, 2001 in 25 hours (to summit) with 20 hours for the descent.
- 2005 El Arca de los vientos, Cerro Torre, Patagonia. FA with Ermanno Salvaterra and Alessandro Beltrami, summiting November 13, 2005.
- 2008 Torre Traverse, (VI 5.11 A1 WI6 Mushroom Ice 6, 2,200 meters or 7,200 feet) Garibotti succeeded in accomplishing the first ascent of the traverse route with Colin Haley on January 21–24, 2008. This mountain group is situated in Patagonia, Argentina. The Torre Traverse climbs from north to south the skyline comprised by Aguja Standhardt, Punta Herron, Torre Egger, and Cerro Torre with approximately 2,200 meters (7,200 feet) of vertical gain. For maximum efficiency, Haley and Garibotti divided the leads based on their differing skills, with Haley leading the pure ice and rime pitches, and Garibotti leading the rock and rime-covered rock.

== Other ==
Rolando Garibotti has gathered over a dozen trail workers, climbers and park employees to rebuild some of the most degraded trails in Los Glaciares National Park, in Patagonia.

== Bibliography ==
- A mountain unveiled: a revealing analysis of Cerro Torre’s tallest tale, American Alpine Journal 2004.
- The Torre Traverse, Alpinist 25, 2008.

== See also ==
- List of climbers, alpinists and mountaineers
