= Monte Civetta =

Mountain in Italy

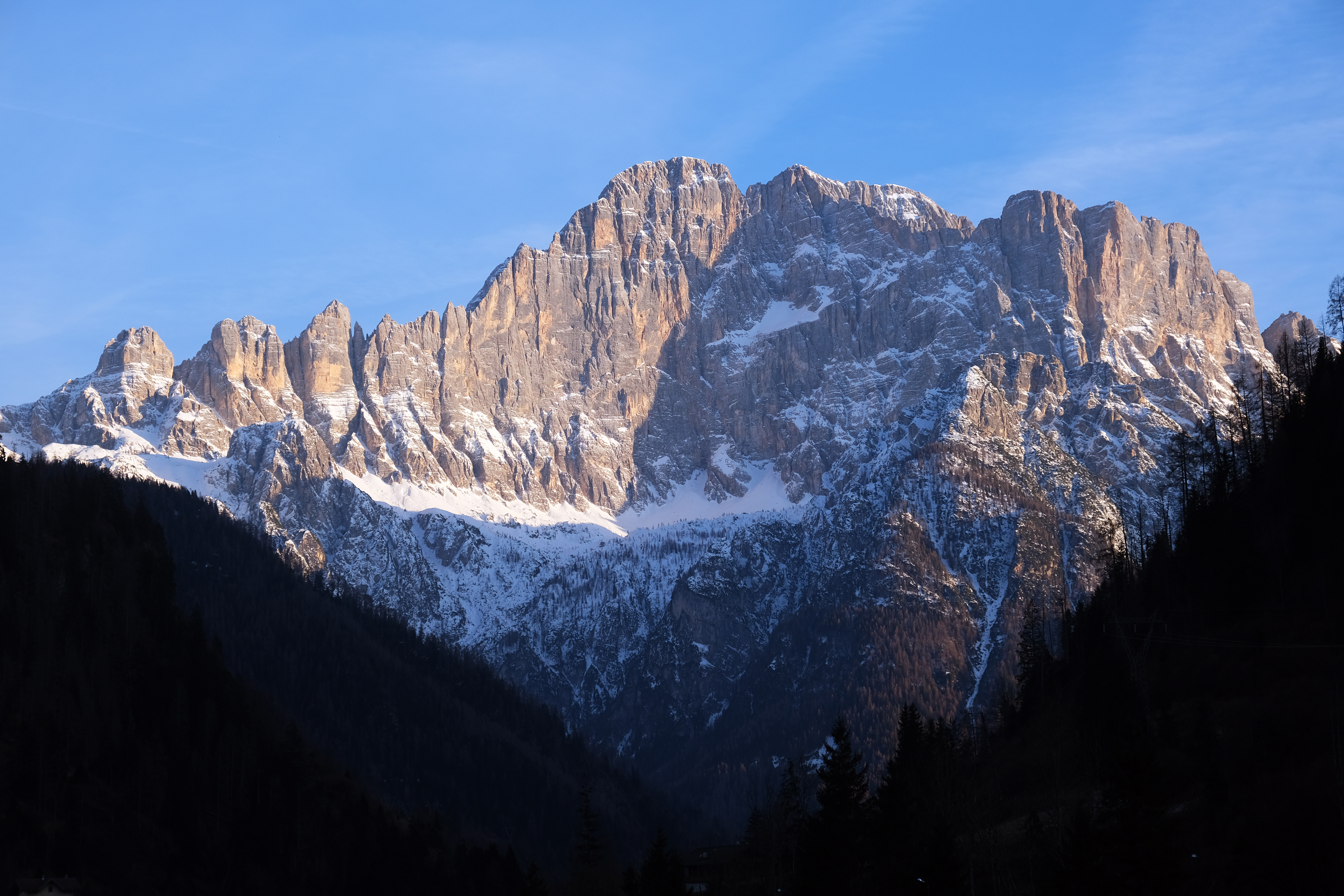

Highest point
- Elevation: 3,220 m (10,560 ft)
- Prominence: 1,454 m (4,770 ft)
- Listing: Alpine mountains above 3000 m
- Coordinates: 46°22′48″N 12°03′12″E

Geography
- Location within Italy
- Location: Belluno, Italy
- Parent range: Dolomites

Climbing
- First ascent: 1855

Monte Civetta (3,220 m) is a prominent and major mountain of the Dolomites, in the Province of Belluno in northern Italy. Its north-west face can be viewed from the Taibon Agordino valley, and is classed as one of the symbols of the Dolomites.

The mountain is thought to have been first climbed by Simeone di Silvestro in 1855, which, if true, makes it the first major Dolomite peak to be climbed. The north-western face, with its 1,000-metre-high cliff, was first climbed in 1925 by Emil Solleder and Gustl Lettenbauer. It is historically considered the first "sixth grade" in six-tier scale of alpinistic difficulties proposed by Willo Welzenbach (corresponding to 5.9). Thirty years later UIAA used this as a basis for its grading system.

The famed Georgian mountain climber Mikhail Khergiani died in a climbing accident on Monte Civetta in 1969.

In 2013, a large tower of the NW side collapsed from Cima Su Alto. Nobody was in the wall or the hiking route below at the time. In 2022, Reinhold Messner who had been climbing there in the 1990s described the spot, where the 400 m high, 50 m deep and 100 m wide tower broke off.
