= Army Mountaineering Association =

Organisation for mountaineering

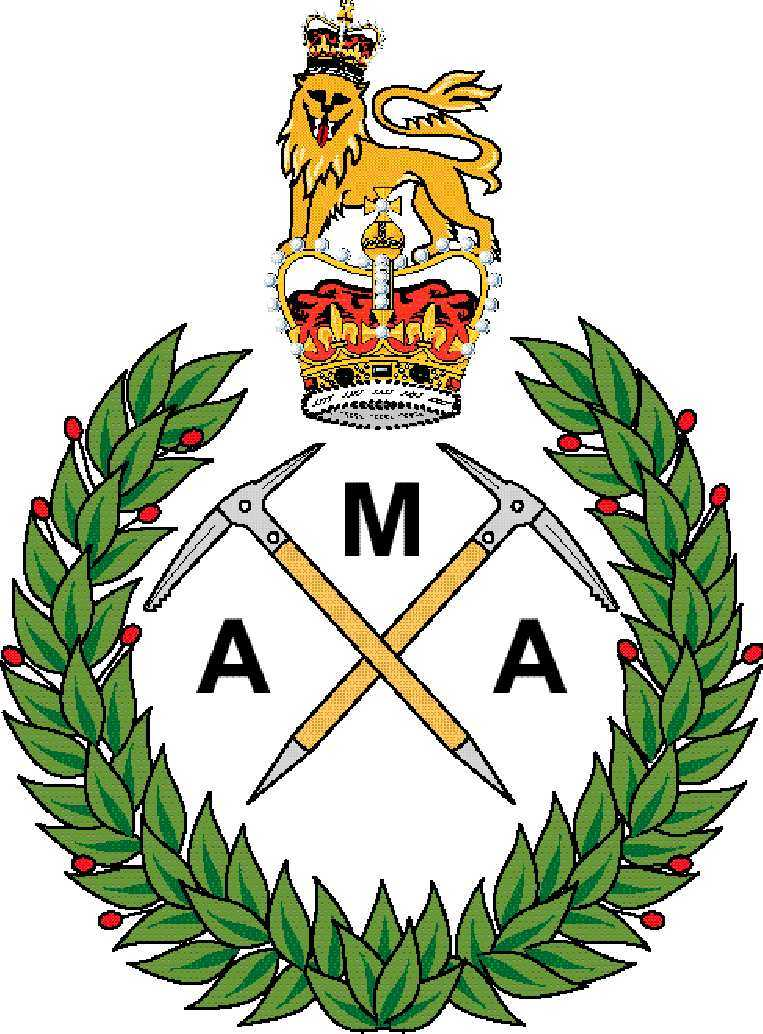
- Army Mountaineering Association – colour
- Abbreviation: AMA
- Formation: 1957
- Type: Charitable Association
- Headquarters: Joint Service Mountain Training Centre (Indefatigable), Llanfair PG, Anglesey, LL61 6NT.
- Members: circa 2,500
- President: Maj Gen David Southall
- Website: http://www.armymountaineer.org.uk/

The British Army Mountaineering Association (AMA) is the governing body for competition climbing and the representative body for mountaineering in the British Army. It is a member of the British Mountaineering Council and is the largest climbing club in the United Kingdom.

== History, Organisation and Status ==
The British Army were closely involved in many mountain climbing initiatives from the early 1900s, which included a strong involvement in the reconnaissance expeditions to Everest during the 1920s. During the Second World War, the British Army fielded a Division of Mountain Trained troops – the 52nd Lowland Division. The Army then mounted a number of successful expeditions around the world – Lieutenant John Hunt's trip to climb K36 (Saltoro Kangri) in Baltistan inspired more expeditions. Hunt would subsequently become the successful leader of the 1953 British Mount Everest expedition. With the success of that expedition a mountaineering club was thus proposed and fronted by Colonel Gerry Finch, Major Hugh Robertson and Second Lieutenant Chris Bonington. Field Marshall Sir Gerald Templer was the first President and John Hunt, Baron Hunt was first Vice-President, of the Army Mountaineering Association.

The AMA was formed on 24 May 1957. It has charitable status and its constitution states that it exists 'To promote military efficiency by encouraging mountaineering in the Army'. Membership is open to serving members of the British Army and the Army Reserve. Since its inception the AMA has been involved in delivering and supporting mountaineering activity for its members. The association is currently engaged in two major areas of activity which are: mountaineering and climbing competitions each of which is governed separately.

The business of the AMA is managed by an executive committee who are elected annually. Its current president is Major General David Southall

== Mountaineering ==
The AMA organises mountaineering training, including Alpine meets, and expeditions for its members and encourages them to organise their own expeditions. It makes grants from the AMA 'Memorial Fund' to help support individuals wishing to take part in significant mountaineering expeditions. Since its inception the AMA has organised or provided significant support to a number of major expedition to the Greater Ranges including:

- 1959 – Malubiting East (First Ascent)
- 1960 – Annapurna II (First Ascent) (Joint Service)
- 1962 – Khunyang Chhish (also known as Khinyang Chhish)
- 1967 - West Greenland - Kangerlussuatsiaq Fjord
- 1968 - East Greenland - Kristians Glacier
- 1969 – Tirich Mir
- 1969 - North Greenland - Peary Land (Joint Service)(Army led)
- 1970 – Annapurna
- 1971 - AMA West Greenland (Evighedsfjord).
- 1972 – Axel Heiberg Island
- 1972 - Patagonia - Northern Patagonian Ice Field (Chile) - (Joint Services)(Army led) The Ministry of Defence produced a film called 'The Patagonian Expedition 1972/73'.
- 1973 - Himachal Pradesh Expedition
- 1974 – Lamjung Himal
- 1975 – Nuptse (Joint British Army/Royal Nepalese Army expedition)
- 1976 – Mount Everest – South Col (Joint British Army/Royal Nepalese Army expedition). The Army Department produced a 16mm film of the expedition called 'Soldiers on Everest'. This expedition included the first high altitude Himalayan rescue on Everest, taking 5 days to bring Brummie Stokes, who was badly frostbitten and snow blind and Bronco Lane, who was badly frostbitten, down from over 28,000 feet to base camp.
- 1978 - East Greenland - Scoresby Sound area.
- 1980 - Womens Services (Army) Pyrenees Expedition. This was the first all army women's expedition sponsored by the AMA.
- 1980 – Api
- 1982 - Ngadi Chuli (Peak 29)
- 1984 - East Kulu Himal, India (Papsura (6,451m.) and Dharmsura (6,445m.).
- 1985 – Kirat Chuli (Joint British Army/Royal Nepalese Army expedition)
- 1986 - Alpamayo
- 1987 – Shishapangma (Xixabangma) (Joint AMA / Civilian expedition)
- 1987 – Saser Kangri (First Ascent of Saser Kangri IV)
- 1988 – Mount Everest – West Ridge
- 1989 - East Greenland - Liverpool Land
- 1990 – Gyachung Kang
- 1992 – Annapurna IV
- 1992 – Mount Everest – West Ridge
- 1994 – Mount Foraker – Archangel Ridge (Second Ascent)
- 1996 – Gasherbrum I (Hidden Peak)
- 2000 – Kangchenjunga (Joint Service) – (Royal Navy lead)
- 2004 – Makalu (Joint Service – RAF Lead)
- 2006 – Mount Everest – West Ridge
- 2007 – Shishapangma
- 2008 – Makalu (Joint Service – RAF Lead)
- 2012 – Antarctica – Graham Land (Joint Service – British Army Lead)
- 2015 – Mount Everest – North Ridge (Received AMA Support)
- 2017 – Putha Hiunchuli – Normal Route

== Competitions ==
The AMA organises bouldering and other indoor competition climbing events for the Army. The first Army-level indoor competition lead climbing event was organised at Bristol by Colonel Paul John Edwards on 28 April 1995. The AMA continues to organise indoor climbing competitions and now competes annually against the Royal Navy and RAF, as well as contributing members to the Combined Services Sport Climbing team, which competes regularly against military sport climbers from other countries.

== Prominent AMA members ==
The following are current/former presidents, vice-presidents or Chairman of the AMA.

- Field Marshal Sir Gerald Templer KG, GCB, GCMG, KBE, DSO (President) (Loyal Regiment (North Lancashire))
- Brigadier John Hunt, Baron Hunt KG, CBE, DSO, PC (vice-president) (King's Royal Rifle Corps)
- Sir Chris Bonington CVO, CBE, DL (Honorary Vice-president) (Royal Tank Regiment)
- Lieutenant Colonel Tony Streather OBE (Honorary President) (Gloucestershire Regiment)

UIAGM Mountain Guides: The following AMA members have become members of the British Association of Mountain Guides

- Major Mac McKay (Royal Army Physical Training Corps)
- Captain Stuart McDonald (Royal Engineers) (Everest Summiteer).
- Warrant Officer Class 1 Paul Chiddle (Royal Army Physical Training Corps)
- Captain Tania Noakes (Royal Signals)

Other notable AMA Members:

- Brigadier Gerry Finch, one of the original founders of the AMA along with Major Hugh Robertson and Chris Bonington. While in India, pre World War II he had explored extensively in the Himalayas, including recceing Tirich Mir, climbed by the AMA in 1969.
- Lieutenant Colonel Charles Wylie OBE (Ghurkas) – Organising Secretary to the 1953 British Mount Everest expedition.
- Lieutenant Colonel J. O. M. Roberts MVO, MBE, MC (Ghurkas) – First Ascents of Annapurna II – 1960, Mera Peak – 20 May 1953 and Putha Hiunchuli – 11 November 1952.
- Colonel Henry Day (Royal Engineers) – Member of the Tirich Mir expedition (1969), made the 2nd ascent (and first British ascent) of Annapurna 1970,. He was a member of the 1973 Himachal Pradesh expedition, and the Everest expedition (1976). He led an RE expedition to Trisul II (1978) and to the Da Xue Shan mountains (1981). He led the climbers attempting to climb the east face of Xixabangma (1987) and in 2008 organised a climbing expedition to the Georgian Caucasus.
- Colonel Meryon Bridges, OBE, Royal Engineers was a member of the 1971 AMA Greenland (Evighedsfjord) and the 1972 AMA Alex Heiberg expeditions and then took part in eight Himalayan expeditions between 1973 and 1996, including Everest (1976), Api (1980), Everest (1992), and then led the successful Gasherbrum I (1996) expedition.
- Lieutenant Colonel Jon W A Fleming OBE Parachute Regiment (United Kingdom) – Deputy leader of Greenland expeditions 1967 & 1968, Leader of Tirich Mir Expedition 1969, Leader of Himachal Pradesh Expedition 1973 & Leader of Nuptse Expedition 1975, Organising Secretary Everest Expedition 1976, Co-author Soldiers on Everest.
- Lieutenant Colonel A J Muston, RAOC, MBE, FRGS. Vice President AMA, President, The Arctic Club (1995). Leader or member of 6 Army expeditions to Greenland in 1971, 1979, 1980, 1984, 1988, and 1989; leader Axel Heiberg, Canada expedition in 1972; and to the Himalayas in 1973 (Himachal Pradesh), 1975 (Nuptse), 1976 (Everest) and 1982 (West Nepal) with many other expeditions after leaving service in 1989 including an expedition to East Greenland in 2011.
- Major Sir Crispin Agnew of Lochnaw Bt, RHF, FRGS (1969) – Member RN Expedition to Greenland 1966, Leader Army East Greenland 1968, Member Joint Services Elephant Island Expedition 1970/71, Leader Joint Services Chilean Patagonia Expedition 1972/73, Member Nuptse Expedition 1975, Member Everest Expedition 1976, Leader Army Api Expedition 1980.
- Major Timothy King, RAOC. AMA Executive Committee member 1980 to 1989, Chair 1989 to 1992 and Chair Joint Services Mountaineering Committee. Started “The Army Mountaineer”, the Journal of the AMA. Leader of AMA Expeditions to Liverpool Land (1989); Sondestrom Fiord (1992); member of the Axel Heiberg Island (1972), Nuptse (1975), Everest (1976), and NE Greenland (1980) expeditions.
- Major Bronco Lane MM, BEM (Special Air Service) – Ascent of Everest, 16 May 1976
- John Stokes (mountaineer) (Brummy Stokes), MBE, BEM (Special Air Service) – Ascent of Everest, 16 May 1976 with Bronco Lane
- Major Mike Smith (Royal Electrical and Mechanical Engineers) – UK veteran sport climbing champion 2009
