= Yuji Miura =

Japanese ski mountaineer and trail runner

Medal record

Men's ski mountaineering

Representing Japan

Asian Championships
Gold medal – first place	2012 Asian Championship	Individual

Yuji Miura (三浦裕司, Miura Yūji) is a Japanese ski mountaineer and trail runner.

Miura teaches at the Hokkaido Sapporo Asahigaoka High School, Hokkaido.

== Selected results (ski mountaineering) ==
- 2010:
  - 1st, Gangwon Provincial Governor's Cup, Yongpyong Ski Resort/Balwangsan
  - 2nd, Tsugaike race Nagano Prefecture
- 2012:
  - 1st, Asian Championship, individual
