= Yoshiyuki Sato =

Japanese ski mountaineer (born 1975)

Personal information
- Full name: 佐藤佳幸 (Sato Yoshiyuki)
- Born: May 26, 1975 (age 51) Gunma, Japan

Sport
- Sport: Skiing
Medal record
Men's ski mountaineering
Representing Japan
Asian Championships
Gold medal – first place	2009 Jilin	Individual
Gold medal – first place	2009 Jilin	Relay
Silver medal – second place	2007 Nagano	Individual
Bronze medal – third place	2009 Jilin	Vertical race

Yoshiyuki Sato (佐藤佳幸, Satō Yoshiyuki; born May 26, 1975) is a Japanese ski mountaineer.

Sato was born in Gunma. He started ski mountaineering in 2000 and participated in his first race in 2004. He lives in Tokyo.

== Selected results ==
- 2007:
  - 2nd, Asian Championship, individual
- 2009:
  - 1st, Asian Championship, individual
  - 1st, Asian Championship, relay (mixed team), together with Mase Chigaya, Suzuki Keiichiro and Hiraide Kazuya
  - 3rd, Asian Championship, vertical race
