= Jur =

Jur or JUR may refer to:

- Jur, Iran, a village in Isfahan Province, Iran
- Jur River, in South Sudan
- Jurien Bay Airport (IATA: JUR), in Western Australia
- Jurong East MRT station (MRT station abbreviation), Singapore

== Languages ==
- Jur language (ISO 639-3: lwo), spoken in South Sudan
- Jurúna language (ISO 639-3: jur), spoken in Brazil

== People ==
- Jur Hronec (1881–1959), Slovak mathematician
- Jur Vrieling (born 1969), Dutch show jumping rider
- Barthélemy de Jur (c. 1080–1158), French bishop

== See also ==
- Jurjur Khona Sar, also known as Jur Jur, a mountain in Pakistan
