= 1976 British and Nepalese Army Expedition to Everest =

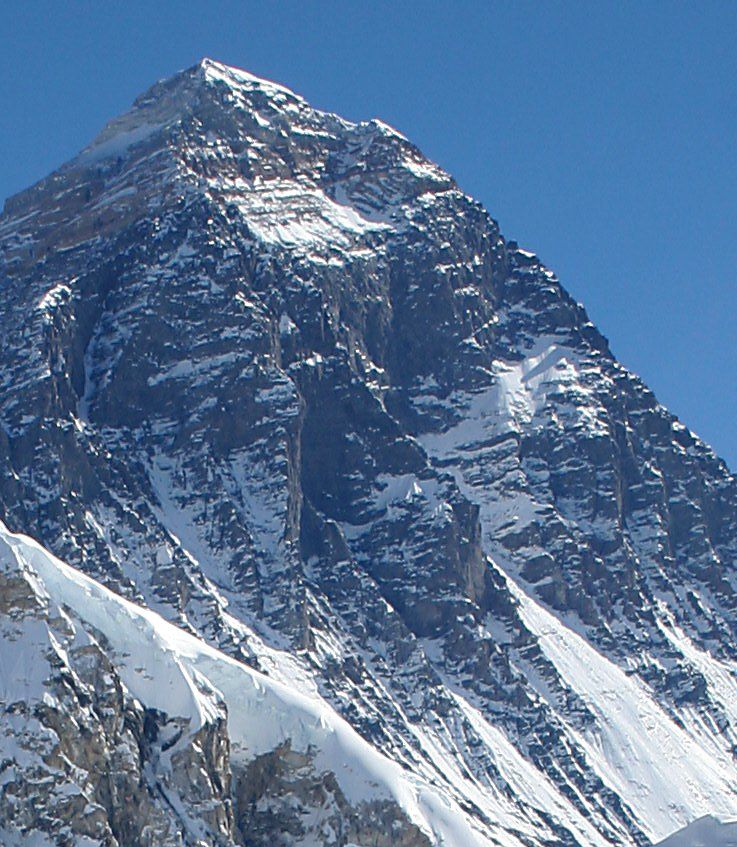
Mount Everest's, upper Southwest face

The 1976 British and Nepalese Army Expedition to Everest resulted in the successful summit of Mount Everest via its South Face on 16 May. This was the second time this had been achieved – less than a year previously, the 1975 British Mount Everest Southwest Face expedition being the first up the same route. The expedition by the British Army and Royal Nepalese Army was under the command of Tony Streather, and the summiteers were Special Air Service soldiers Bronco Lane and Brummie Stokes. The Army Department produced a 16mm film of the expedition called 'Soldiers on Everest'.

== Background ==
The British Army were closely involved in many mountain climbing initiatives from the early 1900s, which included a strong involvement in the reconnaissance expeditions to Everest during the 1920s. During the Second World War, the British Army fielded a Division of Mountain Trained troops – the 52nd Lowland Division. The Army then mounted a number of successful expeditions around the world – Lieutenant John Hunt's trip to climb K36 (Saltoro Kangri) in Baltistan inspired more expeditions. Hunt would subsequently become the successful leader of the 1953 British Mount Everest expedition.

With the success of that expedition a mountaineering club was thus proposed and fronted by Colonel Gerry Finch, Major Hugh Robertson and Second Lieutenant Chris Bonington. On 24 May 1957 the Army Mountaineering Association was formed as a charitable status. Its constitution states that it exists 'To promote military efficiency by encouraging mountaineering in the Army'. Another army officer, Tony Streather ascended the third highest mountain in the world Kangchenjunga in 1955, then Tirich Mir five years later. His legendary parts played on K2 and Haramosh gave him a superb reputation in mountaineering. More army officers led the way – Major Jon Fleming had led AMA expeditions to Tirich Mir in 1969, Lahul in 73 and Nuptse three years later.

Two SAS men Brummie Stokes and Bronco Lane took part in the 1975 expedition to the neighbouring peak of Nuptse, which is 25,850 feet high to Everest's 29,030 feet. Four men had died on that particular trip, but Stokes and Lane were undeterred about climbing Everest itself. The following year both were given leave from the SAS to attempt an Army ascent of Everest. The expedition was to be a joint British-Nepalese Army operation under the command of Streather.

== Expedition ==
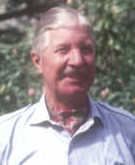
Tony Steather commander of the 1976 army expedition

During the 200 mile walk from Kathmandu to Everest base camp with the Army Mountaineering Association two men emerged as clear summiters – Stokes and Lane. Their combined endurance had impressed all even though they were not rock climbing experts.

On May 14, Stokes and Lane were established at Camp 6, at 27,000 feet, ahead of the planned ascent of Everest's south-west face the following morning. That night, however, a severe storm made movement impossible. There were concerns that a prolonged stay at such high altitudes might weaken the pair, but they were keen to press on. There's only one way we're going, Stokes radioed, and it's not down.

Two days later they set off early on the morning and by mid-afternoon they had reached the summit, where they collapsed in a shattered state. After taking a few pictures on the summit they set about their descent – the danger was far from over; at 28,000 feet on the way down, the route became impassable owing to white-out weather conditions and both were forced to abandon their descent.

As their oxygen supplies began to run perilously low, they huddled down to make an improvised camp for the night. The mercury dropped to around minus 20 degrees Celsius, made colder by the wind chill. They scraped a hole in the snow near the South Summit for the night and they had to hit each other to keep themselves awake and in so doing kept themselves alive next morning. Stokes tried and failed to attach an oxygen bottle to his face-mask. Lane had to remove his glove to attach the bottle but after an hour his hand was frozen. After the night in the open both men's feet were badly frostbitten.

As they struggled from their bivouac site, they were met by the second pair to try for the summit, John Scott and Pat Gunson both from the Parachute Regiment – who had expected to find them dead. They were overjoyed to see them and the message was relayed to Streather who was relieved. Having dosed the severely weakened pair with oxygen – and hot soup – Scott and Gunson scrapped their own ascent and began to descend with them. All four safely reached base camp five days later. This was the first high altitude Himalayan rescue on Everest, taking 5 days to bring Brummie Stokes and Bronco Lane down from over 28,000 feet to base camp.

== Aftermath ==
With the summit attained complete the expedition ended – Stokes and Lane were evacuated home. Stokes left the mountain three-and-a-half stone lighter. Back home in England both were awarded the British Empire Medal; doctors attempted to save the men's toes but the condition of their feet deteriorated in the summer heat. Stokes lost all his toes and part of each foot to frostbite. Lane lost his toes too as well as the thumb and top halves of his fingers on his right hand. Despite losing all his toes to frostbite, Stokes returned to tackle Everest a further three times, while Lane continued mountaineering in the Canadian Rockies in 1978-9 and Mount Kenya in 1983.
