= Gwak Mi-hee =

South Korean mountain biker and skier (born 1974)

Personal information
- Born: May 19, 1974 (age 52) Yesan County, South Korea

Sport
- Sport: Skiing
Medal record
Women's ski mountaineering
Representing South Korea
Asian Championships
Gold medal – first place	2007 Nagano	Individual
Gold medal – first place	2009 Jilin	Individual
Gold medal – first place	2009 Jilin	Vertical race
Gold medal – first place	2012 Gangwon	Individual
Bronze medal – third place	2009 Jilin	Relay

- Gwak Mi-hee
- Hangul: 곽미희
- RR: Gwak Mihui
- MR: Kwak Mihŭi

Gwak Mi-hee (Korean: 곽미희; born May 10, 1974) is a South Korean cross-country mountain biker and ski mountaineer, who has won all individual races of all Asian Championships of Ski Mountaineering since the first edition.

Gwak was born in Yesan, and lives in Seoul. She started cycling in 1997, and became a member of the national team in 2001.

== Selected results ==
=== Ski mountaineering ===
- 2007:
  - 1st: Asian Championship, individual
- 2009:
  - 1st: Asian Championship, individual
  - 1st: Asian Championship, vertical race
  - 3rd: Asian Championship, relay (mixed teams), together with Park Jong-il
- 2012:
  - 1st: Asian Championship, individual

=== Mountain biking ===
- 2002:
  - 6th, Asian Games, women's cross-country
