= Minehiro Yokoyama =

Japanese ski mountaineer (born 1971)

Personal information
- Full name: 横山峰弘 (Yokoyama Minehiro)
- Born: June 29, 1971 (age 55)

Sport
- Sport: Skiing
Medal record
Men's ski mountaineering
Representing Japan
Asian Championships
Bronze medal – third place	2007 Asian Championship	Individual

Minehiro Yokoyama (横山峰弘, Yokoyama Minehiro; born June 29, 1971) is a Japanese ski mountaineer.

Yokoyama finished third at the 2007 Asian Championship of Ski Mountaineering and won Bronze.
