= Seiji Yamada =

Japanese ski mountaineer (born 1966)

Personal information
- Full name: 山田 誠司 (Yamada Seiji)
- Born: March 19, 1966 (age 60)

Sport
- Sport: Skiing
Medal record
Men's ski mountaineering
Representing Japan
Asian Championships
Gold medal – first place	2007 Nagano	Individual

Seiji Yamada (山田 誠司, Yamada Seiji; born March 19, 1966) is a Japanese ski mountaineer.

Yamada won the first Asian championship of ski mountaineering in 2007. Only the New Zealander Grant Guise topped his time, but did not count in the continental championship ranking because he was not an Asian country national.
