= Kazuya Hiraide =

Japanese mountain climber and skier (1979–2024)

Personal information
- Full name: 平出和也 (Hiraide Kazuya)
- Born: May 25, 1979 Fujimi, Japan
- Died: July 27, 2024 (aged 45) K2

Sport
- Sport: Skiing
Medal record
Ski mountaineering
Gold medal – first place	2009 Asian Championship	Relay

Kazuya Hiraide (平出和也, Hiraide Kazuya; May 25, 1979 – July 27, 2024) was a Japanese ski mountaineer, Alpine climber, and professional mountain cameraman. Hiraide won the Piolet d'Or mountaineering award on four occasions.

== Climbing career ==
Hiraide became a serious mountain climber after joining a mountaineering club at his university. In 2001, he reached the eastern summit of Kula Kangri (7,381m) in Tibet. His list of accomplishments includes first ascents, reaching summits without oxygen, and skiing from mountain peaks. In 2009, he scaled the previously unclimbed southeastern wall of Kamet (7,756m) in India, and with his climbing partner Kei Taniguchi, became the first Japanese to receive the 17th Piolet d'Or Award, the "Academy Award" of mountaineering. He also won three other Piolet d'Or Awards with climbing partner Kenro Nakajima for their first ascent on an uncharted route with Shispare in 2017, Rakaposhi in 2019 and Terich Mir in 2023. He also received the Japan Sports Award, sponsored by The Yomiuri Shimbun, in 2001 and 2009.

On July 28, 2024, it was reported that Hiraide died from in fall while attempting an ascent of the western face of K2 together with Kenro Nakajima. Two figures were spotted by a rescue helicopter which failed to land next to them and described them as "motionless".

In 2024, Hiraide's wife Joko Hiraide accepted his 2023 posthumous Piolet d'Or award on his behalf.

== Selected results ==
=== Ski mountaineering ===
- 2009:
  - 1st, Asian Championship, relay (mixed team), together with Mase Chigaya, Sato Yoshiyuki and Suzuki Keiichiro
  - 4th, Asian Championship, individual
  - 5th, Asian Championship, vertical race

=== Mountain climbing ===
- 2001
  - Kula Kangri East Peak (7381m), Pakistan, first ascent
  - Cho Oyu (8201m) China, summit, ski down from top
- 2003
  - Kunyang Chhish (7852m), Pakistan, first try, west face
- 2004
  - Golden Peak (7027m), Pakistan, new route, north west ridge, summit
  - Lila Peak (6200m), Pakistan, new route, east face, summit
  - Kunlun Mustag (6355m), China, new route, summit
- 2005
  - Mustag Ata (7564m), China, second ascent, east ridge, summit, ski down to west side
  - Shivling (6543m), India, new route, north face to west face, summit
- 2007
  - Shispare (7611m), Pakistan, first try, north east face
- 2008
  - Gasherbrum II (8035m), Pakistan, summit
  - Broad Peak (8047), Pakistan, summit
  - Kamet (7756m), India, new route, south east face, summit
- 2009
  - Gasherbrum I (8068m), Pakistan, Summit
  - Gaurishankar (7134m), China, first try, east face
- 2010
  - Ama Dablam (6856m), Nepal, first try, north west face
- 2011
  - Everest (8848m), Nepal, south side, summit
  - Naimonanyi (7694m), China, new route, south west ridge, summit, south peak (7200m), first ascent, first try, south east face
- 2012
  - Khan Tengri (7010m), Kazakh, north side, summit
  - Shispare (7611m), Pakistan, first try, south west face
- 2013
  - Everest (8848m), Nepal, summit
  - Diran (7266m), Pakistan, west ridge, summit
  - Shispare (7611m), Pakistan, first try, south west face
- 2014
  - Everest (8848m), Nepal, south side
  - Hkakabo Razi (5881m), Myanmar, first try, north ridge
- 2015
  - Everest (8848m), China, north side
  - Api (7132m), Nepal, north side, summit
- 2016
  - Everest (8848m), China, north side, summit
- 2017
  - Shispare (7611m), Pakistan, new route, north east face
- 2019
  - Rakaposhi (7788m), Pakistan, new route, south face
- 2023
  - Tirich Mir (7708m), Pakistan, new route, north face

== Awards ==
- 2008: Piolet d'Or, together with Kei Taniguchi (谷口ケイ, Taniguchi Kei) for the first ascent of the South-West face of Kamet (7756m, India) in alpine style
- 2017: The 26th Piolet d'Or Award and The 12th Piolet d'Or Asia Award, together with Kenro Nakajima for the first ascent of the North-East face of Shispare (7611m, Pakistan) in alpine style.
- 2019: The 28th Piolet d'Or Award, together with Kenro Nakajima for the first ascent of the south face of Rakaposhi (7788m, Pakistan) in alpine style.
- 2024: The 32nd Piolet d'Or Award, together with Kenro Nakajima for the first ascent of Secret Line on the north face of Terich Mir (7708m, Pakistan).
