= 2012 Asian Championship of Ski Mountaineering =

The 2012 Asian Championship of Ski Mountaineering (Korean: 아시아 산악스키 선수권대회) was the third edition of an Asian Championship of Ski Mountaineering, and the second official sanctioned by the International Ski Mountaineering Federation (ISMF),

The event was organized by the Korea Alpine Federation, and was held at the South Korean Yongpyong Ski Resort in the Gangwon Province from February 18 to 19, 2012.

== Results ==
Event was held on April February 19, 2012. It was only an individual race offered as at the 2007 edition. Like the European Championship of 2012 the Asian championship did not follow the previous edition in the typical biannual rhythm because the World Championship, which was originally planned for 2012, was moved to the year 2011.

List of the best 10 participants by gender:

=== Women ===
ranking	participant	total time
	(South Korea) Gwak Mi Hee	01h 52' 45"
	(South Korea) Kim Youngmi	01h 54' 56"

=== Men ===
ranking	participant	total time
	(Japan) Miura Yuji	01h 58' 33"
	(South Korea) Park Jong-il	01h 58' 40"
	(Japan) Fujikawa Ken	02h 02' 54"
4	(Japan) Yoshiaki Ito	02h 03' 55"
5	(South Korea) Pae Sungcheon	02h 14' 53"
6	(South Korea) Im Daebong	02h 20' 13"
7	(South Korea) Song Changseop	02h 22' 58"
8	(South Korea) Yong Heejung	02h 38' 14"
9	(Japan) Yamada Hiroshi	02h 42' 29"
10	(South Korea) Jung Seungkwon	02h 26' 40"
