= Xin Detao =

Chinese ski mountaineer (born 1991)

Personal information
- Born: 1991 (age 34–35)

Sport
- Sport: Skiing
Medal record
Men's ski mountaineering
Representing China
Asian Championships
Gold medal – first place	2009 Jilin	Vertical race
Silver medal – second place	2009 Jilin	Relay

Xin Detao (born 1991) is a Chinese ski mountaineer, and member of the national selection of the People's Republic of China.

== Selected results ==
- 2009:
  - 1st, Asian Championship, vertical race
  - 2nd, Asian Championship, relay (mixed teams), together with Huang Chunsen, Jin Yubo and Cui Xiaodi
