= Horibe =

Horibe (堀部) is a Japanese family name and may refer to:

- Michiko Horibe (堀部 美智子, born 1974), Japanese ski mountaineer and telemark skier
- Horibe Yasubei Taketsune (堀部 武庸 安兵衛, 1670–1703), Japanese warrior

== Fictional characters ==
- Itona Horibe (堀部 糸成), a character in the manga series Assassination Classroom
