= Cui Xiaodi =

Chinese ski mountaineer (born 1989)

Cui Xiaodi 崔晓迪
Personal information
- Born: March 7, 1989 (age 37)

Sport
- Sport: Skiing
Medal record
Women's ski mountaineering
Representing China
Asian Championships
Silver medal – second place	2009 Jilin	Relay
Bronze medal – third place	2009 Jilin	Individual
Bronze medal – third place	2009 Jilin	Vertical race

Cui Xiaodi (Chinese: 崔晓迪, born March 7, 1989) is a Chinese ski mountaineer, and member of the national selection of the People's Republic of China.

== Selected results ==
- 2007:
  - 4th, Asian Championship
- 2009:
  - 2nd, Asian Championship, relay (mixed teams), together with Huang Chunsen, Jin Yubo and Xin Detao
  - 3rd, Asian Championship, individual
  - 3rd, Asian Championship, vertical race
