= Kenro Nakajima =

Japanese alpinist (1984–2024)

- 中島 健郎
- Born: October 19, 1984; Takatori, Nara Prefecture, Japan
- Disappeared: July 27, 2024 (aged 39); K2
- Education: Kwansei Gakuin University
- Occupations: Professional climber, mountain cameraman
- Years active: 2006–2024
- Employer: ICI Ishii Sports
- Known for: First ascent of Panbari Himal (6,905 m), 2018, 2020, 2024 Piolet d'Or winner
- Children: 2

Takeo "Kenro" Nakajima (中島 健郎; October 19, 1984 – July 27, 2024) was a Japanese elite alpinist and cameraman who won three Piolet d'Or awards, considered to be the highest achievement in mountaineering. In 2018, Nakajima and his climbing partner Kazuya Hiraide received the 26th Piolet d'Or for their ascent of the unclimbed northeast face of Shispare, which they climbed in 2017. In 2020, the pair won their second Piolet d'Or for their ascent of Rakaposhi (7,788 m). They would win their final posthumous Piolet in 2024. Nakajima summited six of the Seven Summits and three eight-thousanders: Cho Oyu, Manaslu, and Mount Everest. He was known for making first ascents on other remote peaks across the Himalayas and the Karokoram.

== Early life and education ==
Nakajima was born on October 19, 1984, in Japan's Nara Prefecture. His interest in climbing came from his father, a keen climber who died when Nakajima was five years old. After his father's death, the family moved to Osaka, and his mother would take him to the mountains. In an effort to understand his father, he began mountaineering while a student at Kwansei Gakuin University and joined the mountaineering club. On his first trip to climb Mount Fuji, Nakajima suffered from hypothermia and altitude sickness. Despite the challenge, he was encouraged to continue mountaineering once he reached the summit and took in the view.

== Early climbing career ==
As a student, he traveled to the Himalayas three times, and climbed two previous unclimbed peaks. His first trip to Nepal was in 2006. The next year, Nakajima was part of a Japanese expedition from his university that made the first ascent of the east face of Panbari Himal (6,905 m).

In 2008, Nakajima and Hiroki Yamamoto made the first ascent of Dingjung Ri via the East Ridge (6,196 m). The next year, the pair made the first ascent of Dingjung Ri South (6,249 m) via the southeast face. It was the first authorized attempt on the peak from the Nepalese side.

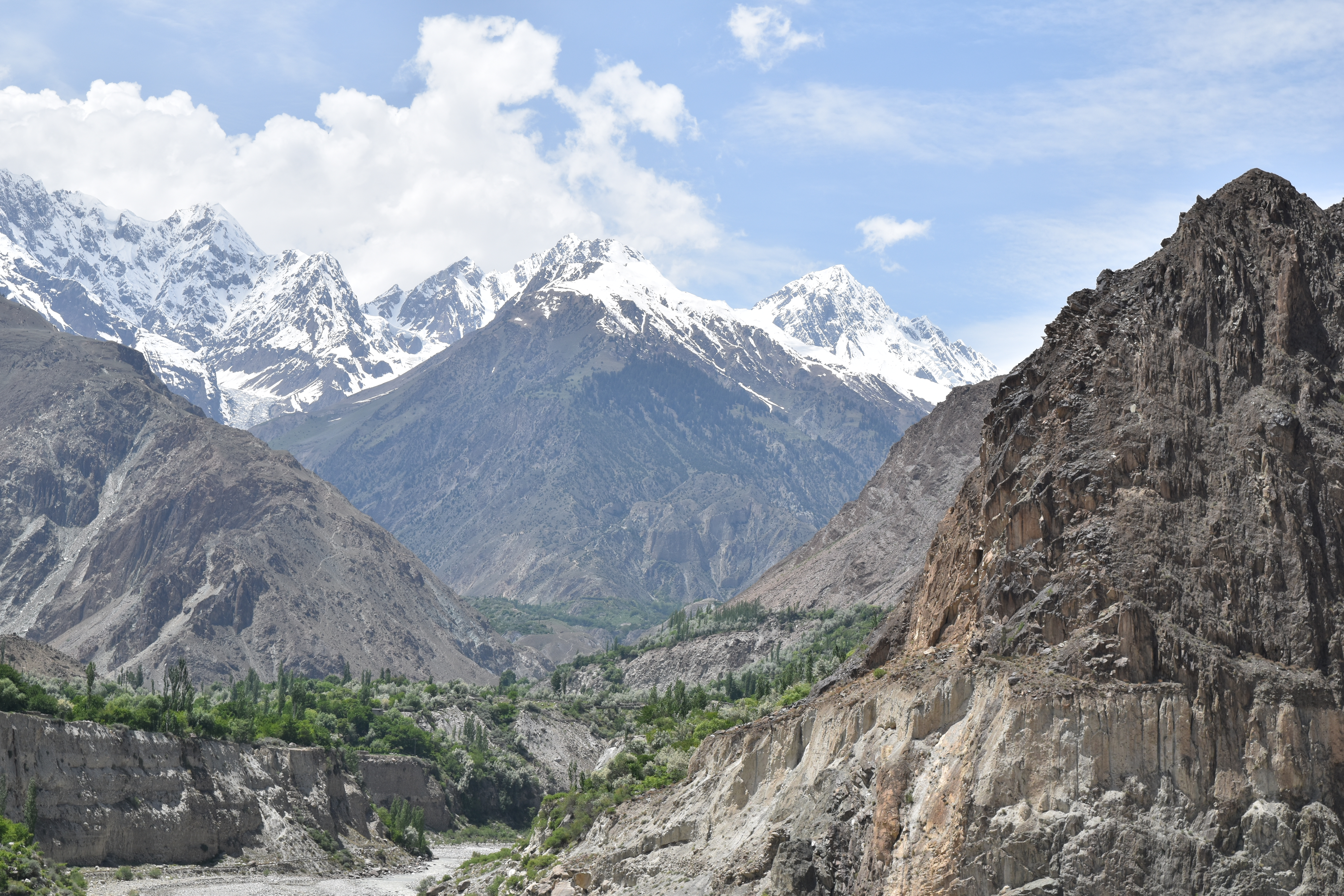
Pakistan's Gilgit-Baltistan, where Nakajima would make some of his most notable climbs

== Professional climbing career ==
After graduation in 2008, Nakajima looked for ways to continue climbing. He found work as a mountain tour guide and began a career as a cameraman, specializing in mountain films.

In 2013, Najakima made his first trip to climb a high peak in alpine-style, with an expedition to K6. His difficulty with acclimatizing at heights would remain with him, despite gaining more experience on big mountains around the world.

Najakima began climbing with professional climber Kazuya Hiraide in 2016. The next year, they summited the unclimbed northeast face of Shispare in Pakistan's Batura Muztagh. They named the route Shukriya (2,700 m, WI5 M6), and it would later be awarded one of 2018's Piolets d'Or awards. In 2019, while Nakajima and Hiraide were awaiting a climbing permit for Tirich Mir, they headed to Gilgit-Baltistan to look for other peaks to acclimatize. While there, they found Rakaposhi (7,788 m) and attempted a summit of the peak's south side. They forged a new route to the summit, reaching the peak on July 2, 2019. The climb would later be awarded their second Piolet d'Or in 2020.

In 2020, Nakajima became a sponsored athlete with Ishii Sports, an outdoor equipment supplier who would go on to sponsor his next expeditions with Hiraide. In 2022, Kazuya Hiraide and Nakajima made the second known ascent of Karun Koh (6,977 m), and the first via the northwest face. The next year, the pair climbed the north face of Tirich Mir (7,708 m), the highest peak of the Hindu Kush. They named their new route The Secret Line, which reached 2,000 m from the Lower Tirich Glacier to the summit. The climbs were done in preparation for a specific goal, attempting a new route on K2.

=== K2's West Face ===
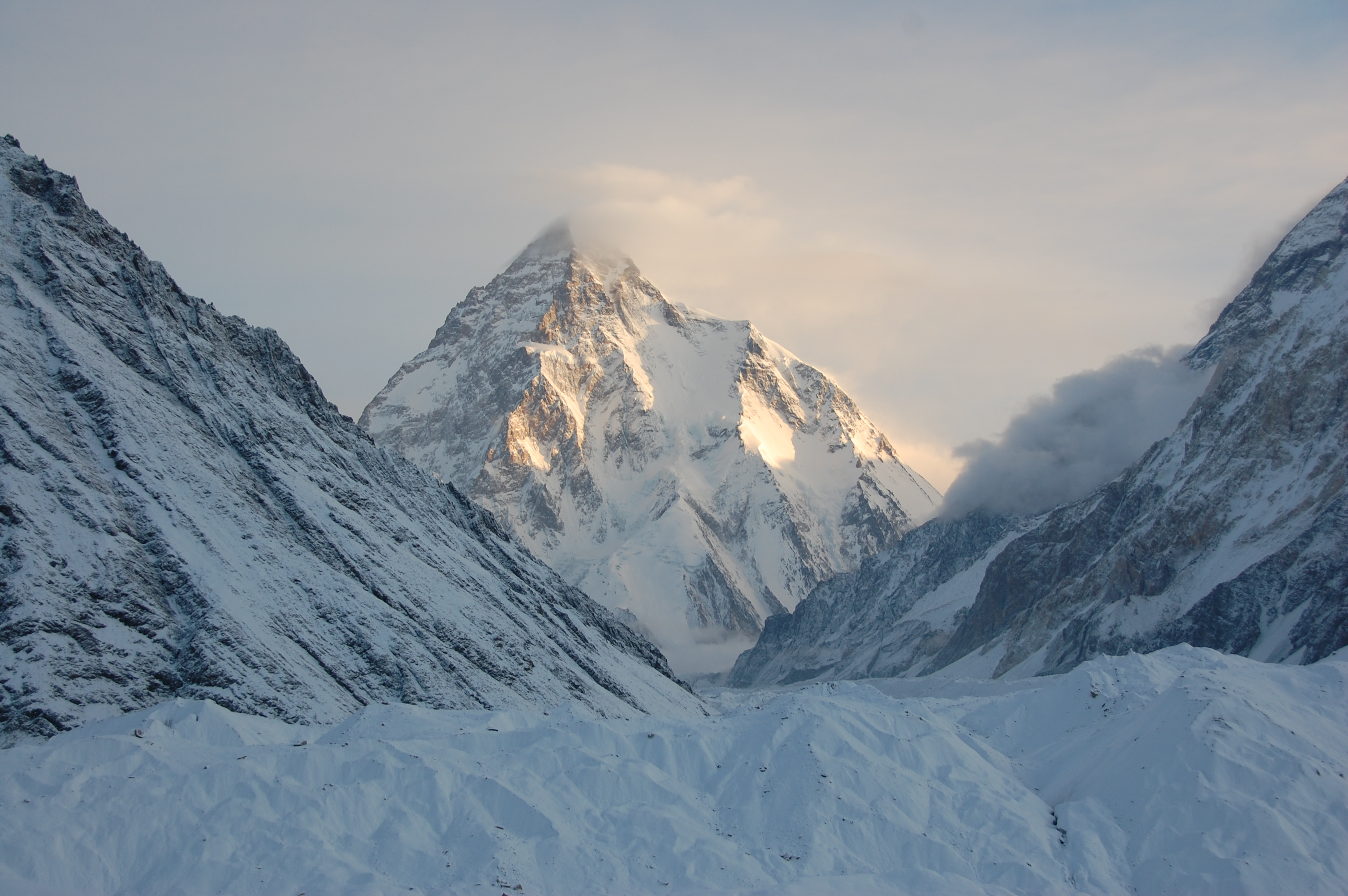
K2, reaching the summit was a long-awaited goal of Nakajima and Hiraide

In 2024, Nakajima and climbing partner Kazuya Hiraide announced their intention to climb a new route to K2's West Face (8,611 m) in alpine-style. Hiraide had long been public about his desire to climb K2 via a new route. In an interview in 2021, Nakajima, shared his climbing partner's enthusiasm, describing it as his immediate goal, and one that had a limited window due to his age. The K2 project was announced and the climbers kicked off their expedition in Pakistan in May. The summit via the west face had only been completed once before, in a classic expedition style using fixed ropes. The expedition to summit the peak alpine-style was considered by some to be one of the most anticipated climbs of the season.

The 2024 summit season on K2 was limited due to poor weather, and Hiraide and Nakajima spent weeks at advanced base camp. On July 24, the pair set off at 4:30 am, despite active rain and icy conditions. On July 27, Hiraide contacted the expedition's sponsor to let them know that he and Nakajima were planning to move to the upper part of Camp 2. Two hours later, the expedition sponsor alerted a Pakistani military helicopter to begin looking for the climbers, after the pair lost contact with their expedition team. Later that day, two motionless figures were found at 7,500m by the helicopter team, and a ground rescue was initiated. The climbers were found by helicopter in a remote location that could not be reached by air. On July 29, the expedition team's staff and crew left advanced base camp without reaching the climbers.

On July 30 expedition sponsor Ishii Sports announced that they had called off further rescue attempts due to dangerous conditions on K2. As of August 2024, neither Nakajima or Hiraide's bodies have been recovered.

=== Legacy ===
In September 2024, members of the Piolets d’Or technical committee named Hiraide and Nakajima's 2023 climb of The Secret Line as one of the year's most significant ascents. That October, The Secret Line was honoured with one of the 2024 Piolets d'Or. The posthumous award would be Nakajima's 3rd.

== Notable climbs ==
- 2006: Panbari Himal (6,905 m), first ascent
- 2008: Dingjung Ri South face (6,196 m), first ascent
- 2009: Thulagi (7,059 m), first known attempt, reached high point of 6,250 m
- 2011: Cho Oyu (8,188 m)
- 2012: Dhaulagiri (8,167 m)
- 2012: Matterhorn (4,478 m)
- 2013: Manaslu (8,163 m)
- 2013: K6, North-west face
- 2014: Hkakabo Razi (5,881 m)
- 2015: Api Main (7,132 m)
- 2015: Denali (6,190 m)
- 2016: Loinbo Kangri (7,095 m) north-northwest face, direct route
- 2017: Shispare, North-east face
- 2017: Mount Vinson (4,892 m)
- 2018: Mount Everest (8,849 m)
- 2018: Ama Dablam (6,814 m)
- 2019: Rakaposhi (7,788 m)
- 2019: Aconcagua (6,961 m)
- 2022: Karun Koh (6,977 m)
- 2023: Tirich Mir (7,708 m)
