= Jurjur Khona Sar =

Mountain in Pakistan

- Jur Jur Khona Sar
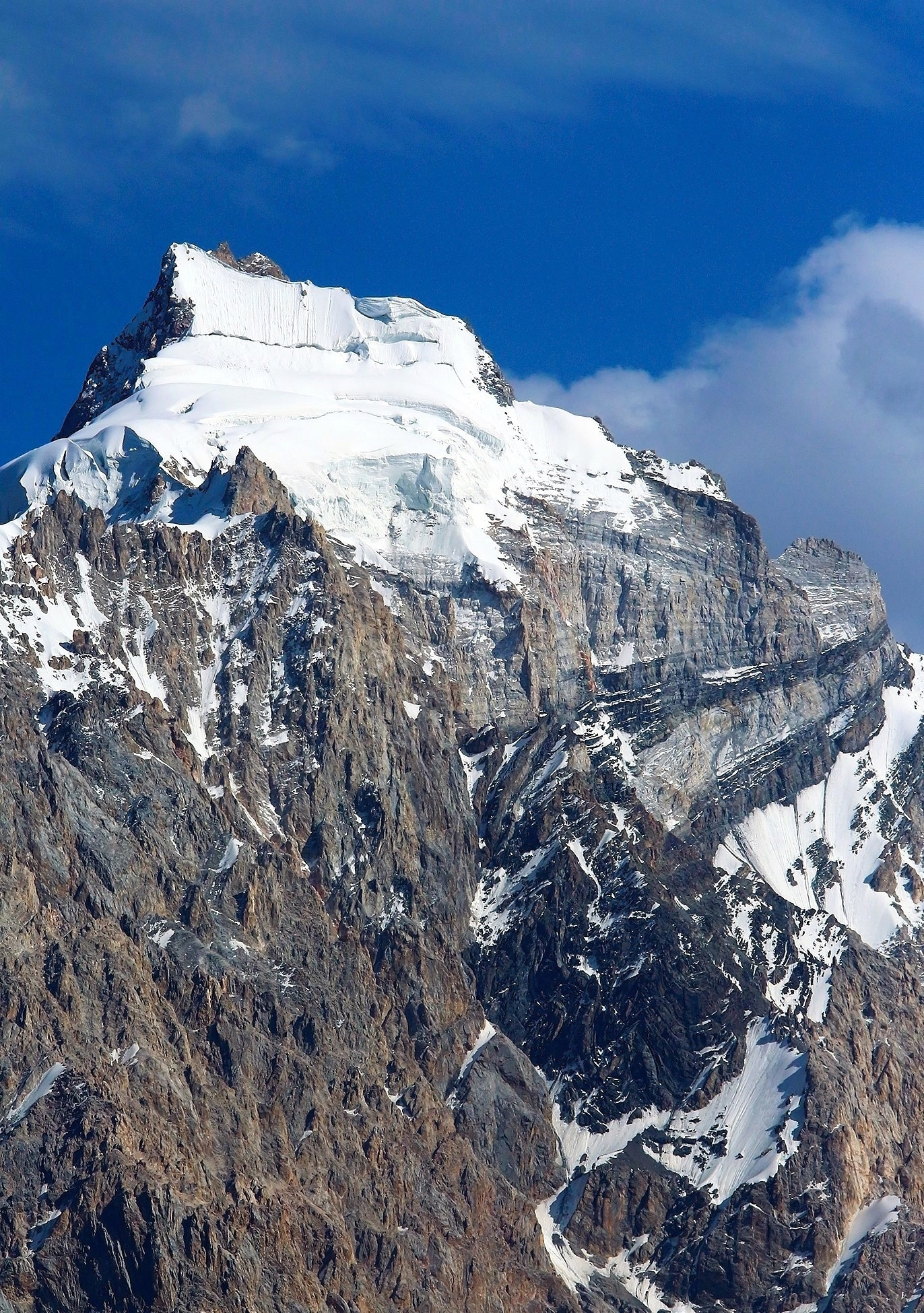
- North aspect

Highest point
- Elevation: 6,029 m (19,780 ft)
- Prominence: 800 m (2,625 ft)
- Parent peak: Tupopdan
- Isolation: 3.54 km (2.20 mi)
- Coordinates: 36°34′49″N 74°54′15″E

Geography
- Location within Karakoram Location within Gilgit Baltistan Location within Pakistan
- Interactive map of Jurjur Khona Sar
- Location: Kashmir
- Country: Pakistan
- Administrative territory: Gilgit-Baltistan
- District: Hunza
- Parent range: Karakoram; South Ghujerab Mountains

Jurjur Khona Sar is a mountain in northern Pakistan.

== Description ==
Jurjur Khona Sar is a 6,029-metre (19,780-foot) summit in the South Ghujerab Mountains subrange of the Karakoram. The mountain is situated 14 kilometres (8.7 mi) south-southeast of the village of Sust alongside the Karakoram Highway. Precipitation runoff from this mountain's slopes drains into tributaries of the Hunza River. Topographic relief is significant as the summit rises 3,330 metres (10,925 ft) above the Hunza River in five kilometres (3.1 mi). The nearest higher neighbor is Tupopdan, 3.5 kilometres (2.2 mi) to the southeast. The summit has not seen a first ascent, although British climbers made an attempt in 1988.

== Climate ==
Based on the Köppen climate classification, Jurjur Khona Sar is located in a tundra climate zone with cold, snowy winters, and cool summers. Weather systems are forced upwards by the mountains (orographic lift), causing heavy precipitation in the form of rainfall and snowfall. This climate supports an unnamed glacier below the east slope. The summer months offer the most favorable weather for viewing or climbing this peak.

== See also ==
- List of mountains in Pakistan

== Gallery ==
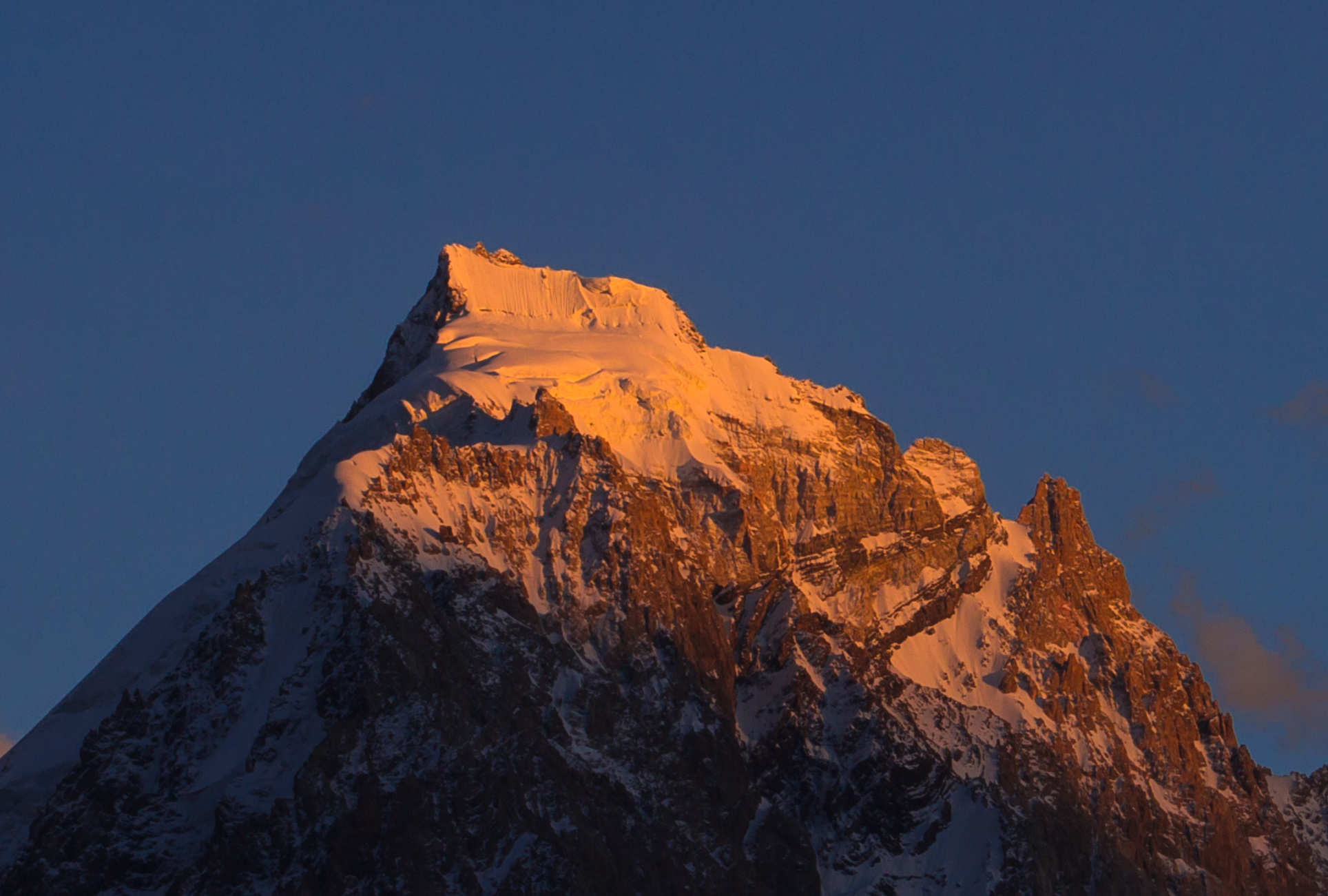
North aspect

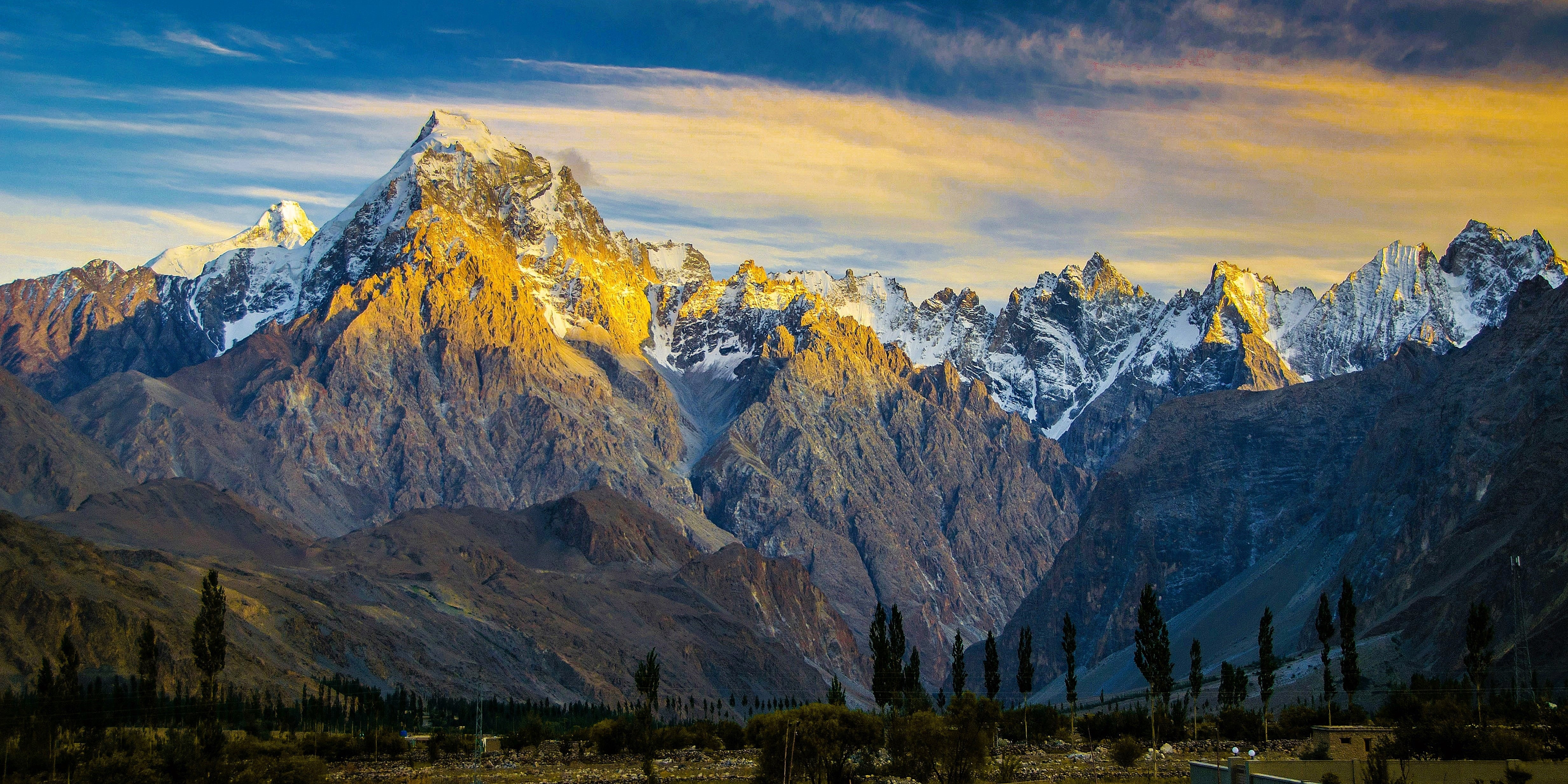
Jurjur Khona Sar (left) from north

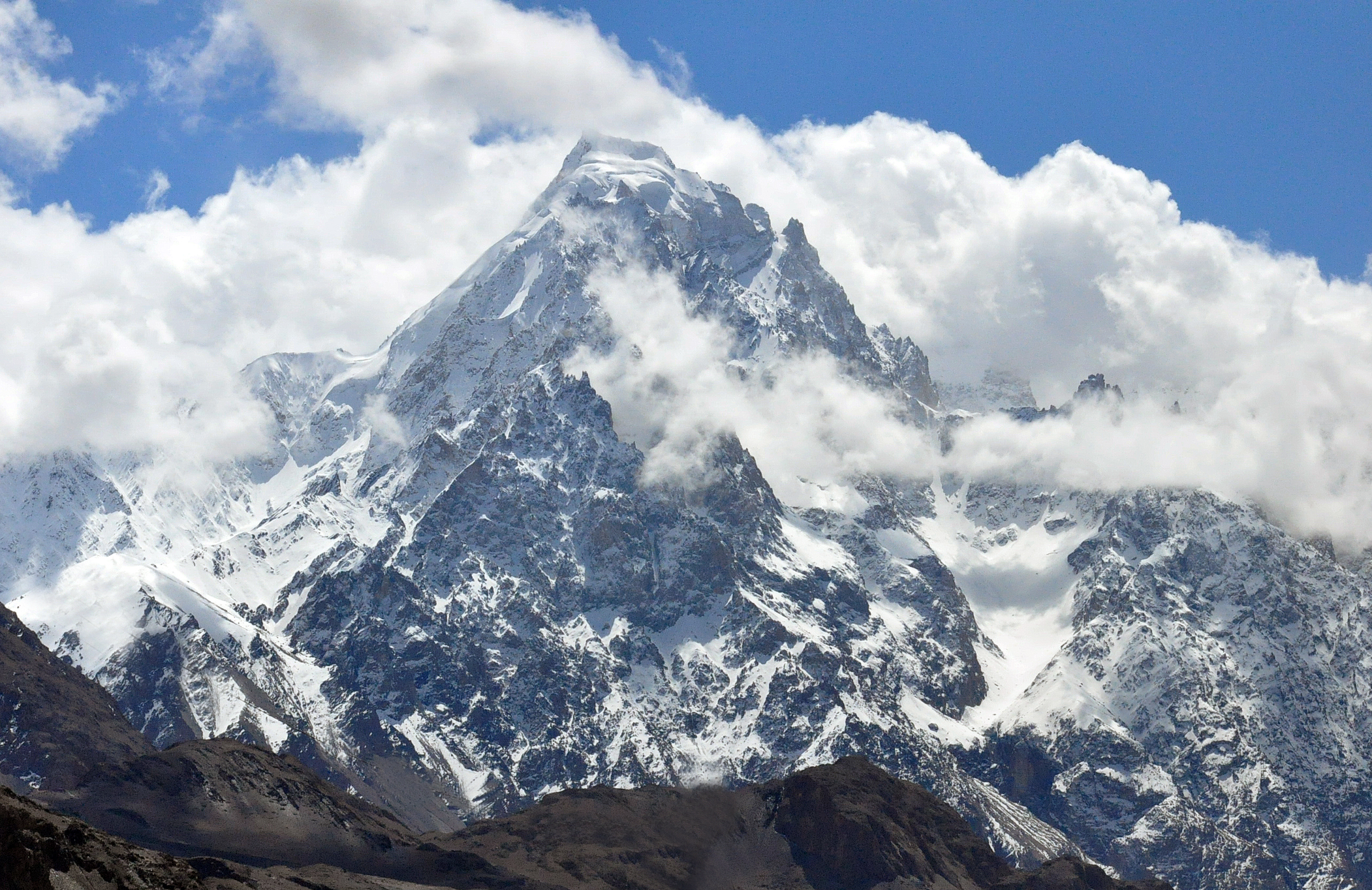
North aspect
