= Park Jong-il =

South Korean ski mountaineer (born 1972)

Personal information
- Born: 1972 (age 53–54)

Sport
- Sport: Skiing
Medal record
Men's ski mountaineering
Representing South Korea
Asian Championships
Bronze medal – third place	2015 Gangwon Province	Individual
Silver medal – second place	2013 Yongpyong	Individual
Silver medal – second place	2012 Yongpyong	Individual
Silver medal – second place	2010 Yongpyong	Individual
Bronze medal – third place	2009 Beidahu	Relay

- Park Jong-il
- Hangul: 박종일
- RR: Bak Jongil
- MR: Pak Chongil

Park Jong-il (Korean: 박종일; born 1972) is a South Korean ski mountaineer and mountaineer.

== Selected results ==
- 2009:
  - 3rd: Asian Championship, relay (mixed teams), together with Gwak Mi-hee
  - 6th: Asian Championship, vertical race
- 2010
  - 2nd: Gangwong Provincial Governor Cup of Ski Mountaineering, individual
- 2012:
  - 2nd: Asian Championship, individual
- 2013
  - 2nd: Asian Cup Ski Mountaineering Competition, individual
- 2015
  - 3rd: Asian Cup & Gangwon Provincial Governor Cup & Korea Championship, individual

== Mountaineering ==
- 2006 Mont Blanc ascent
- 2006 North Face of the Eiger ascent
- 2006 Grandes Jorasses ascent
- 2011 Moonflower Buttress of Mount Hunter first Korean ascent
- 2012 Mount Frances, Mount Hunter, Mount Mckinley ascent
