= 2009 Asian Championship of Ski Mountaineering =

The 2009 Asian Championship of Ski Mountaineering (Chinese: 亚洲滑雪登山锦标赛) was the second edition of an Asian Championship of Ski Mountaineering.

The event was organized by the Asia Ski Mountaineering Federation (ASMF), and was the first officially sanctioned Asian Championship by the new International Ski Mountaineering Federation (ISMF), which emerged from the ISMC in 2008. At this edition a vertical race and a relay race was added. So that the few female ski mountaineers could also participate in the relay race event, the teams were mixed with at least one female racer.

The championship was held at the Beidahu ski ressort in the Chinese Nagano Prefecture from February 10 to February 13, 2009. Participating were racers from China, South Korea and Japan.

== Results ==
=== Vertical race ===
Event held on February 11, 2009; participating where racers from China, South Korea and Japan; course length: 720 metres

List of the best 10 participants by gender:

==== Women ====
ranking	participant	total time
	(South Korea) Gwak Mi Hee	44' 44"
	(Japan) Mase Chigaya	45' 50"
	(China) Cui Xiaodi	48' 59"
4	(China) Zhang Na	51' 39"
5	(Japan) Horibe Michiko	52' 29"
6	(China) Lu Chuanjiao	55' 06"
7	(China) Wang Ping	59' 57"
8	(China) Li Luyang	1h 02' 55"
9	(China) Wang Jing	1h 10' 01"
10	(China) Wu Yanfeng	1h 23' 26"

==== Men ====
ranking	participant	total time
	(China) Xin Detao	41' 44"
	(China) Dai Junfeng	42' 16"
	(Japan) Sato Yoshiyuki	42' 20"^{*)}
4	(China) Huang Chunsen	43' 25"
5	(Japan) Hiraide Kazuya	43' 38"
6	(South Korea) Park Jong-il	44' 57"
7	(China) Luo Biao	46' 08"
8	(China) Jin Yubo	46' 44"
9	(China) Zhou Chuyan	47' 21"
10	(South Korea) Man Jung	47' 38"

^{*)} includes 90 penalty seconds

=== Individual ===
Event held on February 12, 2009; course length: 1.900 metres; course of the female racers was 300 metres shortened

List of the best 10 participants by gender:

==== Women ====
ranking	participant	total time
	(South Korea) Gwak Mi Hee	02h 16' 01"
	(Japan) Mase Chigaya	02h 20' 57"
	(China) Cui Xiaodi	02h 22' 04"
4	(Japan) Horibe Michiko	02h 33' 15"
5	(China) Zhang Na	02h 36' 00"
6	(China) Wang Ping	02h 38' 34"
7	(China) Li Luyang	02h 43' 15"
–	(China) Tang Yu	not finished
–	(China) Li Wenjing	not finished
–	(China) Lu Chunjiao	not finished

==== Men ====
ranking	participant	total time
	(Japan) Sato Yoshiyuki	02h 42' 33"
	(China) Jin Yubo	02h 48' 48"
	(China) Huang Chunsen	02h 53' 29"^{*)}
4	(Japan) Hiraide Kazuya	02h 59' 20"
5	(South Korea) Hyun Song-gi	02h 59' 37"
6	(China) Dai Junfeng	03h 00' 27"
7	(China) Luo Biao	03h 05' 11"
8	(Japan) Suzuki Keiichiro	03h 11' 12"
9	(Japan) Yamada Hiroshi	03h 16' 10"
10	(South Korea) Man Jung	03h 22' 07"

^{*)} includes 3 penalty minutes

=== Relay ===
Event held on February 12, 2009; mixed teams of at least one female (f) racer

ranking	team	total time
	(Japan) Mase Chigaya (f)/Sato Yoshiyuki/Suzuki Keiichiro/Hiraide Kazuya	01h 07' 50"
	(China) Cui Xiaodi (f)/Huang Chunsen/Jin Yubo/Xin Detao	01h 11' 40"
	(South Korea) Gwak Mi Hee (f)/Hyun Song-gi/Man Jung/Park Jong-il	01h 17' 07"
4	(China) Zhang Na (f)/Dai Junfeng/Luo Biao/Zhou Chuyan	01h 22' 26"
5	(China) Lu Chunjiao (f)/Liu Jifeng/Liu Boyu/Jin Xin	01h 32' 55"
6	(China) Li Luyang (f)/Ding Wei/Song Honggang/Gao Xiaoguang	01h 39' 10"
–	(China) Wang Ping (f)/Zhou Ruiyao/Wang Jianzhuang/Zhou Lei	not finished
