= Henry Day (British Army officer) =

British Army colonel

Colonel M W H (Henry) Day, MA, CEng, MICE, Royal Engineers was a British Army officer (retired 9 April 1997) who made the first British ascent (second ever ascent) of Annapurna I. In addition to the first British ascent of Annapurna, he was an active member of the Army Mountaineering Association (AMA) and a member of the Alpine Club (UK) contributing to the Alpine Journal. He was an active climber in the Alps and took part in the first winter ascent of the Grands Charmoz with Rob Collister. He was member of the AMA Tirich Mir (1969) expedition, summiting the peak; the AMA Himachal Pradesh (1973) expedition; the 1976 British and Nepalese Army Expedition to Everest. He led a Royal Engineers expedition to Trisul II (1978) and in 1981 a British Army expedition to the Da Xue Shan mountains in Sichuan province, China attempting to climb Jiaz (6,540 m). In 1987 Henry Day led the climbers attempting to climb the virgin east face of Xixabangma (8,027 m), in China, organised by the Scientific Exploration Society with a view to conducting scientific research en route. In 2008 he organised a climbing expedition to the Georgian Caucasus.
