= Tupopdan =

Mountain in Pakistan

- Passu Cathedral
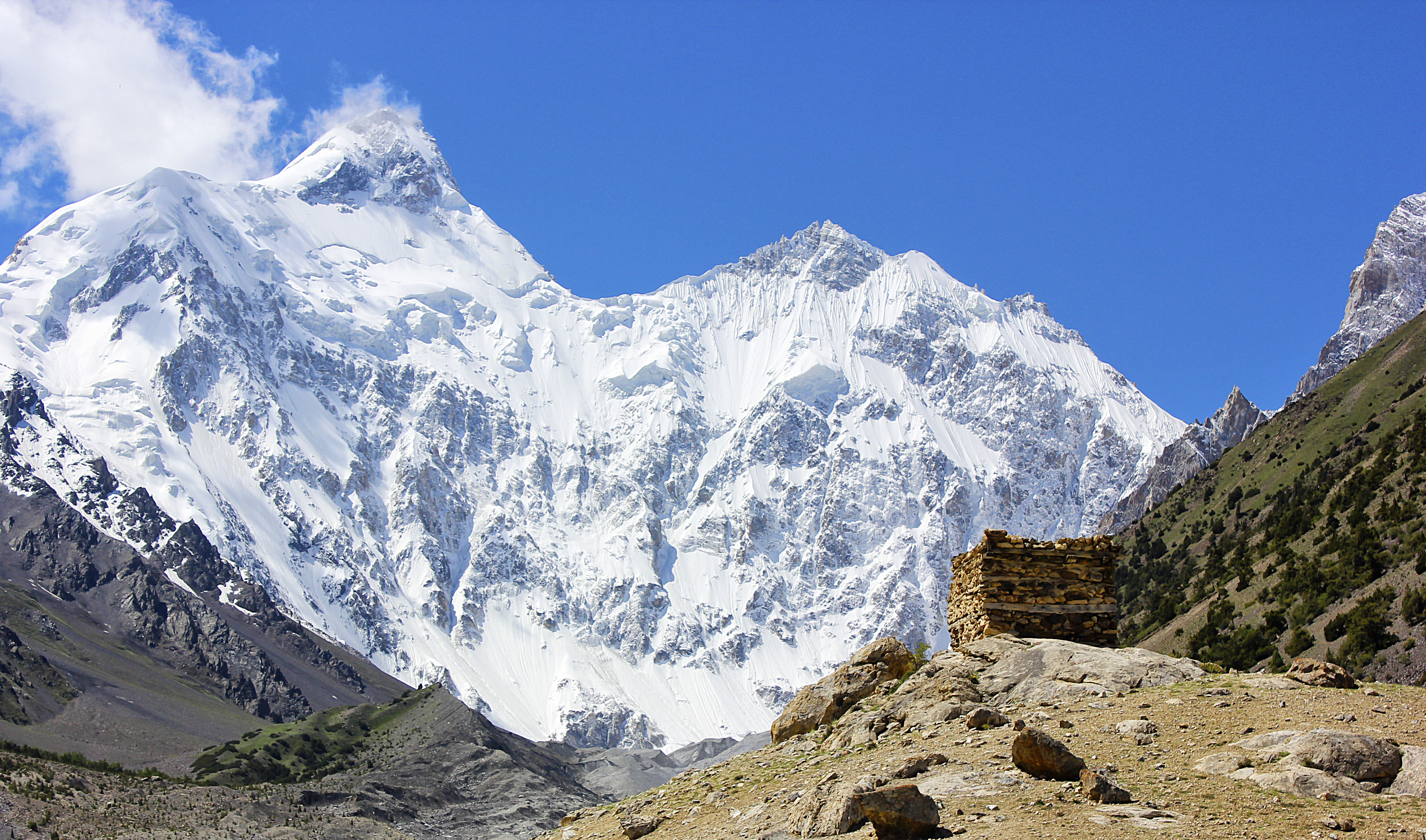
- North aspect

Highest point
- Elevation: 6,106 m (20,033 ft)
- Prominence: 1,255 m (4,117 ft)
- Parent peak: Karun Kuh
- Isolation: 12.7 km (7.9 mi)
- Coordinates: 36°33′26″N 74°56′01″E

Geography
- Location within Karakoram Location within Gilgit Baltistan Location within Pakistan
- Interactive map of Tupopdan
- Location: Kashmir
- Country: Pakistan
- Administrative territory: Gilgit-Baltistan
- District: Hunza
- Parent range: Karakoram; South Ghujerab Mountains

Geology
- Rock type: Limestone

Climbing
- First ascent: July 6, 1987

Tupopdan, also known as Passu Cathedral or Passu Cones, is a mountain in northern Pakistan.

== Description ==
Tupopdan is a 6,106-metre (20,033-foot) summit in the South Ghujerab Mountains subrange of the Karakoram. The mountain is situated 10 kilometres (6.2 mi) north of the village of Passu and the mountain is one of the most scenic sights along the Karakoram Highway. Precipitation runoff from this mountain's slopes drains into tributaries of the Hunza River. Topographic relief is significant as the north face rises 1,700 metres (5,577 ft) in 1.5 kilometres (0.93 mi), and the summit rises 3,600 metres (11,811 ft) above the Hunza River in seven kilometres (4.3 mi). The first ascent of the summit was achieved on July 6, 1987, by Andy Cave and John Stevenson via the Northeast Ridge. One source claims that Tupopdan means "sun-drenched mountain", whereas another source states it is a Wakhi word meaning "hot rock" which alludes to snow shedding quickly from the south slopes in winter.

== Climate ==
Based on the Köppen climate classification, Tupopdan is located in a tundra climate zone with cold, snowy winters, and cool summers. Weather systems are forced upwards by the mountains (orographic lift), causing heavy precipitation in the form of rainfall and snowfall. This climate supports two unnamed glaciers descending from the north slope. The summer months offer the most favorable weather for viewing or climbing this peak.

== See also ==
- List of mountains in Pakistan
- Hunza Valley

== Gallery ==
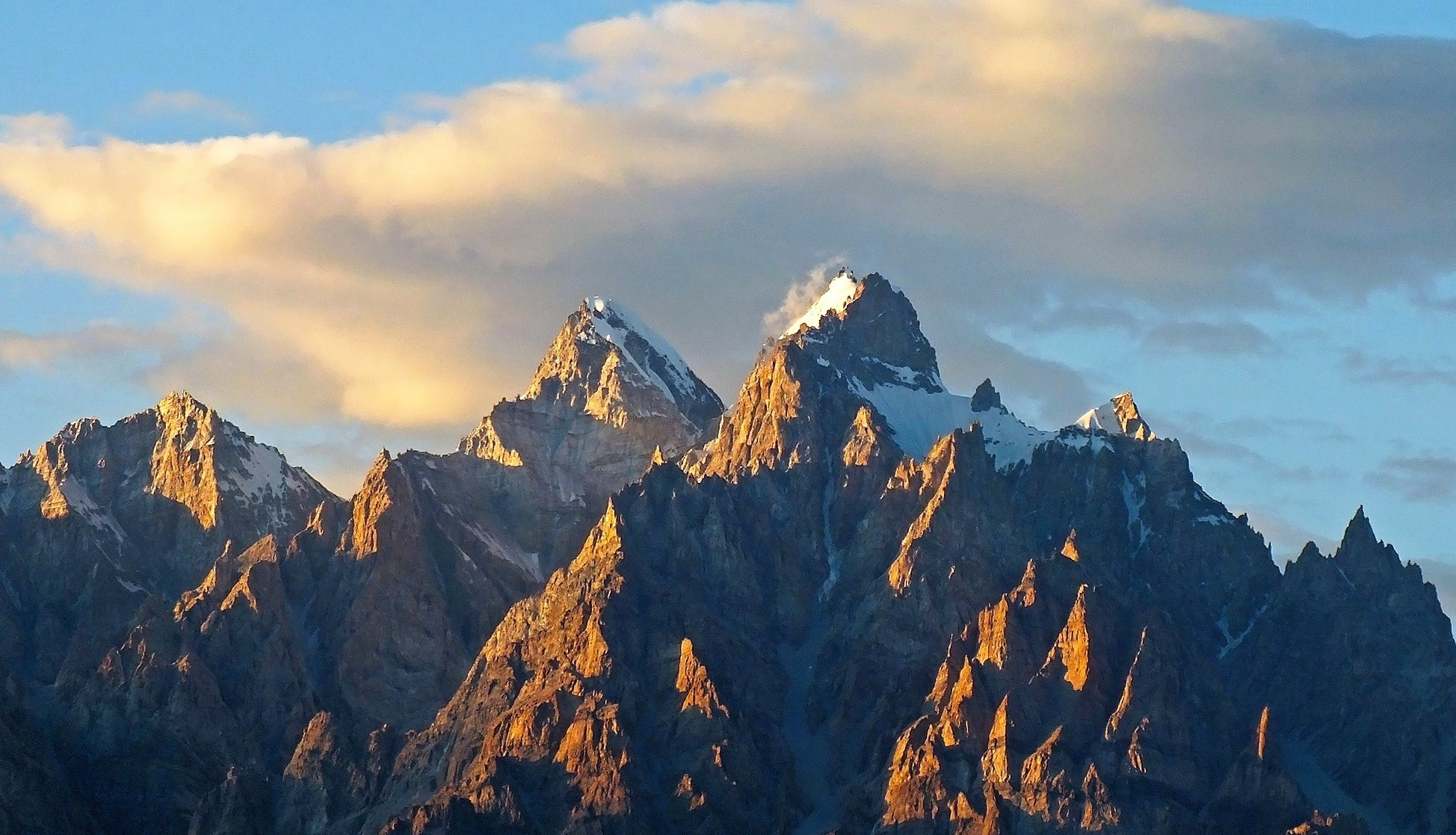
Tupopdan summit is left of center. South aspect.

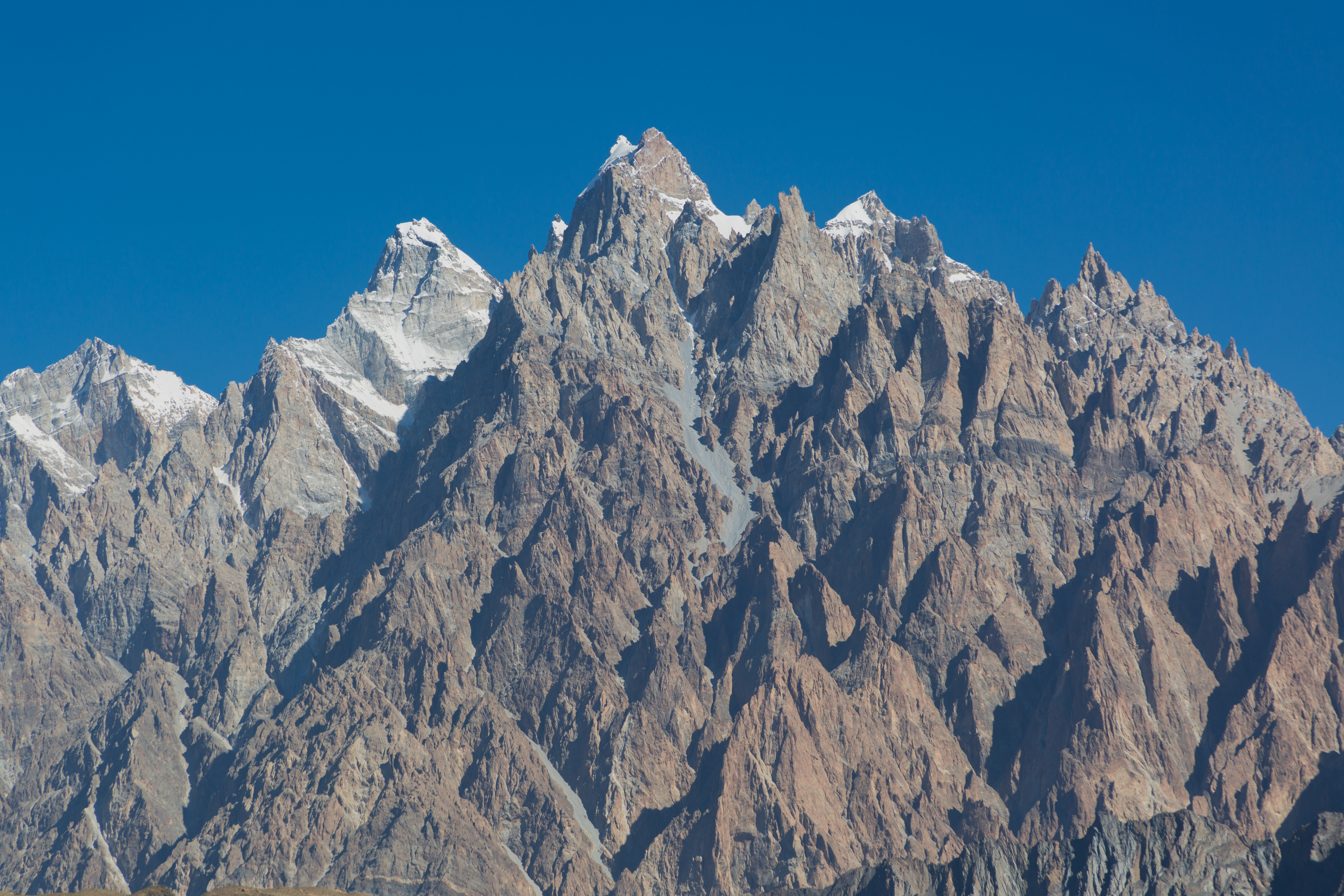
Passu Cathedral from south

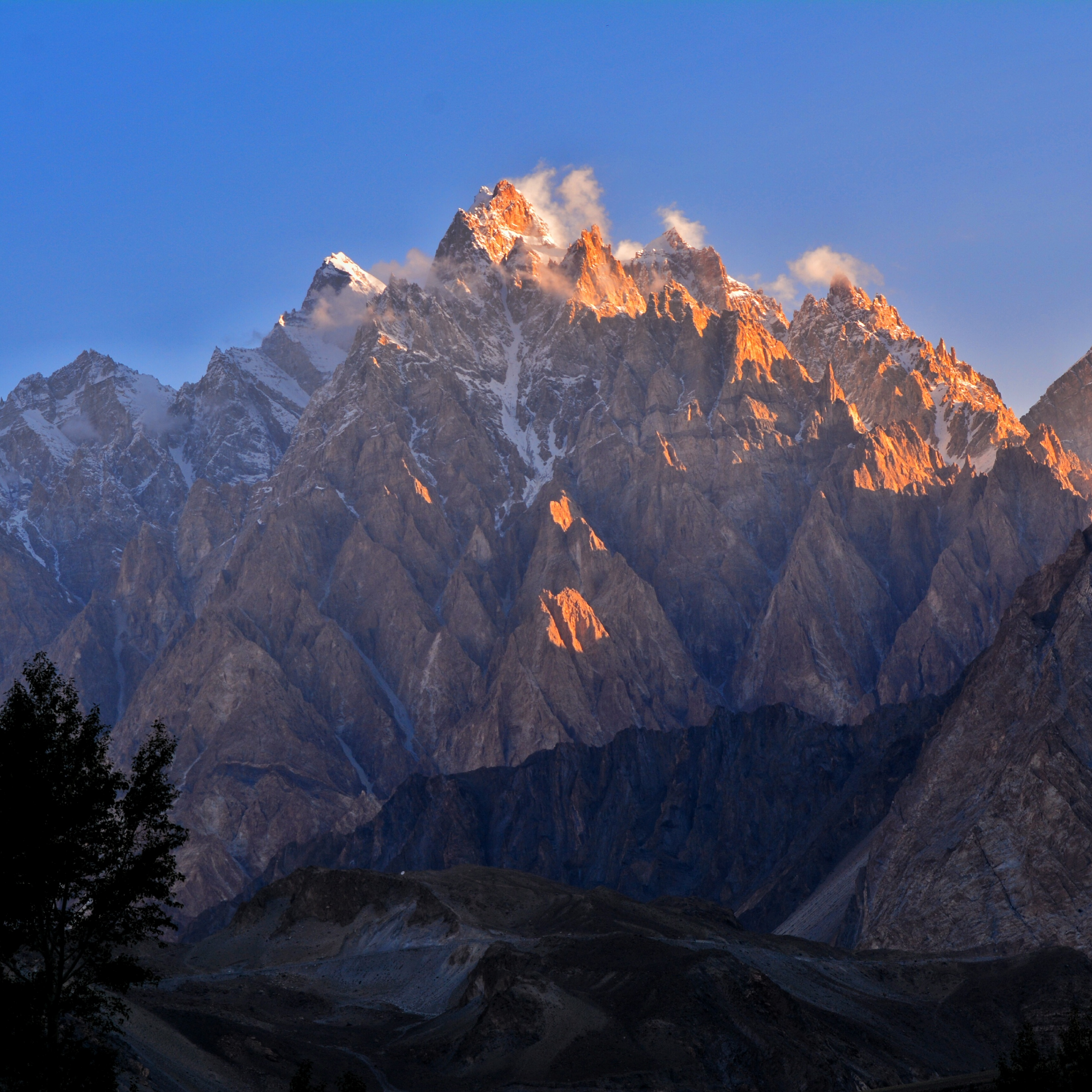
Passu Cathedral

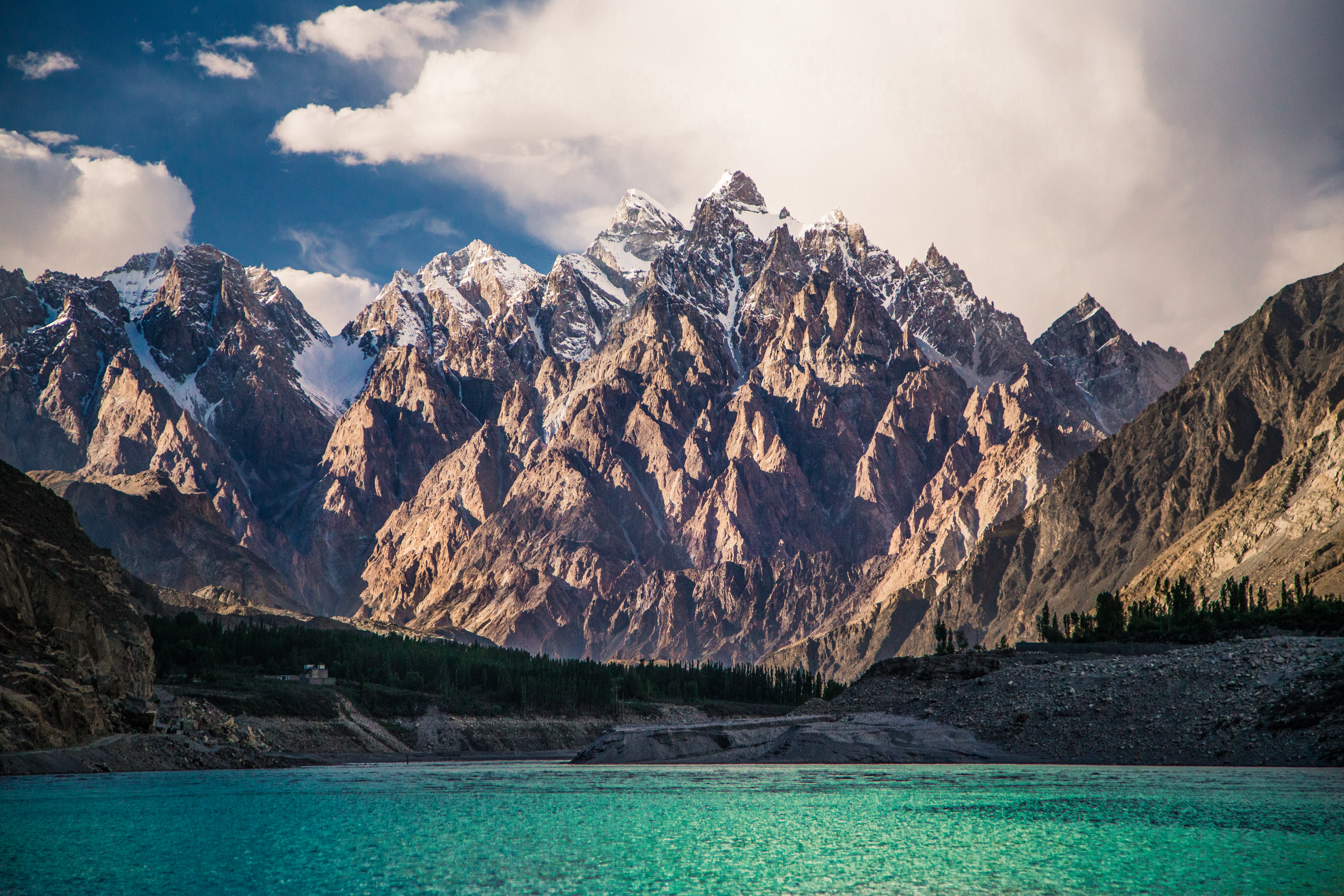
Passu Cathedral from Attabad Lake

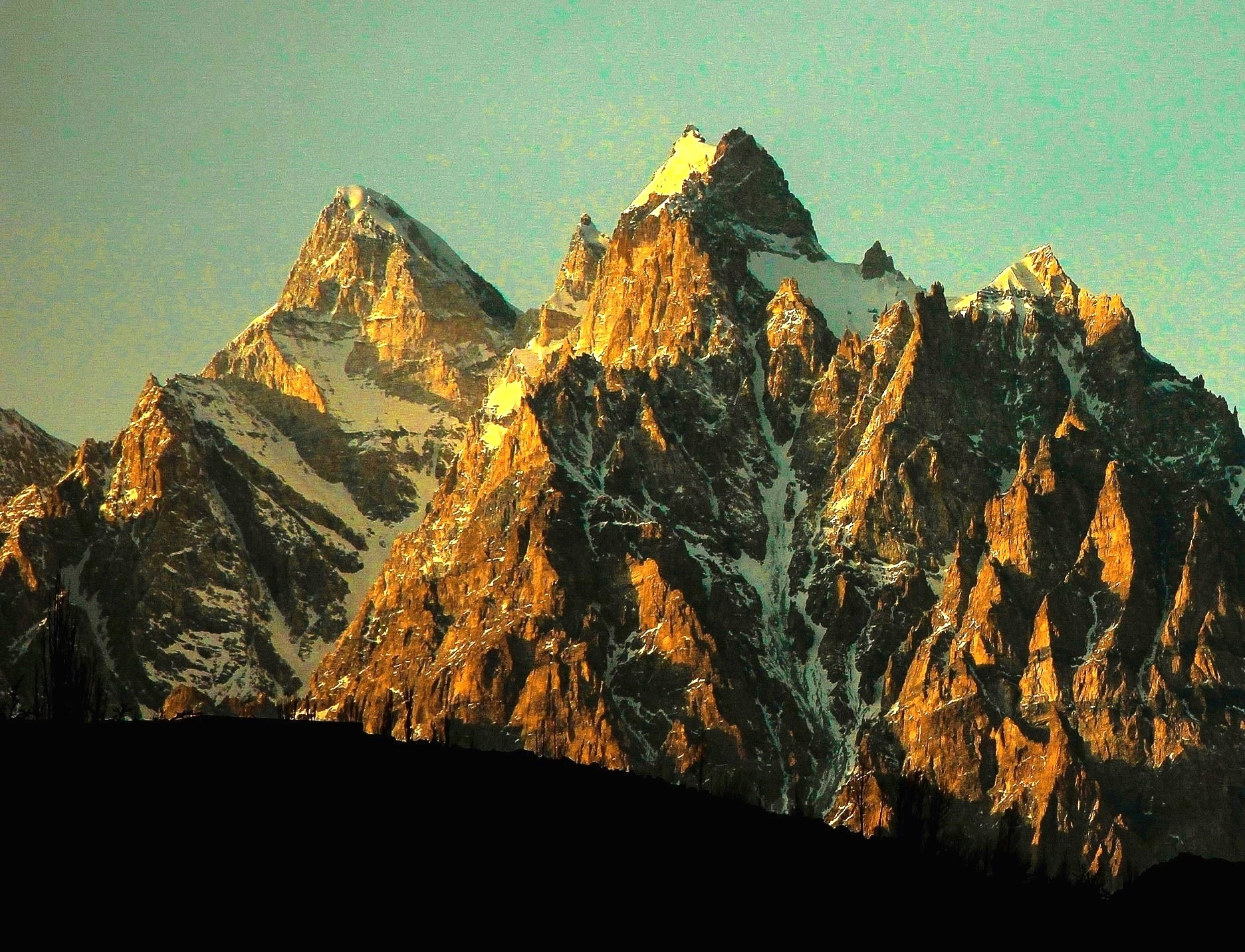
Tupopdan summit is left of center. South aspect.
