= Fujikawa =

Fujikawa may refer to:

- The Fuji River in Japan, called Fuji-kawa in Japanese
- Fujikawa, Shizuoka, Japan
- Fujikawa, Yamanashi, Japan
- Fujikawa (train), a Japanese limited express train

== People named ==
- Gyo Fujikawa (藤川 堯; 1908–1998), American illustrator
- Ken Fujikawa (藤川 健; born 1974), Japanese ski mountaineer and telemark skier
- Kyuji Fujikawa (藤川 球児; born 1980), Japanese baseball player
- Takayuki Fujikawa (藤川 孝幸; 1962–2018), football player

== Fictional Characters ==
- Rumiko Fujikawa, supporting character in Iron Man comics
- Dr. Wallace Fujikawa ScD, QEnD, the co-creator of the Shaw-Fujikawa Translight Engine in the Halo series.
