= Wang Bingbing =

Chinese ski mountaineer (born 1969)

Wang Bingbing 王冰冰
Personal information
- Born: December 31, 1969 (age 56)

Sport
- Sport: Skiing
Medal record
Women's ski mountaineering
Representing China
Asian Championships
Bronze medal – third place	2007 Nagano	Individual

Wang Bingbing (Chinese: 王冰冰; pinyin: Wāng Bīngbīng, born December 31, 1969) is a Chinese ski mountaineer.

== Career ==
Wang was member of the national selection of the People's Republic of China at the 2007 Asian Championship of Ski Mountaineering and finished third.
