= ASMF =

ASMF may refer to:

- Academy of St Martin in the Fields
- Active Substance Master File
- Asia Ski Mountaineering Federation
