= Huang Chunsen =

Chinese ski mountaineer (born 1991)

Huang Chunsen 黄春森
Personal information
- Born: 1991 (age 34–35)

Sport
- Sport: Skiing
Medal record
Representing China
Ski mountaineering
Ski mountaineering
| Silver medal – second place | 2009 Asian Championship | Relay |
| Bronze medal – third place | 2009 Asian Championship | Individual |

Huang Chunsen (Chinese: 黄春森, born 1991) is a Chinese ski mountaineer, and member of the national selection of the People's Republic of China. He studies at Shenyang Sport University in Shenyang.

== Selected results ==
- 2009:
  - 2nd, Asian Championship, relay (mixed teams), together with Cui Xiaodi, Xin Detao and Jin Yubo
  - 3rd, Asian Championship, individual,
  - 4th, Asian Championship, vertical race
