= Tony Streather =

British Army soldier and mountaineer (1926–2018)

Lieutenant Colonel Tony Streather OBE
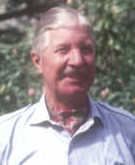
- Streather in 1990
- Born: 24 March 1926; Golders Green, London
- Died: 31 October 2018 (aged 92)
- Resting place: Hindon, Wiltshire
- Occupation: Soldier
- Known for: Mountaineer

Lieutenant-Colonel Harry Reginald Antony Streather OBE (24 March 1926 – 31 October 2018) was a British Army officer who served in the Gloucestershire Regiment, and mountaineer who first ascended the third-highest mountain in the world, Kangchenjunga, on the 1955 British Kangchenjunga expedition, and Tirich Mir. Streather was the first man ever to climb two peaks above 25,000 feet (7,600 m).

== Military career ==
Streather was originally commissioned into the Indian Army where he saw service towards the end of the Second World War. He transferred to the Gloucestershire Regiment in 1947 and was immediately awarded his 'war rank' of lieutenant. He was promoted to captain in 1953 and to lieutenant-colonel in 1967. In the 1965 New Year Honours he was appointed a Member of the Order of the British Empire and in the 1977 New Year Honours he was promoted to Officer of the Order of the British Empire.

== Mountaineering achievements ==
As a captain posted to the Chitral region of Pakistan, Streather was the official government representative in a Norwegian expedition that made the first ascent in 1951 of Tirich Mir (7,710 m), the highest mountain of the Hindu Kush. He was initially appointed transport officer, but became a member of the successful summiting team. On his return to Britain he was invited to join the Alpine Club (he later became its president from 1990 to 1993), and was selected for trials for the 1953 British Mount Everest expedition. He was rejected for the latter because of a lack of technical experience, but nearly at the same time was invited to join the 1953 American Karakoram Expedition, which attempted a far more technical route up K2, the second highest mountain in the world. Though again originally in charge of logistics, he climbed as high as anyone else and was involved in the dramatic events at 7,800 m.

In 1955, Streather participated in the 1955 British Kangchenjunga expedition, the third highest mountain in the world. With Norman Hardie, he reached the summit the day after the first summit party of Joe Brown and George Band. This made him the first man ever to climb two peaks of over 25,000 feet (7,600 m). In 1957 he survived an epic near-ascent of Haramosh (7,397 m). In 1959 he led a successful expedition that included an ascent of Malubiting Southeast (6,970 m).

Streather led the 1976 British and Nepalese Army Expedition to Everest, which successfully put two British Army climbers on the summit: Bronco Lane and Brummie Stokes.

== Personal life ==
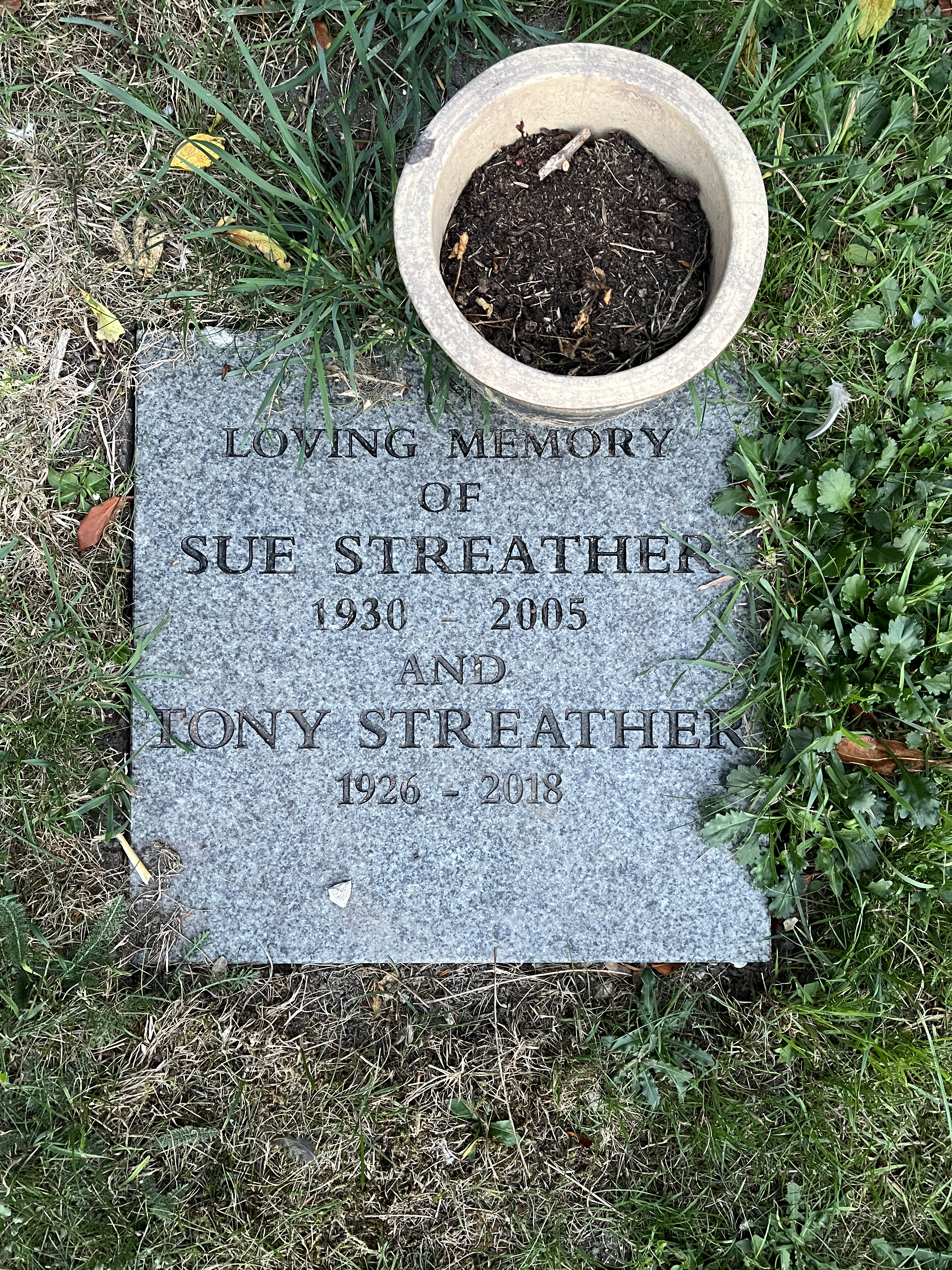
Ashes marker stone for Tony Streather, Hindon Church, Wiltshire.

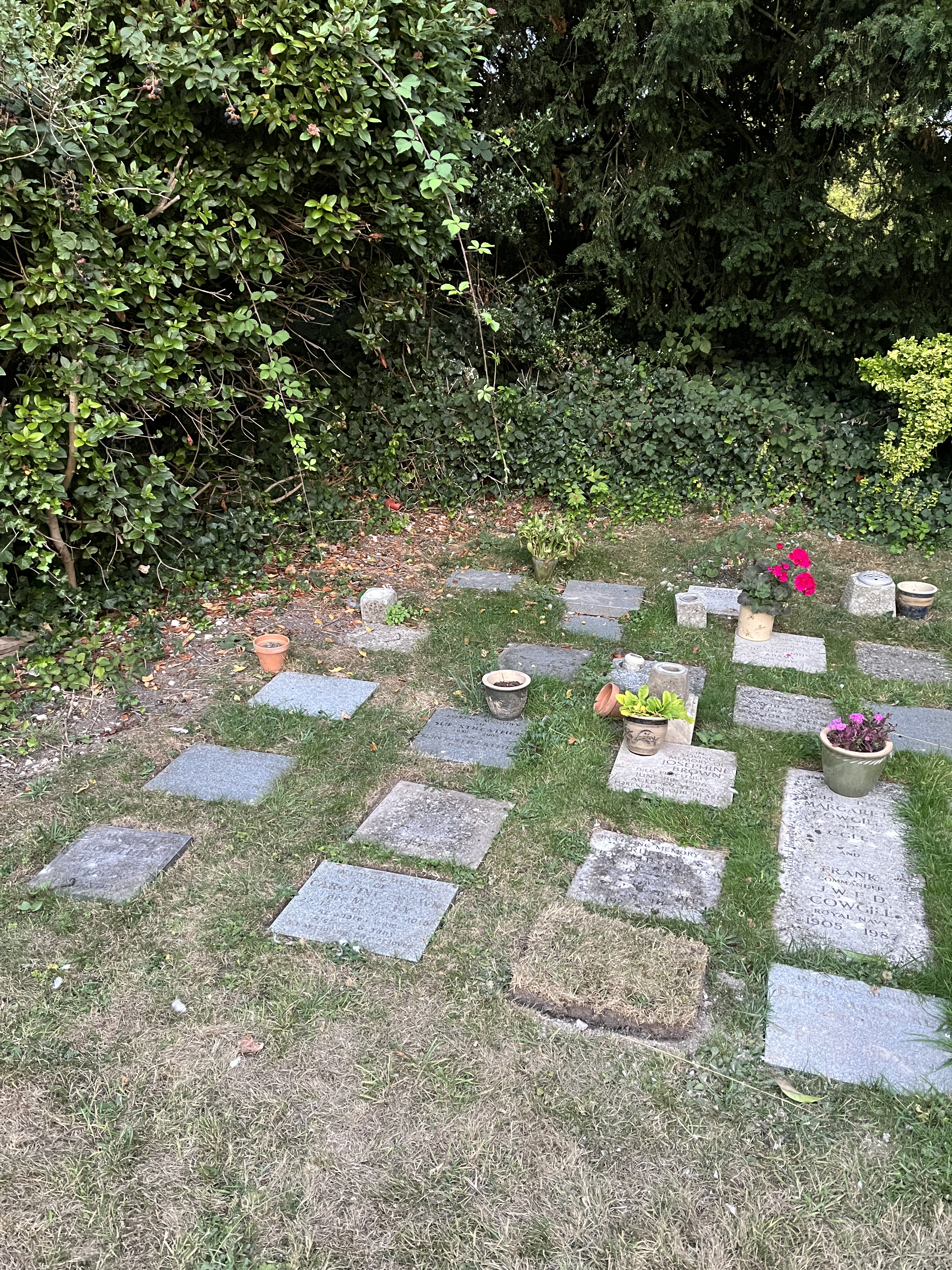
Ashes marker stone for Tony Streather among other marker stones, Hindon Church, Wiltshire.

Streather married his wife Sue (née Mary Huggan) in April 1956, and they had a daughter and three sons. Streather lived in his later years in the village of Hindon, Wiltshire. He died on 31 October 2018 at the age of 92. Sir Chris Bonington spoke at Streather's memorial service in Hindon Parish Church, and his ashes were interred in the churchyard.
