= Catrin Thomas =

British ski mountaineer and mountain climber (born 1964)

Personal information
- Born: 5 October 1964 (age 61)

Sport
- Sport: Skiing

Catrin Thomas (born 5 October 1964) from Caernarfon, Wales, is a British ski mountaineer and mountain climber.

At the 2011 World Championship of Ski Mountaineering, she participated amongst others in the women's relay team (together with the two Japanese Horibe Michiko and Mase Chigaya), which finished tenth.

Thomas was awarded the Polar Medal in 2019 in recognition of her 17 summers in Antarctica.
