= Jin Yubo =

Chinese ski mountaineer (born 1987)

Jin Yubo 金煜博
Personal information
- Born: 1987 (age 38–39)

Sport
- Sport: Skiing
Medal record
Representing China
Ski mountaineering
Ski mountaineering
Silver medal – second place	2009 Asian Championship	Individual
Silver medal – second place	2009 Asian Championship	Relay

Jin Yubo (Chinese: 金煜博, born 1987) is a Chinese ski mountaineer, and member of the national selection of the People's Republic of China. He studies at Shenyang Sport University in Shenyang.

== Selected results ==
- 2009:
  - 2nd, Asian Championship, individual
  - 2nd, Asian Championship, relay (mixed teams), together with Cui Xiaodi, Huang Chunsen and Xin Detao
  - 8th, Asian Championship, vertical race
