= Kei Taniguchi =

Japanese mountain climber

Personal information
- Nationality: Japanese
- Born: 14 July 1972 Wakayama City, Japan
- Died: 22 December 2015 (aged 43) Daisetsuzan, Hokkaido, Japan

Climbing career
- Type of climber: Mountaineering
- Known for: First female winner of prestigious mountaineer prize Piolet d'Or

Kei Taniguchi (谷口 けい, Taniguchi Kei, 14 July 1972 – 22 December 2015) was a Japanese mountaineer. Her accomplishments included climbing new technical routes on various mountains in Alaska, Nepal, Tibet, Pakistan and China.

In 2009, she became the first female mountaineer to win the prestigious International Climbing award Piolet d'Or (Golden Ice Axe) after completing the first ascent of the Southeast Face of Kamet (7756 m) in India, sharing the award with her climbing partner Kazuya Hiraide. She was known for her fearless Alpinist climbing style with no Sherpa support and was considered a pioneer among her peers.

== Profile ==
She was born in Wakayama City, Japan, and spent her childhood in Chiba, Japan. When she was in school, she came across a book written by Naomi Uemura, and determined that she would climb mountains one day. Later in her life, Taniguchi became the author of numerous essays and worked as a conservation guide.

== Death ==
In December 2015, when trekking with a few other climbers on Mount Kurodake in the Daisetuzan mountain range in Hokkaido, Japan, she slipped while taking a break and fell to her death.

== Life summary and notable climbs ==
- 14 July 1972: Born in Wakayama City, Wakayama Prefecture.
- March 1998: Graduated from Meiji University.
- 2001: Ascended Mount McKinley (6,193m / USA). Climbed for two consecutive days.
- 2002: Participated in the Everest Cleaning Squadron 2002 with Ken Noguchi.
- 2003: Participated in the Everest Cleaning Squad 2003 with Ken Noguchi.
- 2004: First climb of Golden Peak [Northwest Ridge] (unexplored route / 7,027m / Pakistan). (Kazuya Hirade, Kei Taniguchi)
- 2004: First climb of Laila Peak [East Wall] (unexplored route / 6,200m / Pakistan). (Kazuya Hiraide, Kei Taniguchi)
- 5 September 2005: Ascended to Mustagh Ata [East Ridge] (7,569m / Xinjiang Uygur Autonomous Region, China). (Kazuya Hiraide, Kei Taniguchi)
- 12 October 2005: First climb of Shivling [North wall] (unexplored route / 6,543m / India). (Kazuya Hiraide, Kei Taniguchi)
- 16 May 2006: Ascent of Manaslu (8,163m / Nepal). (Ken Noguchi Manaslu Cleaning Mountaineering Corps: Kei Taniguchi)
- 17 May 2007: Ascent of Everest [North wall] (8,848m / Tibet Autonomous Region, China). (Ken Noguchi Chomolungma Cleaning Squad: Ken Noguchi, Jun Hiraga, Kei Taniguchi)
- 5 October 2008: Ascent of Kamet [Southeast Wall] (unexplored route / 7,756m / India); Samurai Direct.
- 2008: Won the 17th Piolet d'Or Award (Golden Ice Axe Award), the first time a woman was awarded. She won for the climbing of the southeast wall of Kamet. She shared this award with Kazuya Hiraide.
- 2 May 2011: Ascent of Mount Frances [Southwest Ridge] (3,185m / American Kahiltna Glacier). (Shinshu University Mountain Corps: Yasuhiro Hanatani, Kei Taniguchi).
- 7 May 2011: Ascent of Kahiltna Queen [West Wall] (3,773m / American Kahiltna Glacier). (Shinshu University Mountain Corps: Yasuhiro Hanatani, Kei Taniguchi).
- 24 May 2011: Ascent of Mount McKinley [West Buttress] (6,194m / USA). (Shinshu University Mountain Corps: Yasuhiro Hanatani, Kei Taniguchi, Kotaro Miyanishi, Shinsuke Oki).
- 17 June 2011: Ascent of Kahiltna Peak (4,000 m west peak, 4,100 m east peak / Kahiltna Glacier, USA). (Shinshu University Mountain Corps: Yasuhiro Hanatani, Kei Taniguchi).
- 9 October 2011: Ascent of Naimona'nyi [South East Wall] (7,694m / Tibet Autonomous Region, China). (Kazuya Hiraide, Kei Taniguchi)
- 2012: Ascent of Mount Aneto (3,404m /Spain). The climb was broadcast on NHK's Great Summits.
- 29 September 2014: Won the 4th Faust AG Adventurers Award by leading four Japanese female college students in the first ever climbing of the unexplored peak of Mansail in Mustang (6,242m / Nepal).
- 21 December 2015: Fell from Mount Kurodake in Daisetsuzan, Hokkaido, and disappeared for a day. The following day, she was found in a state of cardiopulmonary arrest, and was confirmed dead at the hospital. She was 43 years old.

== See also ==
- Piolet d'Or
- Naomi Uemura
