= Ken Fujikawa =

Japanese ski mountaineer and telemark skier

Personal information
- Full name: 藤川健 (Fujikawa Ken)
- Born: August 5, 1974 (age 51) Kitahiroshima, Hokkaidō, Japan

Sport
- Sport: Skiing
Medal record
Men's ski mountaineering
Representing Japan
Asian Championships
| Bronze medal – third place | 2012 Asian Championship | Individual |

Ken Fujikawa (藤川健, Fujikawa Ken; born August 5, 1974 in Kitahiroshima, Hokkaidō) is a Japanese ski mountaineer and telemark skier. He started telemark skiing at the age of 25.

== Selected results ==
- 2007: 4th, Asian Championship, individual
- 2012: 3rd, Asian Championship, individual
