= Michiko Horibe =

Japanese ski mountaineer and telemark skier

Personal information
- Full name: 堀部 倫子 (Horibe Michiko)
- Born: September 16, 1974 (age 51)

Sport
- Sport: Skiing

Michiko Horibe (堀部 倫子, Horibe Michiko; born September 16, 1974) is a Japanese ski mountaineer and telemark skier.

== Selected results ==
- 2007:
  - 5th (and 3rd in the senior's ranking), Asian Championship, Tsugaike Kōgen Ski Resort, Nagano, Japan
- 2009:
  - 4th, Asian Championship, individual
  - 5th, Asian Championship, vertical race
- 2010:
  - 10th, World Championship, relay, together with Itō Mayumi and Mase Chigaya
  - 3rd, Gangwon Provincial Governor's Cup, Yongpyong Ski Resort/Balwangsan
  - 3rd, Tsugaike, individual, Nagano Prefecture
- 2011:
  - 10th, World Championship, relay, together with Catrin Thomas and Mase Chigaya
