= Chigaya Mase =

Japanese ski mountaineer and ultramarathon runner

Personal information
- Full name: 間瀬ちがや (Mase Chigaya)
- Born: December 5, 1967 (age 58)

Sport
- Sport: Skiing
Medal record
Women's ski mountaineering
Representing Japan
Asian Championships
| Gold medal – first place | 2009 Jilin | Relay |
| Silver medal – second place | 2007 Nagano | Individual |
| Silver medal – second place | 2009 Jilin | Individual |
| Silver medal – second place | 2009 Jilin | Vertical race |

Chigaya Mase (間瀬ちがや, Mase Chigaya; born December 5, 1967) is a Japanese ski mountaineer and ultramarathon runner. She lives in Tokyo.

== Selected results (ski mountaineering) ==
- 2007:
  - 2nd, Asian Championship, Tsugaike Kōgen Ski Resort, Nagano, Japan
- 2009:
  - 1st, Asian Championship, relay (mixed teams of 1 woman & 3 men), Beidahu, Jilin, China
  - 2nd, Asian Championship, individual
  - 2nd, Asian Championship, vertical race
- 2010:
  - 10th, World Championship, relay, together with Itō Mayumi and Horibe Michiko
  - 1st, Asia Cup
  - 1st, Gangwon Provincial Governor's Cup, Yongpyong Ski Resort/Balwangsan
  - 1st, Tsugaike (Japan championship & Asia Cup 2nd race), individual, Nagano Prefecture
- 2011:
  - 10th, World Championship, relay, together with Catrin Thomas and Horibe Michiko
