= Panbari =

Six-thousander of the Nepalese himalaya

- Cho Himal
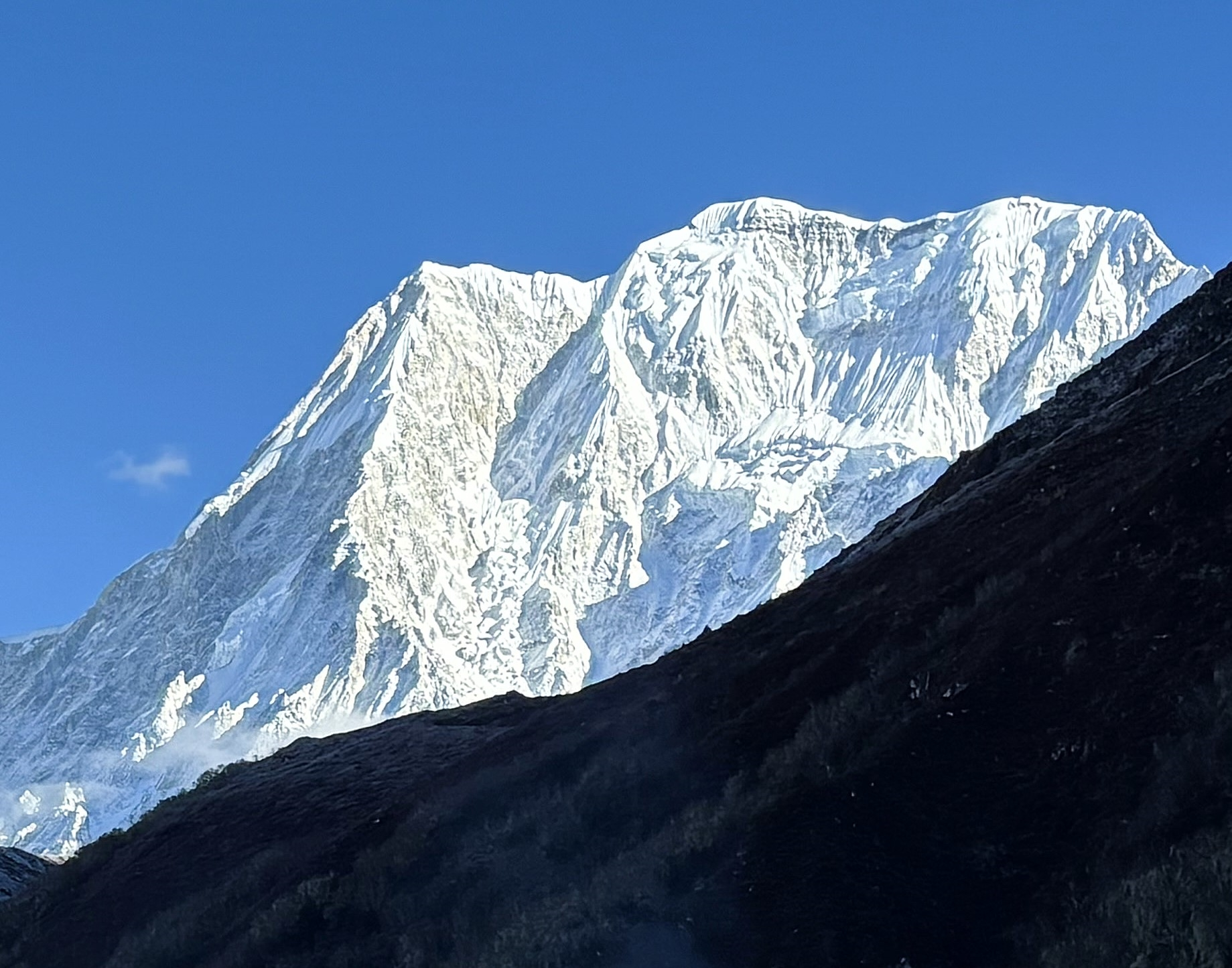
- South aspect

Highest point
- Elevation: 6,887 m (22,595 ft)
- Prominence: 775 m (2,543 ft)
- Isolation: 5.96 km (3.70 mi) to Nemjung
- Listing: Mountains of Nepal
- Coordinates: 28°43′6″N 84°29′02″E

Geography
- Location within Nepal
- Country: Nepal
- Province: Gandaki
- Parent range: Peri Himal

Climbing
- First ascent: September 29, 2006 by Sayaka Koyama, Kenro Nakajima, Yosuke Urabe, Yoshimi Kato, Gakuto Komiya

Panbari (alternatively, Panbari or Cho Himal) is a 6,887 m peak in Gandaki Pradesh, the Nepalese Himalayas. It is part of the Manaslu sub range and sits just outside the Manaslu Conservation Area. It is highest at the western side of the ridge. Panbari is situated just north of the Larkya La pass, which runs from the east to west.

The nearest neighbor to Panbari is Nemjung, which lies 5.96 km (3.70 mi) to the west-northwest. Himlung II and Himlung Himal lie to the northwest, at 4.83 and 5.19 miles away, respectively.

Panbari was first opened to foreign expeditions in 2002. In 2006, a Japanese university expedition team climbed the mountain in alpine style. Expedition members Yoshimi Kato, Gakuto Komiya, Sayaka Koyama, Kenro Nakajima, and Yousuke Urabe made the first ascent on September 27, 2006.
