= 2007 Asian Championship of Ski Mountaineering =

The 2007 Asian Championship of Ski Mountaineering (Japanese: 山岳スキー競技アジア選手権大会) was the first edition of an Asian Championship of Ski Mountaineering

The event was organized by the Japan Mountaineering Association (JMA), and was officially sanctioned by the International Council for Ski Mountaineering Competitions (ISMC).

The championship was held at the Tsugaike Kōgen Ski Resort in the Japanese Nagano Prefecture from 31 March to 1 April 2007, and was the third ski mountaineering race event in the region. It had the official partnerships of Otari village authorities, Tsugaike Kōgen Ski Resort, Nagano mountaineering federation and other groups.

The participants, predominantly male racers, came from Japan, China, South Korea as well as from New Zealand.

== Results ==
Event was held on April 1, 2007. Offered were separate individual races for male and female racers. The race course for male competitors was set at a height of 1,500 meters to 2,000 meters with a distance of 12 kilometers and with a total vertical difference over the course of 1,295 meters for male ski mountaineers, and the course for the female participants covered a distance of 8.2 kilometres with a vertical distance of 985 metres.

The New Zealanders Grant Guise and Jane Harper won each race but did not appear in the Asian Championship's ranking, because they were not Asian country nationals.

List of the best ten participants by gender:

=== Women ===
| ranking | participant | total time |
|---|---|---|
| | (South Korea) Gwak Mi Hee | 01h 53' 20.6" |
| | (Japan) Mase Chigaya | 01h 56' 21.9" |
| | (China) Wang Bingbing^{1)} | 02h 42' 49.8" |
| 4 | (China) Cui Xiaodi^{1)} | 02h 46' 58.6"^{2)} |
| 5 | (Japan) Horibe Michiko | 02h 56' 55.4" |

^{1)} junior class racers
^{2)} includes 3 penalty minutes

=== Men ===
| ranking | participant | total time |
|---|---|---|
| | (Japan) Yamada Seiji | 01h 53' 55.4" |
| | (Japan) Sato Yoshiyuki | 01h 59' 01.6" |
| | (Japan) Yokoyama Minehiro | 02h 04' 20.4" |
| 4 | (Japan) Fujikawa Ken | 02h 07' 47.6" |
| 5 | (Japan) Sato Akinori | 02h 18' 09.3" |
| 6 | (Japan) Yamaguchi Tatsuya | 02h 22' 01.2" |
| 7 | (Japan) Omoto Seiichi | 02h 30' 15.8" |
| 8 | (Japan) Ichikawa Shigehiko | 02h 31' 44.4" |
| 9 | (Japan) Suzuki Keiichiro | 02h 34' 03.8" |
| 10 | (Japan) Suda Tadaaki | 02h 34' 51.8" |
