= Bronco Lane =

British Army officer and author (1945–2024)

Michael Patrick Lane
- Born: 22 July 1945; Manchester, England
- Died: 22 March 2024 (aged 78)
- Military career
- Allegiance: United Kingdom
- Branch: British Army
- Service years: 1961
- Rank: Major
- Nickname: Bronco
- Unit: Special Air Service
- Conflicts: Aden Emergency; Dhofar Rebellion; Operation Banner
- Awards: British Empire Medal; Military Medal
- Other work: Mountaineer

Major Michael Patrick "Bronco" Lane, MM, BEM (22 July 1945 – 22 March 2024) was a British Army officer and author, known for his climbing expeditions which led to his summiting Mount Everest in 1976.

== Background ==
Born in 1945 in Manchester, Lane attended the Ullswater Outward Bound School in 1960 and joined Junior Leaders Royal Artillery in 1961. He volunteered for service in the 7th Parachute Regiment Royal Horse Artillery in 1964 and was selected for the Special Air Service in 1967. He fought in the Aden Emergency, Oman and in Northern Ireland where he was awarded the Military Medal.

== Mountaineering ==
Bronco joined the Army Mountaineering Association (AMA) in 1968 and took part in AMA expeditions to the Canadian Arctic in 1972, Indian Himalayas in 1973, Nuptse, Nepal in 1975. 1976 saw him joining a joint British-Nepalese Army expedition to Everest under the command of Lt. Col Tony Streather. The expedition succeeded in putting Lane and fellow SAS colleague Brummie Stokes on the summit on 16 May. After summiting Lane and Stokes were caught by bad weather and were forced to abandon their descent. The pair bivouacked in a snow hole near the South Summit for the night. Stokes tried and failed to attach an oxygen bottle to his face-mask. Lane had to remove his glove to attach the bottle but after an hour his hand was frozen. After the night in the open, both men's feet were badly frostbitten. Back home in England, doctors attempted to save the men's toes but the condition of their feet deteriorated in the summer heat. Eventually, he felt a tingling sensation in his foot and after removing his dressing found maggots in one of his toes which he removed with a cocktail stick. Lane lost his toes as well as the thumb and top halves of his fingers on his right hand.

Lane continued mountaineering, climbing in the Canadian Rockies in 1978–79 and Mount Kenya in 1983. In 1984 he led an expedition to Everest Tibet and was deputy leader of the Joint Services Everest Nepal 1992. He has also been involved with several Antarctica expeditions.

== Bronco's digits ==
Lane had his five fingers and 10 toes preserved in formaldehyde and kept them behind the regimental mess. When the National Army Museum approached him seeking items to commemorate his climb in 1976 Lane presented them with his severed digits together with an ice axe he used during his climb. Lane stated at the time that "I don't think it was quite what they were expecting...but I haven't got any use for them any more and I thought it would be nice to see them exhibited." The toes were not in good enough condition to be exhibited but the fingers were placed on display on a wooden plinth.

== Death ==
Lane died from complications of Alzheimer's disease on 22 March 2024, at the age of 78.

== Works ==
- Project Alpha. ISBN 978-1-904524-21-2
- Military Mountaineering – A History of Services Mountaineering, 1945 – 2000. Hayloft Publishing. ISBN 978-0-9523282-1-6

== See also ==
- List of 20th-century summiters of Mount Everest
