= South Ghujerab Mountains =

The South Ghujerab Mountains are a subrange of the Karakoram range in the Northern Areas of Pakistan. The highest peak in the range is Karun Koh, 7,164 m (23,503 ft). This is the only 7,000 metre peak in the range (if indeed it is over 7,000 metres, which is disputed.)

On the south, the range is separated from the Hispar Muztagh by the valley of the Shimshal River. On the north, the range is delineated from the North Ghujerab Mountains by the Ghujerab River; the combined range is bounded on the north by the Khunjerab River, along which lies the Karakoram Highway leading to Khunjerab Pass. On the west, the South Ghujerab Mountains are bounded by the Hunza River and its tributary, the lower Khunjerab River.
