= Asian Ski-mountaineering Federation =

International sports governing body

The Asian Ski-mountaineering Federation (ASMF) was founded at Beidahu on 10 February 2009, on the initiative of the Chinese Mountaineering Association (CMA), Korean Alpine Federation (KAF) and the Japan Mountaineering Association (JMA).

The continental organization collaborates with the International Ski Mountaineering Federation (ISMF), and develops ski mountaineering in Asia by attracting new member countries, promoting youth, offering competitions, and organizing major events as the Asian Championships, as well as organizing ISMF-training courses and camps.

Seat of the ASMF is Seoul, South Korea. Members of the first board were president Yoo Han Kyu from South Korea, and vice-presidents Saso Hiro from Japan and Ziang Zhi Jian from China. Honorary president was Yan Jin An from China.
