= Terich Mir =

Highest mountain of the Hindu Kush range, located in Pakistan

Tirich Mir
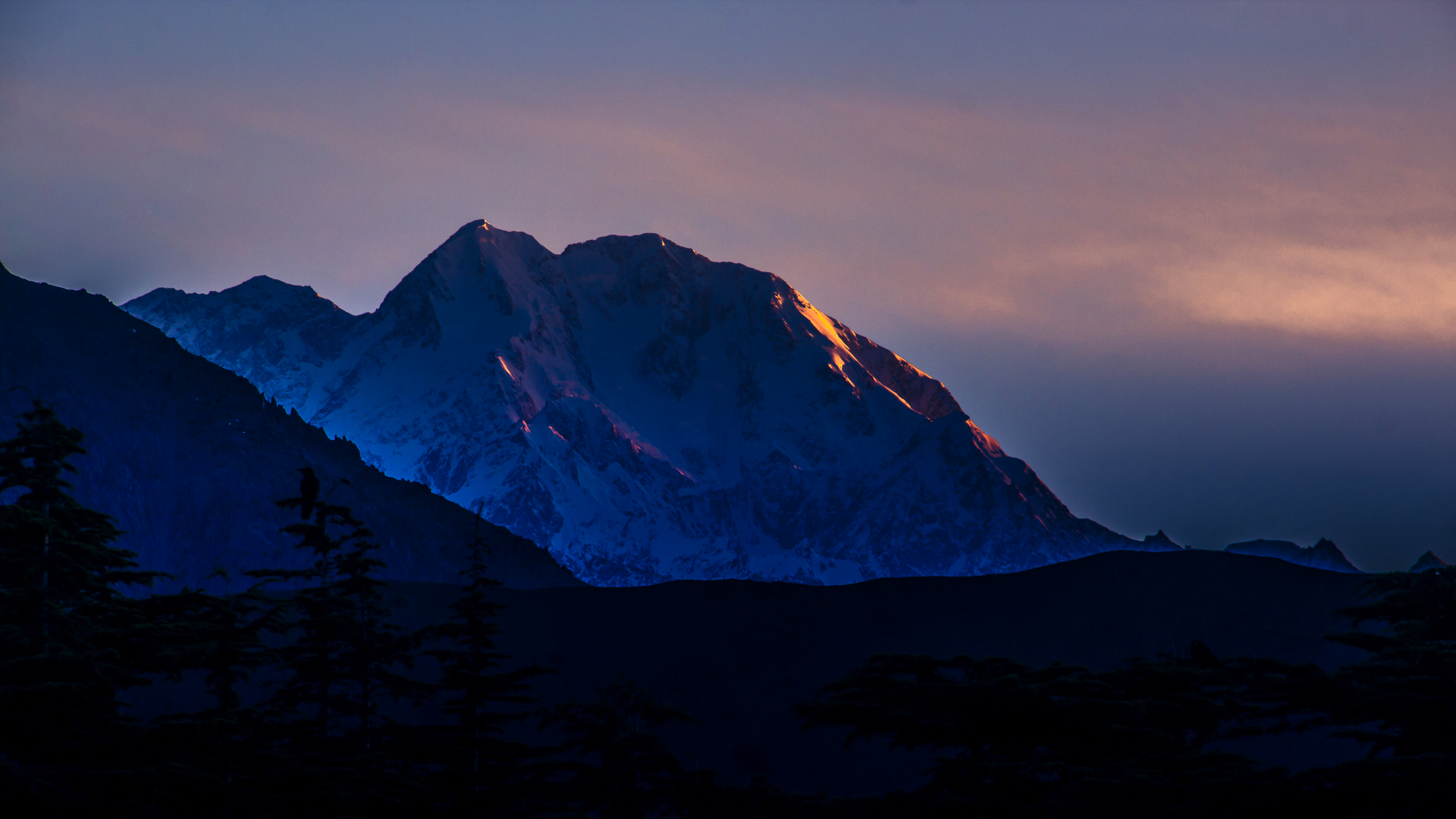
- Tirich Mir summit at night

Highest point
- Elevation: 7,708 m (25,289 ft); Ranked 33rd
- Prominence: 3,908 m (12,822 ft); Ranked 30th
- Listing: Ultra
- Coordinates: 36°15′15″N 71°50′36″E

Naming
- Native name: ترچ میر (Khowar)

Geography
- Location within Khyber Pakhtunkhwa Location within Pakistan
- Location: Chitral District, Khyber Pakhtunkhwa, Pakistan
- Parent range: Hindu Kush

Climbing
- First ascent: A. Næss, Per Kvernberg, Henry Berg, and T. Streather in 1950
- Easiest route: glacier/snow/ice

Terich Mir (also spelled Terichmir, Tirich Mir and Turch Mir), 7,708 meters (25,289 ft), is the highest mountain of the Hindu Kush range, the 33rd highest peak in the world and the highest mountain outside of the Himalayas–Karakoram range. It is located in the Chitral District of Khyber Pakhtunkhwa, Pakistan.

== Geography ==
Tirich Mir overlooks the town of Chitral and it can be easily seen from the main bazaar. The usual approach to the mountain is up the Tirich valley which has the Tirich Glacier at its head. The glacier is encircled by three of the 7000m peaks in the Hindu Kush: Tirich Mir, Noshaq and Istor-o-Nal. The meltwaters from the glaciers on the north side of Tirich Mir and the south sides of Noshaq and Istor-o-Nal flow into the river running down the Tirich valley to join the waters of the Torkhow River, and form a major tributary of the Chitral River.

From the confluence at the Torkhow valley, about 100km north-east of Chitral and a few km south of the village of Shagram, a jeep track leads up the Tirich valley to Shagrom, the highest permanent settlement. There are summertime grazing pastures and shepherd huts further up the valley from Shagrom, and above there is the snout of the lower Tirich glacier which is fed by glaciers from seven sub-valleys, those meet at the Tirich Concordia glacial confluence.

== Geology ==
The mountain is mainly composed of the mid-Cretaceous granitic Tirich Mir pluton which is cut by numerous dykes. The pluton cuts a sequence of metagabbros, peridotites and gneisses which form a high-grade metamorphic belt known as the Tirich Boundary Zone (TBZ).

== Mountaineering ==
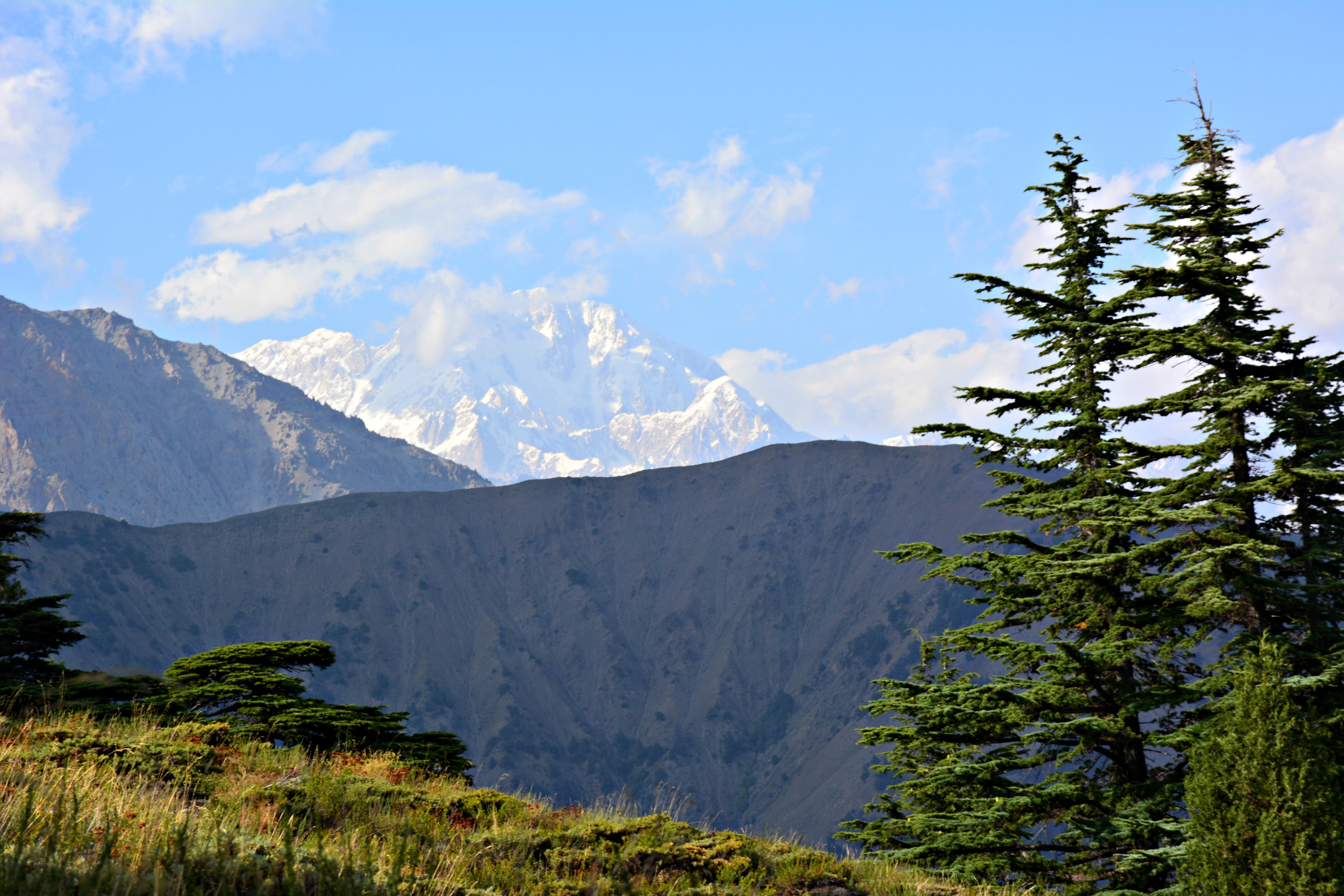
View of the peak from Chitral Gol

The first recorded ascent of the mountain was on 21 July 1950 by a Norwegian-British expedition consisting of Arne Næss, Per Kvernberg, Henry Berg, and Tony Streather, they approached the mountain from the South Barum glacier, which runs towards the peak from the south-east, and then climbed the south ridge. The expedition is depicted in the 1952 documentary film Tirich Mir til topps.

A Czechoslovak expedition established a route via the Upper Tirich Glacier and northwest ridge in 1967, that is now regarded as the 'normal route'.

In July 2023 the Japanese mountaineers Kazuya Hiraide and Kenro Nakajima made the first ascent of the 2,200m north face of Tirich Mir. They spent two days approaching the Lower Tirich Glacier from base camp and bivouacked three nights during the climb and once more as they descended to the northwest - along the 1967 'normal' route. The 2025 Piolets d'Or was awarded for this ascent, the award was made posthumously because the two climbers had fallen to their death in the summer of 2024 whilst attempting a new route on the West Face of K2 in alpine-style.

== Climate ==
The weather station 4,245 m (13,927 ft) above sea level lies in the Tundra climate/Alpine climate (ET) zone according to Köppen Climate Classification. On this specific altitude (4,245 m or 13,927 ft asl) we find moderately cold winters and cool summers generally above freezing. Annual mean temperature is −5.25 °C (22.55 °F), which puts the station well inside the range of continuous permafrost. The average temperature in the coldest month of January is −17.5 °C (0.5 °F) and the two hottest months of July and August have mean temperatures of 6.5 °C (43.7 °F). Average low temperatures range from −23 °C (−9 °F) in January to 0 °C (32 °F) in July and August. The summit has an Ice cap climate (EF) where no month has an average temperature above 0 °C (32 °F).

Climate data for Tirich Mir (4,235 m asl) Averages (1981–2010)
Month	Jan	Feb	Mar	Apr	May	Jun	Jul	Aug	Sep	Oct	Nov	Dec	Year
Mean daily maximum °C (°F)	−12 (10)	−11 (12)	−7 (19)	−2 (28)	3.0 (37.4)	9.0 (48.2)	13.0 (55.4)	13.0 (55.4)	9.0 (48.2)	0.0 (32.0)	−6 (21)	−10 (14)	−0.08 (31.86)
Daily mean °C (°F)	−17.5 (0.5)	−16 (3)	−12 (10)	−6.5 (20.3)	−1.5 (29.3)	3.5 (38.3)	6.5 (43.7)	6.5 (43.7)	3.0 (37.4)	−4 (25)	−10 (14)	−15 (5)	−5.25 (22.55)
Mean daily minimum °C (°F)	−23 (−9)	−21 (−6)	−17 (1)	−11 (12)	−6 (21)	−2 (28)	0.0 (32.0)	0.0 (32.0)	−3.0 (26.6)	−8 (18)	−14 (7)	−20 (−4)	−10.4 (13.3)
Source: Meteoblue

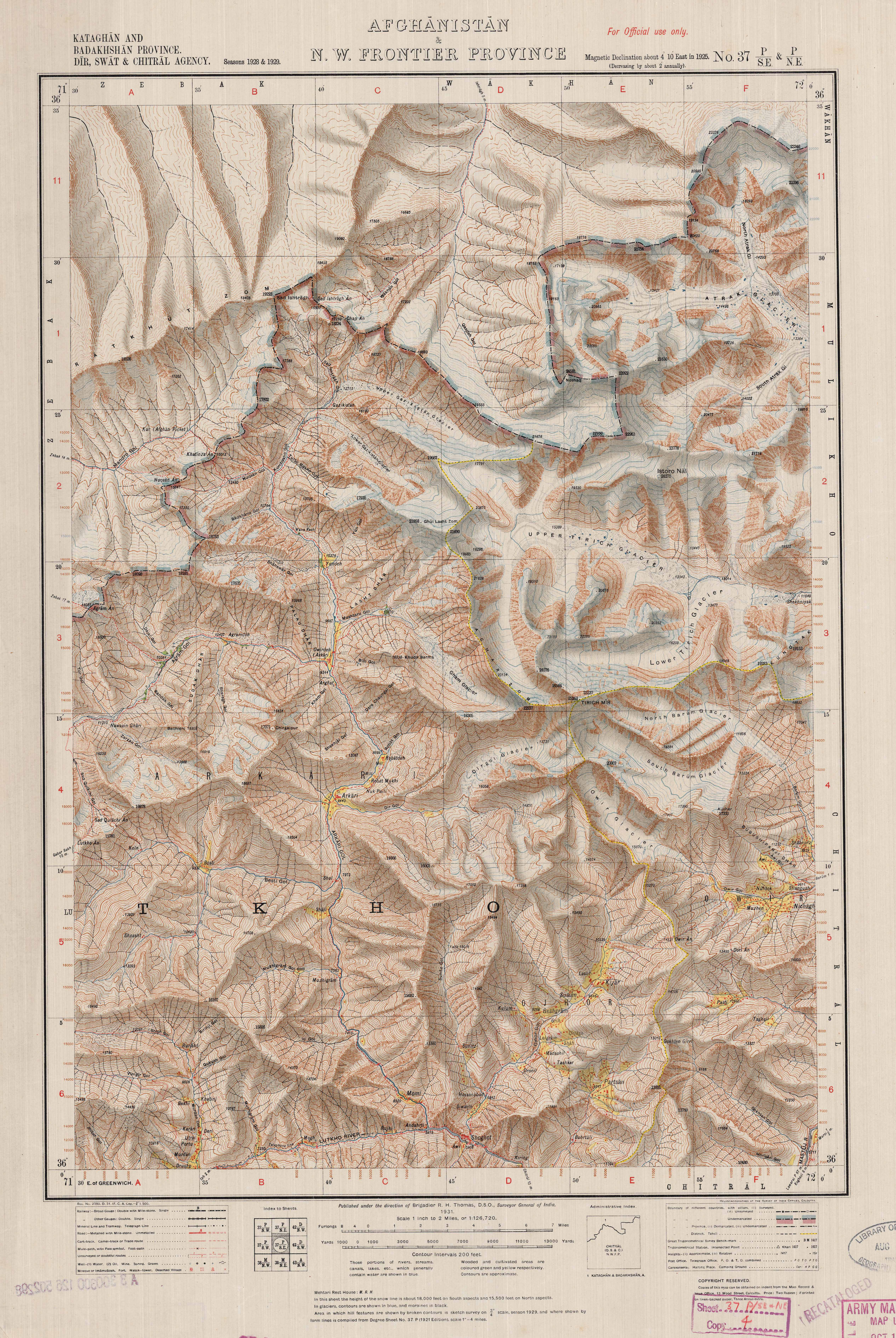
Topographical map of Terich Mir, 1931

== Etymology ==
The name "Terich Mir" consists of two words terich and mir. Terich is the valley in which mountain peak is located while mir (sometimes spelled mer) means mountain in the Khowar language. Georg Morgenstierne gives its derivation from two Sanskrit words *tirīca and meru (lit. 'peak'). While the meaning of *tirīca is less clear, one interpretation translates it as "snow mountain". Several scholars have identified Terich Mir with the sacred Mount Meru mentioned in the Hindu, Buddhist and Jain literature since Vedic period.

== Folklore ==
According to the polytheist Kalash people who live nearby, this mountain is the domain of the goddess Krumai. She appears in the form of a wild goat, and she is associated with childbirth. In one legend, she disturbed the other gods, and was chased by Imra, who threw her into a fast river. Krumai jumped up the river and ran up the cliff, causing the cliff's shape with her hooves. She revealed her true form and prepared a feast for the other gods, and they accepted her into their pantheon.

The Chitrali people, who are Muslim, instead believe that this mountain is the home of fairies and their fortress. No one may climb it, as doing so will bring death to the trespasser. These mountain fairies are known as "Bohtan Doyak", the "stone throwers".

== See also ==
- Akhlan Terich
- Khyber Pakhtunkhwa
- List of mountains in Pakistan
- List of highest mountains on Earth
- List of Ultras of the Karakoram and Hindu Kush

== Books ==
- Keay, John, "The Gilgit Game": The Explorers of the Western Himalayas, 1865-95, Oxford University Press, 1985, ISBN 0-19-577466-3
- Robertson, Sir George Scott, The Kafirs of the Hindukush, Oxford University Press, (1896, OUP edition 1986), ISBN 0-19-577127-3
