= Karun Kuh =

Six-thousander in the Karkoram

Karun Kuh قارون کوہ
- Karun Koh
- Location within Gilgit Baltistan Location within Pakistan

Highest point
- Elevation: 6,977 m (22,890 ft)
- Prominence: 2,240 m (7,350 ft)
- Listing: Ultra
- Coordinates: 36°36′36″N 75°04′51″E

Geography
- Location: Gilgit–Baltistan, Pakistan
- Parent range: Karakoram

Karun Kuh (Urdu: قارون کوہ) is a mountain located in the area of Shimshal Valley, a valley in the Karakoram range of Asia. Located in the area of Shimshal, Gilgit–Baltistan, Pakistan, it has a summit elevation of 6,977 m above sea level.

== See also ==
- List of mountains in Pakistan
- List of ultras of the Karakoram and Hindu Kush
