= John Stokes (mountaineer) =

British soldier and mountaineer

John Henry Stokes MBE BEM (28 August 1945 – 10 January 2016), known as 'Brummie' Stokes, was a British Army soldier and mountaineer, known for his successful summit of Everest in 1976.

== Personal life ==
Stokes was born in 1945 in Hamstead, then a mining village straddling the border of South Staffordshire and Birmingham, England, hence his nickname of 'Brummie'.

His autobiography, Soldiers & Sherpas, A Taste For Adventure, was published in 1988.

He died in January 2016, and was survived by his wife, Lynn, and their two sons.

== Military service ==
At the age of seventeen, Stokes joined the Royal Green Jackets, an infantry regiment of the British Army. Three years later, he joined the SAS Regiment.

With the SAS he saw action in the Falklands War. He left the army in 1985. He was awarded a British Empire Medal for his nineteen years' work in the Special Air Service. He was well liked by all his fellow Soldiers.

== Mountaineering ==
Stokes took part in an expedition to Nuptse in 1975, in which four members of the team died. The next year, during a British Army expedition to Everest in 1976, he reached the summit along with fellow SAS colleague Michael Lane. Stokes lost all his toes and part of each foot to frostbite. Nonetheless, Stokes became only the third Briton to conquer Everest. In 1984, while climbing on the north face of Everest (having proved himself by climbing Denali in Alaska), an avalanche wiped out advanced base camp, killing one of the members and injuring several others, and Stokes' neck was broken.

After leaving the army, he was part of an attempt to conquer Everest's last unclimbed route, its northeast ridge, accessed through China. Although he succeeded in climbing the ridge, the summit could not be reached due to weather conditions, and Stokes was partially paralysed by cerebral oedema.

== Charity work ==
In 1991, with his wife, Stokes established and ran the 'Taste for Adventure Centre', a registered charity and outdoor activity centre for less privileged children, at Credenhill. He was made a Member of the Order of the British Empire (MBE) for this work in 2004.

== Bibliography ==
- Soldiers & Sherpas, A Taste For Adventure. Michael Joseph Ltd. 1988. ISBN 978-0718131197.

== See also ==
- List of 20th-century summiters of Mount Everest
