= Barwangsan =

Mountain in South Korea

Balwangsan

Highest point
- Elevation: 1,458.1 m (4,784 ft)
- Coordinates: 37°36′25″N 128°40′15″E

Geography
- Location: South Korea

Korean name
- Hangul: 발왕산
- Hanja: 發旺山
- RR: Barwangsan
- MR: Parwangsan

Balwangsan (Korean: 발왕산) is a mountain in Pyeongchang County, Gangwon Province, South Korea. It has an elevation of 1,458.1 m (4,784 ft).

== See also ==
- List of mountains in Korea
