= Asian Championships of Ski Mountaineering =

Multinational ski mountaineering competitions

Asian Championships of Ski Mountaineering as multinational ski mountaineering competitions for participants of the Asian continent have been held since 2007.

The 2007 Asian Championship was organized by the Japan Mountaineering Association (JMA), and was sanctioned by the International Council for Ski Mountaineering Competitions (ISMC).

The second edition followed in China two years later, in 2009, after the Asia Ski Mountaineering Federation (ASMF) was born. It was officially sanctioned by the International Ski Mountaineering Federation (ISMF), which emerged from the ISMC in 2008. At this edition a vertical race and a relay race were added. So that the few female ski mountaineers could also participate in the relay race event, the teams were mixed with one female and three male racers.

The third edition, which was the second ISMF sanctioned Asian Championship, was carried out by the Korea Alpine Federation, South Korea, just in 2012, because the World Championship, which was originally planned for 2012 was moved to 2011.

== Asian championships ==
Edition	Year	Host city	Country	Events
1	2007	Nagano	Japan	
2	2009	Jilin	China	
3	2012	Gangwon	South Korea	
	2024	Jilin	China	

- http://www.ismf-ski.org/www/?q=content/ismf-race-calendar
