= Česen =

Česen is a Slovene surname. Notable people with the surname include:

- Aleš Česen (born 1982), Slovenian mountaineer
- Tomo Česen (born 1959), Slovenian mountaineer
