= Latok group =

Mountain group in the Karakoram range

Latok group لیٹوک
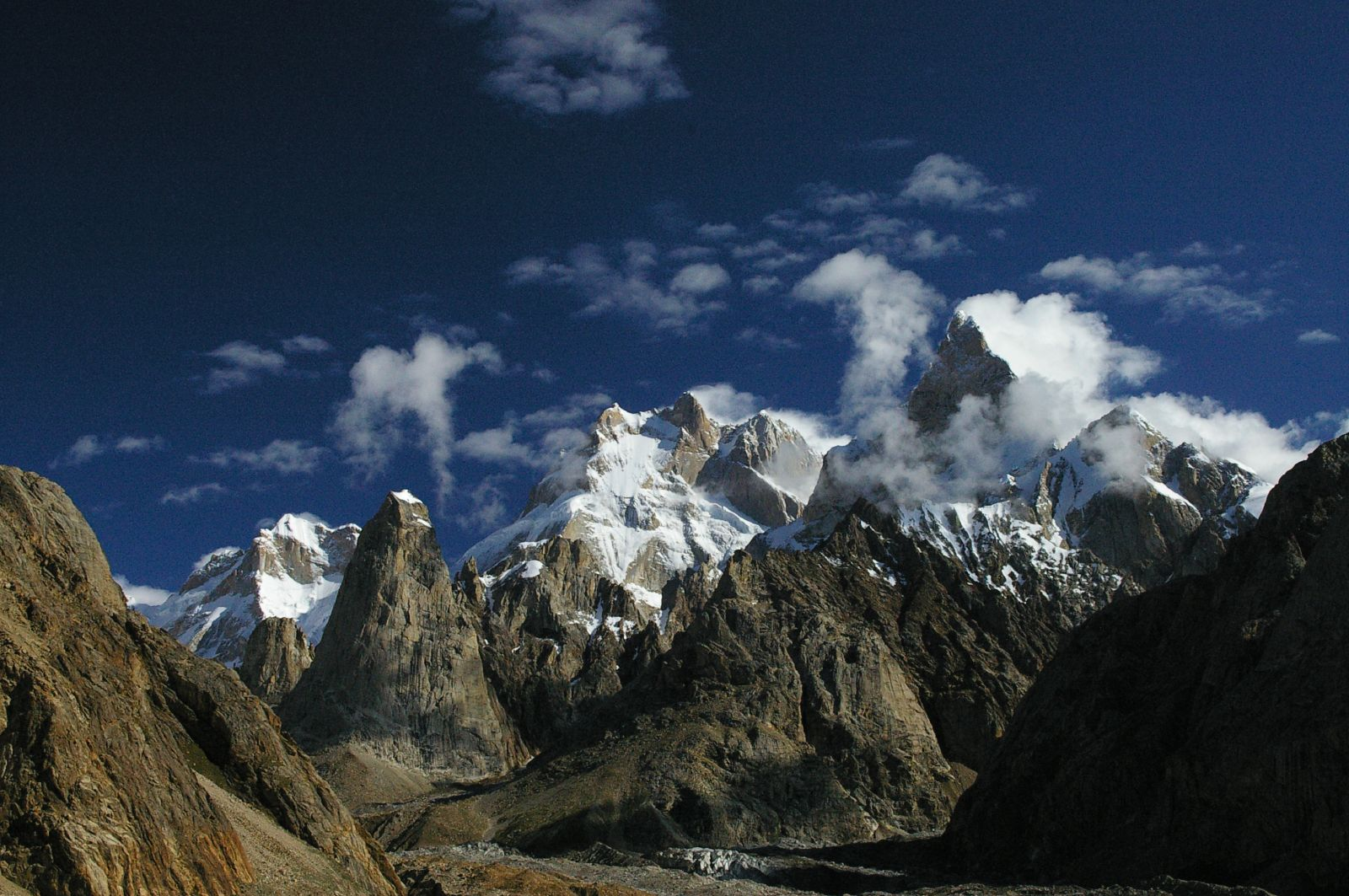
- Latok Peaks and the Ogres thumb

Highest point
- Elevation: 7,145 m (23,442 ft)
- Prominence: 1,475 m (4,839 ft)
- Coordinates: 35°55′41″N 75°49′21″E

Geography
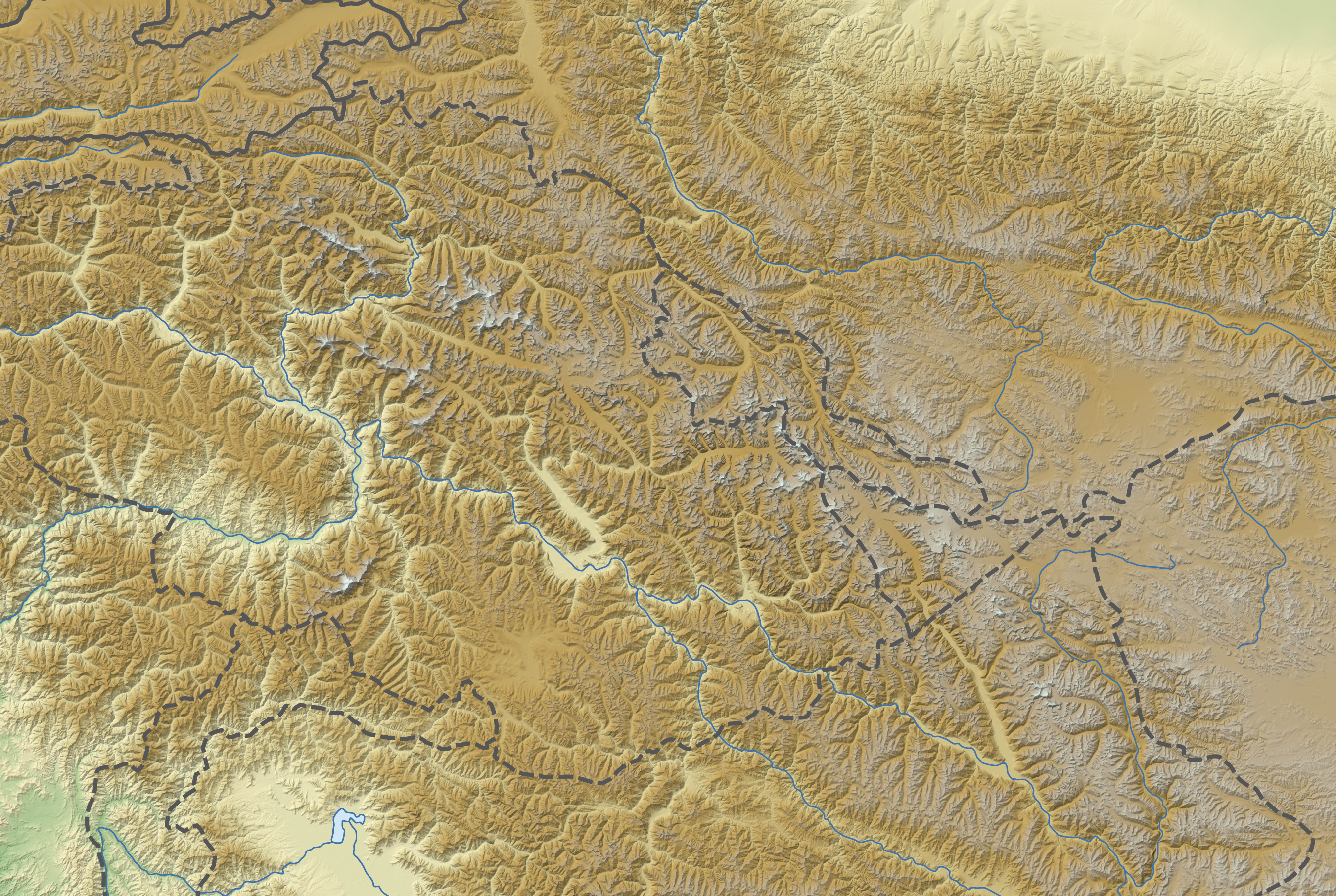
- Location within Karakoram Location within Gilgit Baltistan
- Location: Gilgit-Baltistan, Pakistan
- Parent range: Panmah Muztagh, Karakoram

Climbing
- First ascent: July 19, 1979 by Sin'e Matsumi, Tsuneo Shigehiro, Yu Watanabe
- Easiest route: East Ridge from south side

The Latok group (Note: Urdu: لیٹوک) is a cluster of large and dramatic rock peaks in the Panmah Muztagh, part of the central Karakoram mountain range in Pakistan. They lie just to the east of the Ogre group, dominated by Baintha Brakk. To the immediate south of the Latok group lies the Baintha Lukpar Glacier, a small tributary of the Biafo Glacier, one of the main glaciers of the Karakoram. On the north side flows the Choktoi Glacier.

The Latok range may be best known for Latok I's north ridge wall, which remains unclimbed in its entirety, despite many attempts. The Latok Tuber Belay Device, a piece of climbing equipment popularized by Jeff Lowe, takes its name from the mountain range.

== Latok group ==
The Latok group comprises four main summits, each listed here with its relative position in the group, elevation, and first ascent date:

- Latok I, north-central, 7,145 m, climbed 1979
- Latok II, west, 7,108 m, climbed 1977
- Latok III, east, 6,949 m, climbed 1979
- Latok IV, southeast, 6,456 m, climbed 1980

The Latok group includes several minor peaks, some of which are named for their elevation.

- Latok V (6,190 m) is a minor peak that lies to the far side of Latok IV. The first recorded ascent for this peak was in 2006.
- Peak 5750, southwest of Latok II. First documented summit via the north in 2000, and via the southwest in 2007.
- Peak 5990, near the east face of Uzun Brakk. First documented summit in 2000.
- Peak 5200, near the base of Latok III, on the south side of the Choktoi Glacier. Likely unclimbed, first documented ascent to subsummit in 2007.

== Climbing history ==
All of Latok's summits are notable for their extreme technical difficulty, and they have been the scene of some of the hardest climbing at high altitude anywhere in the world. Of the peaks, Latok II has been summited most frequently.

=== Latok I ===
- First attempt on the North Ridge of Latok I: The North Ridge was first attempted in 1978 by an American expedition consisting of Jim Donini, Jeff Lowe, Michael Kennedy and George Lowe and came within a few pitches of the summit. This climb and successful retreat has fueled continued interest in the mountain.
- First Ascent of Latok I: Latok I was first summited in 1979 by a Japanese expedition led by Naoki Takada; the first summit party comprised Sin'e Matsumi, Tsuneo Shigehiro, Yu Watanabe, and they were followed three days later by Hideo Muto, Jun'ichi Oku, and Kota Endo. They started from the Baintha Lukpar Glacier and climbed a buttress to reach the East Ridge. The steep North Ridge of Latok I, 2,500 m (8,200 ft) high, has not yet been climbed in its entirety.
- 2018 First Ascent of North Ridge: Russian climbers Alexander Gukov (42) and Sergey Glazunov (26) left on July 15 to climb Latok I via the unclimbed North Ridge. They managed to climb to the top of North Ridge, but failed to reach the summit of Latok I. During the descent, Glazunov fell to his death and Gukov was stranded for 7 days in bivouac on the ridge. He was rescued by a Pakistan Army helicopter at 6,100 metres (20,000 ft).
- 2018 First Ascent of Latok I through the North Face: Slovenian climbers Aleš Česen (36), Luka Stražar (29) and British climber Tom Livingstone (27) climbed three-quarters via North Ridge of Latok I (7145m) before traversing the West side and summiting through the original route on 9 August 2018. They made the second ever ascent on the mountain after 1979. The climb was awarded the Piolet d'Or in 2019.

Latok II

Highest point
- Elevation: 7,108 m (23,320 ft)
- Coordinates: 35.9200°N 75.8025°E

Geography
- Location: Northern Areas, Pakistan
- Parent range: Panmah Muztagh, Karakoram

Climbing
- First ascent: 1977 by Ezio Alimonta, Toni Masé, Renato Valentini
- Easiest route: Southeast Buttress

=== Latok II ===
- British Expeditions to Latok II: Unsuccessful British expeditions to Latok II in 1977 and 1978 to climb via the west route resulted in the loss of Pat Fearneough (1978) and Don Morrison (1977).
- First Ascent of Latok II: Latok II saw its first ascent in 1977, by an Italian group led by Arturo Bergamaschi. This was the first successful ascent in the group. They climbed the southeast face of the peak, and Ezio Alimonta, Toni Masé and Renato Valentini made the summit.
- 1997 Expedition on Latok II: A notable next ascent of Latok II came in 1997, when Alexander Huber, Thomas Huber, Toni Gutsch, and Conrad Anker climbed the sheer West Face of the peak. They described as putting "El Capitan on top of Denali": a 1,000 m (3,300 ft) vertical rock wall with a base at 6,100 m (20,000 ft) elevation. The total vertical for the climb was 2,200 m (7,200 ft).
- 2006 American Alpine Style Ascent: After making a first ascent on Latok V, Doug Chabot, Mark Richey, and Steve Swenson summited Latok II in alpine style on 21 August 2006. It was the fourth successful summit of the peak.
- 2009 Spanish Expedition: Álvaro Novellón and Óscar Pérez made the first complete ascent of the northwest ridge. Pérez was lost on the descent after becoming incapacitated after a fall. Despite mobilizing an international rescue effort, Pérez could not be found, and the search was called off.
- 2023 Spanish Expedition: Mountaineers Miquel Mas and Marc Subirana climbed a new route on the Southwest Face of Latok II, which they later named Latok Thumb (6,380m).

Latok III

Highest point
- Elevation: 6,949 m (22,799 ft)
- Coordinates: 35.9204°N 75.8396°E

Geography
- Location: Northern Areas, Pakistan
- Parent range: Panmah Muztagh, Karakoram

Climbing
- First ascent: July 15, 1979 by Yoji Teranishi, Kazushige Takami, Sakae Mori
- Easiest route: Southwest Ridge

=== Latok III ===
- First Ascent of Latok III: The first ascent of Latok III came in 1979, by a Japanese team under the leadership of Yoji Teranishi. They climbed the Southwest Ridge, and the summit party were Teranishi, Kazushige Takami, and Sakae Mori.
- 1988 Italian Expedition: The first ascent during "winter conditions", the first alpine style ascent and the second ascent overall was made by Marco Marciano, Enrico Rosso and Marco Forcatura of Club Alpino Italiano, arriving at the summit under heavy snow on 20 June 1988. This was the first repeat ascent of any peak in the group.
- 1998 West Face Expedition: A team of Jay Smith, Kitty Calhoun, Steve Quinlan and Ken Sauls made an attempt at summiting Latok III via the unclimbed West Face. After ten days, the team reached a high point of 6,000m.
- 2001 Russian West Face Expedition: As the six-member expedition team climbed capsule style to 6,200 m, a large rockfall broke loose from the summit, cutting the climber's rope and causing team member Igor Barikhin to fall to his death. The summit attempt was abandoned.
- 2005 Alpine Style Third Ascent: A Spanish team of Álvaro Novellón and Óscar Pérez climbed via the southwest ridge in alpine style, without fixed ropes. The entire roundtrip climb took seven days.
- 2007 Second Alpine Style Ascent: Julien Herry and Roch Malnuit made the second alpine-style ascent of Latok III, arriving at the summit on 15 September 2007.
- 2011 Russian West Face Expedition: The previous unclimbed west face of Latok III was summited by Evgeny Dmitrienko, Ivan Dozhdev, Alex Lonchinsky, and Alexander Odintsov on 25 June 2011. The climb required 63 pitches to ascend the 2,000m west face. Odintsov had spent 11 years and three expeditions to summit the peak.

Latok IV

Highest point
- Elevation: 6,456 m (21,181 ft)
- Coordinates: 35.89503°N 75.86248°E

Geography
- Parent range: Panmah Muztagh

Climbing
- First ascent: 18 July 1980 Koji Okano and Motomu Omiya
- Easiest route: South Summit, 6450m

=== Latok IV ===
- 1976 Japanese attempt on Latok IV: resulted in the death of a climber.
- 1980 Sangaku Doshikai expedition: Japanese expedition consisting of Koji Okano, Hisashi Handa, Tsutomu Tagusari, Motomu Omiya, and expedition lead Dr. Masaki Noda resulted in the first successful summit of the main peak by Okano and Omiya. On the descent, Okano and Omiya fell into a crevasse with serious injuries. Omiya was trapped for four days after breaking a leg and losing a boot. On his way to camp he was rescued by a British team climbing in the area. The team went back and successfully rescued Okano who had been trapped in the crevasse for eight days.
- 2009 Czech expedition: Jiri Pliska and Ondrej Mandula made a new route nearly to the top of the southwest ridge, but were prevented from the summit due to poor weather.

=== Latok V ===
- Japanese South Face Expeditions: Motomu Omiya, who made the first ascent of Latok IV in 1980 made four unsuccessful attempts on the summit via the South Face in 1999, 2000, 2003 and 2004, reaching within 70 metres of the summit.
- American Latok Expedition: Doug Chabot, Mark Richey, and Steve Swenson made the first recorded ascent of Latok V on 21 August 2006.

=== Biacherahi Towers ===
The Biacherahi Towers are a group of three granite towers rising from the Choktoi Glacier opposite and to the north-west of the Latok range. Their altitudes range from 5700-5900m.

- The North tower, 5,880 m (19,290 ft) was first climbed, in July 1999, by a Scottish expedition. Nineteen years later, in May 2018, the French free-riders Hélias Millerioux and Yannick Graziani set out with six other skiers and snowboarders on a 150km ski tour of the area. During the trip Millerioux skied down the east face of the North Tower with another team member. The documentary Zabardast records the expedition and the descent of the North Tower (which is shown on the film's publicity shots).
- Thomas Huber, Miquel Mas and Víctor Sans claimed the first ascent of The Central Tower, 5,700 m (18,700 ft) with their 600m, 21-pitch, route Wild Soul (5.12 A2+) climbed in August 2026. The Central Tower has three summits and previous reported ascents had reached the slightly lower southern summit whereas the Huber route reached the higher northern summit.
- The first recorded ascent of the The South Tower, 5,800 m (19,000 ft) was made in 1989. The Spanish climbers Jon Lazkano Agirre and Javier Mugarra established a 20-pitch route, rated 6a+ and A3+, up the c550m south-east face. They named the peak the Violeta Peak.

== Climbing casualties ==
- Latok I: (2009) Oscar Perez, Spanish. (2018) Sergey Glazunov, Russian.
- Latok III: (2001) Igor Barikhin, Russian.
- Latok IV: (1976) unnamed, Japanese.
