= Gasherbrum IV =

Mountain in Pakistan

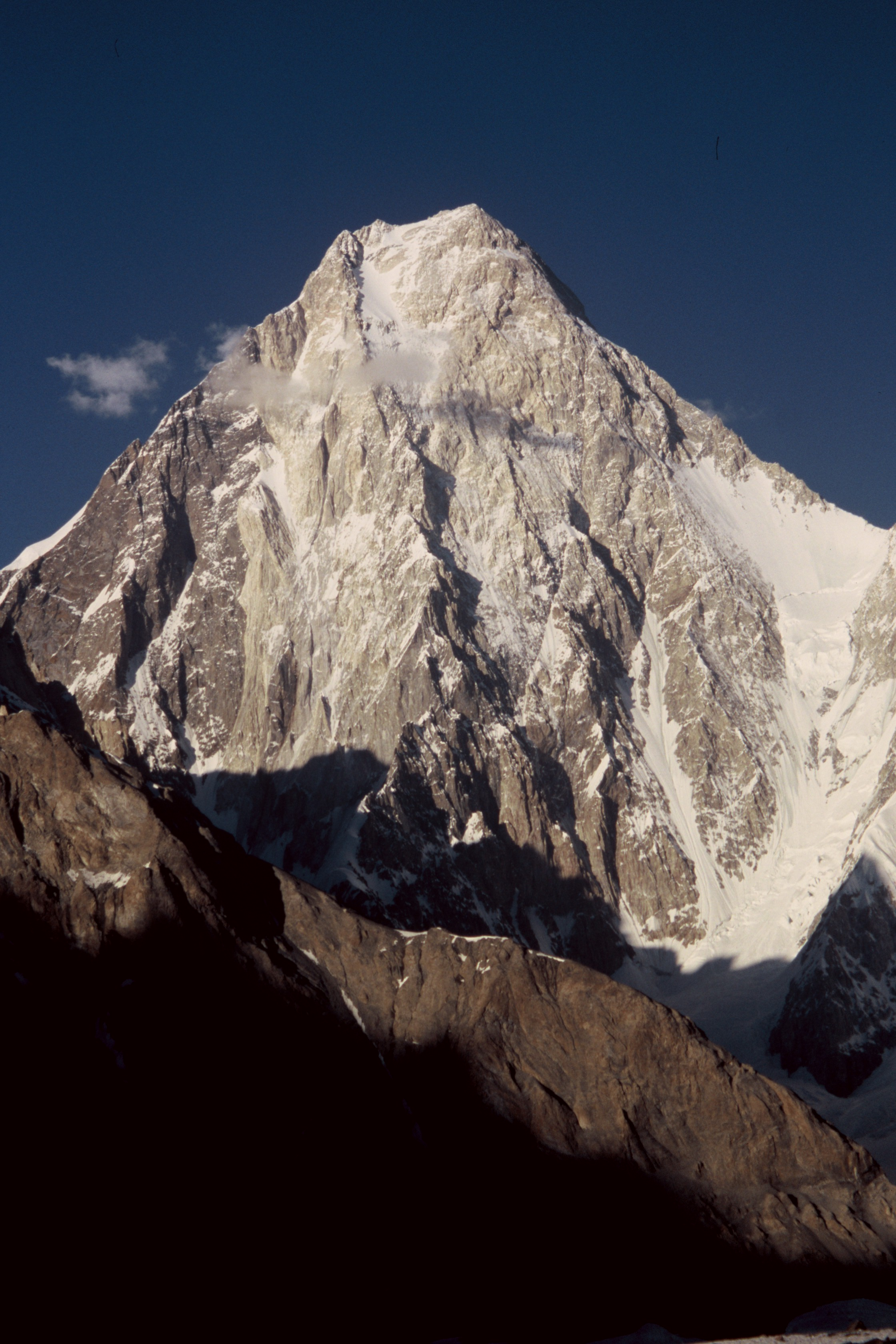
- Gasherbrum IV's West Face, seen from Baltoro Glacier

Highest point
- Elevation: 7,925 m (26,001 ft); Ranked 17th
- Prominence: 718 m (2,356 ft)
- Coordinates: 35°45′30″N 76°37′0″E

Geography
- Location within Pakistan Location within Gilgit Baltistan
- Location: Gilgit-Baltistan region, Pakistan
- Parent range: Baltoro Muztagh, Karakoram

Climbing
- First ascent: August 6, 1958 by Walter Bonatti and Carlo Mauri
- Easiest route: Northwest Ridge

Gasherbrum IV
- Traditional Chinese: 加舒爾布魯木IV峰
Transcriptions

Gasherbrum IV, (Note: Urdu: گاشر برم ۔ ۴; Balti: རྒ་ཥཱ་བྲུམ་། - ༤, romanized: rgasha brum - 4, lit. 'Beautiful Mountain -4'; simplified Chinese: 加舒尔布鲁木IV峰; traditional Chinese: 加舒爾布魯木IV峰; pinyin: Jiāshūěrbùlǔmù IV Fēng) originally surveyed as K3, is the 17th highest mountain on Earth and the 6th highest in Pakistan, as well as the highest independent mountain under eight thousand metres in Pakistan.

One of the peaks in the Gasherbrum massif, its immense West Face looms over the glacial junction of Concordia. The Name "Gasherbrum" is often claimed to mean "Shining Wall", presumably a reference to this face's tendency to reflect the rays of the setting sun, but in fact it comes from "rgasha" (beautiful) and "brum" (mountain) in Balti, hence it actually means "beautiful mountain."

Despite its lower height relative to the surrounding eight-thousanders, Gasherbrum IV is a venerated challenge among mountaineers.

== Features ==
Seen on approach from the Baltoro Glacier, Gasherbrum IV serves as the western anchor for the main arc of the Gasherbrum range. Carved by glaciers, it is a huge, steep fin of marble and limestone, wider on its western and eastern sides and narrowing considerably toward its col with Gasherbrum VII in the south.

From the South Gasherbrum Glacier, a steep, dangerous icefall separates it from Gasherbrum III, and, by extension, the rest of the massif. While the 1958 route of first ascent climbed into the cirque above to reach the Northeast Ridge, and a handful of abortive attempts on the 900-meter East Face have accessed it, it has never been successfully repeated due to ever-increasing hazards from falling ice and rock. While fleetingly visible from the flanks of the two 8000-meter giants immediately to the north, the glaciated North Face, sequestered in one of the least-visited parts of the Chinese Karakoram, is barely documented and has never been attempted.

Mountaineers often agree that the most famous part of the peak is its West Face, which usually has clear visibility while climbers trek into the heart of the Baltoro Muztagh. Although a significant goal for elite alpinists, not every expedition to reach the top of this wall has continued on to the highest point at the south end of the summit ridge; while surmounting the wall is regarded as a coveted prize unto itself, true summit rates on this extremely difficult peak are consequently even lower as a result. To date, the East and South Faces and South and Southeast Ridges of Gasherbrum IV have repelled all climbing attempts, some fatally.

== Notable ascents and attempts ==
Year	Climbers	Summited?	Description
1958	(Italy) Walter Bonatti (Italy) Carlo Mauri	Yes	First ascent. An Italian expedition led by Riccardo Cassin via the Northeast Ridge and the North Summit. Traversing the pinnacled ridge to the main summit was considered the crux of the climb.
1980	(United States) Craig McKibben (United States) Steve Swenson	No	First attempt of ascent via the East Face was unsuccessful due to weather conditions.
1982	(Japan) Koichi Takebe (Japan) Hiroyuki Shirasawa (Japan) Hirokazu Nishioka (Japan) Shigetoshi Tada (Japan) Tomoyoshi Usaka	No	Three of the five climbers fall to their deaths on the West Face after a serac fall at 6,100 meters. Shigetoshi Tada is able to help the injured Tomoyoshi Usaka descend safely, and nearby expeditions come to the survivors' aid.
1985	(Poland) Wojciech Kurtyka (Austria) Robert Schauer	Yes (North Summit)	First ascent of the 2,500 m high West Face. Bad weather, depletion of food and fuel, and extreme exhaustion forced them to stop at the north summit. The climb was called the "most remarkable alpine-style ascent of the 20th century" and cited in support of Kurtyka's 2016 Piolets d'Or Lifetime Achievement Award.
1986	(United States) Greg Child (Australia) Tim Macartney-Snape (United States) Tom Hargis	Yes	First ascent of the Northwest Ridge, involving an open bivouac on the north summit. This was the second ascent of Gasherbrum IV.
1993	(Japan) Yasushi Yamanoi	No	Unsuccessful ascent attempt via the East Face.
1995	(Slovenia) Miroslav "Slavko" Svetičič	No	Died while attempting a solo climb of the West Face. His body was later discovered at 7000 meters by the 1997 Korean team.
1996	(South Korea) Kim Chang-ho (South Korea) Lim Saeng-muk	No	Attempted to summit via the East Face. Climb was abandoned after reaching about 7,400 m due to avalanche warning.
1997	(South Korea) Bang Jung-ho (South Korea) Kim Tong-kwan (South Korea) Yoo Huk-jae	Yes	First complete ascent via the West Face by a Korean team, via the central spur. Reached the summit after a sieged ascent quoted as 5.10 A3.
1999	(South Korea) Kang Yeon-ryong (South Korea) Yun Chi-won	Yes	Second ascent of the Northwest Ridge as part of a 13-member Korean team.
2008	(Spain) Alberto Iñurrategi (Spain) Juan Vallejo (Spain) José Carlos Tamayo (Spain) Mikel Zabalza (Spain) Ferran Latorre	No	Third ascent of the Northwest Ridge by a Spanish team. Did not reach the main summit, stopped at a minor peak a short distance from the true summit.
2012	(France) French Expedition	No	Attempting a summit of the "Shining Wall" on the West Face was abandoned mid-route due to an avalanche.
2016	(Slovenia) Aleš Česen (Slovenia) Luka Lindič	Yes (North Summit)	Reached the North Summit via the Northwest Ridge on July 26th. Intended to summit via the West Face, but weather conditions and heavy snow altered their route. This was the fourth successful ascent of the Northwest Ridge.
2018	(Germany) David Göttler (Italy) Hervé Barmasse	No	Expedition to climb the Southwest Face was abandoned midway due to poor weather.
2018	(Spain) Oriol Baro (Spain) Roger Cararach (Spain) Iker Madoz (Spain) Marc Toralles	No	Spanish expedition abandoned their summit attempt due to bad weather. Planned to reach the summit via the still unclimbed South Pillar.
2018	(Italy) Italian Expedition	No	Aimed to replicate the first ascent by Italians Walter Bonatti and Carlo Mauri on the sixtieth anniversary. Ended in tragedy as Maurizio Giordano was hit by falling ice and killed on the descent.
2023	(Russia) Sergey Nilov (Russia) Dmitry Golovchenko	No	Expedition via a completely unknown route up the southeast ridge ended in tragedy as Golovchenko was lost in a fall.
2024	(Russia) Sergey Nilov (Russia) Mikhail Mironov (Russia) Sergei Mironov	No	Attempt to recover Golovchenko's body ended tragically as a serac fell on the team. Expedition leader Sergei Nilov was reported missing and climbers Mikhail and Sergei Mironov were injured.

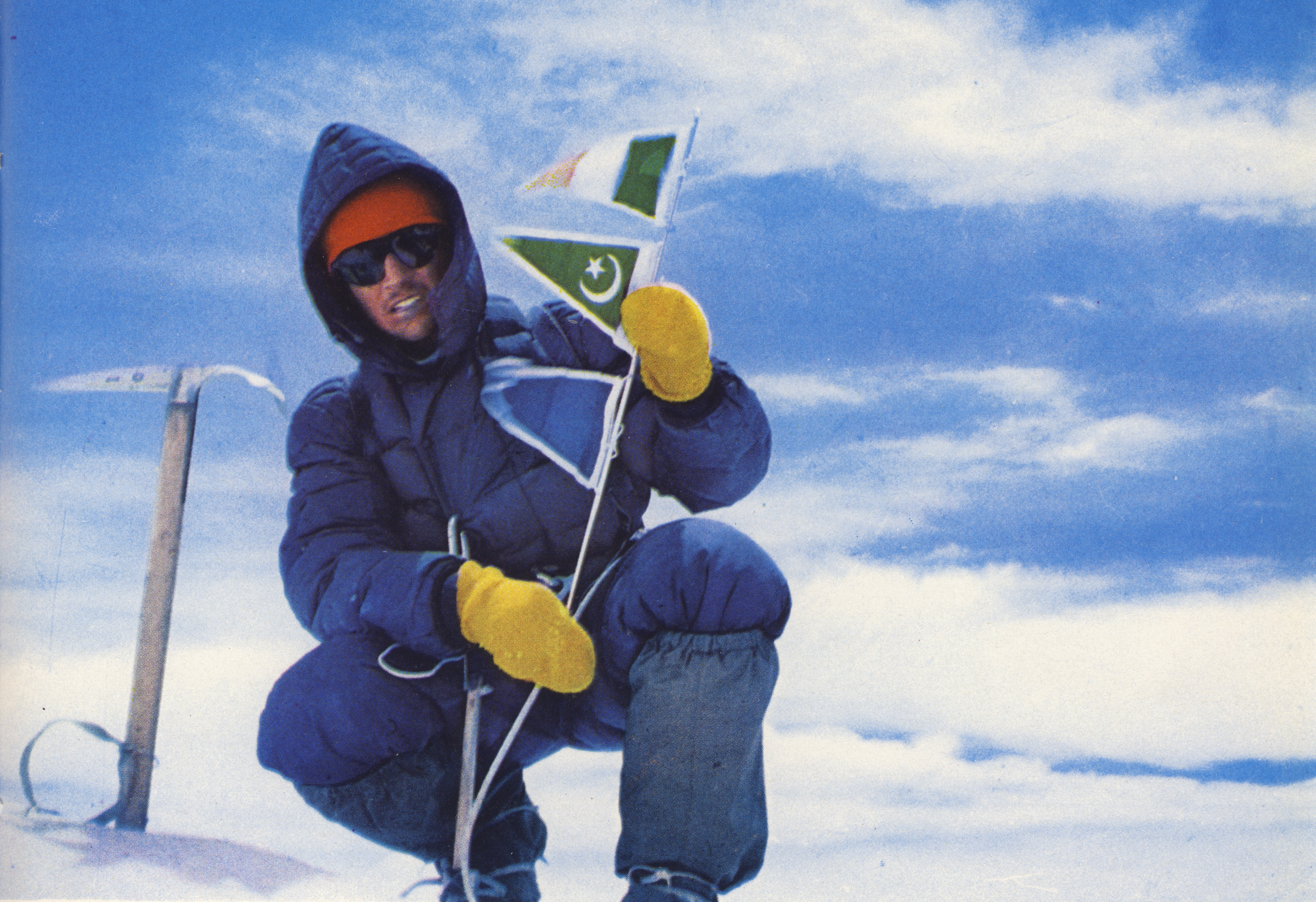
Walter Bonatti on the Gasherbrum IV summit during first ascent in 1958

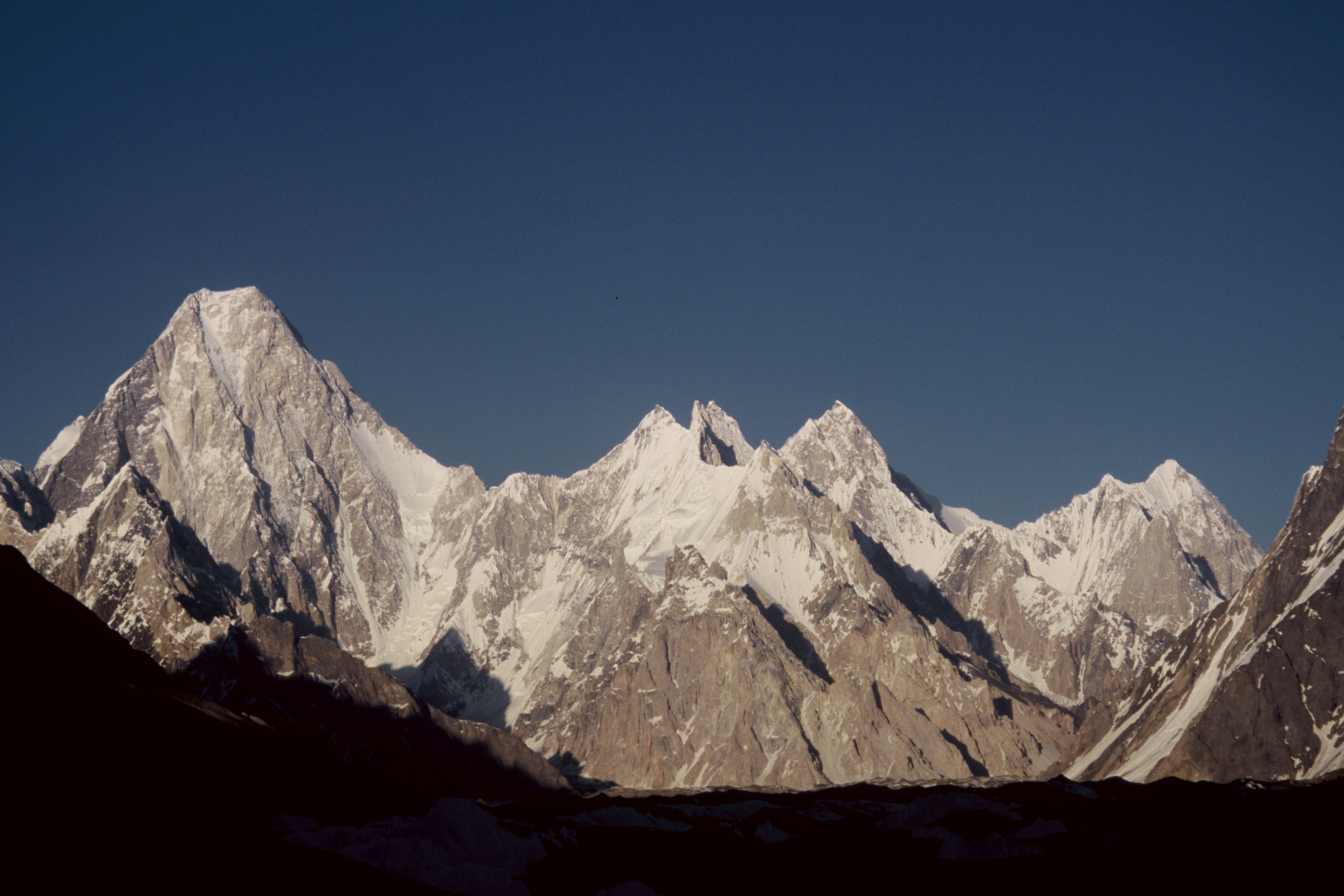
Left to right: Gasherbrum IV, VII, V, VI

== See also ==
- List of mountains in Pakistan
- List of highest mountains
