= Piolets d'Or =

International mountaineering award

Les Piolets d'Or
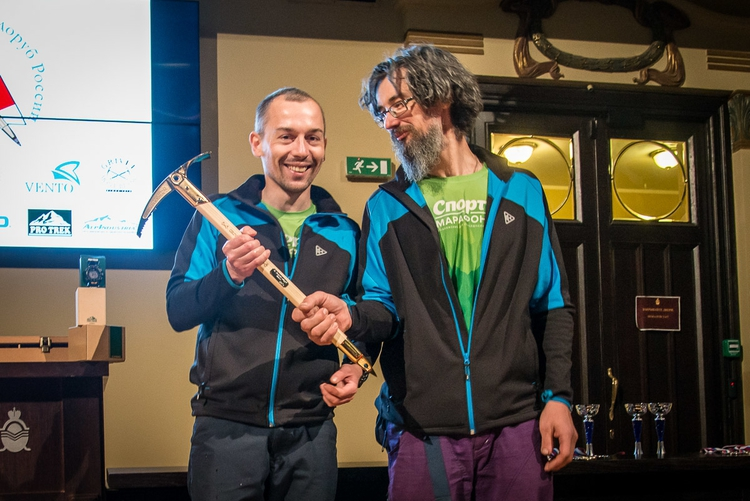
- 2017 winners Dmitry Golovchenko and Sergey Nilov with their "Golden Ice Axe"
- Awarded for: Mountaineering ascents with emphasis on style, spirit and creativity, self-sufficiency, and technical difficulty
- Date: Spring (1992 to 2017); Autumn (2018 onward)
- Location: France (1992 to 2007); France/Italy (2009 to 2017); Various (2018 onward)
- Presented by: Groupe de Haute Montagne
- Formerly called: Le Piolet d'Or (pre-2009)
- Rewards: A single Golden ice axe (per team), made by Grivel
- First award: 1992 (for ascents in 1991)

Highlights
- Most awards: Paul Ramsden (2003, 2013, 2016, 2017, 2023) (As at the 2023 awards)
- Website: Piolet d'Or

The Piolets d'Or ([pjɔ.lɛ dɔʁ], "Golden Ice Axes") is an annual mountaineering and alpine climbing award organized by the Groupe de Haute Montagne (GHM), and previously with co-founder Montagnes Magazine, since its founding in 1992. Golden ice axes are presented to the annual winners at a weekend awards festival based on their achievements in the previous year. It is considered mountaineering's highest honor and is referred to as the "Oscars of mountaineering".

The Piolets have progressed from being a competition-like single-award event (Le Piolet d'Or) into a broader celebration of mountaineering and alpinism, with several awards made (Les Piolets d'Or). After a crisis in 2008, the Charter for the awards was rewritten to focus on the style and innovation of the nominations, respect for the mountain, environment, and future climbing generations, and to increase the independence and transparency of the award process; the official name was also changed to the plural.

== History ==
At the start of the 1990s, it was difficult to raise funds for major mountaineering expeditions in France. The French Federation of Mountaineering and Climbing could no longer fund expeditions (as it had done since the French Annapurna expeditions). Alpinist Jean-Claude Marmier, then president of the Groupe de Haute Montagne (or GHM), suggested an annual prize for "outstanding achievement in the world of alpinism" might increase the public profile (and thus sponsorship) of French mountaineering. He won the support of Guy Chaumereuil, then editor of the Grenoble-based French monthly climbing and mountaineering magazine, Montagnes, and in 1992 GHM and Montagnes announced the first Piolet d'Or award for the best alpine ascent of 1991 at the Autrans Mountain Film Festival.

From the outset, there was some concern over the ethics of rewarding and promoting the dangerous undertaking of modern extreme alpine climbing. After a controversial 1998 Piolet was awarded to a Russian team of which two had died on the route, the rules were changed the following year so that nominees had to have completed their climbs safely. The New York Times remarked on the proportion of Piolet d'Or winners who have subsequently died while mountaineering, but that the awards criteria had been further amended over time to emphasize "style" over pure "risk-taking".

There was also a concern, particularly within the alpine climbing community, on the decision to select a single winner from a list of alpine ascents. The situation came to a head during the 2007 Piolet d'Or awards over accusations by then GHM president, Leslie Fuscko, that Chaumereuil had imposed the shortlist, which led to the resignation of Jury President Andrej Štremfelj. Further controversy occurred when Marko Prezelj, a 2007 Piolet d'Or winner, wrote a public article criticizing the premise of the awards, and whether it was possible, or ethical, to have a single winner.

The 2007 controversy led to a fundamental re-think of the structure of the awards, a long process that required the 2008 awards to be canceled. A new Charter was drawn up and the 2009 Piolet d'Or, the 17th awards, followed a very different format; multiple winners were announced (initially under different headings, but the headings were later dropped), a new "Lifetime Achievement Award" was announced (some awards were accused as being such an award in disguise), and the first female winner was announced. Jury President Doug Scott heralded the post-2008 Charter, saying: "This edition signals the rebirth of the Piolets d'Or. For us there are no winners, no losers. The honored are the ambassadors of an art, a passion."

In 2013, the jury embraced the new Charter awarding Piolets to all six shortlisted nominees, an act that drew criticism from Montagnes. Since 2015, the winners have been announced in advance of the ceremony to emphasize that the ceremony was "a not a competition, but a celebration". In 2016, two of the award's biggest critics, Voytek Kurtyka and Marko Prezelj accepted their awards at the 2016 Piolets d'Or ceremony at La Grave; where only GHM remained from the original founders. In 2018, for the first time in its history, none of the award ceremony was held in France, when the Piolet d'Or ceremony was held at the Mountain Festival in Lądek-Zdrój, Poland. The awards in 2019 and 2020 were also presented at the festival in Lądek-Zdrój. The 2019 awards were overshadowed by the recent deaths of two of the three winners, David Lama and Hansjörg Auer.

=== Multiple winners ===
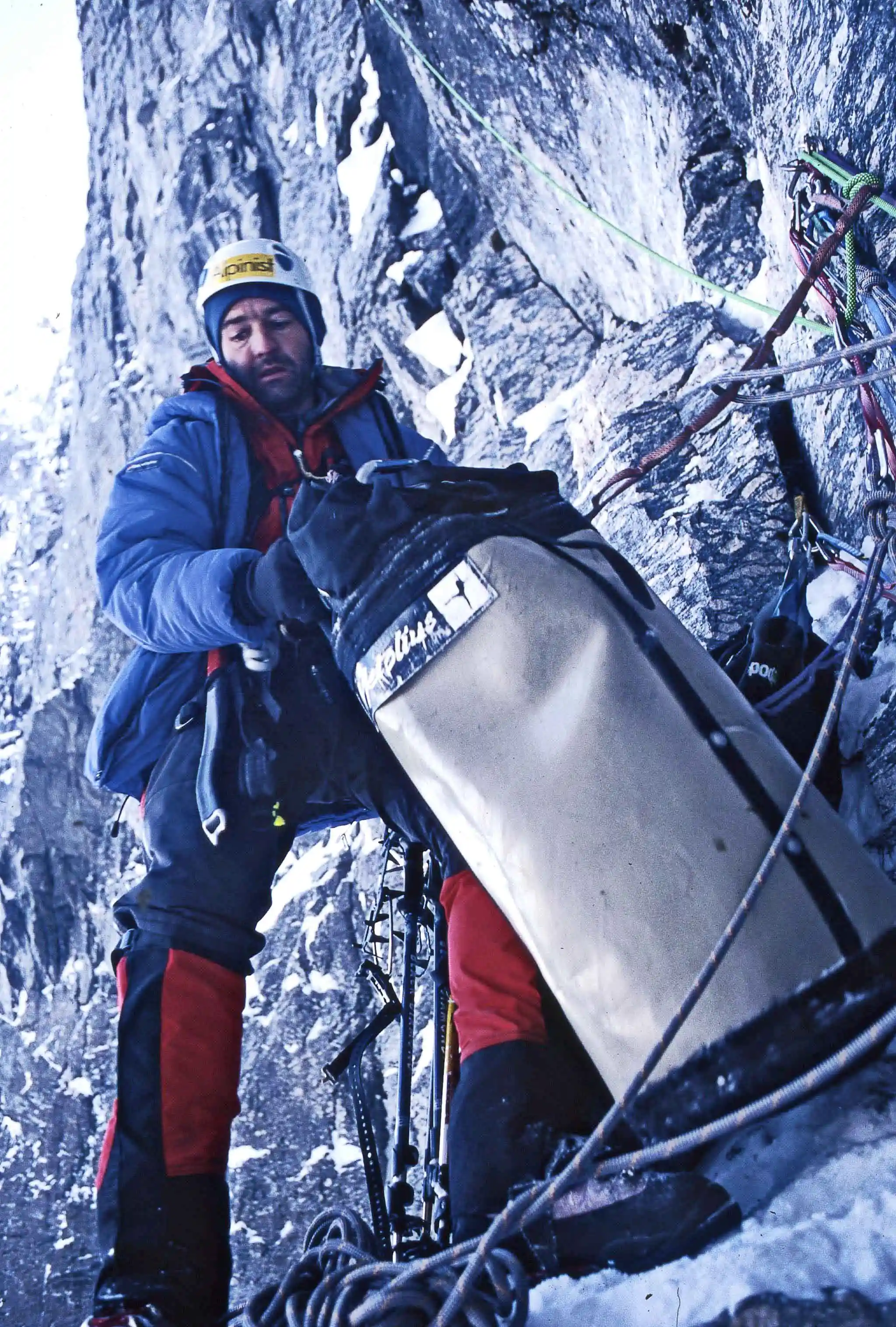
Paul Ramsden, Troll Wall, Norway

The following climbers have won more than one Piolet d'Or since its inception in 1992:

- 5 times. Paul Ramsden (2003, 2013, 2016, 2017, 2023).
- 4 times. Marko Prezelj (1992, 2007, 2015, 2016), Kazuya Hiraide (2009, 2018, 2020, 2024).
- 3 times. Mick Fowler (2003, 2013, 2016), Kenro Nakajima (2018, 2020, 2024).
- 2 times. Valery Babanov (2002, 2004), Aleš Česen (2015, 2019), Dmitry Golovchenko (2013, 2017), Zdenek Hák (2018, 2020), Marek Holeček (2018, 2020), Sergey Nilov (2013, 2017), Sean Villanueva O'Driscoll (2011, 2022), Mark Richey (2012, 2020), Ueli Steck (2009, 2014), Luka Stražar (2012, 2019), Steve Swenson (2012, 2020), Hayden Kennedy (2013, 2016), Ethan Berman (2021, 2026).

== Criteria ==
Post 2008, a new Charter was drafted to clarify the basis and values for deciding awards:

In modern mountaineering, questions of style and means of ascent take precedence over reaching the objective itself. It is no longer a matter of employing huge financial and technical resources (bottled oxygen, fixed ropes, high-altitude porters, so-called 'performance-enhancing' substances…) and large numbers of people to reach the top at all costs. The Piolets d’Or throw the spotlight on imaginative and innovative new routes, using a minimum amount of equipment, and building on experience.

— Piolet d'Or Charter, 2008.

In addition, the Charter laid out the specific criteria under which all future nominees would be assessed:

- Style of ascent.
- Spirit of exploration: original (previously unclimbed) route and/or mountain, creative and innovative approach.
- Level of commitment and self-sufficiency.
- High level of technical ability required.
- Suitability of route in light of objective dangers.
- Efficient and sparing use of resources.
- Transparency regarding the use of these resources.
- Respect for people, climbing partners, members of other teams, porters, and local agents.
- Respect for the environment.
- Respect for future generations of mountaineers by leaving them the possibility of enjoying the same kind of experiences and adventures.

The new Charter also underlined that awards, and the ceremony, should be a "celebration of mountaineering", and not a "climbing competition". The term "winners", and even the term "award", was downplayed in favor of terms such as "nominees". In 2014, National Geographic said of the revised Piolet charter: "The Piolet d’Or is about sharing our experiences as alpinists with a wider audience, trying to learn about the human experience through adventure. The era of the heroic warrior climber who climbs themselves literally to death in the high mountains is over."

== Reception ==
The Piolet d'Or is the highest honor in mountaineering and alpine climbing. In 2021, the New York Times described it as "Alpinism's biggest prize", and that even though it had some vocal critics, it had widespread support amongst the climbing community. On receiving a Piolet in 2015, Alex Honnold told National Geographic, "I've always joked that if I won a Piolet d’Or I'd retire from climbing ... and I do think it’s appropriate to honor some climbs for pushing the sport in positive directions. Whether our ascent is deserving or not is open to debate, that’s fine. But people definitely climb inspiring things every year and I think it’s worth celebrating that in some way." They are often called the "Oscars of mountaineering".

=== Criticism ===
Over the years, a number of climbers have openly criticized and even rejected awards/or asked not to be considered:

- In 2005, British climber Ian Parnell, who was nominated on several previous occasions, asked for his nomination to be withdrawn to allow what he considered to be superior American ascents to be shortlisted; in 2006, Parnell wrote a lengthy critique of the awards in Alpinist, and concluded "The Piolet d'Or is certainly here to stay; in fact, its recent controversy has elevated its profile ..."
- In 2006, Italian climbers Alessandro Beltrami, Rolando Garibotti, and Ermanno Salvaterra asked their ascent of the north face of Cerro Torre not be considered, saying: "It was the essence of the experience that interested us most. An award such as the Piolet d'Or tries to quantify this essence and attempts to judge the quality of the experience.... How could there be any real value to such a subjective judgment? How to judge elusive concepts like elegance and imagination?" In 2008, Garibotti also asked the jury not to consider the Torre Traverse he completed with Colin Haley.
- In 2007, multiple award winner Marko Prezelj publicly rejected the award on stage to express his opposition to competition in alpinism; Prezelj then wrote a brutal critique of the awards in Alpinist magazine, that finished with the line: "I apologize if I have offended anyone who is addicted to Miss Fame; she gets around so watch out for STDs." After the new Charter in 2009, Prezelj would later reconcile himself with the awards, and accepted his 3rd Piolet in 2015 in Chamonix, and his 4th Piolet d'Or in 2016 at the ceremony in La Grave.
- In 2010, Polish climber Wojciech Kurtyka declined the invitation to accept the newly created "Lifetime Achievement Award" by GHM President Christian Trommsdorff, saying "I always had a sense of escaping to the mountains from everyday social bullshit, and now you propose to me to take part in it." Kurtyka was even more forceful in declining it in 2011 and 2012, saying: "Sorry. NO. NO! I will not be talking about Piolets d’Or anymore." However, in 2016, Kurtyka accepted the 8th "Lifetime Achievement Award" at the ceremony in La Grave.

== 2026 award (34th awards) ==
The 2026 Piolet d'Or winners were announced in October 2026 by a 6-person technical jury consisting of Lise Billon, Jordi Corominas, Luka Lindič, Young Hoon Oh, Paul Ramsden and Enrico Rosso.

- Peter Habeler won the Lifetime Achievement Award.
- Southeast pillar of Ultar Sar, Batura Muztagh, via Shooting the Moon (3,100m, M5 WI4), by Ethan Berman, Maarten van Haeren and Sebastián Pelletti.
- Northwest face of Aikache Chhok, Batura Muztagh, via Secrets, Shepherds, Sex and Serendipity (3,000m, M7 A2+ AI5), by George Ponsonby and James Price.
- East spur and east ridge via The Essence of Commitment (1,400m, 6c+ M6+ 95°) to the main summit of Yerupajá, Cordillera Huayhuash, Peru, by Bru Busom, Rubén Sanmartín and Marc Toralles.
- Jannu East, Kangchenjunga Himal, via Le Sommet des Pieux (2,300m, M6 WI5) on the north face and east ridge, by Nicolas Jean and Benjamin Védrines.
- "Special Mention for Female Mountaineering" to Tiphaine Dupérier.

== 2025 award (33rd awards) ==
The 2025 Piolet d'Or winners were announced in October 2025 by a 7-person technical jury consisting of Ethan Berman, Aymeric Clouet, Young Hoon Oh, Ines Papert, Enrico Rosso, Jack Tackle, and Mikel Zabalza.

- Alexander Odintsov won the Lifetime Achievement Award.
- First Ascent of Yashkuk Sar via the Tiger Lily Buttress (2,000m AI5+ M6 A0) in Batura Muztagh by August Franzen, Dane Steadman, and Cody Winckler.
- First ascent of the west ridge of Gasherbrum III via the Edge of Entropy (3,000m) in Batura Muztagh by Aleš Česen and Tom Livingstone.
- First ascent of the southwest arête (1,670m 5.10 A0 M7 WI5) of Kaqur Kangri by Spencer Gray and Ryan Griffiths.
- "Special Mention" for the first ascent of Lalung I via the east ridge (2,000m M6+ AI5+) by Anja Petek and Patricija Verdev. Piolet d’Or notes that before this party, none of the Lalung peaks had a documented first ascent.

== 2024 award (32nd awards) ==
The 2024 Piolet d'Or winners were announced in October 2024 by a 7-person technical jury consisting of Lise Billon, Jack Tackle, Mikel Zabalza, Genki Narumi, Toni Gutch, Aleš Česen, and Enrico Rosso.

- Jordi Corominas won the 16th Lifetime Achievement Award.
- North face (Secret Line) of Terich Mir by Kazuya Hiraide and Kenro Nakajima.
- North face and northwest ridge (Round Trip Ticket) of Jannu (2,700m, M7 AI5+ A0, 5 days) in the Kangchenjunga Himal by Matt Cornell, Jackson Marvell, and Alan Rousseau.
- North face (Tomorrow Is Another Day) of Flat Top (1,400m, ED, 5c A2 WI4 M6) in the Kishtwar Himalaya by Hugo Béguin, Matthias Gribi, and Nathan Monard.
- "Special Mention" for the first ascent of the west face (Diamonds on the Soles of the Shoes) on Kabru South by Romano Benet and Nives Meroi. Noted as 'most notable new route at altitude by a party involving a female alpinist.

== 2023 award (31st awards) ==
The 2023 Piolet d'Or winners were announced in October 2023 by a 7-person technical jury consisting of Lise Billon, Ines Papert, Nikita Balabanov, Ales Česen, Martin Elias, Genki Narumi and Jack Tackle.

- George Lowe won the 15th Lifetime Achievement Award.
- South-southeast spur (Reino Hongo) of Jirishanca (1,000m, M7 AI5+ 3-days, alpine style) in the Cordillera Huayhuash by Alik Berg and Quentin Roberts.
- North face (Phantom Line) of the Jugal Spire (1,300m, ED, 5-days) in the Jugal Himal, Nepal, by Tim Miller and Paul Ramsden (5th Piolet).
- South face (The Crystal Ship) of Pumari Chhish East (1,600m, 5.10+ M7 A2, 5-days) in the Hispar Muztagh by Christophe Ogier, Victor Saucède and Jérôme Sullivan.
- "Special Mention" for the first ascent of the East face (Via Sedna) of the Northern Sun Spire (780m, 6b to 7b+) in East Greenland by Capucine Cotteaux, Caro North, and Nadia Royo; noted as 'minimal carbon footprint' expedition that used sailing boats.

== 2022 award (30th awards) ==
The 2022 Piolet d'Or winners were announced in October 2022 by a 6-person technical jury consisting of Conrad Anker, Alex Bluemel, Genki Narumi, Paul Ramsden, Patrick Wagnon, and Mikel Zabalza:

- Silvo Karo won the 14th Lifetime Achievement award.
- Northwest face of Saraghrar (7,340m, ED2 5.10 A3+ M5+, 8-days, alpine style) in Hindu Kush, Pakistan, by Georgians Archil Badriashvili, Baqar Gelashvili, and Giorgi Tepnadze.
- Moonwalk Traverse of the Cerro Chaltén Group (South-to-North, 5,000-metres, 10 summits, 5-days, rope solo) in Patagonia, by Sean Villanueva O'Driscoll (2nd Piolet)
- "Special Jury Award" for the Southeast Ridge (Patience) of Annapurna III (7,555m, 5.10a A3 M6, 16-days) in Nepal, by Ukrainians Mykyta Balabanov, Mykhailo Fomin, and Viacheslav Polezhaiko.

== 2021 award ==
The 2021 Piolet d'Or winners were announced in October 2021 by a 6-person technical jury consisting of Ines Papert, Kelly Cordes, Victor Saunders, Valery Babanov, and Helias Millerioux:

- Yasushi Yamanoi won the 13th Lifetime Achievement award.
- Emperor face (Running in the Shadows) of Mount Robson (2,500m, VI M6 AI5 A0, 2-days, alpine style) in the Canadian Rockies, by American Ethan Berman and Briton Uisdean Hawthorn.
- South face and southwest ridge (Revers Gagnant) of Sani Pakkush (2,600m, M4+ WI 4+, 2-days, alpine style) in the Tolltar Valley, Pakistan, by French climbers Pierrick Fine and Symon Welfringer.
- "Special Mention" for Catalan climber Silvia Vidal for her "cutting edge big wall solo ascents around the world".

== 2020 award ==
The 2020 Piolet d'Or winners were announced in August 2020 by an 8-person technical jury consisting of Kazuaki Amano, Nikita Balabanov, Aleš Česen, Gerlinde Kaltenbrunner, Helias Millerioux, Enrico Rosso, Victor Saunders and Raphael Slawinski.

- Catherine Destivelle won the 12th Lifetime Achievement award.
- Northwest face (the UFO Line) of Chamlang (2,500m, WI5 M6, 6-days, alpine style) in Nepal, by Czech climbers Marek Holeček (2nd Piolet) and Zdeněk Hák (2nd Piolet).
- West face (Release The Kraken) of Tengi Ragi Tau (1,600m, AI5 M5+, 4-days, alpine style) in Nepal, by American climbers Alan Rousseau and Tino Villanueva.
- South face and southeast ridge of Rakaposhi (4,000m, 6-days, alpine style) in Pakistan, by Japanese climbers Kazuya Hiraide and Kenro Nakajima (2nd Piolet).
- Southeast face of Link Sar (2,300m, AI4 M6+, 8-days) in Pakistan, by American climbers Mark Richey (2nd Piolet), Steve Swenson (2nd Piolet), Chris Wright, and Graham Zimmerman.

== 2019 award (deaths of Lama and Auer) ==
The 2019 Piolet d'Or winners were announced in July 2019 by a 7-person technical jury consisting of Sandy Allan, Kazu Amano, Valeri Babanov, Jordi Corominas, Fred Degoulet, Ines Papert, Andrej Štremfelj; for a second time the awards were held at the Ladek Mountain Festival, but were overshadowed by the recent deaths of two of the winners, David Lama and Hansjörg Auer.

- Krzysztof Wielicki won the 11th Lifetime Achievement Award.
- West ridge and the first ascent of Lunag Ri (1,500m, 2-days, solo) on the border of Tibet and Nepal, by recently deceased Austrian climber David Lama; his award was accepted by his family.
- West face and the first ascent of Lupghar Sar West (1,000m, M4, 1-day, solo) in the Hispar Muztagh, by recently deceased Austrian climber Hansjörg Auer; his award was accepted by his friends.
- North ridge and South face of Latok I (2,500m, ED+, 8-days) in the Karakoram, by Slovenian climbers Aleš Česen (2nd Piolet) and Luka Stražar (2nd Piolet), and British climber Tom Livingstone.

== 2018 award (leaves France) ==
The 2018 Piolet d'Or winners were announced at the new later time of August 2018 by a 7-person technical jury consisting of Valeri Babanov, Kelly Cordes, Jordi Corominas, Mick Fowler, Yannick Graziani, Silvo Karo, and Raphael Slawinsky; it was also announced that the ceremony would be held at the Ladek Film Festival in Poland, the first time there was no French ceremony.

- Andrej Štremfelj won the 10th Lifetime Achievement award.
- Southwest face (Satisfaction!) of Gasherbrum I (2,600m, ED+ WI5+ M7, 8-days) in Pakistan, by Czech climbers Marek Holeček and Zdeněk Hák.
- Northeast face and traverse of Shispare (2,700m, WI5 M6, 7-days, alpine style) in Pakistan, by Japanese climbers Kazuya Hiraide and Kenro Nakajima.
- South face of Nuptse Nup II (2,200m, WI6 M5+, 8-days, alpine style) in Nepal, by French climbers Frédéric Degoulet, Benjamin Guigonnet and Hélias Millerioux.
- "Special mention" for the southwest face of Nilkantha (1,400m, WI5 M6 A0, 5-days) in India, by American climbers Chantel Astorga, Anne Gilbert Chase, and Jason Thompson.
- "Special mention" to Alex Honnold for outstanding contribution to climbing throughout the 2017 year.

== 2017 award ==
The 2017 Piolet d'Or winners were announced in April 2017 by an 8-person technical jury consisting of Kazu Amano, Valery Babanov, Hervé Barmasse, Kelly Cordes, Andy Houseman, Thomas Huber, Sebastien Ratel, and Raphael Slawinski.

- Jeff Lowe won the 9th Lifetime Achievement award.
- North buttress and the first ascent of Nyainqentangla South East (1,600m, ED+) in Tibet, by British climbers Paul Ramsden (4th Piolet), and Nick Bullock.
- North buttress of Thalay Sagar (1,400m, ED2, M7 WI5 5.10a A3, 8-days) in Gangotri, India, by Russian climbers Dmitry Golovchenko (2nd Piolet), Dmitry Grigoriev, and Sergey Nilov (2nd Piolet).
- "Special mention" for the south face of Gangapurna (1,500m, ED+) in Nepal, by Korean climbers Cho Seok-mun, Kim Chang-ho, and Park Joung-yong.
- "Special mention" for the Travesia del Torre Cerro Torre Group (1,600m, 5.10c, C1, 1-day) in Patagonia, by American climbers Colin Haley and Alex Honnold.

== 2016 award ==
The 2016 Piolet d'Or winners were announced in April 2016 by a 9-person technical jury consisting of Valeri Babanov, Hervé Barmasse, Seb Bohin, Simon Elias, Yasuhiro Hanatani, Silvo Karo, Michael Kennedy, Victor Saunders, and Raphael Slawinski. After several years of lobbying, Wojciech Kurtyka agreed to accept a "Lifetime Achievement Award".

- Wojciech Kurtyka won the 8th Lifetime Achievement award.
- North-northwest pillar (Daddy Magnum Force) of Talung (1,700m, ED+ M6 A3, 5-days, alpine style) on the Nepalese-Indian border, by Ukrainian climbers Mikhail Fomin and Nikita Balabanov.
- North face and the first ascent of Gave Ding (1,600m, ED+, 5-days, alpine style) in Nepal, by British climbers Mick Fowler and Paul Ramsden (3rd Piolet for each).
- Northwest pillar (Hasta las Webas) of Cerro Riso Paron (1,000m, ED-, AI5+ M5, 3-days) in Patagonia, by French Jerome Sullivan, Lise Billon, and Antoine Moineville, and Argentine Diego Simari.
- East face (Light before Wisdom) of Cerro Kishtwar (1,200m, ED+, 5.11 WI6 M6 A2, 3-days) in the Indian Himalayas, by an international climbing team of Marko Prezelj (Slovenia; 4th Piolet), Hayden Kennedy (USA; 2nd Piolet ), Manu Pellissier (France), and Urban Novak (Slovenia).

== 2015 award (pre-announced) ==
The 2015 Piolet d'Or winners were announced in March 2015 by a 9-person technical jury consisting of Kazuki Amano, Valeri Babanov, Hervé Barmasse, Stephane Benoist, Andy Houseman, Michael Kennedy, Ines Papert, Raphael Slawinski, and Andrej Štremfelj; in a departure from previous years, the winners were announced before the ceremony so the event was "not a competition, but a celebration". National Geographic noted that Alex Honnold's Piolet was the first to a climber who had never previously led an ice climb.

- Chris Bonington won the 7th Lifetime Achievement award.
- Southwest face (Shy Girl) of Thamserku (1,620m, M4/M5, A2, 8-days, alpine style) in Nepal, by Russian climbers Aleksander Gukov and Aleksey Lonchinskiy.
- North face of Hagshu (1,350m, ED, 2-days, alpine style) India, by Slovenian climbers Aleš Česen, Luka Lindič, and Marko Prezelj (3rd Piolet).
- Fitz Traverse of the Cerro Chaltén Group (North-to-South and opposite of the Moonwalk Traverse, 5 km, 8-peaks, up to 5.11d C1, 4-days, alpine style) in Patagonia, by American climbers Tommy Caldwell and Alex Honnold.

== 2014 award ==
The 2014 Piolet d'Or winners were announced in March 2014 by a 6-person technical jury consisting of George Lowe, Denis Urubko, Catherine Destivelle, Erri De Luca (the Italian writer), Karen Steinbach, and Lim Sung-muk; in a compromise, the jury decided to award two Piolet awards out of the six shortlisted ascents.

- John Roskelley won the 6th Lifetime Achievement award.
- South face of Annapurna (2,700m, 28-hours, solo climb) in Nepal, by Swiss climber Ueli Steck (2nd Piolet); the provenance for this ascent was questioned, but upheld by witnesses.
- Northwest face and west ridge of K6 (2,700m, 5-days, alpine style) in Pakistan, by Canadian climbers Ian Welsted and Raphael Slawinski.

== 2013 award (everybody wins) ==
The 2013 Piolet d'Or winners were announced in April 2013 by a 4-person technical jury consisting of Stephen Venables, Silvo Karo, Katsutaka Yokoyama, and Gerlinde Kaltenbrunner; in an unprecedented move, the jury announced that the entire short-list of six nominated ascents would receive a Piolet d'Or. Montagnes magazine issued a statement condemning the decision saying that it: "weakens the event and its status, blurs the image of mountaineering in the eyes of the public and does not reflect the true personality of mountaineers who make history".

- Kurt Diemberger won the 5th Lifetime Achievement award.
- South pillar (Nima Line) of Kyashar (2,200m, 5.10a A0 M5, 7-days) in Nepal, by the Japanese climbers Tatsuya Aoki, Yasuhiro Hanatani, and Hiroyoshi Manome.
- Northwest buttress (Prow of Shiva) of Shiva (6-days, ED+, alpine style) in Himachal Pradesh, India, by British climbers Mick Fowler and Paul Ramsden (2nd Piolet for each).
- Northeast spur of Muztagh Tower (18-days, semi-Alpine style) in Pakistan, by Russian climbers Dmitry Golovchenko, Alexander Lange, and Sergey Nilov.
- South face (The Torch and The Brotherhood) of Ogre I (5.9X AI5 M6R) in Pakistan, by American climbers Hayden Kennedy and Kyle Dempster.
- Southwest face (Spicy Game) of Kamet (2,000m, ED-: 5.10-, alpine style), Uttarakhand, India, by French climbers Sébastien Bohin, Didier Jourdain, Sébastien Moatti, and Sébastien Ratel.
- Mazeno Ridge of Nanga Parbat (13 km traverse, 18-days) in Pakistan, by Scottish climbers Sandy Allan and Rick Allen.
- "Special recognition" was made of Hayden Kennedy and Jason Kruk's fair-means ascent of Compressor Route on Cerro Torre, and David Lama and Peter Ortner's first free ascent of the line.

== 2012 award (20th awards) ==
The 2012 Piolet d'Or winners were announced in March 2012 by a 6-person technical jury consisting of Michael Kennedy, Valeri Babanov, Alberto Iñurrategi, Ines Papert, Liu Yong, and Alessandro Filippini (Italian journalist). The event was held in France and Italy and two Piolets were awarded from the short-list of 6 ascents, as well as a "Special mention".

- Robert Paragot won the 4th Lifetime Achievement Award.
- Southwest face (The Old Breed) and the first ascent of Saser Kangri II East (1,700m, WI4 M3, 4-days) in Eastern Karakoram in India, by American climbers Mark Richey, Steve Swenson, and Freddie Wilkinson; at the time, it was the second highest unclimbed peak in the world (after Gangkhar Puensum, which is closed to climbing).
- Northwest face (Sanjači zlatih jam) of K7 West (1,600m, VI/5, M5, A2, 6-days) in the Karakorum, by Slovenian climbers Nejc Marcic and Luka Strazar.
- "Special mention" for the south face of Torre Egger (950m, 6b+ A1 AI6, 2-days) in Patagonia, by Norwegian climbers Bjørn-Eivind Årtun and Ole Lied.

== 2011 award ==
The 2011 Piolet d'Or winners were announced in April 2011 by a 6-person technical jury consisting of Greg Child (Jury President), Enrico Rosso, Yannick Graziani, Simon Anthamatten, Michael Pause (German journalist), and Hiroshi Hagiwara (Japanese journalist); underlying the "new post-2008 Charter" for assessing ascents, the winners were very diverse expeditions underlining the "spirit of Alpinism".

- Doug Scott won the 3rd Lifetime Achievement Award.
- Southwest face (I-TO) of Mount Logan (2,500m, ED+, WI5 M6, 5-days, ultra-lightweight alpine style) in Canada, by Japanese climbers Yasushi Okada and Katsutaka Yokoyama.
- Sean Villanueva O'Driscoll, Nicolas Favresse, and Olivier Favresse (Belgian), Ben Ditto (USA), and Bob Shepton (UK) for their "Greenland Big Walls" expedition.

== 2010 award ==
The winners of the 2010 Piolet d'Or were announced in Chamonix (France) and Courmayeur (Italy) from 8–10 April 2010 by a 6-person technical jury consisting of Andrej Štremfelj (Jury President), Jordi Corominas, Lindsay Griffin (British journalist), Anna Piunova (Russian journalist), Robert Schauer, and Kei Taniguchi. In a break with tradition, Christian Trommsdorff, chairman of Piolets d'Or organizer Groupe de Haute Montagne, said at the ceremony that the winners exemplified the new post-2008 Charter, while the other nominees did not make the cut. Also at the ceremony, Reinhold Messner was supportive of the new Charter, saying: "Alpinism starts where tourism stops. Today's trade routes on the 8000-meter peaks—climbed by commercial expeditions using fixed ropes, camps and Sherpas—are pure tourism that has nothing to do with alpinism. The Piolet d'Or celebrates alpinism."

- Reinhold Messner won the 2nd Lifetime Achievement Award.
- Southeast face of Cho Oyu (2,600m, M6 6b A2/3) in Nepal, by Kazakh climbers Denis Urubko and Boris Dedeshko.
- North face of Xuelian (2,650m, M6 WI5 5.7 R) in Chinese Tien Shan, by American climbers Jed Brown and Kyle Dempster, and Scottish climber Bruce Normand.

== 2009 award (new Charter) ==
The Piolet d'or 2009 took place in Chamonix-Mont-Blanc (France) and Courmayeur in the Aosta Valley (Italy) on the 24th and 25 April 2009 by a 6-person technical jury consisting of Doug Scott (Jury President), Dario Rodriguez, Dodo Kopold, Jim Donini, Peter Habeler, and Yong ImDuck. Jury President Doug Scott heralded the new post-2008 Charter, saying: "This edition signals the rebirth of the Piolets d'Or. For us there are no winners, no losers. The honored are the ambassadors of an art, a passion." Jury member Peter Habeler added: "It is not a question of reaching success at all costs, by using financial or technical means (such as oxygen, fixed ropes, Sherpas, doping products etc.…). What counts is the style. Today even if the summit hasn't been reached, the expedition can be honoured if it is innovative." In a new departure, three winners were announced under the headings of "Spirit of Exploration", "Commitment", and "Technical Difficulty" (this explicit sub-categorization would not be repeated in the future), a new "Lifetime Achievement Award" was created with Bonatti as the first recipient, and the first female Piolet winner, Kei Taniguchi, was announced.

- Walter Bonatti won the first Lifetime Achievement Award.
- North face (Checkmate) or Tengkampoche (2,000m, M7, WI5 5.10 A0) in the Khumbu Valley in Nepal, by Swiss climbers Ueli Steck and Simon Anthamatten; for "Technical Difficulty" award.
- Southwest face (Samurai Direct) of Kamet (1,800m, M5+, WI5+, 12-days) in India, by Japanese climbers Kazuya Hiraide and Kei Taniguchi (first female winner); the "Spirit of Exploration" award.
- North face of Kalanka (1,800m, M5) in India, by Japanese climbers Fumitaka Ichimura, Yusuke Sato, and Kazuki Amano; the "Commitment" award.

== 2008 award (cancelled) ==
After the controversy of the 2007 awards, Philippe Descamps, the editor of Montagnes, looked for a wider opinion on how to improve the awards. The three co-founders of the awards, the GHM, Montagnes and Guy Chaumereuil (the editor of Montagnes when the awards were founded), produced a new "Charter", and decided to hold the 2008 ceremony not exclusively in France, as in the past, but south of the border in the Val d'Aosta, in Italy. Concern still lingered over the need for stronger independent jury panels in deciding a winner, and whether there should be just a single winner. These issues could not be resolved easily, and in January 2008, it was announced that the 2008 Piolet d'Or would be canceled while these debates were still in process.

== 2007 award (controversy) ==
The 2007 Piolet d'Or was awarded on 26 January 2007 in Grenoble, France. The awards were marked by controversy from the outset, with accusations by GHM president Leslie Fuscko that the shortlist was imposed by Montagnes magazine, making it a "journalist award". GHM and the president of the jury, Slovenian climber Andrej Štremfelj, resigned from the awards. Further controversy occurred when Marko Prezelj, the co-winner of the 2007 Piolet d'Or, rejected his award and wrote a scathing article criticizing the whole premise of the awards, and whether it was possible, or ethical, to have a single winner, saying: "I don't believe in awards for alpinism, much less trophies or titles presented by the public or the media," and "At the ceremony, I could see and feel the competitive spirit created and fueled by the event's organizers. Most of the climbers readily accepted this mood without understanding that they had been pushed into an arena where spectators thrive on drama, where winner and loser are judged."

The winners were:

- Slovenian climbers Marko Prezelj (2nd Piolet) and Boris Lorencic, for the first ascent of Chomolhari's north-west pillar (2,000m, M6+, 6-days).

The other four shortlisted ascents were:

- Kazakhstan climber Denis Urubko and Sergey Samoilov, for a new route in alpine style on the northeast face of Manaslu; won the 2007 Asian Piolet d'Or.
- Slovenian climber Pavle Kozjek, for a new route, and in 1-day, on Cho Oyu, and for submitting images of the Nangpa La killings; won the 3rd "People's Choice Award".
- Ukrainian climbers Igor Chaplinsky, Andrey Rodiontsev, and Orest Verbitsky for a first ascent on the north ridge of Shingu Charpa (1,500m, elements of 5.11d).
- British climbers Ian Parnell and Tim Emmett for the southeast pillar of Kedarnath Dome (1,500m, elements of 5.11c).

== Pre-2007 (only one winner) ==
The following is the list of annual winners from inception in 1992 to 2006 (there was only one winner in these years).

- 2006 Steve House and Vince Anderson for the rapid light ascent of the Rupal Face of Nanga Parbat; after the controversy of 2006, the jury, and the 2nd "People's Choice Award", were unanimous.
- 2005 Russian team led by Alexander Odintsov for the first direct ascent of the north face of Jannu; a controversial decision given the "heavy-style" siege tactics employed by the Russians, and the initial absence of some major American ascents (Ian Parnell withdrew to enable one through); the audience booed the decision at the ceremony and gave Steve House's "ultra-light" solo of K7 40% of their vote, in the newly created "People's Choice Award" (they gave Russians 5%); later that year, House wrote a strongly critical piece in Vertical Magazine of the jury's decision.
- 2004 Valery Babanov (2nd Piolet) and Yuri Koshelenko for an ascent on the south face of Nuptse.
- 2003 Mick Fowler and Paul Ramsden for a new route on the north face of Siguniang (6250m) in China.
- 2002 Valery Babanov for a solo first ascent of Meru Central (6310m).
- 2001 (10th awards) Thomas Huber and Iwan Wolf for the first ascent of the direct north pillar of Shivling (6543m).
- 2000 Lionel Daudet and Sébastien Foissac for the ascent of the south-east face of the Burkett Needle; the jury controversially passed over Tomaž Humar's attempt to solo the south face of Dhaulagiri, calling it "a step too far" in risk and "heavily slanted toward media coverage", ex-juror Jean-Claude Marmier called Daudet and Foissac's ascent as something seen "two or three times a year in The American Alpine Journal for the last fifty years". The jury defended their choice as "a kind of philosophy of mountaineering, where the [physical] performance is not the only criterion ...".
- 1999 Andrew Lindblade of Australia and Athol Whimp of New Zealand for the first direct ascent of the north face of Thalay Sagar
- 1998 Russian team from Ekaterinburg led by Sergey Efimov for the first ascent of the coveted west face of Makalu; GHM President Jean-Claude Marmier resigned from the jury calling the decision "a real disaster", as the Russians had used "heavy-style" siege-tactics (unlike other unsuccessful "light-style" teams, adhering to the Piolet's ethos), and two of the Russian team were killed.
- 1997 Slovenians Tomaž Humar and Vanja Furlan for a new route on the northwest face of Ama Dablam.
- 1996 Andreas Orgler, Thomas Bonapace, Austria for numerous new routes in the Ruth Glacier area of the Alaska Range and especially a new route on Mount Dickey called „Winebottle“; this award drew some criticism as being akin to a "lifetime achievement award" for Orgler, and not for the specific climbs in 1995.
- 1995 François Marsigny of France and Andy Parkin of England for the new ice and rock route up the Esperance Col on Cerro Torre.
- 1994 The youth high altitude expedition of the French Alpine Club (median age 20 years) for ascents in the Pamir Mountains.
- 1993 Michel Piola and Vincent Sprungli for the ascent of the east face of Torre South del Paine in Patagonia (the name of the route is "Dans l'Oeil du Cyclone").
- 1992 Slovenians Andrej Štremfelj and Marko Prezelj for the south pillar of Kanchenjunga's south summit; the beating of French favorites Pierre Béghin and Christophe Profit, and their "K2 enchainment", was considered a "political decision" so the award was "international", but with the passing of time, the Slovenian ascent is considered a more important milestone.

== See also ==
- Boardman Tasker Prize for Mountain Literature
- Francis P. Farquhar Mountaineering Award
- Snow Leopard award
