= Athol Whimp =

New Zealand mountaineer

Athol Whimp (1961–2012) was a New Zealand mountaineer, rock climber and soldier. Widely regarded as the most accomplished alpinist in New Zealand's modern era, he is the country's only recipient of the prestigious Piolet d'Or award for mountaineering.

Following a successful military career in the New Zealand Special Air Service and a stint as an advisor with a desert reconnaissance unit in Oman, Whimp began climbing extensively in New Zealand, Australia and the Himalaya. During this period, he and Australian climber Andrew Lindblade made a number of difficult ascents culminating in their 1998 alpine-style ascent of the North Face of Thalay Sagar. In addition to his hard alpine ascents, Whimp was also an accomplished rock climber, having climbed up to grade 5.13c in the Yosemite decimal system.

On 23 February 2012, Whimp died after slipping into an 800-meter fall while traversing non-technical terrain in the Darran Mountains.

== Notable ascents ==
- 1994 – Compressor Route, Cerro Torre, Patagonia (with Andrew Lindblade)
- 1994 – Pedrini-Locher Route, Monte Fitz Roy, Patagonia (with Andrew Lindblade)
- 1994 – Ragni Route, Cerro Torre, Patagonia (first solo ascent)
- 1998 – North Face of Thalay Sagar (6904m), Garhwal Himalaya, India (first ascent with Andrew Lindblade), Winner of the Piolet d'Or
- 1999 – South Face of Aoraki / Mount Cook (3754m), New Zealand (solo ascent)
- 2000 – North Face of Jannu (7710m), Nepal (with Andrew Lindblade)
- 2000 – Wall of Shadows (Japanese Route), Jannu, Nepal (7710m) (second ascent with Andrew Lindblade)
- 2003 – Kurtyka-Schauer Route, Gasherbrum IV (7925m), Pakistan. Attempt with Andrew Lindblade. The pair retreated in bad weather at 6800m.
