= The Enormocast =

Climbing podcast by Chris Kalous

The Enormocast is a Carbondale, Colorado-based climbing podcast. Episodes feature interviews with notable climbers, conducted by host Chris Kalous. The podcast began publishing in 2011 and produces approximately two episodes per month.

== History ==
The first episode of The Enormocast was released on December 9, 2011. Host and producer Chris Kalous, besides being a climber and writer, was a house painter who listened to podcasts to pass the time. He became interested in producing his own climbing-related podcast and leveraged his connections with friends and acquaintances in the climbing world to create the first set of episodes. The initial batch of episodes featured several notable climbers who Kalous personally knew, such as Steph Davis, a college acquaintance and mountaineer Hayden Kennedy. According to Kalous, a goal of the podcast was to "demystify climbing while simultaneously building its mythology.” Over time, the popularity of the podcast grew. According to Luke Mehall of The Climbing Zine, The Enormocast went from "an obscure show where the number of beers drank on air matched the listeners, to, dare I say, the most popular form of climbing media out there."

== Style and content ==
Each show, one or a few climbers sit for an approximately one hour long interview. Interviews are conducted in-person at a range of locations, with Kalous noting that, besides poor sound quality, "a face to face vibe is hard to match over distance." According to Outside, "listening to Enormocast feels like being part of an exclusive club for climbers. The interviews get more personal than first ascents and bouldering grades." Guests have included sport, traditional and ice climbers, as well as boulderers. Frequent topics have included mental strategies for climbing, the changing pathways for developing climbers with the advent of gyms and why people climb at all.

Some interviews chronicle first person accounts of important moments or issues in recent climbing history. Shortly after his controversial bolt cutting actions on The Compressor route on Cerro Torre, Patagonia and subsequent arrest, with partner Jason Kruk, Hayden Kennedy discussed his rationale for doing so in a detailed interview on the podcast. Guest Sam Lightner Jr., then President of Friends of Indian Creek, a climbing advocacy organization, discussed issues of land access for climbers. The Enormocast served as a record of the life of Eric Bjornstad, author of Desert Rock and developer of many climbing routes, especially throughout the Southwestern United States, starting in the 1950s. Shortly after recording the interview, Bjornstad passed away. The podcast also conducted in depth interviews with other noted climbers from past climbing eras, like Lynn Hill and Henry Barber.

== Reception ==
In 2016, Outside included it on a list of "eight best outdoorsy" podcasts. Climbing included it among "four favorite podcasts" in 2017, describing it as a "virtual campfire." In 2019, TheClimbingGuy.com picked The Enormocast as the best climbing interview podcast, writing "Kalous examines the climbing lifestyle through subversive discussions and intriguing interviews with top climbers like Alex Honnold and Lynn Hill, as well as glorified tributes to rock warriors of the past." Outside included the podcast in its 2019 list of 15 best outdoor-related podcasts, describing the show as "insidery and gossipy in the best sense."

In a review The Climbing Zine praised The Enormocast for bringing "freshness" to interviews with established figures in the climbing community, while also tackling "modern issues and challenges in the climbing world," but noted that the show "has had its lows as well. Usually ... because the guest is less than engaging."

== Notable guests ==
Selected notable guests of The Enormocast include: Conrad Anker, Tommy Caldwell, Steph Davis, Hazel Findlay, Brette Harrington, Emily Harrington, Hugh Herr, Lynn Hill, Alex Honnold, Hayden Kennedy, Adam Ondra, Mayan Smith-Gobat and many others.
