= Mark Richey =

American climber and business owner

Mark Richey (born 1958) is an American rock climber and alpinist with a history of significant first ascents around the world, and for which he won the Piolets d'Or, the highest award in mountaineering, in 2012 and in 2020. Richey was also made president of the American Alpine Club from 2003 to 2006. He is also the founder and president of Mark Richey Woodworking, a company based in Newburyport, Massachusetts.

== Climbing career ==
Richey began climbing at age 15 in the Boston area and has completed more than forty expeditions to the Greater Ranges. In the early 1980s, he made the first ascents of the south face of Ocshapalca, and the east face of Cayesh in Peru. Other first ascents have been done in Greenland and India.

Two of Richey's climbs in the Karakoram won Piolets d'Or, the best-known prize for alpine climbing. The first was for the first ascent of Saser Kangri II in 2011, with Steve Swenson and Freddie Wilkinson. The second was for the first ascent of the southeast face of Link Sar (2,300-metres, M6+, WI4, 90 degrees) in 2019, with Swenson, Chris Wright, and Graham Zimmerman.

== Business career ==
Richey began his woodworking career as an apprentice to a master harpsichord builder named William Dowd. He started building fine cabinetry in 1979. In the early 1980s, he launched Mark Richey Woodworking, specializing in high-quality architectural woodworking. The company now employs about 100 and is based in a 130,000-square-foot plant in Newburyport, Massachusetts, that is largely powered by wind and solar energy and a biomass furnace.

== See also ==
- Alpine climbing
- Ice climbing
- Mixed climbing
