= Marko Prezelj =

Slovenian mountaineer and photographer (born 1965)

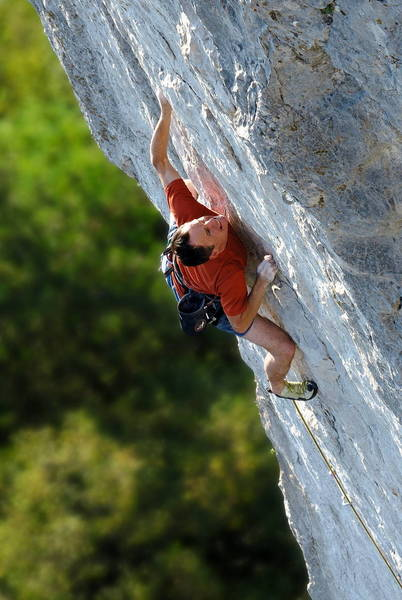
Marko Prezelj

Marko Prezelj (born 13 October 1965) is a Slovenian mountaineer and photographer.

Prezelj received four Piolet d'Or awards. He won the inaugural "Oscar of mountaineering" in 1992 with Andrej Štremfelj for their new route on the south ridge of Kangchenjunga South (8476) in alpine style. The second he received in 2007 with Boris Lorenčič, for the first ascent of Chomolhari's northwest pillar in October 2006. Prezelj rejected his second award because of his concern about the dangers of a competition. In 2014 he received his third Piolet d'Or together with Aleš Česen and Luka Lindič for their first ascent of the north face of Hagshu in the Indian Himalaya. In 2016 he won his fourth Piolet d'Or (with Manu Pellissier, Urban Novak and Hayden Kennedy, for Light Before Wisdom, in the East face of Cerro Kishtwar.

Prezelj has a degree in Chemical Engineering and is an IFMGA/UIAGM mountain guide and climbing instructor. He is married and has two sons.

== Ascents (selection) ==
- 1987 Lhotse Shar Expedition (reached 7300 m)
- 1988 New route on the north face of Cho Oyu
- 1989 Shisha Pangma south face attempt; solo ascent of the Kang Ri (6240 m)
- 1991 Kangchenjunga South (8476 m) south ridge new route, first ascent of Boktoh (6142 m), second ascent of Talung (7349 m)
- 1992 First ascent of Melungtse (7181 m)
- 1993 El Capitan, fifth ascent of Wyoming Sheep Ranch
- 1995 Torre Norte del Paine in Chile.
- 1998 New route on Porong Ri East Summit (7284 m) and Yebokangal Ri (7332 m)
- 1999 First ascent of the north wall of the Gyachung Kang (7952 m)
- 2000 Second ascent of the "Golden Pillar" of Spantik
- 2001 Begguya and Denali (6193 m) in Alaska - "Light Traveller" on the south face, new route, free climbed in a single push style, and Nilkanth west ridge (6596 m)
- 2002 Nuptse south face attempt
- 2004 North Twin North Face ascent with Steve House and Kapura Peak (6544m), new route and first ascent
- 2005 Kayish new route
- 2006 "The Long Run" on Cerro Torre and "Extreme Emotions" on Cerro Standhardt, free on sight ascent of "Cobra Oillar" on Mount Barille (Alaska) and Chomolhari (7326 m) northwest pillar
- 2007 First ascent of K7 West in Karakoram
- 2008 New route on W face of Kangchungtse (7678 m)
- 2009 Baghirathi IV, III and II new routes
- 2010 Bisotun Wall, Iran, new route
- 2011 Makalu W face attempt (reached 7000 m) and integral ridge traverse of Chago peaks
