= Silvia Vidal =

Spanish mountain climber (born 1970)

Sílvia Vidal
Personal information
- Nationality: Spanish
- Born: December 17, 1970 (age 55) Barcelona, Catalonia, Spain
- Occupation: Professional Mountaineer
- Height: 5 ft 3 in (160 cm)
- Website: www.vidalsilvia.com

Climbing career
- Type of climber: Big wall climbing; Aid climbing; Alpine climbing; Rope solo climbing
- Updated on April 30, 2019

Sílvia Vidal (born December 17, 1970) is a professional big wall climber, and aid climber, and alpine climber from Barcelona. She is particularly known for her big wall soloing accomplishments in remote mountain regions of Pakistan, India, Patagonia, and Alaska.

== Early life ==
Vidal was born in Barcelona. At 24, as a university student, Vidal was an athletics athlete and studying physical education when she got involved with competing in a multi-sport athletic event. One of the included sports was climbing and Vidal became interested, noting that "this was something different because before that I was doing athletics and running a lot and this became the first time I touched the rock." Vidal's initial climbing education consisted of trad climbing on multi-pitch big wall climbs, primarily because that was what her friends were doing. Within a year, she was climbing up to A5, but didn't try her first sport climbing pitch until her she had been trad climbing for over a year.

== Climbing career ==
After climbing for just two years, Vidal received the Piolet d'Or award from the Spanish Mountain Federation for her 1996 climb, Principado de Asturias (Grade A4) in Northern Spain.

By the mid-nineties, Vidal had gained experience in both European climbing hot spots, like Montserrat and in Yosemite Valley, California. In August, 1999, Vidal, with partners Pep Masip and Miguel Puigdomenech, made the first ascent of Sol Solet on Amin Brakk, a 5800m tower in the Nangma Valley of Karakoram, Pakistan. The tower was named after the expedition's Spanish cook, whose first name was Amin. In 2001, the American Alpine Journal singled out the team's climb as a notable example of a "particularly impressive endurance test." The climbers spent a continuous 32 days on the wall, with climbing difficulty up to A5. In the end, the climbers placed only 31 bolts, with 27 clumped on a completely blank wall section.

In September 2004, Vidal and partner Eloi Callado established a new, 890m route, Mai Blau (A3+) on Neverseen Tower in the Indian Himalaya.

In July 2007, Vidal made a solo expedition back to Karakoram, Pakistan, and put up a huge, 2900 ft solo route, Life is Lilac, on the Shipton Spire. Vidal spent 21 continuous days alone on the wall, with difficulty grades of A4+.

In February and March 2012, in another solo expedition, Vidal established Espiadimonis, a 1500m A4 route on Serrania Avalancha in Chilean Patagonia. Vidal spent 32 continuous days alone on the wall after bush-whacking through the jungle to reach the area and set up base camp. Wet conditions necessitated 16 completely inactive days lying in the portaledge. The rainy conditions created waterfall-like effects along the face of the wall, so Vidal was nearly always soaked and "felt like I was in a swimming pool".

In July 2017, Vidal established Un pas més (A4+) on the west face of Xanadu, a mountain in the Arrigetch Peaks of Alaska.

Vidal received a special mention during the November 2021 awarding of the Piolet d'Or for her contributions to solo big wall climbing.

== Climbing style and philosophy ==
Vidal is widely-known within the climbing community for soloing hard aid routes in remote and difficult-to-reach regions of the world. Vidal favors an independent, labor-intensive approach to expeditions, doing much of the research, preparation, and gear-hauling herself. Vidal says: "to plan a big wall expedition in remote places requires complex logistics. First, you have to inform yourself as much as possible about the place you are going, because most of the ascents I have done are in places with unclimbed walls, without any information. To prepare the logistics of the equipment and decide what you should take is a handicap."

On solo expeditions, Vidal avoids bringing any means of communication with the outside world, including radio, phone or any internet connection. In remote areas, Vidal sometimes explores without maps or GPS and has to navigate the approach "by intuition". Vidal is a proponent of an arduous, personal style of exploration that often includes hauling all of her own gear in extremely remote and challenging conditions. For example, in 2017, the climber spent 53 total days alone in the Alaskan Arrigetch range, 36 of which were spent hauling equipment and food, and 17 days of climbing. PlanetMountain wrote that "in many respects, the actual climbing was the least demanding part of the entire trip. A staggering 36 days, for instance, were spent hauling the 150 kilos of food and gear needed for the 53 days she spent alone in the remote Alaskan valley." Vidal notes that "normally numbers are what counts: what have you done, how many meters, what grade--That's relevant and important, too, but from my view it is equally important to see how things were done. To go in that style is a way of saying 'I am really alone.' If I go alone, I am alone." Although Vidal prefers this style, she does not believe that other climbing styles are less laudable, simply that this is the path she has chosen.

Vidal has been a proponent of treating male and female climbers equally in terms of evaluating their accomplishments, believing that men and women are both capable of feats of equal magnitude in mountaineering, climbing, and exploring. "If someone congratulates me as the first woman to open a new route on Shipton Spire by herself, that person is underrating my accomplishment," she wrote.

== Personal life ==
While Vidal has had multiple climbing sponsorships over the years, these have not always been consistent. She had to self-fund her 2007 expedition to the Karakoram because of problems with her sponsor, and in the past supplemented her income with jobs installing the electrical cables in windmills. Vidal's trips are extremely physically demanding, often requiring up to six months of post-trip recovery time. During periods between expeditions, she gives presentations and motivational talks about her accomplishments.

== See also ==
- Catherine Destivelle
- Josune Bereziartu
