= Tomo Česen =

Slovenian mountain climber

Tomislav "Tomo" Česen (born 5 November 1959) is a Slovenian mountaineer who specializes in solo climbing ascents in the Alps and the Himalayas.

In 1986, aged 26, he reported that he had enchained the three Great north faces of the Alps, becoming the first person to do so solo in winter; although nobody witnessed his feat. Česen enjoyed a period of fame and sponsorship from his enchainment, and went on to claim a number of increasingly bolder, and in some cases, groundbreaking, solo ascents, including: No Siesta on the Grandes Jorasses, Pilier Rouge du Brouillard Direttissima on Mont Blanc, Modern Times on the south face of the Marmolada, the north face of Jannu (or Kumbhakarna), and the enormous south face of Lhotse. Many of his boldest solo ascents are now treated with skepticism in the mountaineering community, and particularly his 1990 solo ascent of Lhotse’s south face. He remains a controversial figure in climbing.

One of the main climbing routes on K2 is named the Česen Route, after his solo ascent of the route to where it joins with the Abruzzi Spur; there is evidence that he made his claimed ascent on K2, and his earlier 19-hour solo ascent of Broad Peak (made in preparation for K2) is not disputed.

His son is the mountaineer, Aleš Česen.
