= Paul Ramsden (climber) =

British mountain climber

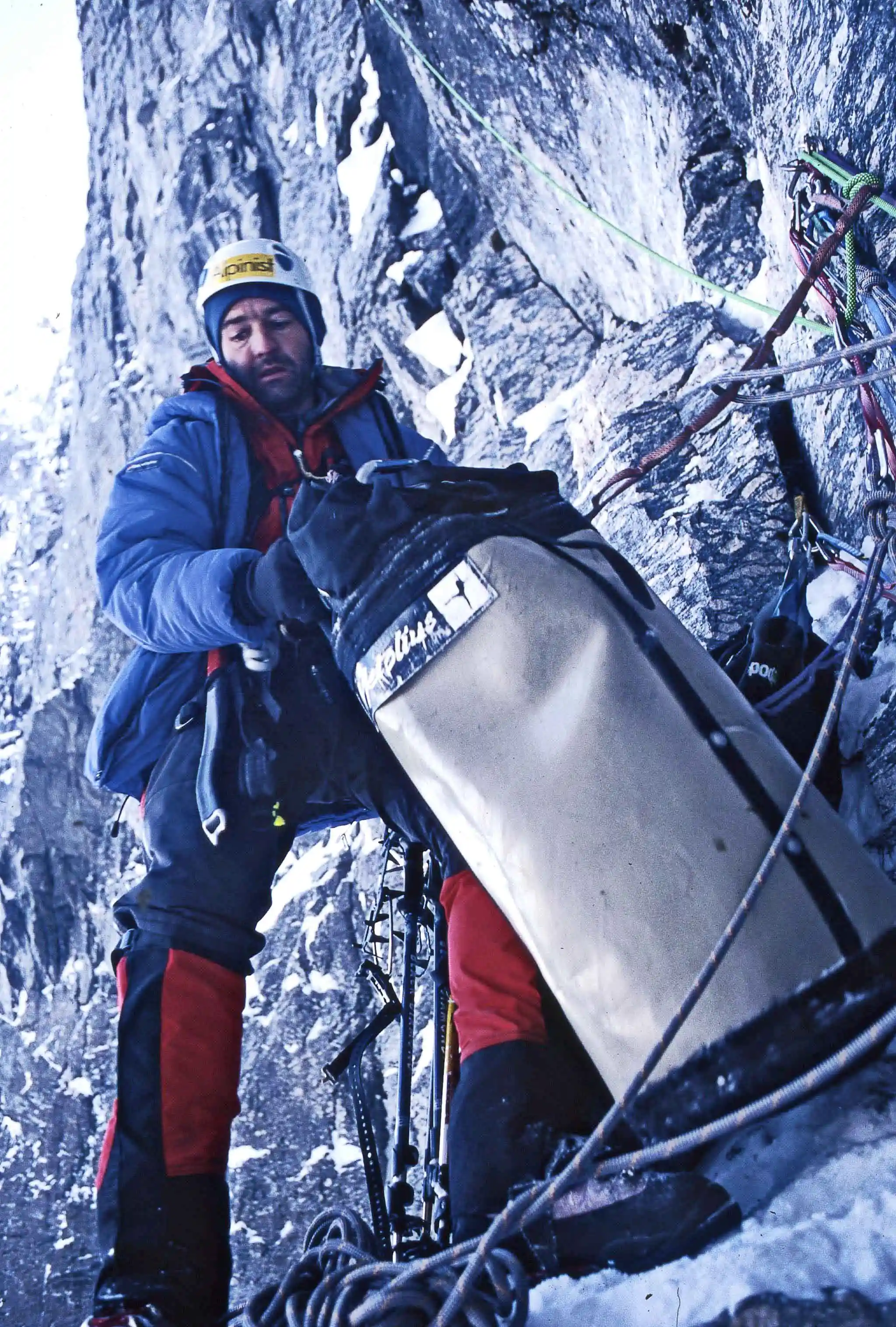
- Ramsden on the Troll Wall, 2004

Personal information
- Born: 1969 (age 56–57) Yorkshire, England
- Education: University of Sheffield (1987-90, BSc); University of Birmingham (2011-12, MSc)
- Occupation: Occupational hygienist
- Website: About Paul Ramsden

Climbing career
- Type of climber: Traditional climbing; Alpine climbing; Mixed climbing
- First ascents: NW Singuniang (ED+, 2002); Prow of Shiva (ED+, 2012); N Gave Ding (ED+, 2016); N Nyenchen SE (ED+, 2017); N Jugal Spire (ED, 2023)
- Known for: Five time winner of the Piolet d'Or
- Updated on 21 April 2024

Paul Ramsden (born 1969) is a British mountaineer and alpinist. He is internationally noted for his alpine climbing. Ramsden was awarded the Piolet d'Or five times for alpine-style first ascents of extreme high-altitude routes in the Himalayas: 2003, 2013 and 2016 with Mick Fowler (they were the first British winners of the award). 2017 with Nick Bullock, and in 2023 with Tim Miller. Ramsden is notably media and publicity-shy (no social media presence and minimal sponsors), and in 2023 was described by the Financial Times as "The most decorated mountaineer ever (and why you’ve never heard of him)".

== Climbing career ==
Ramsden is a strong advocate of lightweight 'alpine style' climbing and rejects the use of fixed ropes or other expedition climbing supports (e.g. oxygen or porters). In 2023, he said: ".. I am an alpinist and would never consider climbing in another way. If I couldn't climb alpine style, then I would stop climbing. It's the only ethical way to climb big mountains, and to be honest any other way is simply cheating." Ramsden feels the Piolet awards suit the British style of climbing, saying: "Small teams, exploration, alpine style... that's exactly what the Piolets d'Or aim to promote, and that's how we learn to climb".

Ramsden attributes his longevity in the notably dangerous world of high-altitude extreme alpine climbing to experiencing the deaths of climbing partners at a younger age—particularly one when he was 17.

== Notable ascents and awards ==
- 2002 Northwest face of Siguniang (ED+, VII AI6 M6, 1,500m, Sichuan). FA with Mick Fowler; they won the 2003 Piolet d'Or, and the 2002 Golden Piton Award for this climb.
- 2007 Northwest Ridge of Manamcho (TD, Scottish V, 700m, Tibet). FA with Mick Fowler; known as the Matterhorn of the Nyenchen Tanglha.
- 2010 North Face of Sulamar (TD+, 1,600m, Xinjiang, China). FA with Mick Fowler.
- 2012 Northeast Buttress ("Prow") of Shiva (ED+, 700m, India) with Mick Fowler; they won the 2013 Piolet d'Or for this climb, their second.
- 2013 Southwest Face of Kishtwar Kailash (ED, Scottish VI, 1,500m, India). FA with Fowler.
- 2014 Northeast Face Hagshu (ED, 1,300m, India). FA with Mick Fowler.
- 2015 North Face of Gave Ding (ED+, 1,600m, Nepal). FA with Mick Fowler; they won the 2016 Piolet d'Or for this climb, which was their third.
- 2016 North buttress of Nyainqentangla South East (1,600m, ED+) in Tibet. FA with Nick Bullock; they won the 2017 Piolet d'Or for this climb, which was Ramsden's fourth.
- 2022 North face (Phantom Line) of the Jugal Spire (1,300m, ED, 5-days) in the Jugal Himal, Nepal. FA with Tim Miller; they won the 2023 Piolet d'Or for this climb, which was Ramsden's fifth.
- 2023 North Face of Surma-Sarovar (6,574m), Salimor Khola Valley in the Gurans Himal with Tim Miller.

== Personal life ==
Like his long-term climbing partner Mick Fowler, Ramsden is not a professional climber and is self-employed as a full-time occupational hygienist through his service company, 'Integral HSE'.

== Bibliography ==
- Ramsden, Paul (2023). "The Jugal Project: The First Ascent of a Striking Spire in Nepal". American Alpine Journal. 65 (97). American Alpine Club.
- Ramsden, Paul (2017). "The Wrong Valley: Climbing a Hidden Wall on a 7,000-Meter Peak in Tibet". American Alpine Journal. 59 (91). American Alpine Club: 10–18.
- Ramsden, Paul (2016). "Positive Vibes: The first ascent of Gave Ding in western Nepal". American Alpine Journal. 58 (90). American Alpine Club: 56–65.
- Ramsden, Paul (2015). "Hagshu, Northeast Face and Traverse". American Alpine Journal. 57 (89). American Alpine Club: 320–325.
- Ramsden, Paul (2014). "Kishtwar Kailash, Southwest Face". American Alpine Journal. 56 (88). American Alpine Club: 337.

== See also ==
- Rick Allen (mountaineer), Scottish Piolet d'Or winner
