= Andrej Štremfelj =

Slovenian mountaineer (born 1956)

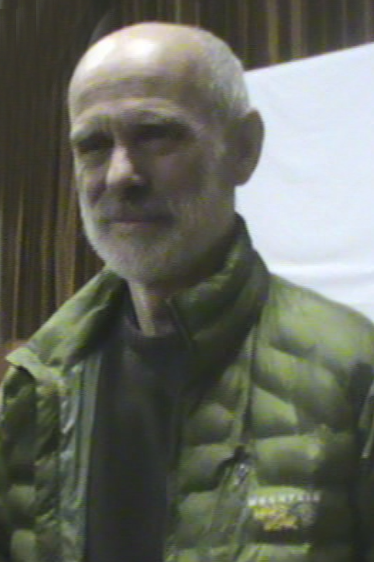

Personal information
- Full name: Andrej Štremfelj
- Nationality: Slovenian
- Born: 17 December 1956 (age 69) Kranj, Slovenia, Yugoslavia

Andrej Štremfelj (born 17 December 1956) is a Slovenian mountaineer, and in 2019, became the 10th recipient of the Piolet d'Or Lifetime Achievement Award.

== Life and work ==
Štremfelj was born in Kranj and got involved in mountaineering when he was 16. In 1982, he became a mountain guide. He entered the history of Slovenian mountaineering on 13 May 1979, when he and Nejc Zaplotnik became the first Slovenes and the first Yugoslavs to reach the summit of Mount Everest. Štremfelj also conquered several other eight-thousanders, and later climbed Mount Everest once more with his wife, becoming the first married couple to do so.

== Awards ==
- In 1992, he and Marko Prezelj were bestowed the Bloudek Award, and the Piolet d'Or award, for their alpine style ascent of the new route on the south ridge to the south summit of Kangchenjunga.
- In June 2018, Štremfelj became the first Slovenian mountaineer, and only the 10th mountaineer in history, to be awarded the Piolet d'Or Lifetime Achievement Award.
