= Kyashar =

Mountain in Nepal

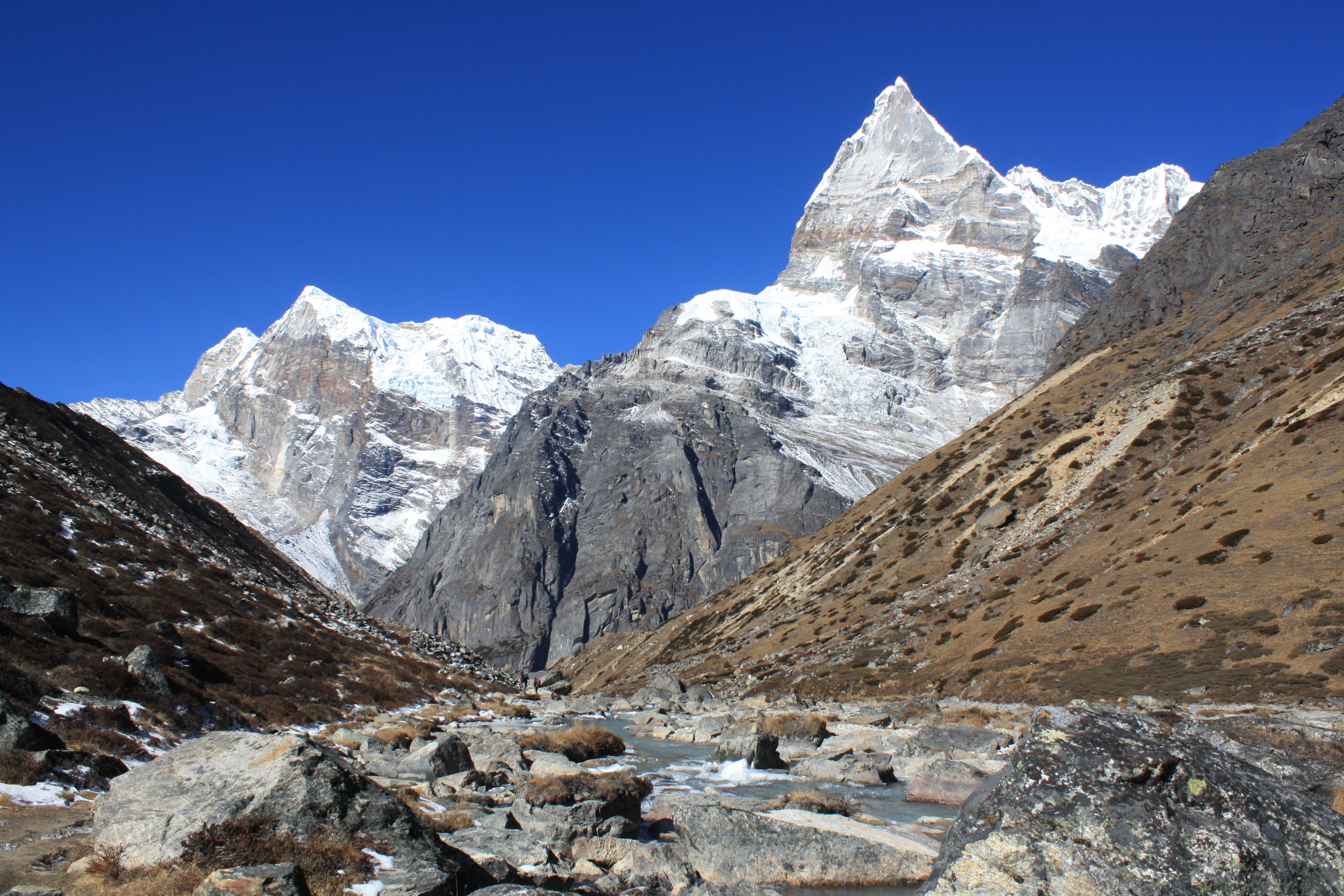
- Kusum Kangguru (left) and Kyashar (right)

Highest point
- Elevation: 6,769 m (22,208 ft)
- Coordinates: 27°45′18″N 86°49′22″E

Geography
- Location within Nepal
- Location: Solukhumbu (Nepal)
- Parent range: Mahalangur Himal (Himalaya)

Climbing
- First ascent: 18. October 2003 by Bruce Normand, Andreas Frank and Sam Broderick

The Kyashar (also known as Thangnaktse and Peak 43) is a mountain peak (6769 m height) in the Khumbu region in Nepal, east of Namche Bazar in the so-called Hinku Himal. It is located within the Makalu-Barun National Park.

North of Kyashar lies the Kangtega (6783 m), southwest the Kusum Kangguru (6367 m), and the Mera Peak (6476 m) is 6.77 km southeast.

The Kyashar is connected to the Kantega via a ridge. On the west flank flows the Kyashar glacier.

Until 1983, the mountain was named "Peak 43". In 2017, the Nepalese authorities carried out a naming of mountains and other geographic locations, to "wipe out" a large number of Western names from the map, changing the name to "Kyashar". The mountain also is sometimes called Thangnaktse, and at a local level it is sometimes called Charpate, which means "square", describing the shape of mountain peak.

== Ascents ==
The Kyashar was first climbed on 18 October 2003 by Bruce Normand, Andreas Frank, and Sam Broderick. The ascent route led over the west ridge and the west wall.

On November 11, 2012, the Japanese Yasuhiro Hanatani, Hiroyoshi Manome and Tatsuya Aoki made the first ascent of the mountain over the south pillar (South Pillar), the so-called NIMA route (2400m, ED +, 5.10a, M5), in alpine style, for which they were awarded the Piolet d'Or.
