= Shingu Charpa =

Shingu Charpa سینگو چرپا
- Location within Pakistan

Highest point
- Elevation: 5,980 m (19,620 ft)SRTM1 calculation
- Prominence: 581 m (1,906 ft)SRTM1 calculation
- Listing: Karakorum
- Coordinates: 35°21′14″N 76°26′30″E

Geography
- Location: Pakistan
- Parent range: Masherbrum, Karakoram

Climbing
- First ascent: 23 July 2000 three member Korean team

Shingu Charpa (Urdu: شینگو چرپا) is a mountain in the Hushe Region in Pakistan. It is a 5800-meter Karakorum empire located in Masherbrum massif in Nangma valley.

== Climbing history ==
=== Success ===
In July 2000 three-person Korean Team succeeded in ascending to the summit of Shingu Charpa.

=== Recent Attempts ===
July 2006
Igor Chaplynsky, Andrey Rodiontsev and Orest Verbitsky (Ukrainian), attempted North Ridge route
August 2006
Kelly Cordes and Josh Wharton (American), attempted North Ridge route
September 2007
Alexander Klenov, Mikhail Davy and Alexander Shabunin (Russian), summited via East Face to intersecting North Ridge and named this route "Never More"

== Routes ==
=== North Ridge ===
The North Ridge route follows Shingu Charpa's North pointing ridge that rises out of the Nangma Valley. It has been attempted at least twice but has not been successfully ascended to the summit of Shingu Charpa.

=== Never More ===
The route Never More ascends the east face of Shingu Charpa and intersects the North Ridge route near the summit.
