= Hayden Kennedy (climber) =

American rock climber (1990–2017)

Personal information
- Born: February 12, 1990 Carbondale, Colorado, U.S.
- Died: October 8, 2017 (aged 26–27) Bozeman, Montana, U.S.

Climbing career
- Type of climber: Alpine climbing; Traditional climbing; Big wall climbing
- First ascents: East Face of K7; South Face of Baintha Brakk, the Ogre (7,285m); East Face of Cerro Kishtwar, Light before Wisdom (1,200 m)
- Known for: Piolet d'Or (2013, 2016)

Hayden Kennedy (February 12, 1990 – October 8, 2017) was an American rock climber and mountaineer who made notable ascents in North America, Patagonia and in the Himalayas. He was the son of renowned writer and mountaineer Michael Kennedy and he won the Piolet d'Or for his ascent of The Ogre in 2013, and for Light Before Wisdom in 2016.

== Climbing career ==
In 2012, Kennedy came to prominence following a "fair means" ascent of the Compressor Route on Cerro Torre during which he and his partner Jason Kruk chopped the bolt ladders left by Cesare Maestri on the first ascent. Kennedy and Kruk's actions created a local controversy in El Chaltén and they were arrested shortly after returning. Following their release from jail, their actions generated an ethics debate about bolting practices in the mountains in the international climbing community. The environmental and ethical motivations of their actions during this climb were recognized by the Piolet d'Or council.

In 2013, Kennedy and his climbing partners Kyle Dempster and Josh Wharton won a Piolet d'Or for their alpine style first ascent of the south face of the Ogre.

On October 7, 2017, while skiing on Imp Peak in Montana's Southern Madison Range, Kennedy and his partner Inge Perkins were caught in an avalanche. Surviving the avalanche, Kennedy attempted to rescue the buried Perkins but her avalanche beacon was turned off and in her backpack at the time of the accident. Later the following day, Kennedy died by suicide, after leaving detailed instructions on where to find Perkins' body.

=== Writing ===
Kennedy was a regular contributor for Alpinist, and for Rock & Ice magazines.

== Notable ascents ==
- 2008 – onsight ascent of the Bachar-Yerian Route (5.11+, R/X), Tuolumne Meadows, Yosemite Valley, California
- 2008 – free ascent of El Nino (5.13b/c, A0), El Capitan, Yosemite Valley, California
- 2012 – first 'fair means' ascent of the Compressor Route, Cerro Torre, Patagonia with Jason Kruk
- 2012 – first free ascent of Carbondale Short Bus (5.14- R), the most difficult traditional rock climb in Indian Creek, Utah
- 2012 – first ascent of South Face of Baintha Brakk (the Ogre), Karakoram Range, Pakistan with Josh Wharton and Kyle Dempster
- 2012 – first ascent of East Face of K7, Karakoram Range, Pakistan with Kyle Dempster and Urban Novak
- 2014 – first ascent of Light Before Wisdom (ED+ 5.11 WI6 M6 A2, 1200m), Cerro Kishtwar, Kishtwar Himalaya, India
