= Aleš Česen =

Slovenian mountain climber

- Born: April 26, 1982 (age 43); Kranj, Slovenia
- Occupation(s): Mountaineer, mountain guide, entrepreneur
- Parent: Tomo Česen (father)
- Awards: Piolet d'Or (2015, 2019)
- Website: www.cesen.com

Aleš Česen (born 26 April 1982) is a Slovenian climber, mountaineer, mountain guide and entrepreneur.

== Climbing career ==
In 2015, Česen was awarded Piolet d'Or for the ascent of the north face of Hagshu along with Marko Prezelj and Luca Lindič. In 2019, he received the award again for the North ridge of Latok I in 2019 with his climbing partners, Tom Livingstone and Luka Stražar. In 2017, Česen was awarded Alpinist of the year award, by the Alpine Association of Slovenia.

== Personal life ==
Česen has a PhD in Civil Engineering, and is an IFMGA/UIAGM certified mountain guide and climbing instructor. Aleš has two sons.

His father is the Slovenian mountaineer, Tomo Česen.

== Notable ascents ==
- 2018. Karakoram – North ridge on Latok I (7145 m / 23 442 ft)
- 2017. Indian Himalaya (Kishtwar) – New route on North Ridge of P6013 (6038 m / 19 809 ft)
- 2017. Indian Himalaya (Kishtwar) – New route on Arjuna (6250 m / 20 505 ft), 2nd ascent of the summit, 1st in alpine style
- 2017. Many difficult ice climbs and mixed climbs in Alberta and British Columbia
- 2016. Nepal, Khumbu – SW ridge on Ama Dablam (6812 m / 22349 ft)
- 2016. Karakoram – Austrian route on Broad Peak (8051 m / 26 414 ft)
- 2016. Karakoram – NW ridge on Gasherbrum IV (7925 m / 26 001 ft)
- 2015. Alaska, Denali National Park – SW ridge on Mount Frances
- 2015. Alaska, Denali National Park – W couloir on Kahiltna Queen
- 2015. Alaska, Denali National Park – French route in N face on Mt Hunter
- 2014. Indian Himalaya (Zanskar) – New route on Lagan (5750 m / 18865 ft), TD-
- 2014. Indian Himalaya (Zanskar) – New route on Hana's Men North (6300 m / 20669 ft), TD
- 2014. Indian Himalaya (Zanskar) – New route on Hagshu north face (6657 m / 21840 ft), ED
- 2008. Charakusa Valley (Karakorum) – Second ascent of the Anderson-House-Prezelj route (ED, 6c, M6, 2200 m) on K7 West (6858 m / 22 500 ft)
- 2008. Charakusa Valley (Karakorum) – Normal ascent on the Sulu Peak (6050 m / 19 849 ft)
- 2008. Charakusa Valley (Karakorum) – British route on Nasser Brak (5200 m / 17 060 ft)
- 2006. Trango Towers (Karakorum) – Normal route on Great Trango Tower (6286 m / 20 623 ft)
- 2006. Trango Towers (Karakorum) – Chota Badla (Trango Monk, 5850 m / 19 192 ft), second ascent
- 2006. Trango Towers (Karakorum) – Free ascent on Slovenian route (VI 5.12a/b, M5m 1000m) on Nameless Trango Tower (6251 m / 20 509 ft)
- 2006. Trango Towers (Karakorum) – Many other shorter routes in the Trango range
- 2005. Kula Kangri range (Tibet) – Climbed a new route in west face of Karejiang III (6824 m / 22 388 ft)
- 2005. Kula Kangri range (Tibet) – An attempt on Kula Kangri (7538 m / 24 731 ft). Failed due to bad weather.
- 2004. Yosemite Valley: Astroman (Washington Column), The Nose (El Capitan), Salathe Wall (El Capitan), Regular NW face (Half Dome) and many more.
- 2003. Tian Shan - Climbed a new route in south face of Peak Gorky (6050 m / 19 849 ft)
- 2003. Tian Shan - Climbed the normal route in Khan Tengri (7010 m / 22 999 ft)
