= Hervé Barmasse =

Italian mountaineer

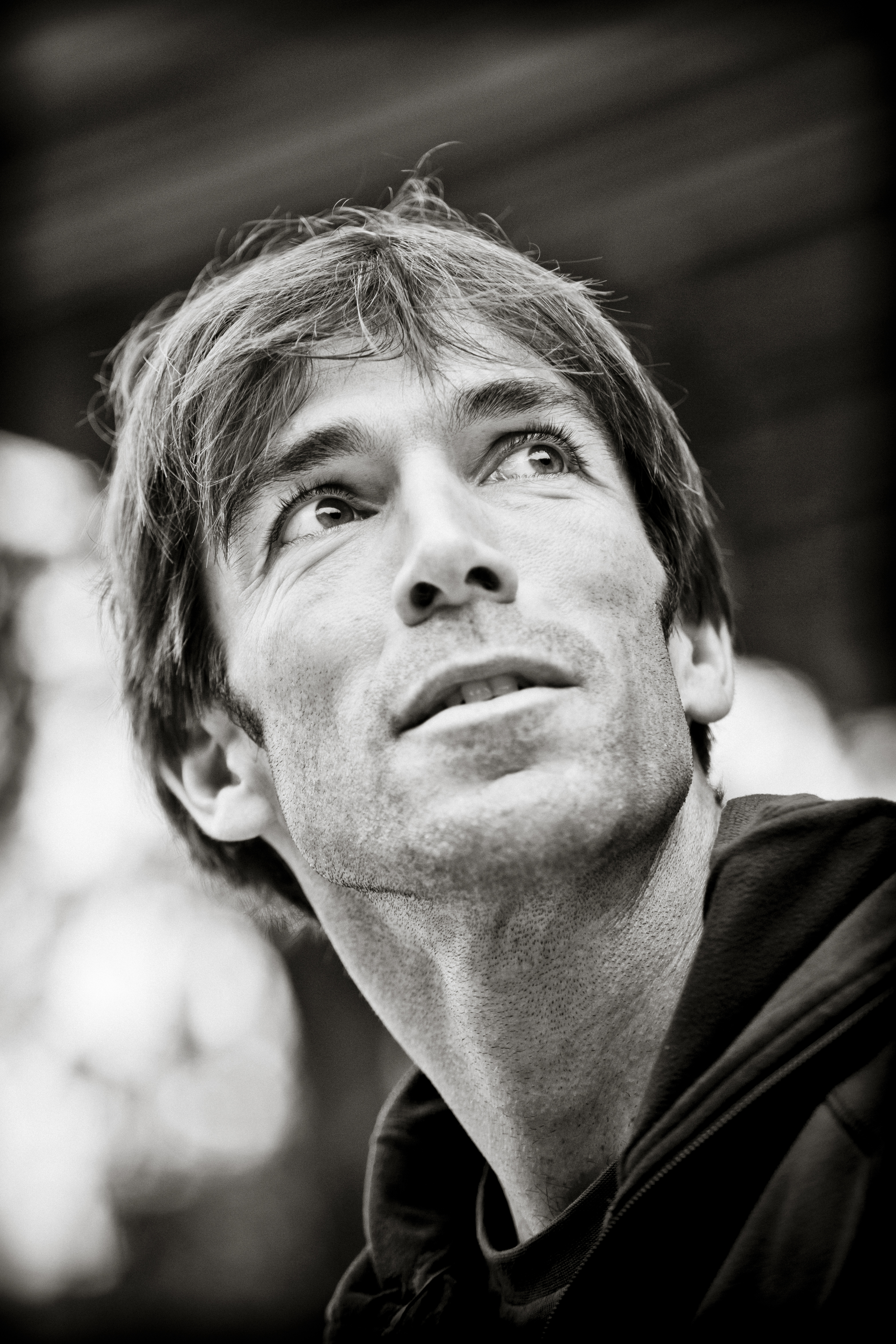

Personal information
- Born: 21 December 1977 (age 48) Aosta, Italy

Hervé Barmasse (French pronunciation: [ɛʁve baʁmas]; born 21 December 1977) is an Italian alpinist. He began his career as a mountaineer on his home mountain, the Matterhorn, climbing new routes and repeating various prestigious ones.

== Early life ==
Barmasse was born into a family of alpinists from Valtournenche, where he grew up. His father Marco and grand father Michel were also alpinists. He became a ski instructor in 1996, snowboard instructor in 1997 and has been a Matterhorn alpine guide since 2000 and national alpine guide instructor since 2007.

== Career ==
He began his career as a mountaineer on his home mountain, the Matterhorn, climbing new routes and repeating various prestigious ones. After growing up in the shadow of this mountain, it was right here where Hervé completed various extreme solo ascents. The most noteworthy of these ascents include the first solo ascent of the Casarotto Grassi route in 2002 (ED, 1300m), the first solo ascent in 2005 of the Deffeyes route (ED, 1300m) completed in under four hours, and in 2007 the first solo ascent of the Spigolo dei fiori on the Machetto route: all routes on the south face of the Matterhorn. A further noteworthy ascent was the first solo ascent and first repetition of the Direttissima route which was first climbed in 1983 by his father Marco.

The pursuit and exploration of unclimbed faces led him away from the Alps and in 2004 he climbed two new routes in Pakistan: Luna Caprese on the Chogolisa Shield and another route on Sheep Peak (6300m).

His experience in Pakistan continued in 2005 and in addition to the solo ascent of an unclimbed peak on the Farol Peak ridge, he also climbed two new routes with companions from the Trip One Karakorum expedition: Up and Down (6c/7a and A1, 800m) and Fast and Furious, a mixed ice and rock route, this too on an unclimbed peak.

In spring 2006 in Patagonia, during his first trip to South America, he completed another remarkable achievement when he climbed a new ice and mixed route called Café Cortado (1200m) on the north face of Cerro San Lorenzo.

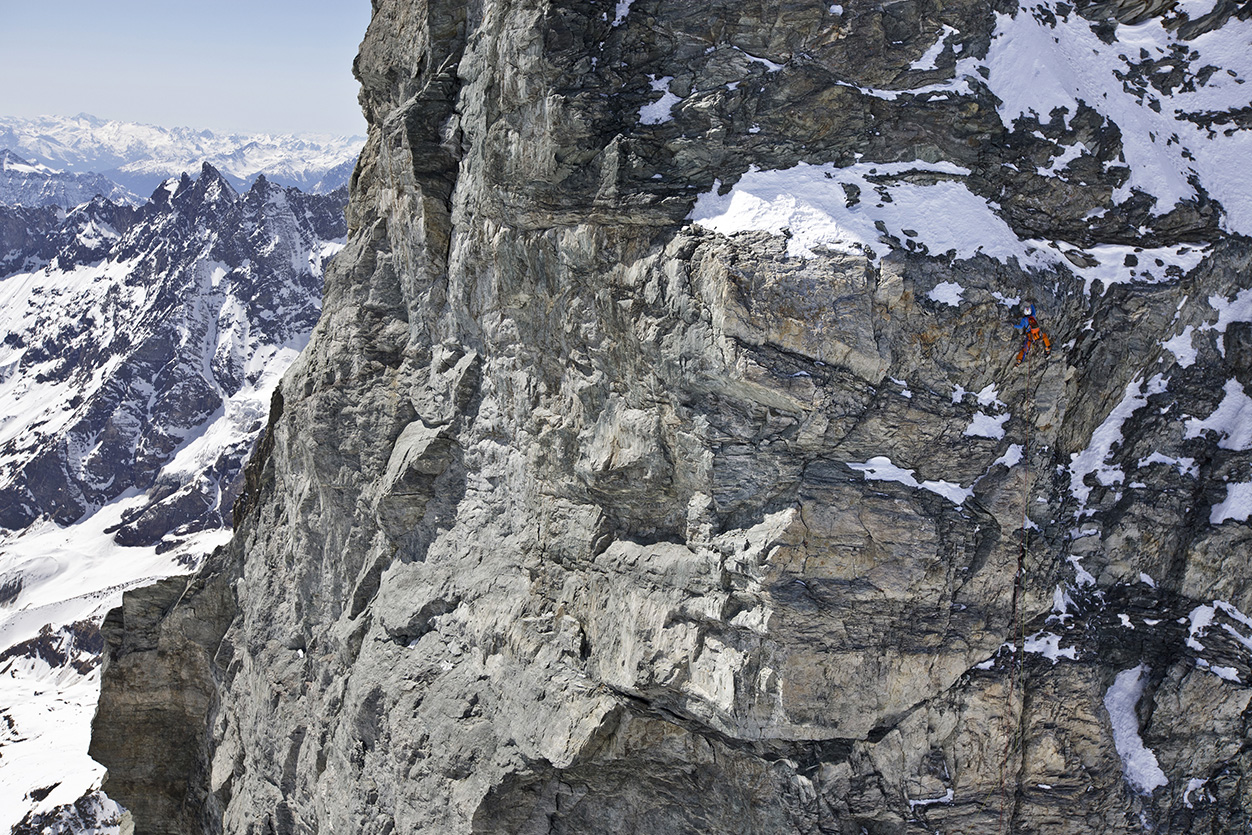

On 8 February 2008, together with Cristian Brenna, Hervé cracked the enigma of the northwest face of Cerro Piergiorgio (Patagonia) which for years had been the object of numerous attempts by top mountaineers. "La Ruta de lo Hermano", a route on poor quality rock, runs right through the middle of the heart of this immense face for 1150 metres: 29 pitches graded as 6b+ A3 ED+.

In the summer of 2008, together with his climbing partner Simone Moro, Hervé climbed Beka Brakai Chhok in alpine style, a 6940m mountain in the Karakoram region (Pakistan), attempted numerous times by various expeditions.

In autumn 2008, he climbed a 6250m unclimbed peak on Muztagh-ata (China) in alpine style.

In early 2010 he returned to Pakistan together with Eneko Pou, Kris Erickson, Oscar Gogoza and Dr. Marco Cavana; after the ascent of some ice falls he organised the first course for high altitude porters also open to women at the Shimshal Climbing School, with the goal of training and teaching safe techniques for progression on rock and ice. Furthermore, thanks to the help of Dr. Marco Cavana, an intensivist from Aosta hospital, he organised the setting up of a dispensary to deal with health-care problems in the area.

On 17 March 2010 he climbed a new route with his father Marco on the south face of the Matterhorn – the Couloir Barmasse (1200m, hard mixed route, ABO). In the summer of 2010 he completed an alpine style ascent in two days together with Daniele Bernasconi and Mario Panzeri of the 6300m unclimbed Venere Peak, graded ED (China). For the fourth time he received the coveted Paolo Consiglio Award for mountaineering.

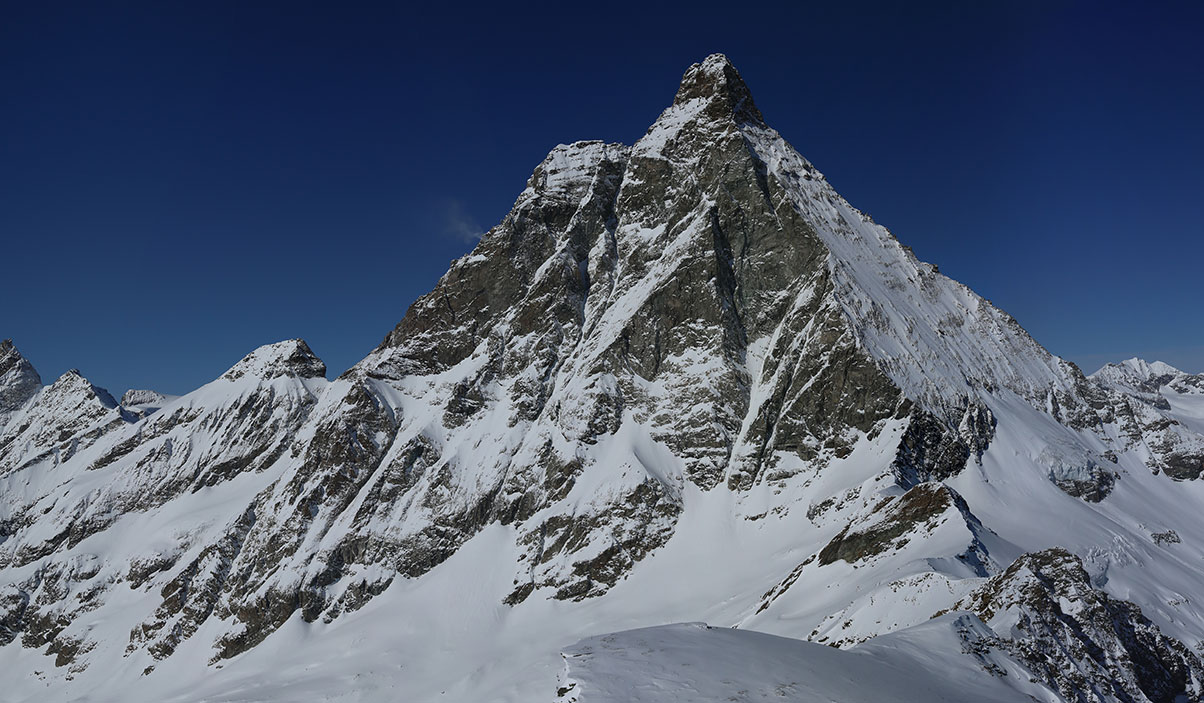

In 2011 the "Exploring the Alps" project was carried out, a trilogy with the aim of climbing three new routes on the most important mountains in the valley which are also some of the highest in the Alps: Mont Blanc, Monte Rosa and the Matterhorn. These three new routes enabled Hervé to rediscover alpinism in the Alps and show that exploration is still possible in these places.

Out of the three ascents, the Matterhorn was without doubt the most challenging. Hervé tackled it solo, astounding the mountaineering world with his audacity and the immense risk he undertook during the three-day ascent. The route first climbed by Barmasse extends over 1200 metres, 500m of which are in a frozen couloir with the rest of the route on the vertical and overhanging face of Picco Muzio. This achievement evokes the feat accomplished in 1965 by the great alpinist Walter Bonatti – the only person to have solo climbed a new route on the Matterhorn before Barmasse. On completing this achievement, Bonatti bid farewell to his career as an extreme alpinist.

In 2012 Barmasse made a film about the Exploring the Alps project, called Not so far. The film participated at the most important international mountain film festivals, winning major awards.

After an attempt on the unclimbed north face of Gasherbrum I (8068m) and a long break due to a problem with his spine, Hervé returned to Patagonia in 2013, but this time in winter. There he completed the first winter ascent of Cerro Pollone and the first ever ascent in winter of two of the Colmillos peaks. On 13 March 2014 he was back on the Matterhorn where he completed the first winter enchainment of the four ridges (which, moreover, he completed solo), starting by climbing the Furggen Ridge (thereby also completing the first solo winter ascent of the Via degli strapiombi) and then descending the Hornli Ridge before climbing the Zmutt Ridge and descending via the Lion Ridge, all in 17 hours.

== List of first ascents ==
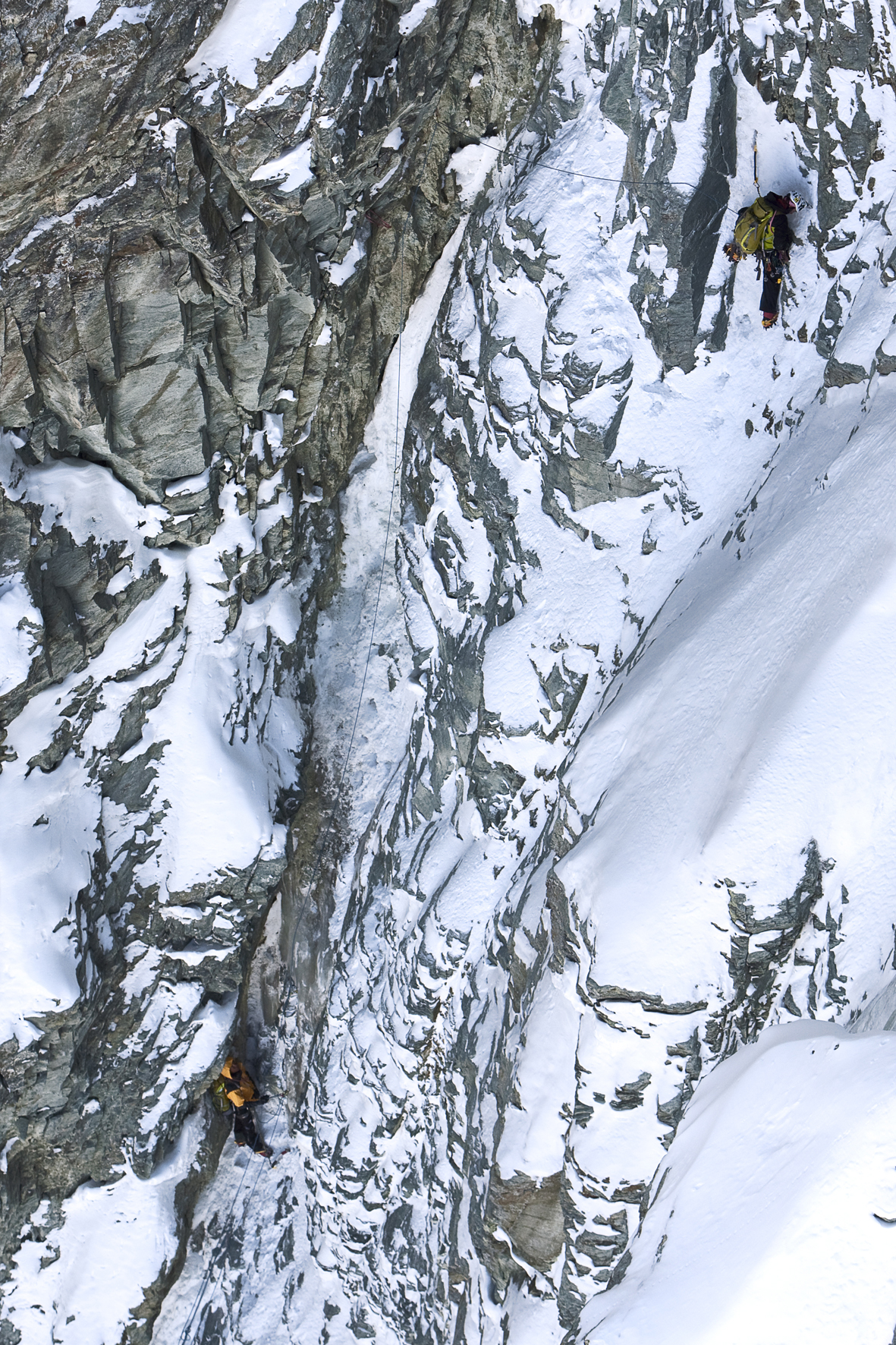
- December 2014: Grandes Murailles: New route Bon Noel
- March 2014: Matterhorn – First winter enchainment of the four ridges. He completed the enchainment alone.
- August 2013: Patagonia – Winter season – First winter ascent of Cerro Pollone and first ascent of Colmillos central and north.
- July 2012: Pakistan, Sing Gang Glacier/Snow Lake area. 3 First ascent of three unclimbed peaks. First ascent and traverse of Muky peak 6330 m, first ascent and descent of the 5966m mountain to the left of the Sing Gang Glacier and first ascent of an easy, hidden peak in the Solu Towers group.
- April 2011: Matterhorn South Face – Hervé Barmasse solo climbed a new route up the great pillar on the southeast face of the Matterhorn. Prior to Barmasse, no one had climbed directly up this overhanging wall.
- September/October 2011: Monte Rosa South-East Face – New route climbed with his father Marco: A journey through memories (ED, 800m)
- August 2011: Mont Blanc – New Route with Iker and Eneko Pou: "The Modern Classic"
- March 2010: Matterhorn South Face – New route climbed with his father Marco: The Couloir Barmasse.
- January 2010 – February 2010: Pakistan Shimshal Valley. First ascent of several ice falls. Creation and execution of courses on safety and progression for Shimshal porters (men and women) at the Shimshal Climbing School (set up as a collaboration with Qudrat, Simone Moro and Hervé Barmasse, with sponsorship by The North Face, Kong and Camp).
- January 2009: Patagonia – Hielo Continental Sur – new traverse route from east to west on the third largest glacier on Earth.
- September 2008: China – Miky Sel 6250m. – First alpine style ascent
- July 2008: Pakistan – Beka Brakai Chhok, 6940m. – First alpine style ascent
- February 2008: Patagonia – Cerro Piergiorgio – First ascent of the west face: "La Ruta de lo Hermano"
- September 2007: Matterhorn – First solo ascent of the "Spigolo dei Fiori" route
- April 2007: Matterhorn – First solo ascent of the south face of the Matterhorn on the "Direttissima" route.
- February – March 2006: Patagonia – Cerro San Lorenzo (3706m) – New route on the north face: "Café Cortado" (ED, 1200m); Patagonia – Cerro Poincenot (3201m); Patagonia – Aguja Guillaumet (2571m)
- October 2005: Matterhorn – First solo ascent of the Deffeyes route in under four hours
- June – July 2005: Pakistan – Chogolisa Shield – New route: "Up and Down" (grade 6c/7a and A1, 800m); Pakistan – New mixed ice route on an unclimbed peak (5800m): "Fast and Furious" (700m): Pakistan – First complete solo ascent of an unclimbed peak (approx. 6000m) on the Farol Peak ridge; Pakistan – Naysar Brakk (approx. 5200m) via the "English Route"
- January 2005: Dent d'Herin – West face – First ascent of the "Ammazza Geko" route (grade IV+/5, 800m)
- June 2004: Pakistan – Sheep Peak (6300m) – new route; Pakistan – Chogolisa Shield (approx. 5700m) – New alpine-style "Luna Caprese" route (grade 6c max, 1000m)
- March 2004: Matterhorn – South Face – First winter repetition of the "Padre Pio Prega per Noi" route (grade 6c/7a max, 1000m)
- July 2003: Pizzo Badile – South Face – New route: "Ringhio" (grade 6c obl., 370m)

== Awards ==
- City of Parma Sport and Civility Award 2015
- Adventure Award 2014
- Luigi Leoni Award 2011
- Paolo Consiglio Award 2010
- Monzino Award 2010
- SAT Award – Mountaineering category 2010
- Paolo Consiglio Award 2008
- Saint Vincent Grolla d'Or Award 2007
- Paolo Consiglio Award 2006
- Paolo Consiglio Award 2005

== Filmography ==
- Not so far (2012) – director, producer, protagonist.
- Linea continua (2010) – producer, protagonist and director together with Giacomo Berthet and Damiano Levati.
- Antonia (2015) – Actor in the role of Emilio Comici – directed by Ferdinando Cito Filomarino, produced by Luca Guadagnino
- Cervino, la montagna del mondo (2015) – Author, director of photography and co-producer – directed by Nicolò Bongiorno.
- Il Cervino. La montagna perfetta (2015) – Collaboration in the making of the documentary for Rai by Marco Melega and Matteo Di Calisto
- Matterhorn – Vom Mythos zur Marke (2015) – Participation in the making of the documentary produced by the Austrian TV station Servus TV

== Television ==
- Alle falde del Kilimangiaro, Rai 3, 2016/2017 edition – Collaborator and regular guest on the programme presented by Camila Raznovich
- Qui montagne, Rai Regione Valle d'Aosta – Presenter – 2004/2005 edition

== Books ==
- La montagna dentro, Editori Laterza, May 2015.
