= Enchainment =

Mountaineering term to link up routes

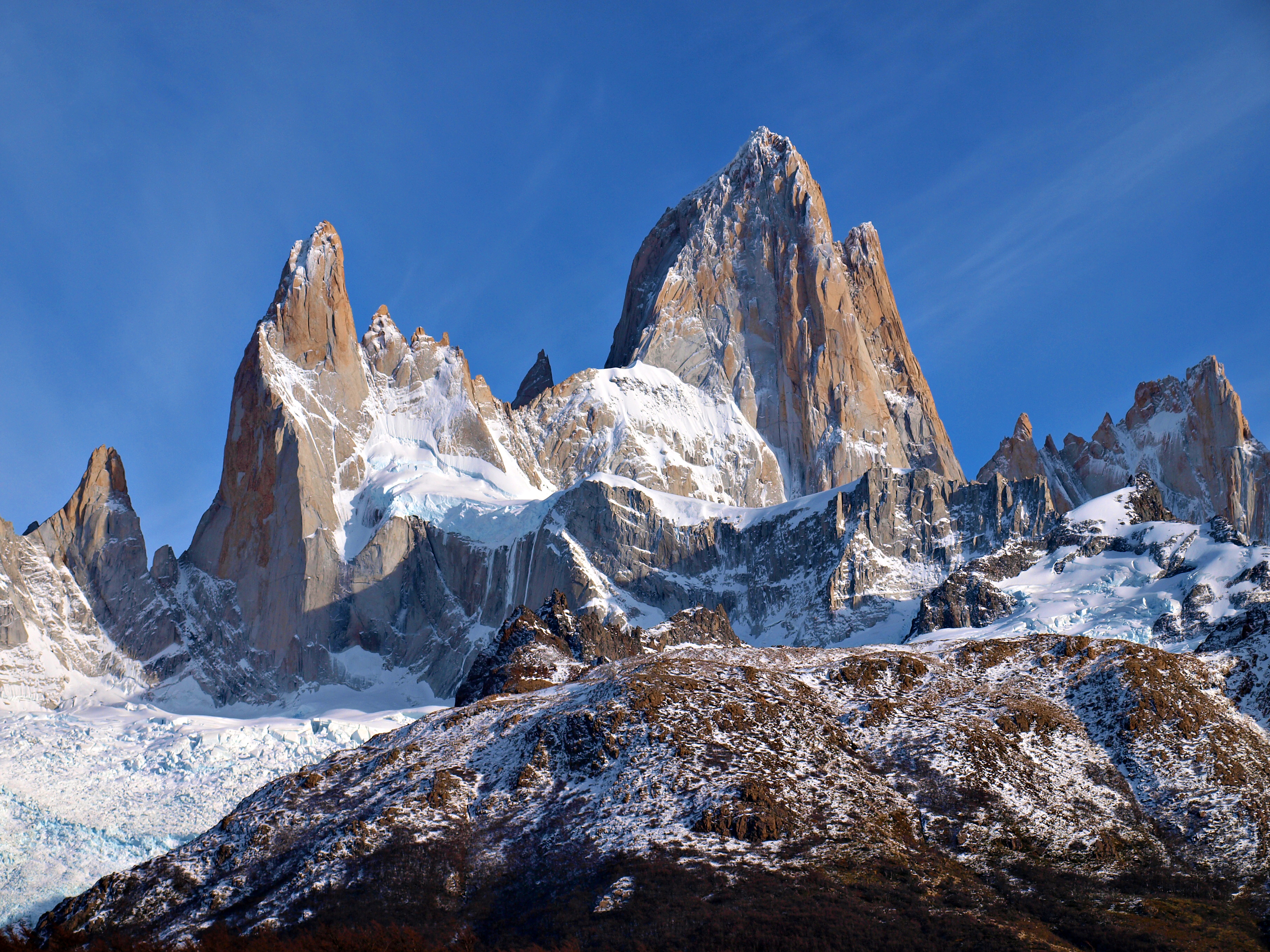
Alex Honnold and Tommy Caldwell won the Piolet d'Or in 2015 for their enchainment of the entire Fitzroy Massif in a 5-day push

In mountaineering and climbing, enchainment (an anglicisation of the French word enchaînement, meaning "linking") is climbing two or more mountains or climbing routes on a mountain in one outing (often over the course of a day or a series of days). Rock climbing two or more routes in this manner are also called a "link up" in the United States. Climbers may do an enchainment of easy routes as a way of training for a more difficult objective, but some enchainments of hard routes are a prize in their own right, a notable example being the great north faces of the Alps.

== In alpinism ==
By the 1970s, the number of possible new routes in the Alps seemed to be drying up, and so alpinists looked for other challenges. Developments in hang glider and paraglider technology, as well as advances in extreme skiing and the use of helicopters, meant that mountains could be descended much more quickly than they could by foot, making possible enchainments of long and difficult face routes. Early practitioners of this style of climbing were predominantly French, the most notable being Jean-Marc Boivin, Christophe Profit, and Jean-Christophe Lafaille.

- In August 1975 Nicolas Jaeger (who had made the first solo traverse of the Chamonix Aiguilles in 1973) accomplished the first solo ascent of the Bonatti-Gobbi route on the Grand Pilier d'Angle, descended to the Upper Freney Glacier and then made the second solo ascent of the Central Pillar of Freney, thereby reaching the summit of Mont Blanc over 17 hours. That achievement has led to him being referred to as "the inventor of modern enchainments".
- On 17 March 1986, Boivin, using skis, a paraglider, and a hang glider for his descents, linked up ascents of the north faces of the Aiguille Verte, Les Droites, Les Courtes, and the Grandes Jorasses, flying 15 km (9.3 mi) back to the Chamonix valley after his final ascent and arriving at 0:30 am.
- From 11 to 12 March 1987, Profit was the first to climb the three hardest of the six great Alpine north faces, "the Trilogy", (the Eiger, the Matterhorn and the Grandes Jorasses) in under 24 hours.
- In April 1996, Lafaille made a 15-day solo enchainment of ten classic alpine faces, including routes on the Eiger, and the Matterhorn.

== In rock climbing ==
- In 1986, John Bachar and Peter Croft made the first link-up of routes on El Capitan and Half Dome in Yosemite in a single day.
- In 2014, over a 5-day period, Alex Honnold and Tommy Caldwell completed the first-ever full enchainment, The Fitz Roy Traverse (5.11d C1 65 degrees, 5000m), on the Fitz Roy massif, in Patagonia.

== In mountaineering ==
- In May 2008, Japanese climbers Katsutaka Yokoyama, Yusuke Sato, and Fumitaka Ichimura, completed the enchainment on Denali of the Isis Face (M4 5.8 A1, 60 degrees, 7,200-feet [to South Buttress], Stutzman-Tackle, 1982), and the Slovak Direct (5.9, 100 degrees, 9,000-feet, Adam-Korl-Krizo, 1984), in a single, eight-day push.
