= Steve Swenson =

American mountaineer

Steve Swenson (born February 14, 1954) is an American rock climber, mountaineer, and author. Swenson served as the president of the board of directors for the American Alpine Club from 2009 to 2012.

== Climbing career ==
Swenson is known for his big-mountain climbing expeditions to the Karakoram range, about which he wrote the book Karakoram: Climbing Through the Kashmir Conflict, published by Mountaineers Books. Swenson has taken part in over 15 expeditions to the area.

In 2011, Swenson along with Mark Richey and Freddie Wilkinson, made the first ascent of Sasser Kangri II. At the time, the peak was the second highest unclimbed mountain in the world. For their climbing, the team was awarded the Piolet d’Or.

In 2019, Swenson, along with Graham Zimmerman, Mark Richey, and Chris Wright, climbed Link Sar, for its first ascent. The team was awarded the Piolet d'Or in 2020, for their achievement. Swenson had attempted to climb it twice before, in 2000 and 2017. Steve is one of only a few people to receive more than one Piolet d'Or, considered mountaineering's highest honor.

== Personal life ==
Along with his climbing career, Swenson had a 35-year career as a water resources consulting engineer.

== Notable ascents ==
- K2, without oxygen (1990).
- Mount Everest, without oxygen (1994).
- Nanga Parbat, ascent of the Mazeno Ridge to Mazeno Gap, 2004
- K7 West, North Ridge, 2004
- Saser Kangri II (2011), a climb for which he was awarded the Piolet d’Or.
- Link Sar, first ascent, with Graham Zimmerman, Mark Richey, and Chris Wright in 2019.

== Writings ==
- Karakoram: Climbing Through the Kashmir Conflict, published by Mountaineers Books in 2017.
