= Chris Jones (mountaineer) =

British–American rock climber and mountaineer (1939–2024)

Personal information
- Nationality: British-American
- Born: November 24, 1939 United Kingdom
- Died: September 17, 2024 (aged 84)

Climbing career
- Type of climber: Traditional climbing; Big wall climbing; Alpine climbing

Chris Jones (November 24, 1939 – September 17, 2024) was a British–American rock climber, photographer, climbing historian, author, and alpinist. He is known for establishing difficult and influential alpine style climbing routes from 1965 to 1980 in the Andes and the Canadian Rockies. He was the author of Climbing in North America, one of the earliest books on the history of climbing in North America from the 1800s to the 1970s. He was a co-author and contributed photos to the book, Climbing Fitz Roy, 1968 Reflections on the Lost Photos of the Third Ascent which documented a 1968 expedition to Patagonia by Jones, Chouinard, Tompkins, and Dorworth. The photos included in the book were thought to have been lost in a 1996 wildfire that destroyed Jones's California home but copies were later found by Dorworth.

== Climbing career ==
Jones was climbing in America during the Golden Age of big wall climbing, including living at Camp 4 in Yosemite during the summer of 1967. In 1968, Jones was part of the third ascent of Fitz Roy with Yvon Chouinard, Doug Tompkins, Dick Dorworth and Lito Tejada-Flores, described in Climbing Fitz Roy, 1968: Reflections on the Lost Photos of the Third Ascent. This ascent was also documented in the climbing film, Mountain of Storms, by Lito Tejada-Flores.

His 1974 ascent of the North Face of North Twin Peak in the Canadian Rockies, with George Lowe, was the first ascent of a difficult and highly technical alpine climbing route. Their climb was one of four ascents defined as "career highlights" by the Piolets d'Or when awarding Lowe a Lifetime Achievement Award in 2023; where they described the route as "a sheer black wall of north-facing limestone, steeper than the Eiger, one-and-a-half times the height of El Capitan, and the hardest in the Rockies" and the climb considered much harder than anything that had been done in the European Alps at the time.

In 1977, he was one of six American mountaineers selected by an American Alpine Club committee to fulfill an invitation from the Mountaineering Federation of the Soviet Union as part of the Soviet–American Mountaineering Exchange Program along with George Lowe, Mike Warburton, Henry Barber, Craig Martinson, and Alex Bertulis. During this exchange, they did a new ice route up the North Face of Mirali by Lowe, Jones, Onishenko (Soviet), and Obchenekov (Soviet) in the Fanksy Gory range of Tajikistan, and explored mountains in the Tien-Shan having been told that they were the first Westerners to gain permission to climb in that range along the Soviet-Chinese border. In the Tien-Shan, Jones, Mokauskas (Lithuanian), Pablechenko (Soviet), and Bertulis climbed the central route up the North Face of Free Korea Peak.

== Personal life and death ==
Jones was born in the United Kingdom on November 24, 1939. He immigrated to the United States in 1965, at the age of 25. Jones died on September 17, 2024, at the age of 84.

== Notable climbs ==
- 1965 Bonatti Pillar – first American ascent with George Lowe.
- 1967 Serenity Crack, Yosemite, USA (5.10d) – first free ascent with Tom Higgins
- 1967 North Face, Mount Assiniboine, Canadian Rockies – first ascent with Yvon Chouinard and Joe Faint
- 1967 North Face, East Summit, Mount Edith Cavell, Canadian Rockies – first ascent with Yvon Chouinard and Joe Faint
- 1968 Northeast Face of Yerupaja, Cordillera Huayhuash, Peru – first ascent July 27–31, 1968 with Paul Dix, Roger Hart, and Dean Caldwell
- 1968 Southwest Ridge aka California Route, Cerro Fitzroy, Patagonia – first ascent of route with Doug Tompkins, Lito Tejada-Flores, Yvon Chouinard and Dick Dorworth, 3rd ascent of peak.
- 1970 North Face, Mount Columbia (Canada), Canadian Rockies – first ascent with Gray Thompson
- 1970 Charlotte Dome, South Face III 5.7, FA: Chris Jones, Galen Rowell, and Fred Beckey. One of the Fifty Classic Climbs of North America
- 1971 North Face, Mount Kitchener, Canadian Rockies – first ascent with Jeff Lowe and Graham Thompson.
- 1973 Deltaform Ice Couloir, Deltaform Mountain, Canadian Rockies – ascent with George Lowe
- 1973 South Face, Devils Thumb (2767m), Coast Mountains, Alaska – first ascent with George Lowe and Lito Tejada-Flores.
- 1974 North Face (VI 5.10 A4), North Twin Peak (3631m) – first ascent, Canadian Rockies, regarded as a notable alpine climb of the era.
- 1980 Turret Mountain, The Ramparts, Canadian Rockies with Brock Wagstaff – first ascent of new route

== Books ==
- Jones, Chris (1976). Climbing in North America. California: University of California.
- Chouinard, Yvon; Dorworth, Dick; Jones, Chris; Tejada-Flores, Lito (2013). Climbing Fitz Roy, 1968: Reflections on the Lost Photos of the Third Ascent. Ventura, California: Patagonia.
