= Jim Donini =

American mountain climber (born 1943)

- Born: James Donini; July 23, 1943 (age 82); Philadelphia, PA, US
- Occupation: Alpine Climber
- Spouse: Angela Goodacre
- Children: Sage Hunter Donini, Montana Donini
- Parent(s): Ugo and Elizabeth A. Donini

James "Jim" Donini (born July 23, 1943) is an American rock climber and alpinist, noted for a long history of cutting-edge climbs in Alaska and Patagonia. He was president of the American Alpine Club from 2006 to 2009, and a 1999 recipient of the AAC's Robert and Miriam Underhill Award.

Donini first began climbing in the 1960s while serving with the United States Army Special Forces.

In 1978 Donini along with George Lowe spent 26 days climbing Latok's unclimbed North Ridge, which Donini has described as the "most awe inspiring and beautiful mountain cathedral on the planet".

== Notable climbs ==
- 1976 Torre Egger - First Ascent - with John Bragg, and Jay Wilson from the United States, by climbing first to the col between the Egger and Cerro Torre, the Col of Conquest, and then up the ridge to the peak. The ascent was hampered by bad weather and took from December 1975 to February 22, 1976 when the 3-person team summitted.
- 1978 North Ridge on Latok I, Karakorum Range, Pakistan. Attempt with Michael Kennedy, George Lowe and Jeff Lowe (climber) (all USA).
- 1991 Cobra Pillar on the east face of Mount Barrille, Ruth Gorge, Alaska Range, Alaska, USA (VI 5.10+ A3 WI5? 2300m) FA with Jack Tackle (USA), June 5–10, 1991.
- 1991 Viper Ridge, south spur of southeast ridge to ridge, Mount Foraker, Alaska Range, Alaska USA. FA with Jack Tackle (USA), June 11–17, 1991.
- 2000 Lightning Spur, south face Thunder Mountain, Alaska Range, Alaska USA. FA with John Bragg (USA).

== See also ==
Survival is not Assured: The Life of Climber Jim Donini by Geoff Powter, 2024. Mountaineers Books. ISBN 978-1-68051-537-4
