= Carlos Buhler =

American mountaineer (born 1954)

Carlos Buhler (born October 17, 1954, in Harrison, New York) is one of America's leading high altitude mountaineers. Buhler's specialty is high-standard mountaineering characterized by small teams, no oxygen, minimal gear and equipment, and relatively low amounts of funding; yielding first ascents of difficult routes in challenging conditions, such as the Himalayan winter season.

== Early life, education, and personal life ==
Buhler graduated from The Putney School in Putney, Vermont. As a junior in high school, he attended a School Year Abroad (SYA) program in Barcelona, where his exposure to the Spanish climbing community sparked his lifelong mountaineering career. In 2024, he received a distinguished alumni award from SVA for his outdoor expeditions as well as his work that draws on his mountaineering experience to enhance cross-cultural communication in corporate settings.

In 1978, Buhler graduated from Western Washington University's College of the Environment. He later received the university's distinguished alumni award.

Buhler lives in Canmore, Alberta, Canada. He has two children.

== Notable ascents ==
- 1977 North Face, Mount Temple (Alberta), Canadian Rockies, Canada. First winter ascent of face with Phil Hein (Canada). January, 1977.
- 1977 Super Couloir (North Face), Deltaform Mountain, Canadian Rockies, Canada. First winter ascent of face with Mark Whalen (Canada). February, 1977.
- 1977 West Face, Extremo (Huayna) Ausangate, Cordillera Vilcanota, Peru. First ascent of face with Lorenzo Ortas (Spain). June, 1977.
- 1980 East Ridge, Baruntse, Barun Valley, Himalaya, Nepal. New route and 2nd ascent with Lorenzo Ortas, Javier Escartin, and Jeronimo Lopez (all Spain). April 27, 1980. Gonzalo Prado and Lhakpa Dorje Sherpa reached summit next day.
- 1981 South Face to East Ridge Traverse, Obispo, East Ridge to West Ridge Traverse, Fraile Grande, El Altar, Sangay National Park, Ecuador, with (Obispo) David Jones (America). November, 1981 and (Fraile Grande) Michael Orr (Great Britain). December 1981.
- 1983 Kangshung Face, Mount Everest, Himalaya, Nepal/Tibet. First ascent of face and route with Kim Momb and Louis Reichardt (both America). October 8, 1983. George Lowe, Dan Reid and Jay Cassell (all America) reached summit next day.
- 1984 French Route, South Face, Aconcagua, Principal Cordillera, Andes, with Sharon Wood (Canada), December 17-22, 1984.
- 1985 Southern Cross, Anqosh (North) Face, Huascarán Sur, Cordillera Blanca, Peru. First ascent of route with Sharon Wood (Canada), July 24-29, 1985.
- 1985 Northeast Face, Ama Dablam, Himalaya, Nepal. First ascent of face and route with Michael Kennedy (America), Dec 1-7, 1985.
- 1987 | East Face, Pumasillo, Southeast Face, Mellizos, Vilcabamba mountain range, Andes, Peru. First ascent of both faces with Paul Harris (Great Britain). August 23-29, 1987.
- 1988 Northwest Face/North Ridge, Kangchenjunga, Himalaya, Nepal. First American ascent with Peter Habeler (Austria) and Martin Zabaleta (Spain/Basque). May 3, 1988.
- 1989 West (Polish) Ridge, Cho Oyu, Himalaya, Tibet/Nepal. First alpine style ascent with Martin Zabaleta (Spain/Basque). April 8, 1989.
- 1990 Northeast Ridge, Dhaulagiri, Himalaya, Nepal. Summit reached with Nuru Sherpa (Nepal) and Dainius Makauskas (Lithuania), October 31, 1990. Makauskas disappeared on the descent. Buhler and Nuru Sherpa suffered severe frostbite.
- 1992 West Ridge, Dorje Lhakpa or Dorje Lakpa, Jugal Himal, Himalaya, Nepal. First solo ascent. April 12–13, 1992.
- 1996 West Ridge, Mount Miller, Saint Elias Mountains, Alaska USA. First ascent with Charles Sassara, Paul Claus (both America), Ruedi Homberger, Reto Ruesh (both Switzerland), April 12, 1996.
- 1996 North Ridge, K2, Karakoram, China/Pakistan. Russian American ascent. Summit reached with Sergei Penzov and Igor Benkin (both Russia), August 14, 1996. Benkin died on the descent.
- 1997 East Buttress, University Peak, Wrangell Mountains, Alaska USA. New route with Charles Sassara (America), April 29-May 5, 1997.
- 1997 Diamir Face, Nanga Parbat, Himalaya, Pakistan. First Russian and second American Ascent. Summit reached with Ivan Dusharin (Russia), July 14, 1997. Viktor Kolishnichenko and Andrei Volkov (both Russia) reached the summit on July 18, 1997.
- 1998 The Lightning Route (VII 5.9 A4 WI4, 1580m), North Face of Changabang, Garhwal Himalaya, India. New route with Andrei Volkov, Andrei Mariev, Ivan Dusharin and Pavel Shabalin (all Russia). April 16 - June 6, 1998.
- 1998 North Face, Peak Babuchka ca. (5220 meters), West Face, Peak Carnovsky ca. 4700 meters, Kakshaal Too (West Kokshal Tau), Central Tian-Shan, Kyrgyzstan, New routes with (Babuchka) Mark Price and Christian Beckwith (both America), July 7-8 and (Carnovsky) Mark Price, July 26-27, 1998.
- 1999 West Face, Siula Grande, (6344 meters), Cordillera Huayhuash, Andes, Peru. New route Avoiding the Touch with Mark Price (America), June 16, 1999.
- 1999 East Face Milarepa, 6262 meters, Rolwaling Himal, Himalaya, Nepal. First ascent with Mark Price (America), October 11-13, 1999.
- 2000 Northwest Face, Kampur (5499 meters), Ishkoman Valley, Hindu Raj, Gilgit-Baltistan, Pakistan, First Ascent with Ivan Dusharin (Russia), August 4-5, 2000.
- 2002 West Thong Wok Glacier, Sepu Kangri, Nyenchen Tanglha Mountains, Eastern Tibet, First ascent with Mark Newcomb (America). October 2, 2002.
- 2003 East Face, Gunnar Naslund (3858 meters), Saint Elias Mountains, Wrangell-St. Elias National Park, Alaska, New route with Glenn Dunmire (America). April 26-27, 2003.
- 2003 West Face, Pucajirca North I, Cordillera Blanca, Andes, Peru, New route with Thaddeus Josephson (America). July 21–28, 2003.
- 2006 Northeast Face, Quesillo (5600 meters), Cordillera Huayhuash, Andes, Peru, New route with Brad Johnson (America), July 13-15, 2006.
- 2008 East Face, Cerro Castillo, Aysén Region Andes, Chilean Patagonia. New route with Joan Sole Rovirosa (Spain). October 6–9, 2008.

== Notable events ==
- Fulfilled dying wish of Russian composer, Alexander Scriabin, to have his last composition, Mysterium, performed in the Himalaya (at Menlungtse/Milarepa Base Camp, Tibet).
- Selected by the American Alpine Club at age 23 to join the high-profile 1978 Soviet-American team to climb in the Pamir Range of Tajikistan in Central Asia.

== Honors ==
- 1988 Mugs Stump Award, first year awarded. (Award honors “climbers attempting alpine climbing objectives that exemplify fast, light and clean tactics.”)
- 1988 American Mountain Foundation Award, for 1st American ascent of Kangchenjunga, world’s 3rd highest mountain.
- 1994 Mugs Stump Award for the West Face of K2.
- 1999 Mugs Stump Award for Menlungtse/Milarepa.
- 2001 Polartec Challenge Award, for “vision, commitment, credibility and respect for the local culture and environment [which] serve as role models to outdoor enthusiasts worldwide.”
- 2002 Ranked “Best of the Best”, and only American among the top four international high altitude climbers, by Everestnews.com. (2002 was the last year ranking was compiled.)
- 2003 Western Washington University, Distinguished Alumni Award.
- 2004 Lyman Spitzer Cutting Edge Grant (awarded for cutting edge “bold first ascents or difficult repeats of most challenging routes”)
- 2007 Robert and Miriam Underhill Award, for outstanding mountaineering achievement, by the American Alpine Club
- Keynote speaker and juror at leading mountain and wilderness film festivals:
  - 2002 Mountainfilm in Telluride Festival, Telluride, Colorado
  - 2003 Wild and Scenic Film Festival, Nevada City, California
  - 2004 Banff Mountain Film Festival, Banff, Canada
  - 2006 Juror, Trento Mountain Film Festival, Trento, Italy
  - 2008 Juror, Inkafest Mountain Film Festival, Huaraz, Peru

== Writings ==
- Buhler, Carlos (1989). "Kangchenjunga's North Face". American Alpine Journal. 31 (63). Golden, CO, USA: American Alpine Club: 23–30. ISBN 0-930410-39-4.
- Buhler, Carlos (1998). "University Peak, The wild card of the Wrangell-St. Elias". American Alpine Journal. 40 (72). Golden, CO, USA: American Alpine Club: 78–87. ISBN 0-930410-78-5.
- Buhler, Carlos (1999). "Russian Style on Changabang". American Alpine Journal. 41 (73). Golden, CO, USA: American Alpine Club: 106–113. ISBN 0-930410-84-X.
