= Balin Miller =

American mountain climber (2002–2025)

- Born: Balin Scott Miller; January 12, 2002; Anchorage, Alaska, U.S.
- Died: October 1, 2025 (aged 23); Yosemite National Park, California, U.S.
- Known for: First solo ascent of the Slovak Direct route on Denali

Balin Scott Miller (/ˈbeɪlɪn/ BAY-lin; January 12, 2002 – October 1, 2025) was an American climber known for solo ascents in Patagonia, Canada, and Alaska. He was the first person to solo climb the Slovak Direct route on Denali in Alaska, among other achievements. He died in an accident while descending El Capitan in Yosemite National Park, California.

== Early life ==
Balin Scott Miller was born on January 12, 2002, in Anchorage, Alaska, to David Miller and Jeanine Girard-Moorman. He grew up in Anchorage, and at the age of three, began rock climbing with his father and brother, Dylan, along the Seward Highway south of Anchorage. By the age of 12, he was seriously involved in climbing. Later, he began ice climbing, both along the Seward Highway and near the small coastal city of Valdez, Alaska.

== Career ==
Miller's primary activity was climbing, but he also worked seasonally as a crab fisherman in Nome, Alaska, and at a mine in Southeast Alaska. His parents helped support him. Miller said he climbed for "freedom", not fame. He lived out of his car, worked odd jobs, and scraped together what his family called his "shoestring salary" just to keep "chasing the next wall".

In 2023, he was awarded a Mountaineering Fellowship Fund Grant from the American Alpine Club that helped defray costs for climbing Mount Andromeda in Alberta, Canada.

During his climbing career, Miller was a team ambassador for Millet and Black Diamond equipment. Miller was a self-proclaimed Mark Twight fan and believed that "anything Mark Twight does is awesome". Known for applying face glitter before a difficult climb, Miller was quoted saying "…it's like a warrior putting makeup on before going into battle".

=== Climbing achievements ===
Miller achieved recognition for his solo ascents in Patagonia, Canada, and Alaska. He completed the second ascent of the challenging Grade VII Reality Bath ice climb in the Canadian Rockies, alone, in January 2025. In May and June 2025 he made the first solo choker ascent of the North Buttress of Mount Hunter via the "French Connection". He was the first person to solo the Slovak Direct route on Denali, which took him 56 hours to complete.

Veteran Anchorage climber Clint Helander said Miller was "the new king of the Alaska Range". Mark Westman, another experienced Alaskan alpinist, compared him to famed rock climber Alex Honnold.

== Notable ascents ==
Month and year	Route	Mountain	Location	Style	Time	Height	Difficulty	Notes
December 2021	Keystone Greensteps	Keystone Canyon	Valdez, Alaska	Solo, Ice	56m	650 ft (197 m), 4 pitches	WI5	
January 2022	Bridalveil Falls		Telluride, Colorado	Free solo, Trad, Ice		400 ft (121 m), 3 pitches	WI5+	
May 2022	Harvard Route	Mount Huntington	Alaska Range	Lead Trad		4,000 ft (1,212 m), 30 pitches, Grade VI	WI3 M6 C1 Steep Snow	w. Ethan Berkeland and Franklyn Dunbar "Remembering Balin Miller"
May 2022	Moonflower Buttress	Mount Hunter	Alaska Range	Lead Trad		6,000 ft (1,818 m), Grade VI	WI6 M7 Steep Snow	w. Ethan Berkeland
December 2022	Whiteman Falls	Canadian Rockies	Alberta, Canada	Free solo, Ice		300 ft (91 m), 2 pitches	WI5-6	
November 2023	Kitty Hawk	David Thmpson Highway	Icefields Parkway, Canadian Rockies	Solo, Ice	25m	500 ft (152 m), 4 pitches, Grade III	WI5	
November 2023	Nemesis	Stanley Headwall	Radium Highway, Canadian Rockies	Free solo, Ice	1h	525 ft (159 m), 4 pitches, Grade V	WI6	
November 2023	Slipstream	Mount Snowdome	Icefields Parkway, Canadian Rockies	Solo, Ice	4h	3,000 ft (909 m)	WI4+	
December 2023	Unknown White Powder	Weeping Wall aka PFM	Seward Highway, Alaska	Lead Trad		100 ft (30 m)	WI6+ M6	
February 2024	Come and Get It	Hyalite Canyon	Montana	Free solo	Under 10 m	135 ft (41 mi), Grade II	5.11 WI6 M7	"5th free solo ascent, no helmet, just glitter and a headband"
March 2024	Sandstone Samurai	Black Velvet Canyon	Red Rocks, Nevada	Lead Trad		700 ft (212 mi), 5 pitches	5.11a	
November 2024	South Seas	El Capitan	Yosemite, California	Solo, Trad	6d	2500 ft (758 m), 23 pitches, Grade VI	T5.9 A3+	
December 2024	Exocet	Aguja Stanhardt, Cerro Torre	Patagonia			500 m	WI5+ M5	
December 2024	Ragni	Cerro Torre	Patagonia			600 m	AI5+ M4	w. Ethan Berkeland and Chris Labosky
December 2024	Californiana	Cerro Chaltén/Fitz Roy	Patagonia	Solo, Mixed		400 m	5.10c	
January 2025	Virtual Reality	Mount Murchison	Icefields Parkway, Canadian Rockies	Solo, Trad, Ice		530 ft (161 m), 4 pitches, Grace IV	WI6	
January 2025	Reality Bath		Canadian Rockies	Solo	3h	600 m, 8 pitches	WI5+/6-, Grade VII Ice	Second-known ascent, 37 years after the first ascent in 1988. Downgraded from WI7 to WI5+/6-.
May 2025	Moonflower Buttress	Mount Hunter	Denali, Alaska			6,000 (1,818 m), Grade VI	WI6 M7 A2 Steep Snow	
May 2025	Bacon and Eggs on Mini-Mini-Moonflower	Mount Hunter	Denali, Alaska	Solo, Trad, Ice		1,500 ft (455 m), 9 pitches, Grade IV	W14	
May 2025	Deprivation	Mount Hunter	Denali, Alaska	Mixed, Ice		6,400 ft (1,939 m)	AI6 M6	w. Vincent Landry
May 2025	French Connection	North Buttress of Begguya, Mount Hunter	Denali, Alaska	Free solo	17h 30 m	6,500 ft	AI6, M6	
June 2025	Slovak Direct	Denali	Denali, Alaska	Free solo	56h	9,000 ft (2,700 m)	M6 WI6 A2	
September 2025	Sea of Dreams	El Capitan	Yosemite, California	Solo, Trad	4d	2,400 ft (727 m), 26 pitches, Grade VI	T5.9 A4	Final ascent

== Death ==
Starting September 28, 2025, TikToker mountainscalling.me was livestreaming all of the climbers on El Capitan in Yosemite National Park including "orange tent guy" (who was later identified as Miller) climbing Sea of Dreams, a difficult 730-meter (2,400 ft) aid climbing route. On October 1, 2025, Miller successfully completed the final pitch when his haul bag got stuck on the rock face below. When he descended back down his lead line to free his bag, Miller rappelled off the end of his rope. He fell 2,400 ft (730 m) from just below the top of the mountain, and died at age 23.

It was not clear what led to his fall, but his brother Dylan said that he was "lead-rope-soloing", which enables a climber to climb alone while still having the protection of a rope. He had already finished his climb, and was trying to haul up equipment when "he likely rappelled off the end of his rope". Such accidents are often caused by failure to tie a stopper knot at the end of the rope.
