= Mount Foraker =

Mountain in Alaska, United States

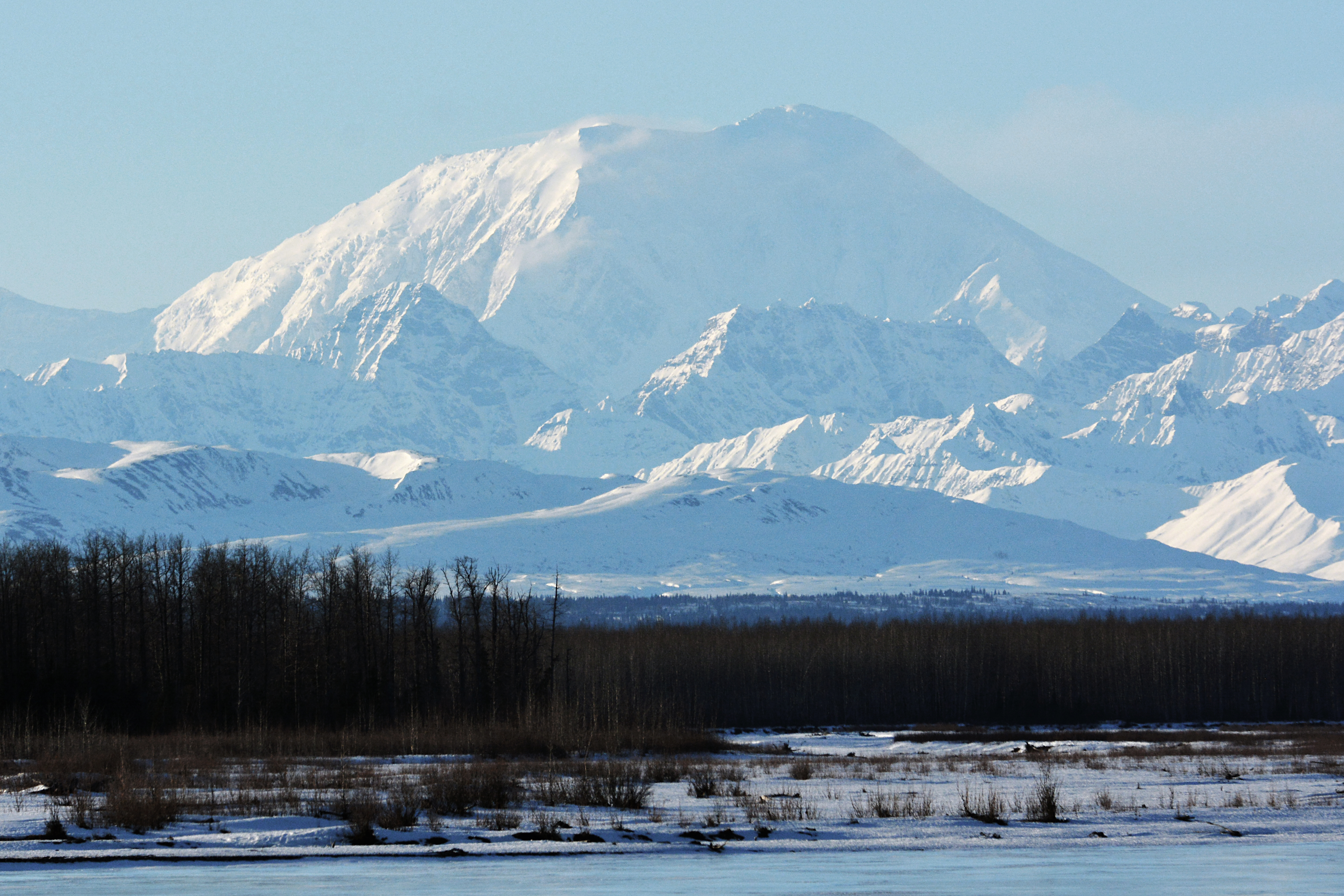
- Mount Foraker

Highest point
- Elevation: 17,400 ft (5,300 m); NAVD88
- Prominence: 7250 ft (2210 m)
- Parent peak: Denali
- Isolation: 14.27 mi (23.0 km)
- Listing: North America highest peaks 6th; North America prominent peaks 64th; US highest major peaks 3rd; Alaska highest major peaks 3rd
- Coordinates: 62°57′39″N 151°23′53″W

Naming
- Etymology: Joseph B. Foraker

Geography
- Location within Alaska
- Location: Denali Borough, Alaska, United States
- Parent range: Alaska Range
- Topo map: USGS Talkeetna D-3

Climbing
- First ascent: August 10, 1934
- Easiest route: basic snow/ice

Mount Foraker is a 17,400-foot (5,304 m) mountain in the central Alaska Range, in Denali National Park, 14 mi (23 km) southwest of Denali. It is the second highest peak in the Alaska Range, and the third highest peak in the United States. It rises almost directly above the standard base camp for Denali, on a fork of the Kahiltna Glacier also near Mount Hunter in the Alaska Range.

Its north peak was first climbed on August 6, 1934, and its higher south peak was climbed four days later on August 10, by Charles Houston, T. Graham Brown, and Chychele Waterston, via the west ridge.

== Name ==
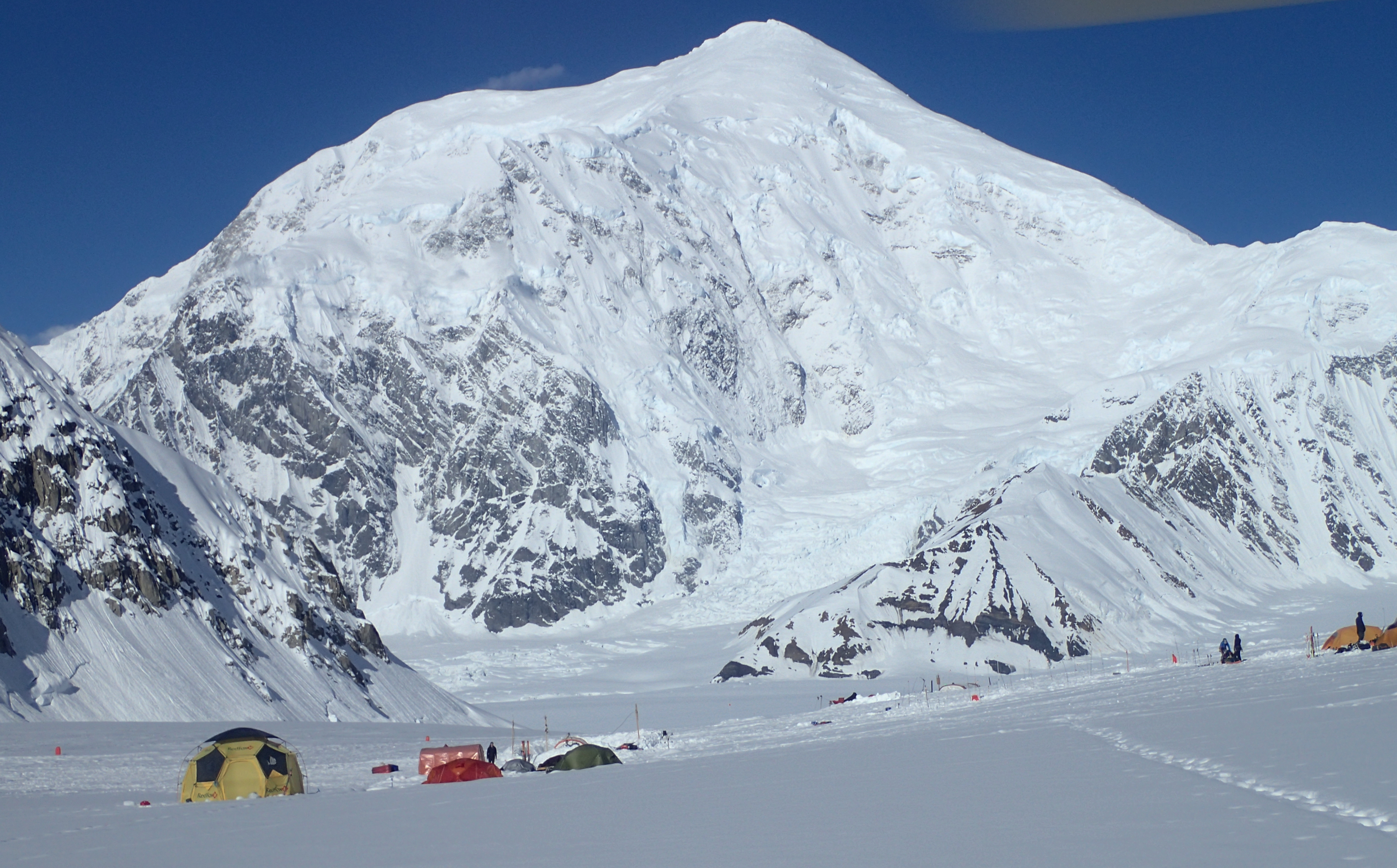
Mount Foraker base camp

Sunrise over Mount Foraker (17,400 feet)

Mount Foraker was named in 1899 by Lt. J. S. Herron after Joseph B. Foraker, then a sitting U.S. Senator from Ohio.

The Koyukon native peoples in the Lake Minchumina area had a broadside view of the mountains and thus gave distinctive names to both Foraker and Denali. According to Hudson Stuck, the Koyukon had two names for Mount Foraker: Sultana meaning "the woman" and Menlale meaning "Denali's wife". The Denaʼina of the Susitna River valley called the mountain Be'u meaning his wife (Denali) and the Lower Tanana Athabascans to the north are reported to have had the same name (Denali) for Mount Foraker as they had for Denali (federally designated as Mount McKinley), and it appears that the names were not applied to individual peaks but instead to the Denali massif. The mountain, along with Denali, was called Bolshaya Gora ("big mountain") in Russian.

== Notable ascents ==
- 1934 West Ridge FA of Mount Foraker by Charles Houston, T. Graham Brown and Chychele Waterston.
- 1963 Southeast Ridge. 2nd ascent. July 7. By Jim Richardson and Jeff Duenwald. Expedition led by Adams Carter.
- 1968 Talkeetna Ridge, South Ridge FA by Alex Bertulis, Warren Bleser, Hans Baer and Peter Williamson (US). The summit was reached on July 26, 1968. 4th ascent of peak.
- 1974 Southwest Toe of Southeast Ridge, variation to the South Ridge, ascent by Peter Reagan, Joe Davidson, Bob Fries, Jim Given, Mark Greenfield, Pippo Lionni, Eric Morgan and Frank Uher.
- 1975 Archangel Ridge, the north ridge, FA by Gerard and Barbara Roach, Brad Johnson, David Wright, Stewart Krebs and Charles Campbell. Summit reached on July 14, 1975. Subsequently skied.
- 1976 French Ridge, the South/Southeast Ridge, FA by Henri Agresti, Jean-Marie Galmiche, Gerard Creton, Herve Thivierge, Isabelle Agresti (all France) and Werner Landry (US). Summit reached on June 3 and 4, 1976.
- 1977 Infinite Spur, on the south face by Michael Kennedy and George Lowe. Ascent time 6 days.
- 1977 Southwest Ridge, Nancey Goforth, Erik LeRoy, Chris Liddle, and Murray Marvin. The summit was reached on June 25, 1977, after 47 days spent on Mount Foraker.
- 1984 Pink Panther Route Daniel Vachon, Jean Francois Gagnon, Julien Dery (Canada)and Graham Sanders (Australia). Climbing the obvious S-shaped couloir in the middle of the East face to reach directly above the buttress and straight up to the S.E. ridge. Summit reached on May 25, 1984. From May 21 to May 27.
- 1989 Infinite Spur, second ascent or route by Mark Bebie and Jim Nelson (US). Summit reached on June 24, 1989, after 13 days on the mountain.
- 1990 False Dawn, on the southeast face, first ascent by John Phelan (US) and David Sharman (UK). Summit reached on May 27, 1990, after 5 days on the mountain.
- 2016 Infinite Spur, first solo ascent and fastest ascent to date, by Colin Haley. Ascent time was 12:29 from the bergschrund to summit. The descent was completed in a whiteout via the Sultana Ridge over the ensuing 48 hours.
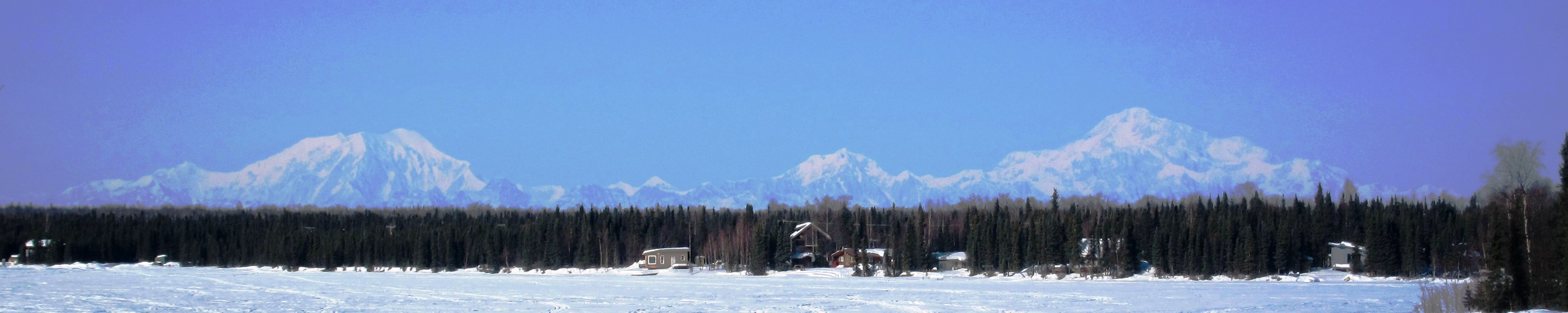
A clear view of the tallest peaks in the Alaska Range. Mount Foraker, at left, is 3,000 feet (910 m) shorter than Denali on the right. Despite being dwarfed by its neighbors, Mount Hunter (center) is taller than every US peak outside of Alaska. Photo taken from Kashwitna Lake roughly 100 miles (160 km) south of the mountains.

== See also ==
- List of mountain peaks of North America
  - List of mountain peaks of the United States
    - List of mountain peaks of Alaska
- List of the highest major summits of the United States
- List of the most prominent summits of the United States

== Notes ==
1. This ranking includes Denali North Peak as number 2.
