= Dorworth =

Dorworth is a surname. Notable people with the surname include:

- Chris Dorworth (born 1976), American politician
- Dick Dorworth (born 1938), American skier and skiing coach
