= John Bragg (climber) =

American rock climber and alpinist

Jonna Bragg
- Occupations: Alpine Climber, Rock Climber

Jonna Bragg (John) is an American rock climber and alpinist, noted for first ascents of difficult rock climbs in the Shawangunks and Colorado, and taking high-grade rock skills to Patagonia, to make the first ascent of Torre Egger in 1976 with Jim Donini and Jay Wilson.

== Notable climbs ==
- 1973 October Kansas City, 5.12b/c, Shawangunks, NY, USA - FFA, the first 5.12b climb in the Gunks and probably the first in the world.
- 1976 Torre Egger - First Ascent - with Jim Donini, and Jay Wilson from the United States, by climbing first to the col between the Egger and Cerro Torre, the Col of Conquest, and then up the ridge to the peak. The ascent was hampered by bad weather and took from December 1975 to February 22, 1976, when the 3-person team summited.
- 1976 June Cinch Crack, 5.12b, Eldorado Canyon, CO, USA - FFA, one of the first 5.12b climbs in the world.
- 1977 Yellow Wall, 5.11c, Shawangunks, NY, USA - FFA, an early 5.11c in the Gunks.
- 1977 Enduroman, 5.11c, Shawangunks, NY, USA - First ascent, early Gunks 5.11c.
- 1978 Fall Iron Cross, 5.12d, Shawangunks, NY, USA - First ascent.
- 2000 Lightning Spur, south face Thunder Mountain, Alaska Range, Alaska USA. FA with Jim Donini (USA).

== Publications ==
- 1977 Bragg, John (1977). "Torre Egger". American Alpine Journal. 21 (51). New York, NY, USA: American Alpine Club: 49–56. ISBN 978-0-930410-31-5.

== See also ==
- History of rock climbing
- List of first ascents (sport climbing)
- Lenny Alexander)
