= George Lowe (climber) =

American rock climber and alpinist (born 1944)

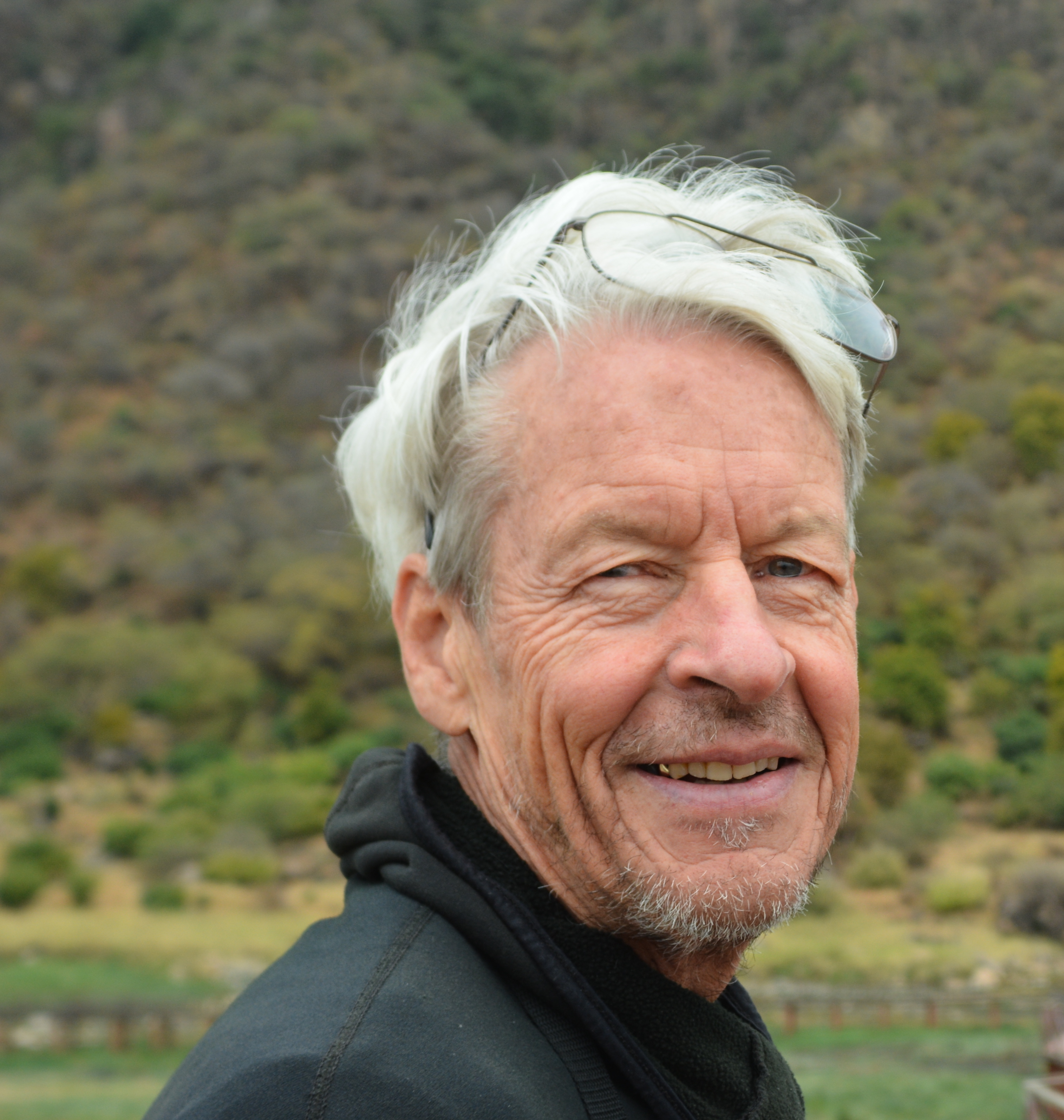
- George Lowe in Tanzania in 2015
- Born: August 16, 1944 (age 82); Chicago, Illinois, US
- Education: University of Utah (PhD)
- Known for: Alpine climber

George Henry Lowe III (born August 16, 1944) is an American rock climber and alpinist, noted for his alpine style ascents of difficult and infrequently repeated routes, and his development of traditional climbing routes in the Western United States. He pioneered winter ascents in the North American Rockies along with cousins Jeff Lowe (climber), Mike Lowe, and Greg Lowe. He is also known for his technically difficult ascents of mixed climbing faces in the Himalayas including the North Ridge of Latok I (within 200m of the summit) and the first ascent of the East Face of Mount Everest (Kangshung Face), where the "Lowe Buttress" bears his name. Lowe is currently a resident of Colorado.

== Early life ==
He was raised in Ogden, Utah, and began climbing in 1962 while attending Harvey Mudd College. He finished his undergraduate degree at the University of Utah where he later received a PhD in Physics in 1973.

== Honors and awards ==
Lowe was the 1990 recipient of the American Alpine Club's Robert and Miriam Underhill Award, renamed the Pinnacle Award in 2022. The award is given "annually to a person who, in the opinion of the selection committee, has demonstrated the highest level of skill in the mountaineering arts and who, through the application of this skill, courage, and perseverance, has achieved outstanding success in the various fields of mountaineering endeavor".

Lowe also had a successful career as a systems engineer providing consulting to the United States Intelligence Community. He was awarded the Intelligence Community Seal Medallion on February 28, 1999 from the National Foreign Intelligence Community which recognizes "sustained superior performance of duty of high value that distinctly benefits the interests of the United States".

He is an Honorary Member of the American Alpine Club which represents "the highest award the AAC has to offer. It is given to those individuals who have had a lasting and highly significant impact on the advancement of the climbing craft".

Lowe was also president of the Piolet d’Or 2014 International Jury which included Catherine Destivelle and was responsible for selecting the award-winners from the nominees. The Piolet d'Or is an award for mountaineering created by the magazine Montagnes and The Groupe de Haute Montagne

He was awarded Honorary Membership of Alpine Club (UK) in January 2020.

In October 2023, Lowe was announced the recipient of the 2023 Lifetime Achievement Award from the Piolet d'Or.

== Notable climbs ==
- 1965 Bonatti Pillar - First American Ascent - Aiguille du Dru, Mont Blanc massif, France with Chris Jones. The pillar was destroyed by rockfall in 2005.
- 1965 Dorsal Fin - First Ascent - (5.10d), Little Cottonwood Canyon, Utah, United States with Mark McQuarrie, climbed in a pair of tight hiking boots. Originally graded 5.9
- 1965 Mount Owen (3942m) - First Winter Ascent, Grand Teton National Park with Mike Lowe
- 1968 North Face of the Grand Teton (4199m) - First Winter Ascent, Grand Teton National Park with Rick Horn, Greg and Mike Lowe
- 1971 North Face, Piramide de Garcilaso (5585m) - Second Ascent with Mike Lowe and North Face, Huandoy Norte (6395m) - First Ascent of new route with Perutah Expedition members. Both Cordillera Blanca, Peru .
- 1972 West Face of the Grand Teton - First Winter Ascent, Grand Teton National Park with Jeff Lowe
- 1972 North Face, Mount Alberta (3619m) - First Ascent, Canadian Rockies, Canada with Jock Glidden.
- 1973 South Face, Devils Thumb (2767m) - First Ascent, Coast Mountains, Alaska with Chris Jones and Lito Tejada-Flores.
- 1974 North Face (VI 5.10 A4), North Twin Peak (3631m) - First Ascent, Canadian Rockies, with Chris Jones widely regarded as some of the best alpinism of the era.
- 1977 Infinite Spur, First Ascent on the south face of Mount Foraker, Alaska Range with Michael Kennedy. Ascent time 6 days.
- 1978 North Ridge, Latok I, Karakorum Range, Pakistan. Attempt with Michael Kennedy, Jim Donini and Jeff Lowe (climber), highest attempt to within 100m of summit until 2018 (all USA).
- 1980 North Face Mount Geikie, Canadian Rockies with Dean Hannibal
- 1983 Kangshung Face, Everest, First Ascent. Summited on same day as Jay Cassell, and Dan Reid following the summits of Carlos Buhler, Kim Momb and Louis Reichardt the prior day (all USA). Expedition focused on limiting risk to Sherpas. At the time, considered the most difficult route up Everest.
- 1990 Northeast Ridge, Dhaulagiri I (8167m), Nepal, First American Solo Ascent, part of international expedition with Carlos Buhler, lt:Dainius Makauskas of Lithuania (deceased), and Nuru Sherpa of Nepal (injured).
- 2015 West Face Couloir, Mount Huntington, Alaska summited with Joe Terravecchia and Mark Richey, Lowe was 70 years old on this trip.
- 2015 Western Breach, Mount Kilimanjaro, Tanzania with two of his daughters.
- 2019 North Ridge, Mount Stuart, Cascade Range, Washington with Mike Carr.
- 2019 Upper Exum Ridge, Grand Teton, Wyoming one day ascent of the Grand, one week before 75th birthday with daughter.

== Gallery ==
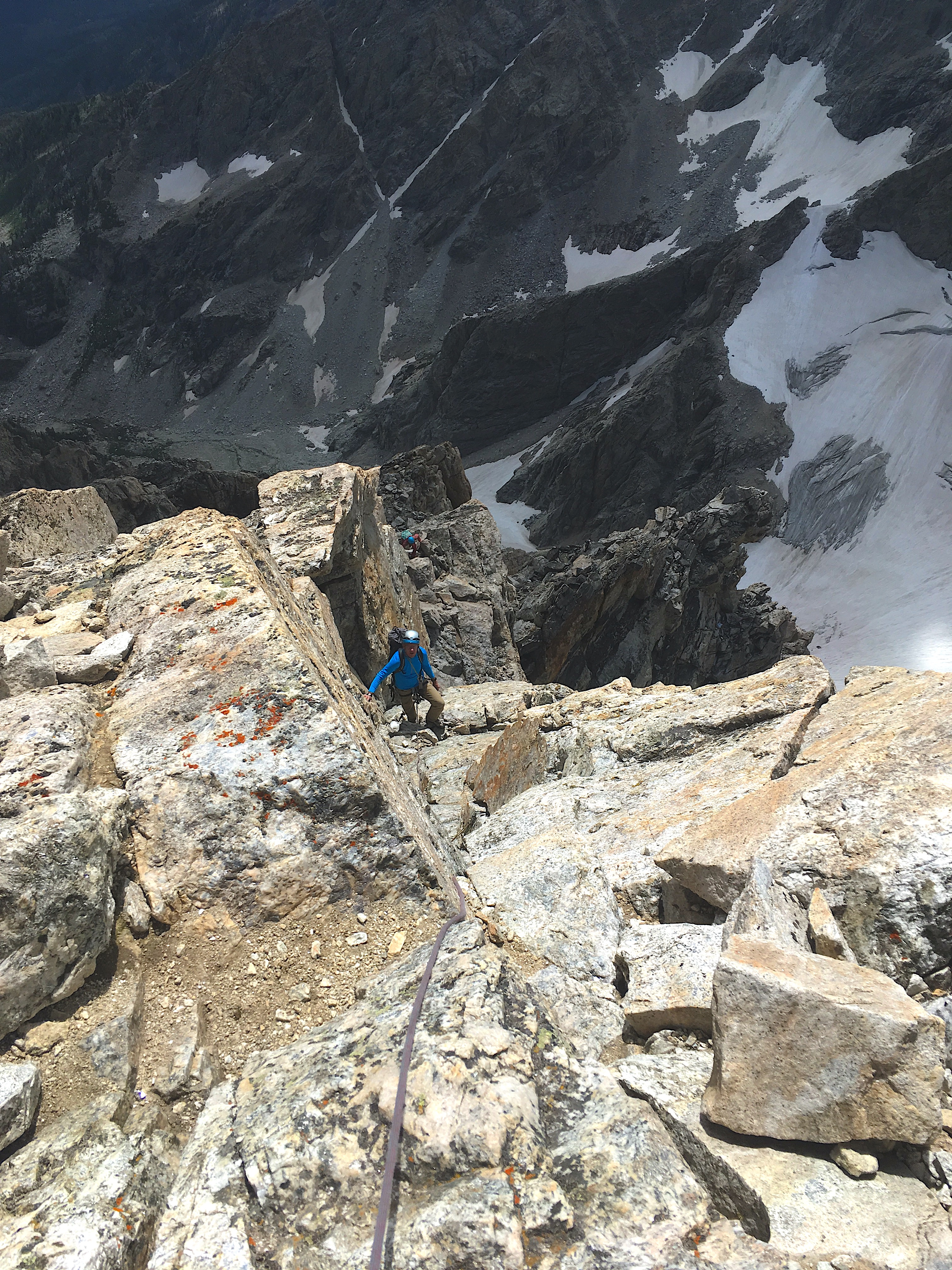
Lowe climbing the famous V Pitch on the Upper Exum Ridge of the Grand Teton in August 2019 for his 75th birthday.
