= Dick Dorworth =

American skier and author

Personal information
- Nationality: American

Sport
- Sport: Skiing

Dick Dorworth is a noted ski racer, coach and world record holder. Dorworth is the author of four books, Night Driving, The Perfect Turn, The Straight Course, and Climbing to Freedom.

He was inducted into the U.S. Ski and Snowboard Hall of Fame in April 2012.

Dorworth was also a member of the "Fun Hogs" expedition (together with Yvon Chouinard, Chris Jones, Douglas Tompkins, and Lito Tejada-Flores), who made the third ascent of Mount Fitz Roy in Patagonia in 1968. Footage of the expedition was made into an adventure film, Mountain of Storms, which also includes footage of Dorworth's earlier speed skiing record (set at Portillo, Chile, some time before the expedition) and brief remarks by him about this achievement.

He lives in Ketchum, Idaho, and Bozeman, Montana and graduated from Reno High School, Nevada in 1956.
