= Mount Stevens (Alaska) =

Mountain in Matanuska-Susitna Borough, Alaska, US

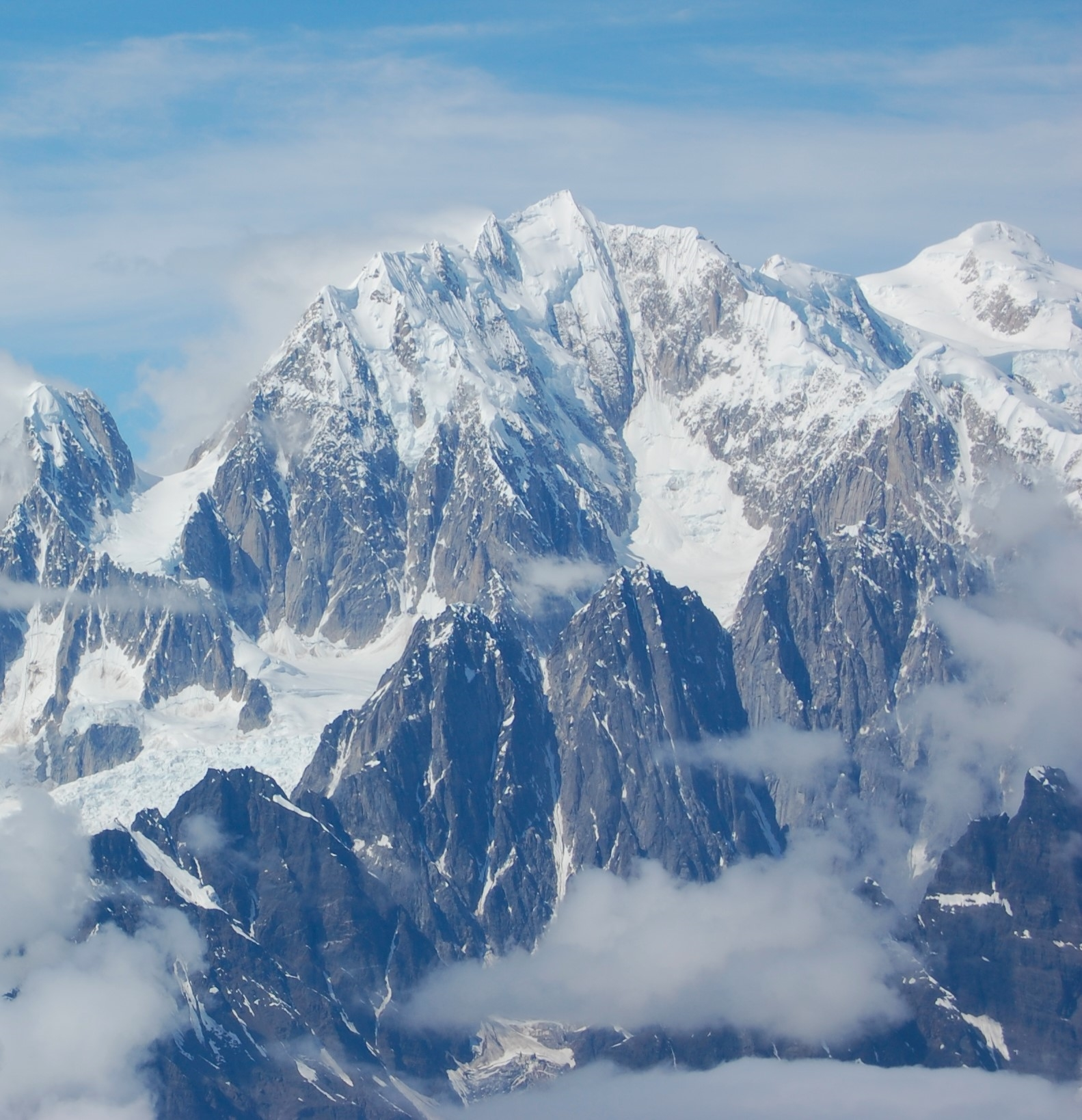
- Southeast aspect

Highest point
- Elevation: 13,966 ft (4,257 m) NGVD 29
- Prominence: 1,066 ft (325 m)
- Coordinates: 62°55′14″N 151°03′59″W

Geography
- Location within Alaska
- Location: Denali National Park, Alaska, U.S.
- Parent range: Alaska Range
- Topo map: USGS Talkeetna D-3

Mount Stevens is a mountain located in Matanuska-Susitna Borough, Alaska. Mount Stevens is flanked to the northwest by Mount Hunter, and is about 10 miles (16 km) south of Denali.

The mountain was named in 2010, after Ted Stevens (1923–2010), who had represented Alaska in the U.S. Senate from 1968 to 2009. It had been the highest unnamed peak in Alaska, though unofficially called South Hunter Peak.

Mount Stevens stands within the watershed of the Susitna River, which drains into Cook Inlet. The east sides of Mount Stevens drain into the Tokositna Glacier, thence into the Tokositna River, Chulitna River, and the Susitna. The west sides of Stevens drain into Kahiltna Glacier, thence into Kahiltna River and the Susitna.

== Gallery ==
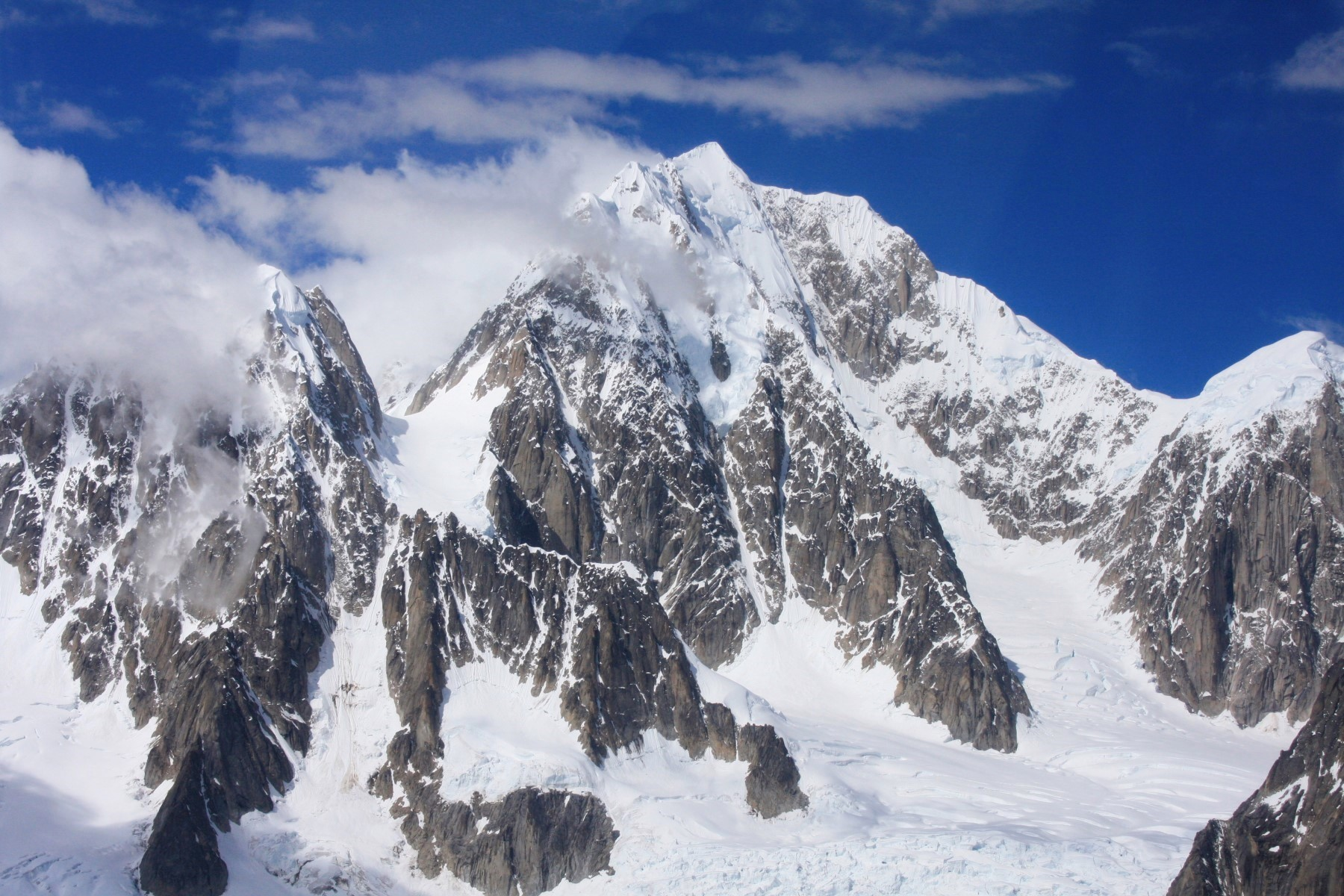
Mt. Stevens from southeast

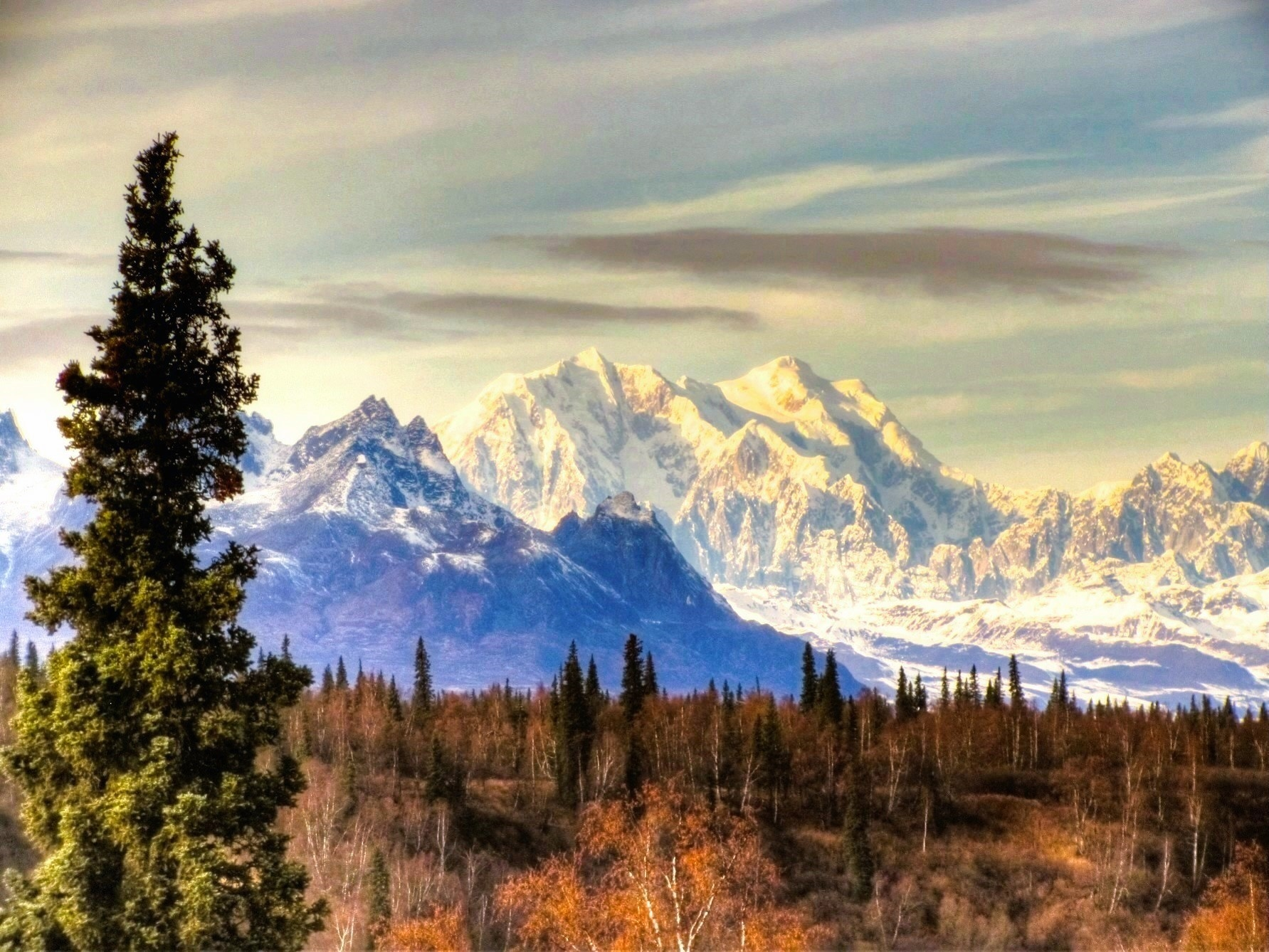
Mount Stevens / Mount Hunter centered.
