= Thomas Graham Brown =

Scottish mountaineer and physiologist (1882–1965)

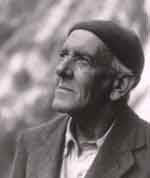
- Born: 27 March 1882; Edinburgh, Scotland
- Died: 28 October 1965 (aged 83); Edinburgh, Scotland
- Education: University of Edinburgh
- Awards: Fellow of the Royal Society (1927)
- Scientific career
- Fields: physiologist

Thomas Graham Brown FRS (usually known as T. Graham Brown; 27 March 1882 – 28 October 1965) was a Scottish mountaineer and physiologist, most famous for finding three new routes up the east face of Mont Blanc.

== Life and academic work ==
Graham Brown was born in Edinburgh on 27 March 1882. His father, Dr John Joseph Graham Brown was a President of the Royal College of Physicians of Edinburgh from 1912 to 1914. His mother was Jane Pasley Hay Thorburn. The family lived at 63 Castle Street in Edinburgh's New Town.

Thomas studied science and medicine at the University of Edinburgh, gaining an MD in 1912 with a thesis on the rhythmic movement of decerebrate animals, followed in 1914 with a DSc from the same institution for a thesis on immediate and successive effects of compound stimulation in spinal preparations, before moving to Glasgow and Liverpool. Although his work was largely ignored for many years, he was the first to propose a half-centre model of motor neurons in which two groups of spinal neurons that are both reciprocally organized and mutually inhibiting are capable of producing basic rhythmic movement. His theory reflects today's widely accepted concept of central pattern generators in motor neurons. However, at the time, his views opposed those of his mentor, Sir Charles Scott Sherrington, who believed that the locomotor movements observed in decerebrate animals were caused by a chain of reflexes initiated by proprioception feedback. By contrast, Brown's research demonstrated that in the absence of cutaneous and proprioceptive signals, deafferented animals were still capable of generating alternating muscular rhythms. Unknown to him, his proprietary work was ahead of his time, only making waves in the field of motor control fifty years after it was originally published, when Lundberg and Jankowska's study in the 1960s supported his half-centre model.

Brown went on to serve in the Royal Army Medical Corps during the First World War. After the war, he continued his work on the physiology of the nervous system, particularly reflex movements and posture, and in 1920 he accepted the Chair in Physiology at the University of Wales at Cardiff. In 1927 he was elected a Fellow of the Royal Society.

He died on 28 October 1965 and was buried with his parents on the hidden southern terrace of Dean Cemetery in western Edinburgh.

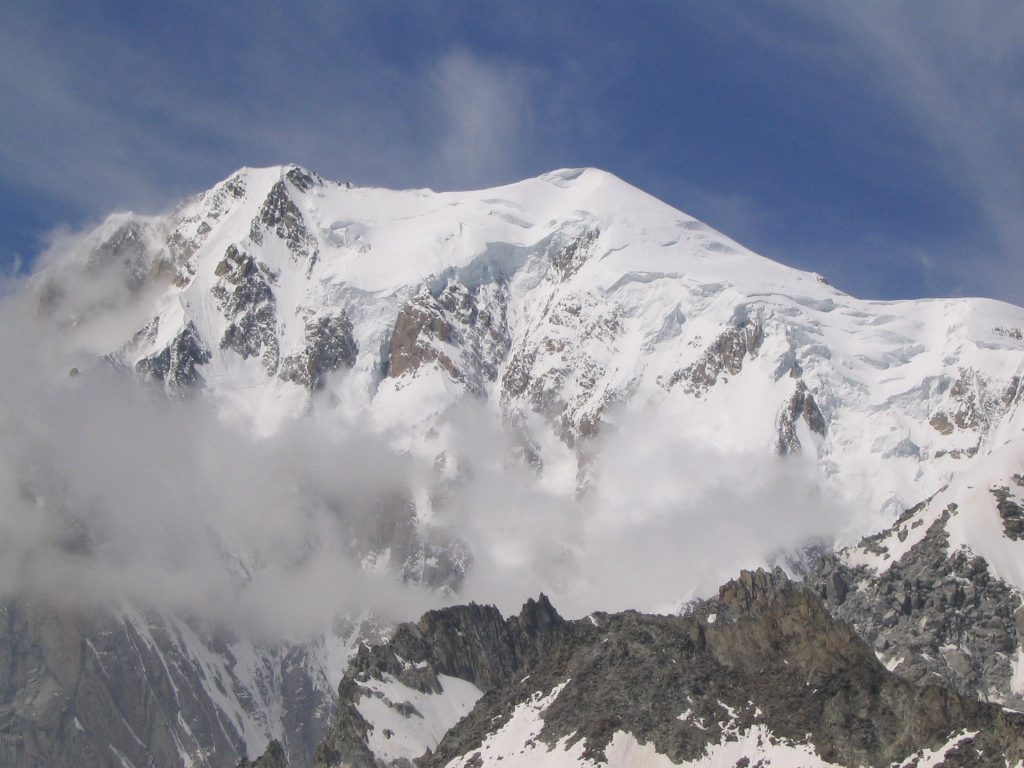
The east or Brenva face of Mont Blanc, seen from Pointe Helbronner

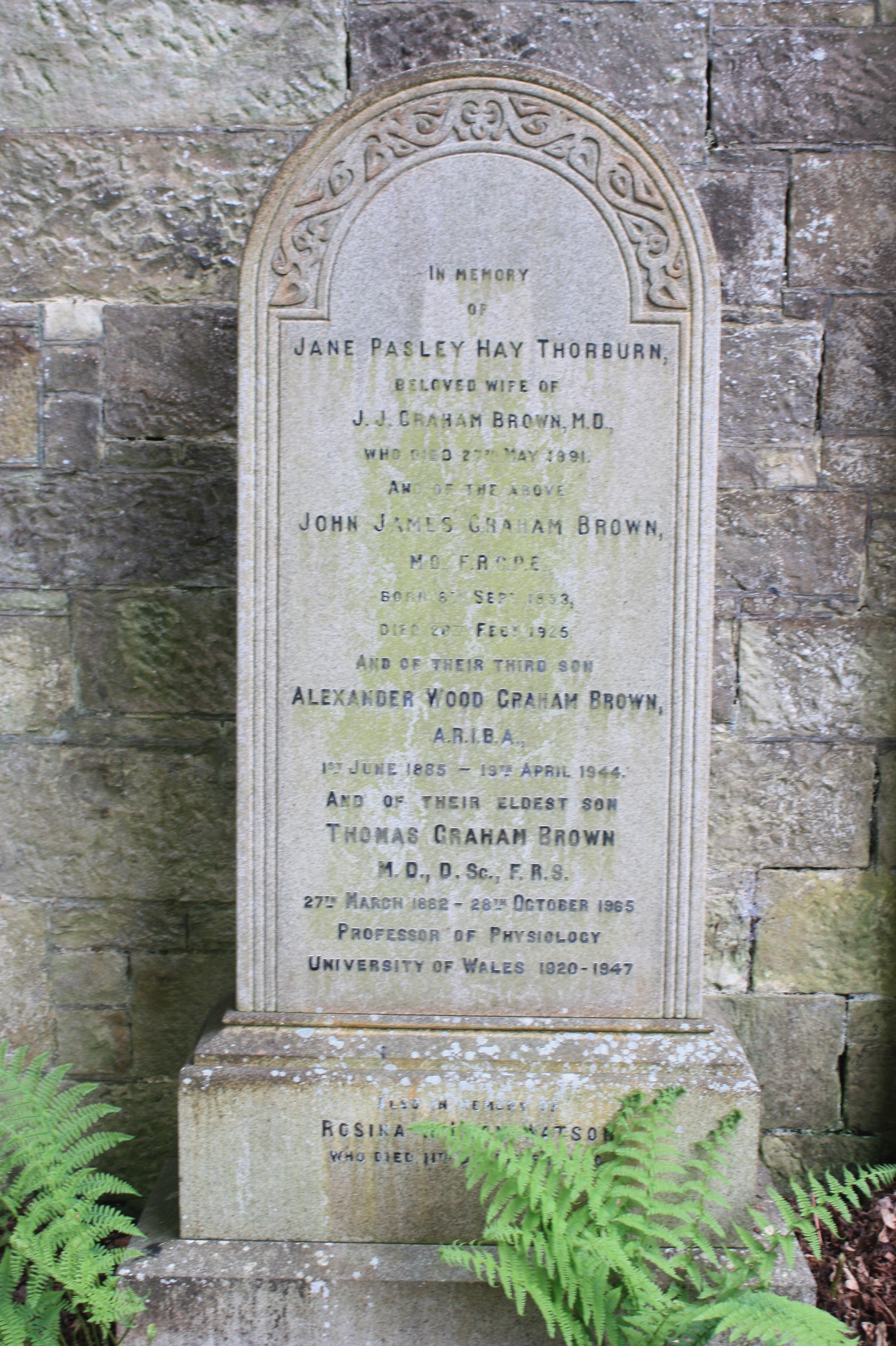
The grave of Thomas Graham Brown, Dean Cemetery, Edinburgh

== Alpinism ==
The east or Brenva face of Mont Blanc was the scene of his most famous first ascents, his three new routes – the Sentinelle Rouge, Route Major and the Pear Buttress – constituting "the most important new routes made by British climbers in the Alps in the inter-war years." In an article in the Alpine Journal, Graham Brown wrote

The great Brenva face of Mont Blanc de Courmayeur and Mont Blanc had not been climbed between the line of Güssfeldt's ascent of the Aiguille Blanche de Pétérey and the line of the Brenva route until Smythe and I had the good fortune to discover the 'Sentinel' route in 1927.

He climbed the first of these routes, the Sentinelle Rouge, with Frank Smythe on 1–2 September 1927. Smythe also accompanied him on the first ascent of Route Major on 6–7 August 1928. According to Claire Engel, "both expeditions were among the most notable of the century". The third route – the Pear Buttress – ascended the large rock buttress on the left of the face, and was made by Graham Brown, together with Alexander Graven and Alfred Aufdenblatten, on 5 August 1933.

Graham Brown was the editor of the Alpine Journal from 1949 to 1953.

In 1935, Graham Brown made the first ascent of Alaska's 5304 m Mount Foraker in company with Charles Houston and Chychele Waterston.

In 1936, Graham Brown was part of the joint British–American team that made the first ascent of Nanda Devi in the Indian Himalaya, though only two of the party, Bill Tilman and Noel Odell, made the summit.

== Bequests ==
Graham Brown bequeathed his collection of alpine and mountaineering literature, consisting of some 20,000 items, to the National Library of Scotland. He left his house for the use of the Edinburgh University Mountaineering Club. The original house was sold by Edinburgh University as part of their sale of assets to meet debts in the 1990s. After protests by members of the time, the university named a flat in newly constructed student accommodation "Graham Brown House"; this flat is still used by the club.
