= Lowe Alpine =

American outdoor equipment manufacturer

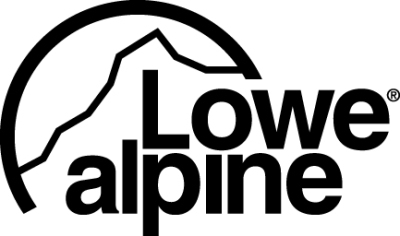

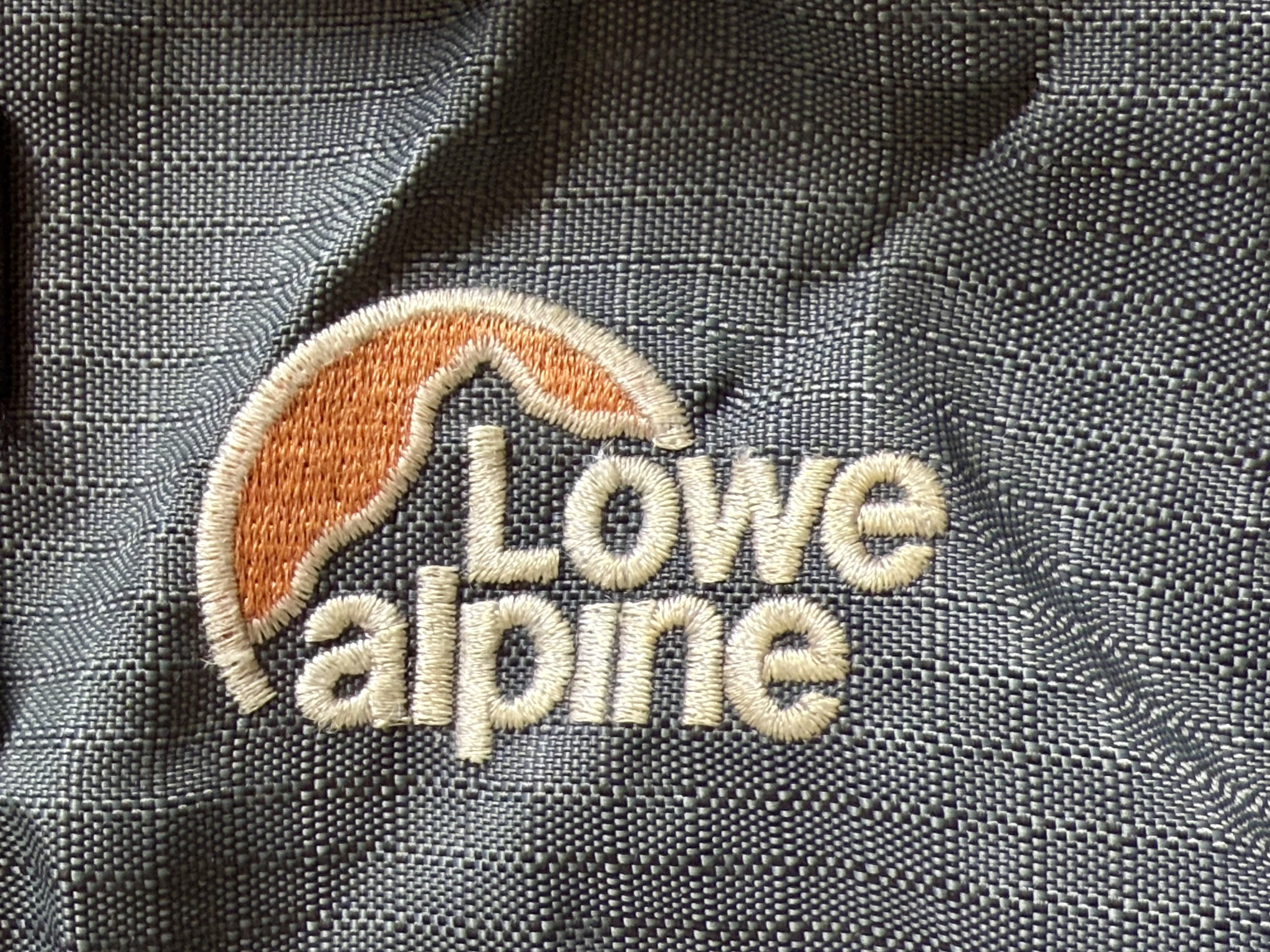
- Lowe Alpine Logo
- Company type: Subsidiary
- Industry: Mountaineering equipment
- Founded: 1967; 59 years ago
- Founder: Mike Lowe, Greg Lowe and Jeff Lowe
- Headquarters: Colorado, US
- Products: Backpacks
- Parent: Equip Outdoor Technologies
- Website: rab.equipment/lowe-alpine-backpacks

Lowe Alpine is a US outdoor equipment manufacturer founded in Utah in 1972 by brothers Mike, Greg and Jeff Lowe. Today it is owned by Rab.

== History ==
In 1967 Greg created a back pack, named the Expedition Pack, with internal phenolic resin laminate stays, later revised to 6061 aluminium flat bar, being a frame which facilitated the carrying of heavy loads and a unique chest strap designed to attach to a haul rope while still wearing the pack. This sturdy special chest strap was changed to a chest-compression strap as well as the use of 6061 frame bars during the manufacturing period at High Touring, in Salt Lake City, Utah. In 1972 Mike borrowed $3,000 to register Lowe Alpine Systems as a manufacturing business.

The brand was sold to Rab in 2011, and in 2014 it was announced that Lowe Alpine would stop making clothing.
