= Rab (company) =

Outdoor-sporting-equipment maker

- Company type: Subsidiary
- Industry: Mountaineering clothing, Climbing clothing, Retail
- Founded: 1981; 45 years ago
- Founder: Rab Carrington, Rhys Kelly
- Headquarters: Somercotes, Derbyshire, UK
- Products: insulated jackets, waterproof jackets, baselayers, sleeping bags, tents
- Parent: Equip Outdoor Technologies
- Website: rab.equipment

Rab is a British manufacturer of clothing and equipment for climbing and mountaineering. The firm was founded in 1981 by Scottish climber Rab Carrington.

== History ==
=== Rab Carrington and founding ===
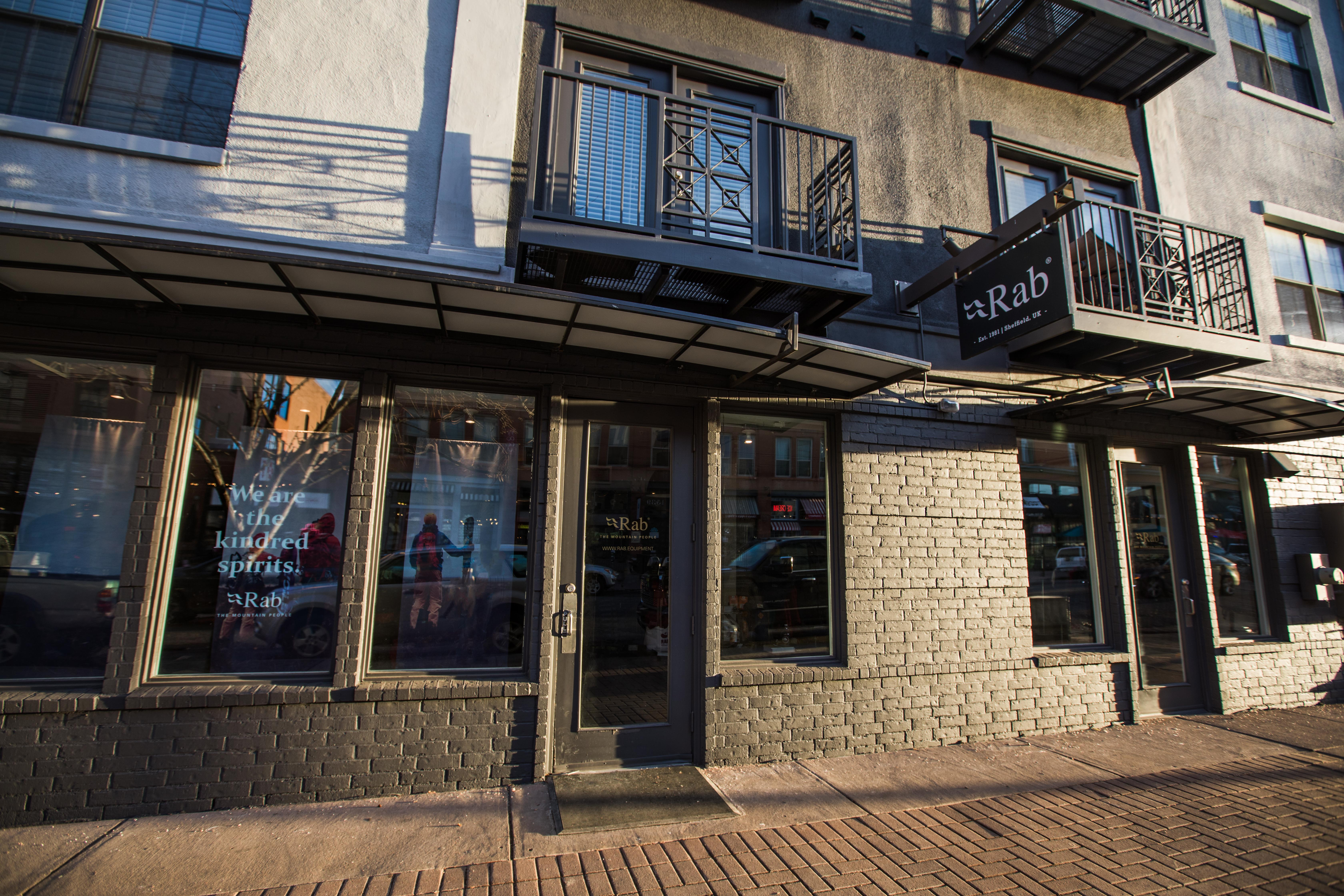
Rab's clothing store on Platte Street, Denver, Colorado

Rab Carrington (born 1947 in Glasgow) devoted himself to rock climbing and mountaineering in the late 1960s and 1970s, taking on expeditions in the Alps and Himalayas. In 1973, he took part in an expedition to Patagonia, Argentina, but when his group arrived in Buenos Aires, they found that their climbing equipment had not been shipped from Liverpool due to a dock strike. Unable to start the expedition without his equipment, Carrington instead stayed in Argentina for six months, and learned how to make sleeping bags himself. On his return, Carrington moved to Sheffield due to its proximity to the Peak District, and in 1980, Carrington began hand-stitching and selling his own sleeping bags from the attic of his house.

Demand for his sleeping bags grew, and the following year Carrington founded Rab and moved production to a factory in Sheffield. Drawing on his climbing experience, Carrington's clothes focused on lightweight, durable and high-quality products.

=== Recent history ===
Rab Carrington retired in 2007. The firm, along with competitor Lowe Alpine, were later both purchased by Equip Outdoor Technologies.

== Clothing and Gear ==
Rab's down jackets, sleeping bags and expedition wear are designed with cold weather in mind, and employ European goose and duck down that is certified to the Responsible Down Standard. A fluorocarbon-free water repellence treatment is also applied to the down used in clothing and sleeping bags in order to reduce water saturation. Like nearly all outerwear manufacturers, Rab also uses synthetic insulation, both alone and in conjunction with down.
