= Michael Kennedy (climber) =

American rock climber, photographer and writer

Michael Kennedy is an American rock climber, alpinist, photographer, writer and editor.

From 1974 to 1998 he was the editor of Climbing magazine, an American climbing magazine. In March 2009, he took the position of Editor-in-Chief of Alpinist magazine. His son Hayden Kennedy, also a renowned climber, died in October 2017.

== Notable climbs ==
- 1977 Lowe-Kennedy, on the north face of Mount Hunter, Alaska Range, Alaska, USA with George Lowe.
- 1977 Infinite Spur, on the south face of Mount Foraker, Alaska Range, Alaska, USA with George Lowe.
- 1978 North Ridge on Latok I, Karakorum Range, Pakistan. Attempt with Jim Donini, George Lowe and Jeff Lowe (climber).
- 1985 Northeast Face on Ama Dablam, Nepal. FA of route with Carlos Buhler, Dec 1-7, 1985.
- 1994 Wall of Shadows, (Alaska Grade 6, AI6+ 5.9 A4), Mount Hunter, Alaska Range Alaska, USA. FA with Greg Child.

== Writings ==
- Kennedy, Michael (1979). "Latok I". American Alpine Journal. 22 (53). NYC, NY, USA: American Alpine Club: 24–28. ISSN 0065-6925.
- Kennedy, Michael (1987). "A Hidden Gem - Ama Dablam's Northeast Face". American Alpine Journal. 29 (61). NYC, NY, USA: American Alpine Club: 32–41. ISBN 0-930410-29-7.
- Kennedy, Michael (1995). "Shadows of Doubt, Mount Hunter". American Alpine Journal. 37 (69). Golden, CO, USA: American Alpine Club: 1–10. ISBN 0-930410-61-0.
