= Jeff Lowe =

American mountain climber (1950-2018)

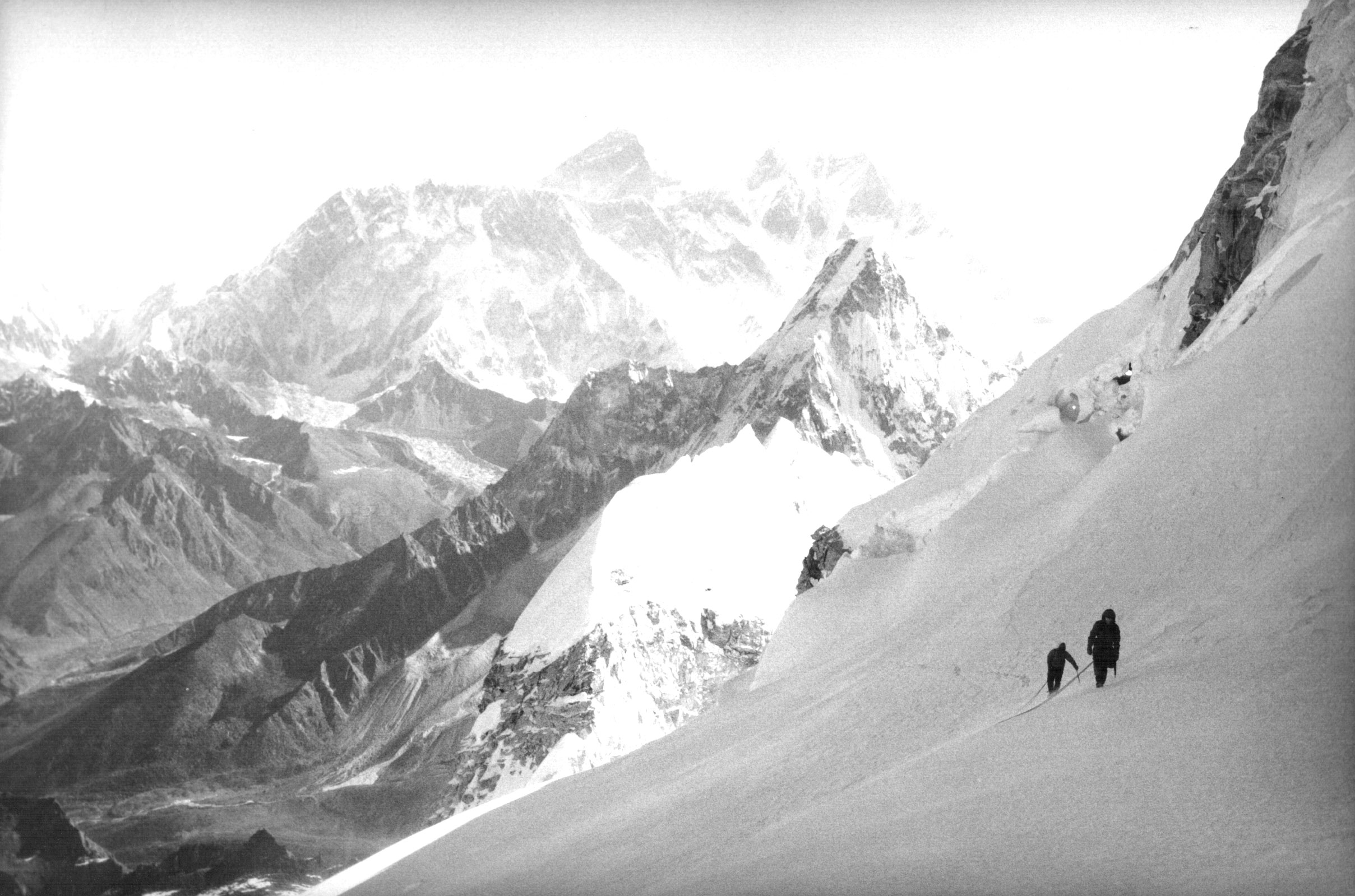
Alison Hargreaves and Jeff Lowe climbing Kangtega, 1 May 1986

Jeff Lowe (September 13, 1950 - August 24, 2018) was an American alpinist from Ogden, Utah who was known for his visionary climbs and first ascents established in the US and Canadian Rockies, Alps and Himalayas.

He was a proponent of the Alpine style, where small teams travel fast with minimal gear. He is also credited as the inventor of mixed climbing. Lowe made over 1000 first ascents. Lowe was a co-founder of Lowe Alpine along with his brothers Greg Lowe and Mike Lowe. Jeff Lowe is the cousin of George Henry Lowe III.

Lowe suffered from a neurological disease similar to ALS for approximately 18 years, until he died on August 24, 2018, in Colorado, United States.

== Career achievements ==
Lowe is credited with bringing modern ice climbing to the United States from Europe as well as pushing the limits of mixed climbing. He was the founder of companies such as Latok Mountain Gear and Cloudwalker. He helped to invent the world's first softshell jacket while at Latok Mountain Gear. Lowe was featured ice climbing on the cover of the December 11, 1978 issue of Sports Illustrated. Lowe worked for the Colorado Outward Bound School in his earlier years.

Lowe is credited with introducing ice climbing in the Winter X Games as well as starting the Ouray Ice Festival. He also was the organizer in Snowbird (Utah) in 1988, of the first international rock climbing competition ever held in the US. Lowe received an Honorary Lifetime Membership in the American Alpine Club, the club's highest honors, for his climbing achievements, contributions to the climbing community, and vision. He was also awarded Honorary Lifetime Membership in the Alpine Club of the United Kingdom.

Lowe is the subject of the Award Winning 2014 biographical documentary film Jeff Lowe's Metanoia, produced by Connie Self and directed by Jim Aikman.

In 2017, he was awarded the Piolets D'or Lifetime Achievement Award in France and was inducted into the Boulder Sports Hall of Fame in Colorado.

== Notable ascents ==
- 1958 Grand Teton, Wyoming with father
- 1971 Moonlight Buttress, Zion National Park, Utah, USA. FA with Mike Weis
- 1972 First Winter Ascent of Grand Teton's West Face with George Lowe
- 1973 North Face, Wetterhorn Peak (Colorado), San Juan Mountains, Colorado. FA with Paul Hogan
- 1973 Northeast Corner, Keeler Needle, Sierra Nevada, California; NCCS V F9 or F10 A2, FA with John Weiland
- 1974 Bridal Veil Falls, Telluride, Colorado, FA with Mike Weis;
- 1974 Green River Lake Dihedral, Squaretop, Wind River Range, Wyoming - NCCS V F9, FA with Greg Lowe
- 1975 Mount Kitchener's Grand Central Couloir with Mike Weis
- 1979 Ama Dablam, solo, first alpine-style ascent
- 1980 Skyang Kangri - attempt
- 1982 Kwangde Ri's north face, with David Breashears
- 1983 Pumori, first solo ascent via a new route on the south face
- 1985 Bird Brain Boulevard, Ouray, Colorado
- 1989 Tawoche, Northeast Face, with John Roskelley
- 1990 Trango (Nameless) Tower, Yugoslav route with Catherine Destivelle
- 1991 Metanoia, a new direct route on the Eiger's north face, that he opened solo and without bolts
- 1994 Octopussy (WI6, M8), Vail, Colorado; Lowe's climb was considered the birth of modern mixed climbing.

His attempt on the north ridge of Latok I with Jim Donini, Michael Kennedy, and George Henry Lowe III in 1978, is considered by many to be the most difficult unfinished climb in the world.

== Publications and instructional videos ==
- The Ice Experience (1979)
- Climbing (1986)
- Lowe, Jeff (1996). Ice World: Techniques and Experiences of Modern Ice Climbing. Seattle, WA, USA: Mountaineers Books. ISBN 0-89886-446-1.
- Waterfall Ice (1996)
- Alpine Ice: Jeff Lowe's Climbing Techniques (1997)
- Clean Walls (2004)
