= Greg Lowe =

American rock climber and cinematographer

Greg Lowe (born 1949 in Pittsburgh PA) is a noted mountain climber, photographer, Academy Award nominated cinematographer, and co-founder of Lowe Alpine, along with his brothers Jeff and Mike Lowe. He is a cousin of climber George Lowe. In the mid-1960s, he led some of the most difficult new rock climbs in the world.

- Crack of Doom 5.11c 1965 City of Rocks ID
- Pass or Flail 5.11d 1965 Ogden UT
- Infinite 5.11c R/X 1967 City of Rocks ID
- Vice Grips 5.11d 1969 City of Rocks ID
- Macabre Wall 5.12a/b 1967 Ogden UT

Lowe invented the internal frame backpack. He established Lowe Alpine in his workshed in Colorado in 1967. In addition to backpacking gear Lowe is a pioneer in rock climbing hardware, developing some of the first cam-lever protection devices.

He created the Lowepro line of protective camera bags.

== See also ==
- History of rock climbing
- List of grade milestones in rock climbing
