= Mount Hunter (Alaska) =

Mountain in Alaska

- Begguya
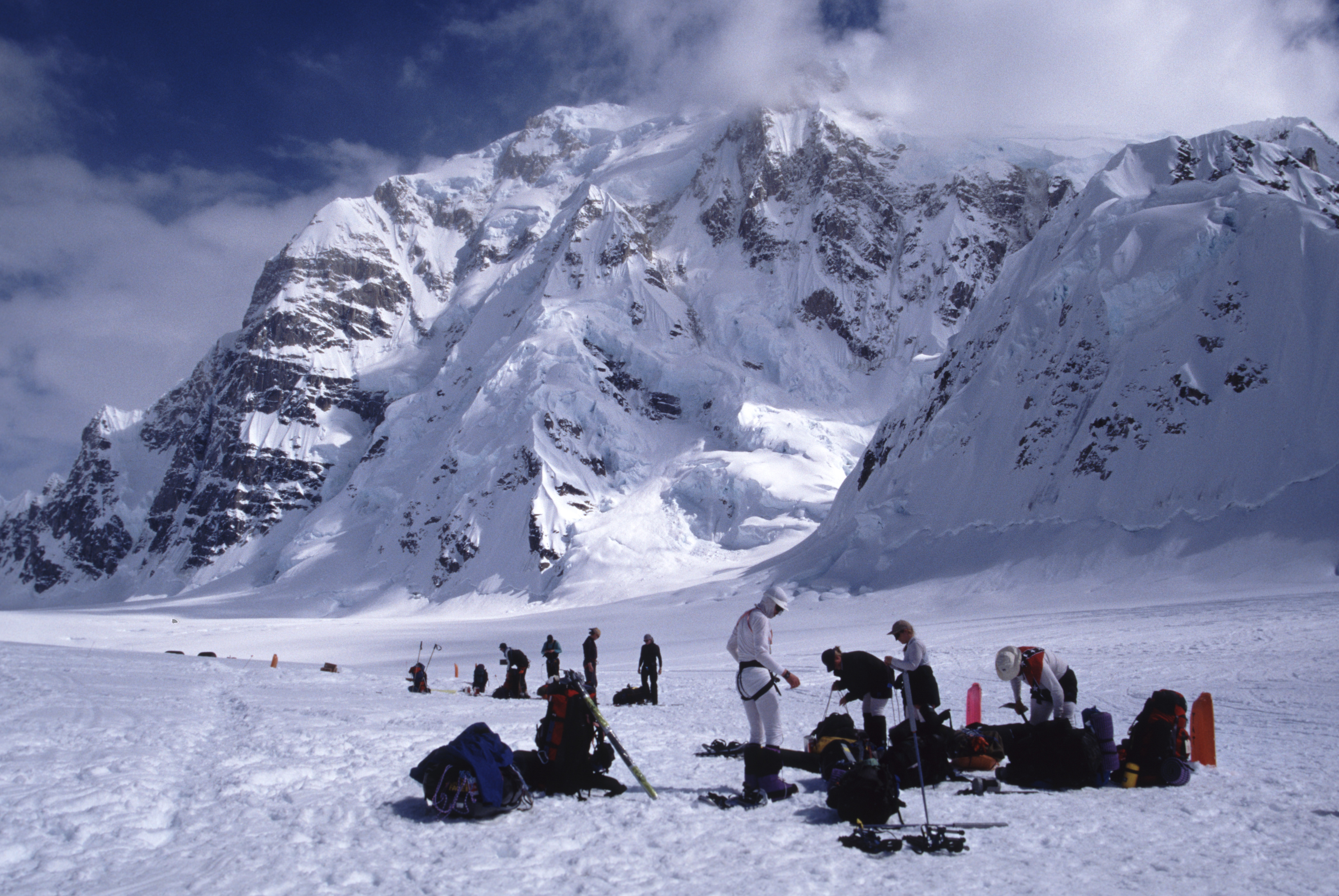
- Mount Hunter from the northwest (Kahilta Base Camp)

Highest point
- Elevation: 14,573 ft (4,442 m); NAVD88
- Prominence: 4,653 ft (1,418 m)
- Isolation: 6.88 mi (11.07 km)
- Listing: North America highest peaks 22nd; US highest major peaks 10th; Alaska highest major peaks 10th
- Coordinates: 62°57′03″N 151°05′22″W

Geography
- Location within Alaska
- Interactive map of Mount Hunter
- Location: Matanuska-Susitna Borough, Alaska, U.S.
- Parent range: Alaska Range
- Topo map: USGS Talkeetna D-3

Climbing
- First ascent: 1954 by Fred Beckey, Heinrich Harrer, Henry Meybohm
- Easiest route: serious snow/ice/rock climb (Alaska Grade 4, 5.8, AI 3)

Mount Hunter or Begguya is a mountain in Denali National Park in Alaska. It is approximately eight miles (13 km) south of Denali, the highest peak in North America. "Begguya" means child (of Denali) in the Dena'ina language. Mount Hunter is the third-highest major peak in the Alaska Range.

Mount Hunter has a complex structure: it is topped by a large, low-angled glacier plateau, connecting the North (Main) Summit and the South Summit (13,965 feet or 4,257 m). Long, corniced ridges extend in various directions; between them are exceptionally steep faces.

== Naming of the mountain ==
The native name for the mountain is Begguya, meaning "Denali's Child". Early prospectors referred to the mountain as Mount Roosevelt. In 1903, Robert Dunn, a reporter for the New York Commercial Advertiser, visited the area as part of Frederick Cook's attempt to climb Denali. He bestowed the name of his aunt Anna Falconnet Hunter (1885–1941), who financed his trip, on a high nearby mountain, prominent from the northwest. This was, in fact, a different peak, now known as Kahiltna Dome. The name Hunter was mistakenly applied to the present-day Mount Hunter by a government surveyor in 1906.

In October 2010, the South Summit was named Mount Stevens, after Ted Stevens (1923–2010), a former senator of Alaska.

== Climbing history ==
Despite being much lower in elevation than Mount McKinley (formerly Denali), Mount Hunter is a more difficult climb, due to its steep faces and corniced ridges; it also sees far less traffic than its larger neighbor.

Fred Beckey, Heinrich Harrer, and Henry Meybohm completed the first ascent in 1954, via the long West Ridge; this was a great accomplishment for the time and used techniques such as extensive front-pointing which were unusual in the climbing world.

Beginning in 1977, with Michael Kennedy and George Lowe's climb of a route on the northwest face of Mount Hunter, this steep rock and ice face has been the scene of many landmark hard climbs.

=== Notable ascents ===
- 1954 West Ridge - first ascent of the peak by Fred Beckey, Heinrich Harrer, and Henry Meybohm
- 1977 Lowe-Kennedy, on the north face.
- 1978 Southeast Spur by John Mallon Waterman (solo, 145 days)
- 1981 Moonflower Buttress (Alaska Grade 6: 5.8 A3 AI6 6100') first ascent to last rock band by Mugs Stump and Paul Aubry (NZ).
- 1983 Moonflower Buttress to summit, first complete ascent by Todd Bibler and Doug Klewin.
- 1985 "Diamond Arete" (Alaska Grade 6) first ascent by Jack Tackle and Jim Donini
- 1989 Northwest Face first ascent by Conrad Anker and Seth 'S.T.' Shaw, summit attained July 3, 1989.
- 1994 Deprivation, (Alaska Grade 6, Alpine ED+, 90deg ice) first ascent by Scott Backes and Mark Francis Twight.
- 1994 Wall of Shadows, (Alaska Grade 6, AI6+ 5.9 A4) first ascent by Greg Child and Michael Kennedy.

== Gallery ==
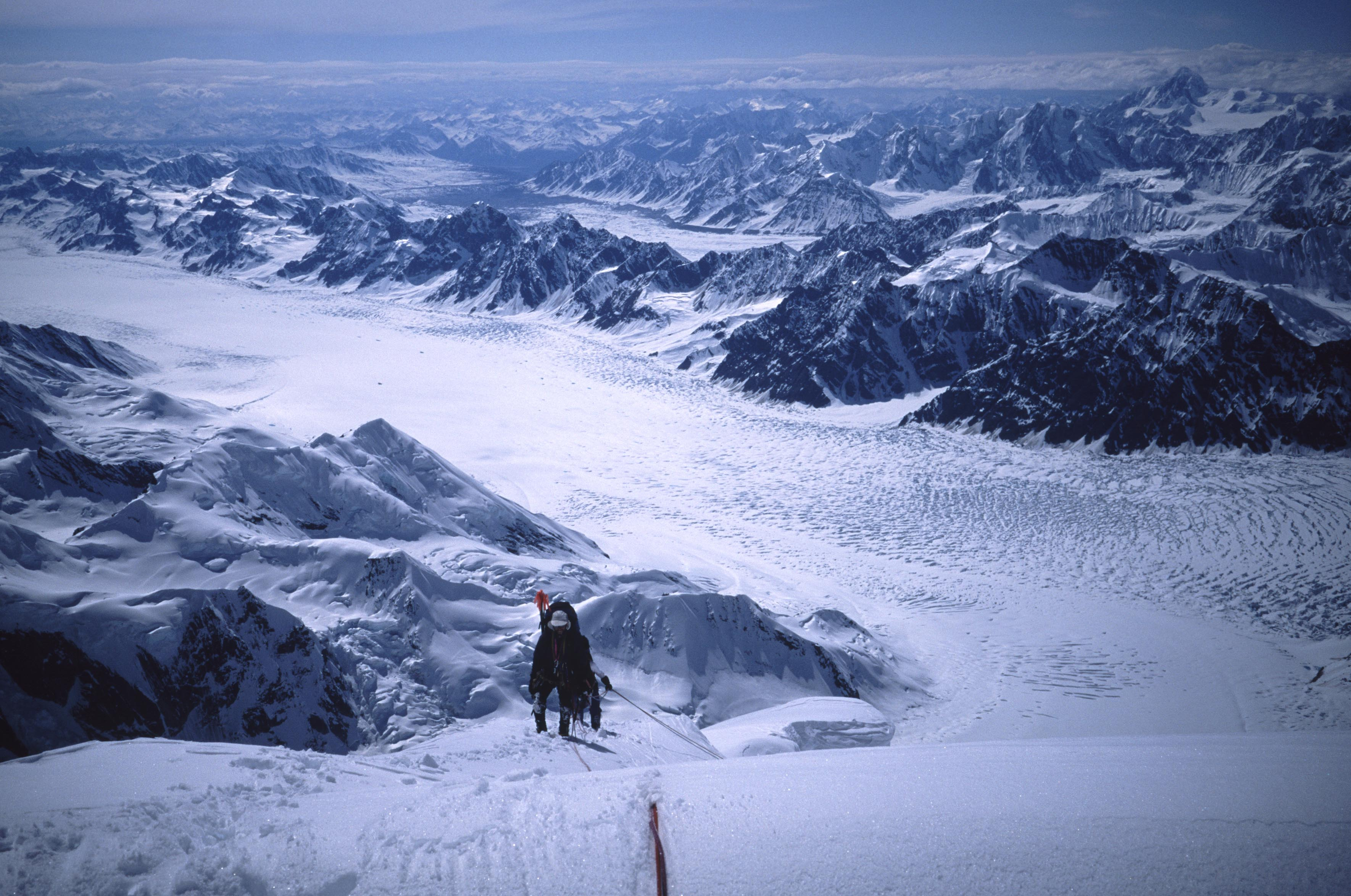
Looking down the SW Ridge at about 10,500 ft

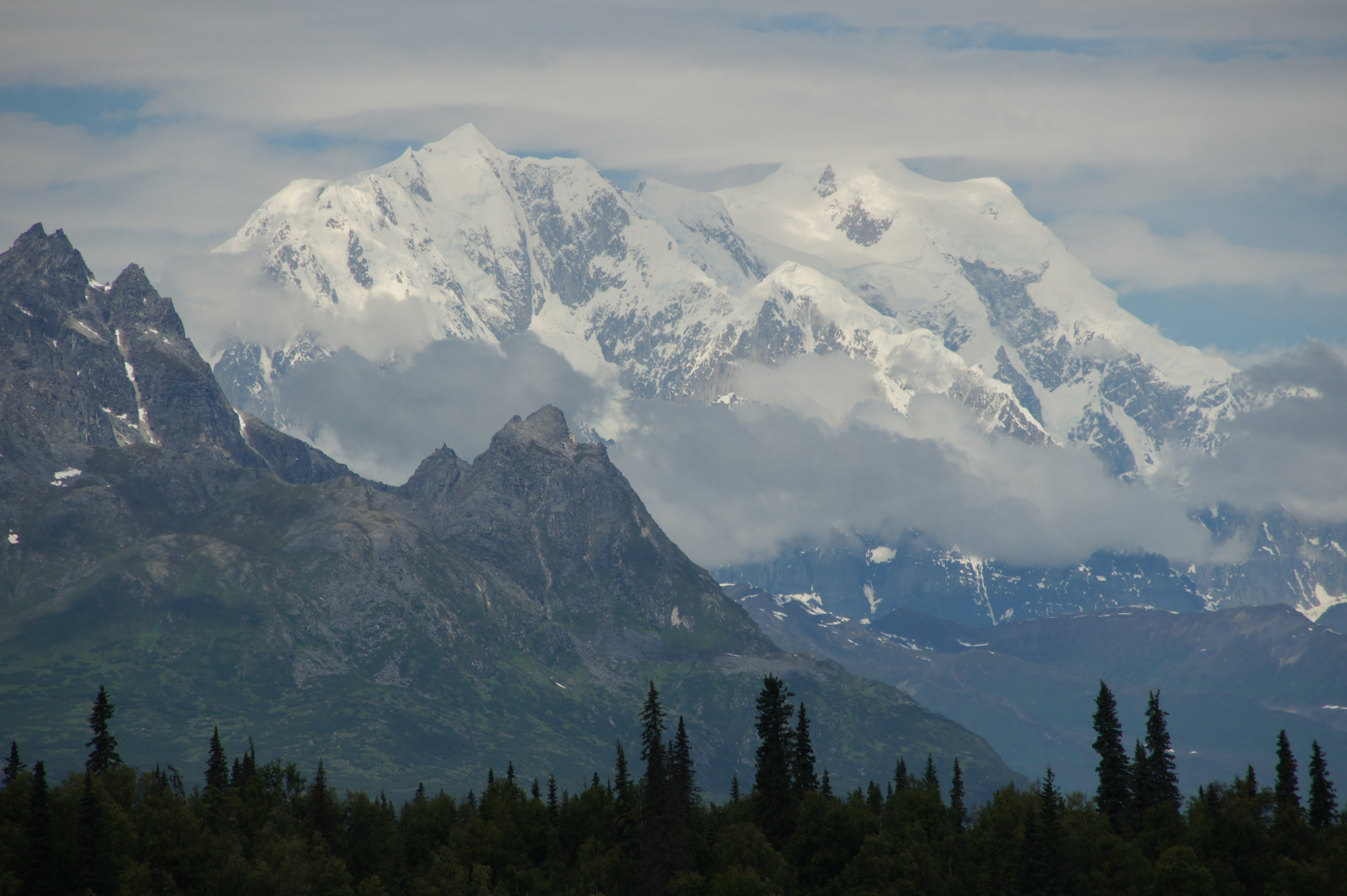
Mount Hunter

Sunrise on Mount Hunter

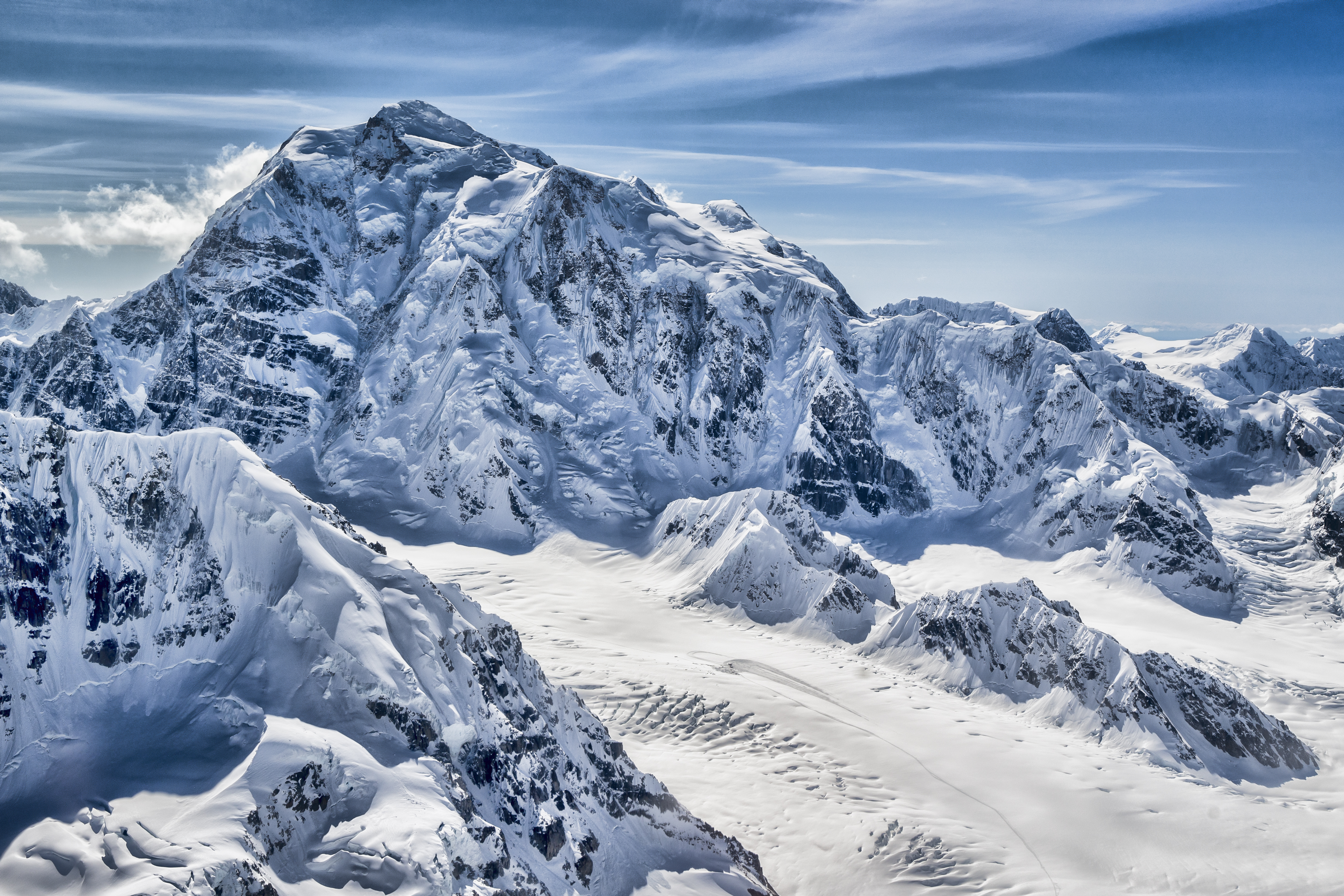
Mount Hunter

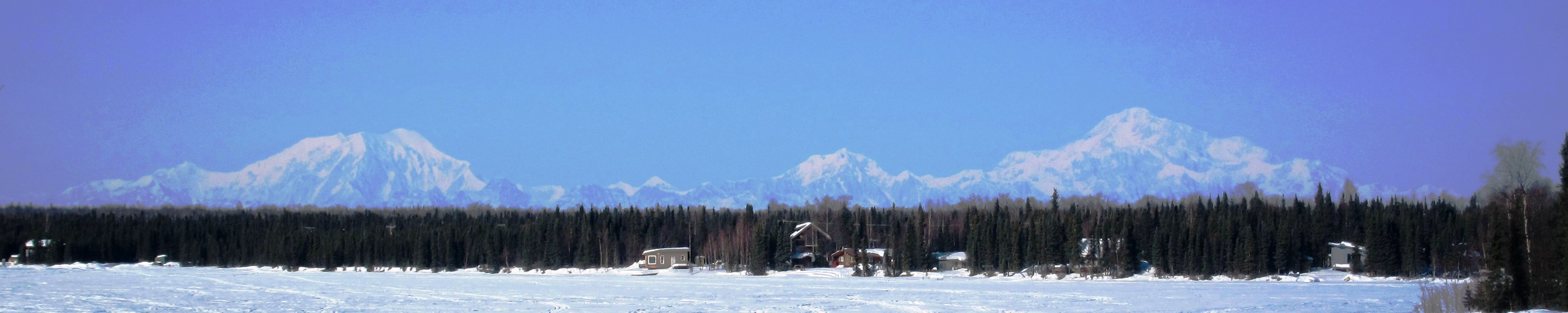
Mount Hunter, nestled between Mount Foraker and Denali

== See also ==
- List of mountain peaks of North America
  - List of mountain peaks of the United States
    - List of mountain peaks of Alaska
- List of the highest major summits of the United States
- List of the most prominent summits of the United States

== Notes ==
1. This is excluding the North Peak and other sub-summits of Denali.
