= Mugs Stump =

American rock climber and mountaineer (1949–1992)

- Born: Terry Stump; August 28, 1949; Mifflintown, Pennsylvania, US
- Died: May 21, 1992 (aged 42); Denali Borough, Alaska, AK
- Occupation: Mountaineer
- Organization(s): United States Antarctic Program, National Science Foundation
- Parent(s): Warren Stump and Florence Manbeck
- Relatives: 3 brothers: Ed, Quig, and Thad

Terry "Mugs" Stump (August 28, 1949 – May 21, 1992) was a noted American rock climber and mountaineer, active in establishing difficult first ascents in the Alaska Range and the Canadian Rockies. He died from falling into a crevasse while descending the South Buttress of Denali on May 21, 1992, while guiding clients Bob Hoffman and Nelson Max.

He is most noted for the first ascent of the Emperor Face on Mount Robson with Jamie Logan, and for three routes in the Alaska Range, the East Face of The Moose's Tooth, the Moonflower Buttress on Mount Hunter, and a one-day solo of Denali's Cassin Ridge.

Climber Conrad Anker credits Stump as an influential climbing mentor in the film Meru.

Stump, along with his geologist brother, contributed to field safety for the United States Antarctic Program scientists and other working on the continent for the National Science Foundation.

The Mugs Stump Alpine Climbing Award for aspiring alpine climbers is named in his honor.

== Early life ==
Mugs was born in Mifflintown, Pennsylvania, where he grew up fishing, hunting, and camping with his father Warren and three brothers.

== First ascents and notable ascents ==
- 1978 Stump/Logan, Emperor Face, Mount Robson (VI 5.9 A2 2500m) with Jamie Logan.
- 1981 Dance of the Woo Li Masters, East Face of The Moose's Tooth, Ruth Gorge, Alaska, US (VI 5.9 WI4+ A4, 1520m) with Jim Bridwell
- 1981 Moonflower Buttress, North Buttress of Mount Hunter, Alaska Range (Alaska Grade 6: 5.8 A3 AI6, 6100') with Paul Aubrey(NZ). FA to ridge crest.
- 1987 South Face Broken Tooth, Ruth Gorge, Alaska Range (IV 5.10+ A3). FA with Steve Quinlan
- 1990 Rodeo Queen, Streaked Wall, Zion National Park, FA with Conrad Anker
- 1991 Freezer Burn aka Free or Burn (IV 5.11+), East Temple, Zion National Park, Utah; FFA with Lynn Wheeler
- 1992 First winter ascent of Hallucinogin Wall, Black Canyon of the Gunnison, with John Middendorf. First Time a major Black Canyon big wall ascended in winter.
