= Ski racing =

Ski racing may refer to:

Winter Olympic sports

- Alpine skiing
- Part of the biathlon
  - Military patrol, the biathlon's predecessor sport
- Cross-country skiing (sport)
- Some of the freestyle skiing events, such as:
  - Mogul skiing, where speed counts for a percentage of the score
  - Ski cross
- Part of the Nordic combined

Other sports

- Randonnée racing
- Speed skiing
- Water ski racing
- Grass skiing
- Skijoring
