= Bolshaya Gorka, Nyuksensky District, Vologda Oblast =

Bolshaya Gorka Большая Горка
- Village
- Location within Vologda Oblast Location within Russia
- Coordinates: 60°14′N 44°04′E
- Country: Russia
- Region: Vologda Oblast
- District: Nyuksensky District
- Time zone: UTC+3:00

Bolshaya Gorka (Russian: Большая Горка) is a rural locality (a village) in Gorodishchenskoye Rural Settlement, Nyuksensky District, Vologda Oblast, Russia. The population was 19 as of 2002.

== Geography ==
Bolshaya Gorka is located 57 km southwest of Nyuksenitsa (the district's administrative centre) by road. Kostinskaya is the nearest rural locality.
