= American Alpine Club =

American mountaineering association

- Formation: 1902
- Purpose: To support our shared passion for climbing and respect for the places we climb.
- Headquarters: Golden, Colorado, U.S.
- Executive Director: Ben Gabriel
- Website: americanalpineclub.org

The American Alpine Club (AAC) is a non-profit member organization with more than 26,000 members. The club is housed in the American Mountaineering Center (AMC) in Golden, Colorado.

Through its members, the AAC advocates for American climbers domestically and around the world; provides grants and volunteer opportunities to protect and conserve climbing areas; hosts local and national climbing festivals and events; cares for the nation's leading climbing library and mountaineering museum; manages the Hueco Rock Ranch, New River Gorge Campground, Samuel F. Pryor III Shawangunk Gateway Campground, Rumney Rattlesnake Campground, and Grand Teton Climbers' Ranch as part of a larger lodging network for climbers; and annually gives about $100,000 toward climbing, conservation, and research grants that fund adventurers who travel the world. It also maintains regional sections—with both regional staff and volunteers—throughout the United States.

The AAC publishes two books, The American Alpine Journal (AAJ) and Accidents in North American Climbing (Accidents) annually. Collections of these journals, along with tens of thousands of other climbing-related publications and mountaineering literature, can be found in the Henry S. Hall Jr. American Alpine Club Library, also located in the AMC. The AAC is a 501(c)(3) organization supported by gifts and grants from individuals, corporations and foundations, member dues, and income from lodging, publications and restricted endowments.

== History ==
Founded by Arctic explorer, zoologist and geographer Angelo Heilprin, the American Alpine Club was established in 1902 and had 45 founding members. These original members were primarily from the East Coast, although a handful resided in the Midwest, Washington, and Alaska. Among them was Annie Smith Peck and the AAC's first president, Charles Ernest Fay, who was also a founding member of the Appalachian Mountain Club.

The club was primarily East Coast-oriented for the first half-century of its existence; its headquarters remained in New York until 1993, when the Board unanimously decided to move the AAC to its current location in Golden, Colorado. The club is housed in the American Mountaineering Center, whose other tenants include the Colorado Mountain Club and Outward Bound.

The AAC is historically and contemporarily associated with a number of other American and international organizations. It was a founding member of the International Climbing and Mountaineering Federation (Union International des Associations d’Alpinism, UIAA) in 1932 and the Arctic Institute of North America in 1948.

== Library ==
The AAC Library was established in 1916 by a gift from American mountaineer Henry Montagnier, whose collection was added to over time by various early club members. The library was initially focused primarily on the Alps. From 1916 until 1929, the library was housed in the New York Public Library, which devoted an entire room to the AAC. During this time, the library grew to include contributions from many members, as well as cultural artifacts from their various expeditions to the Himalayas and elsewhere. In 1941, the AAC purchased a renovated firehouse in Manhattan to house the growing library.

When the AAC moved its permanent headquarters to Golden in 1993, the library, too, moved to its current location in the basement of the American Mountaineering Center, the Henry S. Hall Jr. American Alpine Club Library.

== Publications ==
=== American Alpine Journal ===
First published in 1929, the American Alpine Journal (AAJ) is an annual publication which includes news on groundbreaking first ascents, trip reports from high-altitude ascents the world over, and various resources—including book reviews, maps, and topography.

=== Notable members ===
Another notable founding member is naturalist, prolific writer, and Sierra Club co-founder John Muir, who is considered by many to be the founder of the wilderness preservation movement. Muir also served as the club's second president, and was instrumental in bringing the AAC to a central role in environmental conservation in the United States.

Lyman Spitzer, noted theoretical physicist and astronomer was a member of the club. In 1965, Spitzer and Donald Morton became the first men to climb Mount Thor 1,675 m (5,495 ft), located in Auyuittuq National Park, on Baffin Island, Nunavut, Canada.

Mary Jobe Akeley, who explored the Selkirk Mountains and much of British Columbia between 1907 and 1914, was an early member.

=== Current officers ===
As of 2025, the Board of Directors Executive Committee consists of the following:

President	Nina Williams
Vice President	Keith Thomajan
Secretary	Lori Coyner
Treasurer	Payam Abbassian
