= Mick Burke (mountaineer) =

British mountain climber

Michael Burke
- Died: 26 September 1975 (aged 33–34); Mount Everest
- Occupation: Mountaineer

Michael Burke (1941 – 26 September 1975) was an English mountaineer and climbing cameraman.

Burke developed his own climbing career in the UK and established new routes in the Alps and in the USA. He later trained as a cameraman. Burke came to wider recognition through a number of British-led mountaineering expeditions during the 1960s and 1970s. These included expeditions led by Chris Bonington to Annapurna's South Face in 1970 and an unsuccessful attempt on Mount Everest's south-west face in 1972.

Mick Burke came from Abram, near Wigan, and began his climbing career at age 15 as a member of the Wigan Rambling and Climbing Club, when Jo Moran took him on his first hike up 2000 ft Pendle Hill in Lancashire.

Burke was part of Bonington's 1975 Everest expedition, again to climb the south-west face. Burke's role was primarily as a climber, but he also provided high altitude film coverage for the BBC film crew accompanying the expedition. Following Dougal Haston and Doug Scott's first ascent of the face and successful climb to the summit, Burke was part of a second summit push, from which he did not return. He was last seen alive "heading upwards, a few hundred metres from the summit", but it is not known for sure that he reached the highest point. The weather began to deteriorate rapidly just after he was last seen, and within hours storms had set in which lasted for two days, precluding any rescue attempt by his companions who were themselves marooned in the top camp until the storms abated. His body was never recovered. After his death, Jo Moran said "Mick was never a natural climber. But he succeeded because of his total dedication. His application to the sport was tremendous."

In Burke's memory the BBC created the Mick Burke Award, which was jointly run by the BBC and the Royal Geographical Society. A local charity was also established – the Mick Burke Memorial Trust. The fund intended to promote outdoor pursuits and pioneering activities for young people from the Metropolitan Borough of Wigan and surrounding districts In the years immediately after his death, climbing colleagues helped to raise funds for the Trust, including through the first annual Mick Burke Memorial Illustrated Lecture in October 1977 at Wigan's Queens Hall. The guest speaker was Don Whillans, recounting his expedition with Joe Brown, Hamish Macinnes and Mo Anthoine.

== See also ==
- List of people who died climbing Mount Everest
