= Kelvin Kent (mountaineer) =

British mountain climber

Kelvin Kent is a British adventurer, hiker, mountaineer, businessman and lecturer. He served in the British army for many years, seeing combat in Borneo and working with the Gurkhas of Nepal, before moving to the United States in 1976. Previously he had been a member of two mountaineering expeditions organized by Chris Bonington, to the south face of Annapurna in 1970 and the south-west face of Mount Everest in 1972. The Annapurna expedition, on which Kent served as base camp commander, successfully put Dougal Haston and Don Whillans on the summit, but Kent's friend Ian Clough was killed by a falling ice-pillar on the descent. In 1999 Kent established a commemorative plaque in Clough's memory at the site.

Kent is author of a book of hikes in the Silverton, Colorado area. He is also author of a book of hikes in the Ouray, Colorado area.
