= Harold Drasdo =

English rock climber, writer, and educationalist

Harold Drasdo (21 February 1930 – 3 September 2015) was an English rock climber, writer and educationalist.

== Early life ==
Drasdo was born in Bradford, Yorkshire, England. He began rock climbing just after World War II and became a founding member of a loose association of young climbers from the area who came to be known as "the Bradford Lads". Active throughout the United Kingdom, particularly the gritstone edges of Yorkshire and Derbyshire, the fells of the English Lake District, and the mountains of North Wales.

== Climbing career ==
Harold climbed regularly in the late 1940s and 1950s with most of the leading northern rock climbers of the day including Joe Brown and members of the famous Rock and Ice Club. Another regular partner throughout his active career was his brother, Neville Drasdo, who became a formidable climber during this period in his own right and whose activities included an ascent with Joe Brown of one of the hardest British routes of its day, "Hardd" (now graded E2 5c) on Carreg Hyll Drem in Snowdonia.

Harold and Neville Drasdo were the first climbers to explore Poisoned Glen in Donegal, Ireland, and during an intensive period established several hard first ascents. In 2000, the Drasdo brothers celebrated 50 years of new routing, a half-century that began with "Cravat" (graded VS 4c) on Neckband Crag, Langdale, in 1950 and culminated with "Two Against Nature" (graded S 4a) on Craig Ddu, Moel Siabod.

== Climbing author ==
As a guidebook writer, Harold Drasdo wrote the first Fell & Rock Climbing Club guide to the Eastern crags of the Lake District in 1957. In 1971 he became the first climber to write both English and Welsh guidebooks when he wrote the Climbers' Club guide to Lliwedd. As a consistent explorer of undeveloped crags in England, Wales and Ireland, he has established many first ascents, including North Crag Eliminate (E1 5b) on Castle Rock of Triermain, Grendal (VS 4b) in Deepdale, Anarchist (HS 4b) on Raven Crag, Ulysses (VS) in Donegal, Automedon (VS 4c) and Heart of Darkness (VS 4c) on Arenig Fawr, and Traditional Route (S) on Craig Rhaeadr Ewynnol.

== Educational instructor ==
Harold was an outdoor education instructor who worked in Derbyshire and North Wales which culminated with a twenty-year period as Chief Instructor of the Towers Outdoor Education Centre, Capel Curig, North Wales. Apart from his guidebooks, he published Education and The outdoor Centres (1972); The Mountain Spirit (1979); and his autobiography, The Ordinary Route (1997). A frequent essayist and reviewer, Harold's published works are included in journals and magazines.

== Personal life ==
Politically he has been a lifelong anarchist and environmentalist who has frequently defended the natural environment in both actions and print. Harold lived in North Wales and still active in mountain activities.

Harold Drasdo died after a short illness, in Bangor, North Wales on 3 September 2015.
