= 1975 British Mount Everest Southwest Face expedition =

Himalayan ascent requiring rock climbing techniques

Coordinates: 27°58′48″N 86°54′36″E

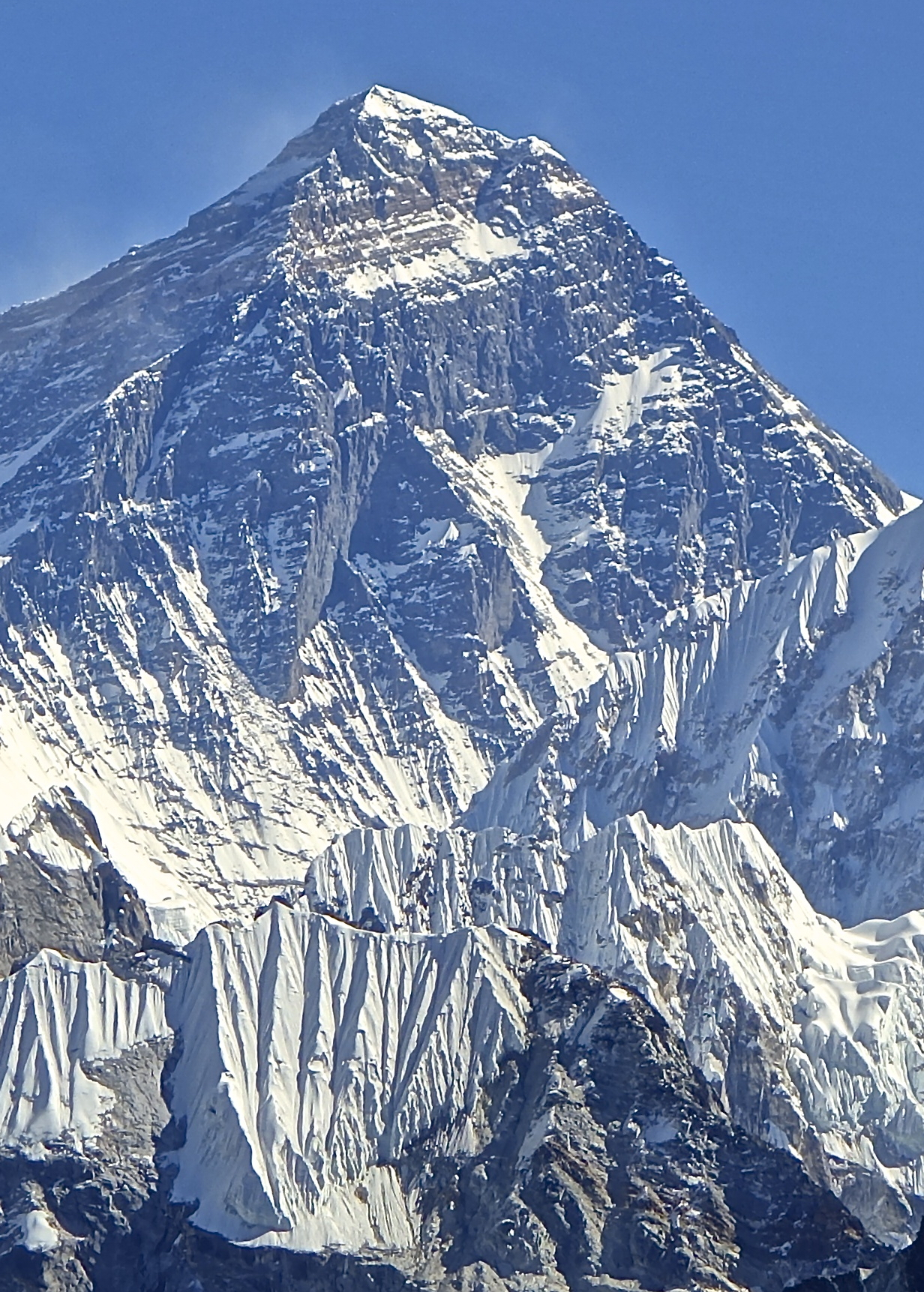
Mount Everest's Southwest Face. Nuptse obscures the view at the lower right. (Note: This photo was taken in November 2012 but photographs are available online showing the rather similar snow conditions during the 1975 expedition.)

The 1975 British Mount Everest Southwest Face expedition was the first to successfully climb Mount Everest by ascending one of its faces rather than along its ridges. In the post-monsoon season Chris Bonington led the expedition that used rock climbing techniques to put fixed ropes up the face from the Western Cwm to just below the South Summit. A key aspect of the success of the climb was the scaling of the cliffs of the Rock Band at about 8,200 metres (27,000 ft) by Nick Estcourt and Tut Braithwaite.

Two teams then climbed to the South Summit and followed the Southeast Ridge to the main summit – Dougal Haston with Doug Scott on 24 September 1975, who at the South Summit made the highest ever bivouac for that time, and Peter Boardman with Pertemba two days later. It is thought that Mick Burke fell to his death shortly after he had also reached the top.

British climbers reached the summit of Everest for the first time in an event that has been described as "the apotheosis of the big, military-style expeditions". Bonington's route was climbed alpine style over a decade later in the 1988 Czechoslovak - New Zealand Mount Everest Southwest Face Expedition.

== Background ==
=== Rock climbing in Britain after World War II ===
After years of stagnation between the wars, British rock climbing underwent a renaissance, particularly with working-class climbing clubs starting up in the north of England and Scotland. The Rock and Ice Club in Manchester, the Creagh Dhu Mountaineering Club in Glasgow and several university climbing clubs were amongst those that engendered a highly competitive climbing environment. At Clogwyn Du'r Arddu in Wales numerous routes of a very high standard were achieved using strictly free climbing techniques. Hamish MacInnes and Dougal Haston, although not members, climbed with Creagh Dhu. MacInnes had mentored Bonington's youthful climbing as early as 1953. These associations led on to spectacular exploits such as the American-led direttissima route up the North Face of the Eiger in the winter of 1966 (including Haston (Note: On the Eiger climb Bonington and Burke were climbing journalist and cameraman.)) and the televised climbing of the Old Man of Hoy in Orkney in the following year (including Bonington and Haston (Note: On the Old Man of Hoy climb MacInnes was climbing cameraman.)). The public took notice and commercial sponsorship started to become a possibility for even more elaborate expeditions but with an ultimate aim of rock climbing. With all the 8000-metre peaks climbed by 1964, climbing in the Himalayas using rock climbing routes became an aspiration.

=== Bonington's path to Everest ===
Bonington's climbing career began when he was still in his teens and he was soon achieving technically difficult ascents in the Alps with several first ascents and, in 1962, the first ascent by a Briton of the Eiger's Nordwand. He made first ascents of Annapurna II (1960) and Nuptse (1962). His role as climbing photo-journalist on the "Eiger direttissima" in 1966 attracted attention and he was encouraged to mount his own expedition.

Bonington conceived of the idea of climbing Annapurna by its South Face which he realised was going to require siege tactics as well as rock climbing. What was to become the 1970 British Annapurna South Face expedition involved Haston as well as such climbers as Don Whillans, Mick Burke, Nick Estcourt, Martin Boysen and Ian Clough (Clough was killed during the descent). The expedition was a success because not only was the summit reached but it was, for its time, the most difficult technical climb to the summit of a major world peak. Bonington had been the leader and had not personally attempted to reach the summit. He was a good communicator and he had been able to attract sponsorship and maintain a group of proficient yet individualistic climbers as a coherent team.

Seizing an opportunity for an Everest expedition post-monsoon in 1972, Bonington originally planned a lightweight expedition by the normal route but the failure of a European pre-monsoon Southwest Face expedition earlier in that year encouraged him to attempt the Southwest Face instead. In very poor weather Bonington's expedition failed to reach the summit but the team gained a great deal of experience, in particular discovering that the line they had chosen above Camp 6 was not as favourable as they had anticipated.

Bonington decided not to make any further post-monsoon attempts but the next suitable slot was a long way in the future so, after learning that a British Army team was planning a pre-monsoon 1976 expedition, Bonington tried to persuade them to allow his team to be included. However, his suggestion was rejected.

=== Climbing on Everest prior to 1975 ===
==== Routes climbed ====
After the 1921 British reconnaissance, attempts to climb Everest had been from Tibet because Nepal was closed to foreign climbers. Then, in 1950, Tibet's borders were closed when it was occupied by the People's Republic of China and by that time no expedition had been able to reach the summit. Partly on account of the political situation in Tibet, Nepal started allowing climbers entry in 1950 although it closed its frontiers again in 1966. During the period 1950–1966 three ridge routes were pioneered to reach the summit – the South Col—Southeast Ridge (1953 expedition), West Ridge—Hornbein Couloir (1963 expedition) and by a Chinese team via the North Col—Northeast Ridge (1960 expedition). However, no summit attempt had been made on routes up any of Everest's faces. (Note: If a mountain is likened to a pyramid, a face is a triangular relatively flat part and an edge is the sharp part where two faces join. Often it is easier to climb an edge rather than a face.) Nepal again allowed entry to climbers in 1969 and the Southwest Face, the only face accessible from Nepal, was such an attractive objective that Japan immediately mounted a spring reconnaissance in that year and returned in the autumn with a larger party with several climbers reaching 8,000 metres (26,000 ft) on a line striking left from the central gully (black—cyan route on the diagram below).

==== Previous summit attempts using the Southwest Face ====
The climbing routes of the 1969–1973 expeditions (colours described in text)

Spring 1970 Japanese expedition – the expedition climbed no higher than in the previous year (black—cyan route on the diagram). However, led by Saburo Matsukata, a party reached the summit via the South Col.

Spring 1971 International expedition – led by Norman Dyhrenfurth, the expedition reached 8,350 metres (27,400 ft) (attained by Haston and Whillans) on a new line leading to the right above Camp 5 (black—blue—brown route).

Spring 1972 European expedition – Felix Kuen and Adolf Huber reached about 8,300 metres (27,200 ft) in an expedition led by Karl Herrligkoffer (black—blue—green route).

Autumn 1972 British expedition – on the Bonington-led expedition 8,300 metres (27,200 ft) was reached by Bonington, Ang Phu, MacInnes, Scott, Burke and Haston (black—blue route).

Autumn 1973 Japanese expedition – 8,300 metres (27,200 ft) was reached on the Southwest Face (black—blue route) but the expedition did reach the summit by the South Col. The expedition was led by Michio Yuasa and it was the first time Everest had been climbed after the monsoon.

== Genesis of the 1975 expedition ==
The post-monsoon Japanese expedition in autumn 1973 had attempted both the Southwest Face and the normal route. The face party had failed in much the same way as the British had the year before but the South Col team had managed what turned out to be a very significant achievement. In the post-monsoon season they had reached the summit by climbing directly from the South Col without stopping overnight. By the time they had reached the summit they were out of oxygen but despite that, and having to bivouac overnight without food, drink or a tent, they had returned safely to the South Col.

In December 1973 Bonington heard that a team had withdrawn from its 1975 time slot. It was for post-monsoon so when he applied for the slot he was again intending to attempt his lightweight South Col—Southeast Ridge scheme. Permission was given in April 1974 when he, Haston and Scott were starting on a Changabang expedition (which was to be another first ascent) and Haston and Scott were able to persuade Bonington to try the Southwest Face again, despite it having to be in the autumn. The scheme eventually turned into what has been described as "the apotheosis of the big, military-style expeditions".

== Preparations ==
A lesson learned from the 1973 Japanese expedition (and the 1952 Swiss expedition) was that any attempt should be as early as possible after the monsoon was over and this meant the trek from Kathmandu to Base Camp had to be during the monsoon. Another attempt using the "Whillans Chimney" above Camp 6 would have meant establishing a seventh camp and so a route to the left of the Great Central Gully would be taken on the same line that the earliest Japanese climbers had tried. Camp 6 would be established on the upper snowfield and a long traverse would be taken to the Southeast Ridge. To complete the traverse, climb the ridge, and return would be a very long day – a bivouac on the return might well be necessary. To get into a position to do this a large support team would need to make a rapid ascent up the central gully so very careful logistical planning would be necessary. Supplementary oxygen would be used above Camp 4 for climbers and Camp 5 for sherpas. 4,000 metres (13,000 ft) of fixed rope would be used up the face (fixed rope in the Icefall and climbing rope would be additional).

A management committee, chaired by Lord Hunt (John Hunt of the 1953 British Mount Everest expedition), was set up for what would be an expensive, siege-style operation. Peter Boardman was later to remark "for a mountaineer, surely a Bonington Everest expedition is one of the last great Imperial experiences life can offer." Bonington and his agent knew a director of Barclays Bank International and they approached him to see if the bank would provide sponsorship. Barclays not only agreed to provide the £100,000 requested but agreed to cover any overspend. This caused complaints from customers of the bank and a question was asked in Parliament.

In an era before personal computers, meticulous logistical planning was done on a mainframe computer owned by Ian McNaught Davis's computer firm and programmed by a professional programmer.

=== Expedition team ===
The team was based on the climbers in the 1970 Annapurna and 1972 Southwest Face expeditions. Hamish MacInnes was to be deputy leader and Dougal Haston, Doug Scott, Mick Burke, Nick Estcourt, Mike Thompson and Martin Boysen agreed to take part. All except the last two had Southwest Face experience. People joining the team for the first time were Peter Boardman, Paul ("Tut") Braithwaite, Ronnie Richards, Dave Clarke, Allen Fyffe and Mike Rhodes. Rhodes was a Barclays employee, nominated by the bank. The doctors, both experienced mountaineers, were Charles Clarke and Jim Duff. Camp managers were Adrian Gordon and Mike Cheney who both spoke Nepali. There was to be a team of thirty-three climbing sherpas with Pertemba as sirdar and Ang Phu as deputy. Twenty-six porters for the Khumbu Icefall were led by their sirdar Phurkipa. There were further sherpas for general duties.

In addition there was a Sunday Times reporter and four people from the BBC to make a television documentary, all with their accompanying sherpas. A team of drivers was needed for transport to Kathmandu.

=== Equipment ===
24 tonnes of equipment left Britain in over 1000 crates and needed to pass through 22 customs posts. Relatively little climbing gear was needed because the climb would be largely non-technical and oxygen cylinders, climbing rope and lightweight ladders were the major requirements. Deadmen (anchors for embedding in snow) turned out to be especially useful in the conditions encountered. Eleven tonnes of food was taken and a greater quantity was procured in Nepal. Meals of different menus were wrapped identically to avoid the risk of favourite meals being selected out before they could be carried high on the mountain. Face boxes (box-like tents) were needed because there are no sizeable ledges on the steep face. The face boxes used in 1973 had been found to be not strong enough to resist falling rocks and ice, so for this expedition MacInnes designed strengthened boxes with roofs of bulletproof mesh for the lower camps on the face and small-size "assault boxes" for Camp 6. The two-man assault boxes were 1.07 by 1.12 by 1.91 metres. (Note: Assault box size: 3 ft 6 in × 3 ft 8 in × 6 ft 3 in.)

== The expedition ==
Two 16-tonne trucks, driven by Bob Stoodley (transport manager for the team) and three other drivers, left London on 9 April 1975 and the gear was driven to Kathmandu from where it was flown to Lukla Airstrip and then carried by porters to Khunde, near Namche Bazaar, where it arrived for storage on 10 June, before the monsoon.

Approach march, Kathmandu to Base Camp

=== Trek from Kathmandu to Base Camp ===
Later stages of the approach march

The main team flew from London to Kathmandu from where in early August they travelled by road to Lamosanghu (near Pagretar). (Note: This road is now the Araniko Highway and it carries on further north to cross into China at the Sino-Nepal Friendship Bridge at Kodari.) From there on they travelled as two parties trekking separately. Despite the trek taking place during the monsoon, in the mornings the weather was fine but with afternoon rain. Estcourt and Haston went ahead to prepare a route on the Icefall. (Note: The route is still used for trekking – although there is now a road that penetrates as far to the east as Jiri it does not reach all the way to Khumbu.) Bonington's party reached Khunde on 14 August after a two-week trek and at Thyangboche they met the lama to receive his blessing.

Taking about three days, hundreds of locally hired porters carried 24 tonnes of equipment and 12 tonnes of food from Khunde to Base Camp arriving by 23 August. It was at this stage that one of the porters went missing. He was a young boy who had been on the 1972 expedition and who Doug Scott in particular had taken under his wing. A search party found him dead in a stream just below Base Camp.

=== Khumbu Icefall and Western Cwm ===
About sixty sherpas ferried supplies through the Icefall and up to the Southwest Face. It was necessary to prepare a route through shifting crevasses and seracs for the part of the climb that posed the greatest threat. Scott and Haston reached the top of the Icefall on 26 August and identified a place for Camp 1 at the foot of the Western Cwm at a place where surrounding crevasses would swallow up any avalanches.

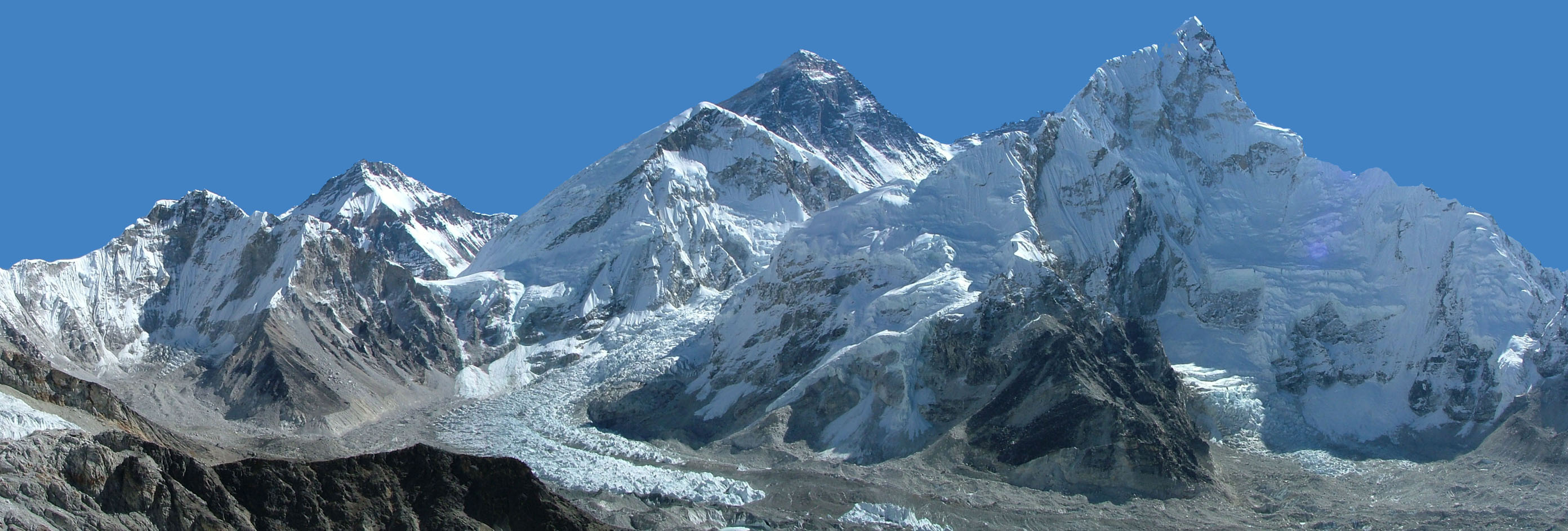
Icefall (centre) and Glacier descending from the Western Cwm, hidden behind Nuptse (right). Everest's summit and Southwest Face are above the cwm. Between and below the summit of Everest and the South Summit lies the upper snowfield with the vertical cliffs of the Rock Band beneath it. (October 2005.)

Camp 1 was established on 28 August in a much shorter time than had been managed in 1972. Each afternoon avalanches swept down the flanks of Everest and Nuptse as the temperature rose sharply after the cold nights. It took three days for Haston and Scott to prospect a route to a suitable site for Camp 2 at the head of the Western Cwm. As he had done in the Icefall, MacInnes took the lead in building ladder bridges for the sherpas following.

The plan was to attempt the route originally taken by the Japanese 1969 expedition, crossing the Rock Band via a deep gully to the left. Camps 4 and 5 would be sited at lower heights than tried previously so as to be more sheltered.

=== Ascent of Southwest Face ===
The climbing route of the 1975 expedition. The upper part of the route without fixed ropes is dotted red and the route proposed by Haston and Scott is dashed red.

From Camp 2, Haston and Scott suggested a more direct climbing line up to the site of Camp 5 but in the end they agreed to stick to the previous plan since it was more sheltered from avalanches. A week was spent establishing Camp 2. Scott and Burke started climbing the Southwest Face on 6 September, setting fixed rope to be used subsequently, and ascending 370 metres (1,200 ft) to the foot of a buttress at the place selected for Camp 3. Estcourt and Braithwaite followed next day, climbing beyond Camp 3 and taking two days fixing rope over difficult powder snow. Another two days allowed them to establish Camp 4 at 7,200 metres (23,700 ft) and fix rope beyond towards the Great Central Gully. Boysen and Boardman, and subsequently Haston, MacInnes and Bonington arrived to hack away platforms for camps suitable for sherpas and equipment high on the face. MacInnes was struck by an avalanche and, although he was not directly injured, ice crystals filled his lungs and he had to be helped to descend the face. Boardman, Haston and Boysen climbed to find a site for Camp 5.

On 18 September eight sherpas arrived at Camp 4 to carry more equipment up to Camp 5 and next day Bonington and Haston reconnoitred up towards the gully through the Rock Band. Then, on a radio call from Camp 5 Bonington announced that Haston and Scott would be the pair to make the first summit attempt. It would take Haston two days to ascend from the foot of the face during which time Estcourt and Braithwaite would attempt to set fixed ropes up the gully.

=== Climbing the Rock Band ===
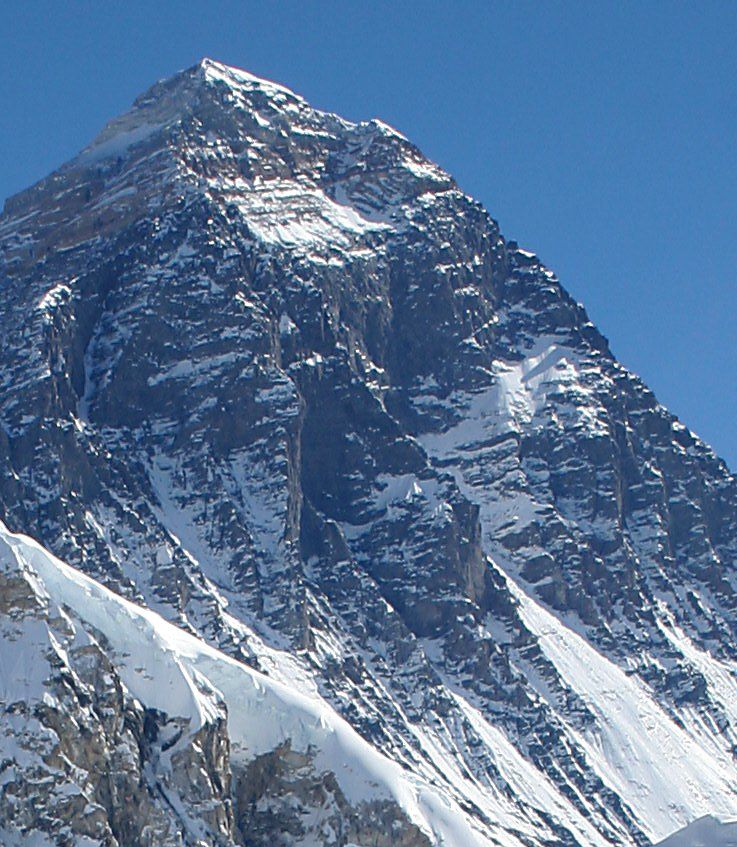
Upper Southwest Face. Between and below the summit of Everest and the South Summit lies the upper snowfield with the vertical cliffs of the Rock Band beneath it. The Great Central Gully is hidden until it descends to the lower right. (Note: Photographs are available online showing the rather similar snow conditions during the expedition.)

Early in the morning of 20 September, Estcourt and Braithwaite left Camp 5 to take alternating leads up the Rock Band. Bonington and Burke waited until the sherpas brought more rope and then set off carrying up the rope that would be fixed in place ahead. They were climbing at 8,200 metres (27,000 ft), weighed down with oxygen cylinders, towards the gully with very few places that would take pitons but eventually they reached a snow patch suitable for a deadman anchor. Here the gully proper started and the risk of avalanches increased. After a few changes of lead Braithwaite spotted a ramp (Note: A "ramp" in climbing is an ascending ledge across a rock face that may, as in this case, have a footing sloping away from the face and have little by way of hand or foot holds.) to the right but as he headed towards it his oxygen ran out and he almost passed out. A fall would have killed him. After removing his mask he reached a place where he could drive his ice-axe deeply into snow and belay the other three climbers up to him.

Estcourt led on up the ramp to a comparatively safe stance where his oxygen ran out. He headed on where there were very slight holds and where the only piton placement was not at all solid. At last he reached a crack that could be used for a firm piton. This pitch was possibly the hardest ever done at such an altitude. Estcourt described the climb as "Scottish Grade III" although that disregarded the difficulty of any climb at 8,200 metres (27,000 ft). (Note: Scottish Grade III is similar to Alpine AD and has been described as "More sustained and steeper routes, generally following gullies or buttress (ridge) lines. Two axes required to overcome short, steep technical sections of ice or rock.") The two lead climbers continued up to the upper snowfield while the two in support left their rope burdens and went down to Camp 5. The Rock Band had been crossed in a single day.

=== Summit attempts ===
Progress had been so good that Bonington saw an opportunity to have three parties attempt the summit on successive days and he announced his selections on 21 September. The first would be Scott and Haston (as had been widely expected); the second would be Burke, Boardman, Boysen and Pertemba; and the third Braithwaite, Estcourt, Ang Phurba and Bonington himself. Bonington had previously promised Estcourt and Braithwaite they would be in any second party but he decided they might be weak right after their Rock Band exertions so he told them to return briefly to Camp 2 and then return to join the third party. They accepted this with good grace. Pertemba had been told he could select a sherpa for each of the two later attempts. Burke had been climbing slowly but Bonington considered that this could have been due to the weight of camera equipment and he realised the value of having filming high up on the mountain. MacInnes would have been a strong contender but Bonington was beginning to favour a younger person (Boardman) and MacInnes had still not recovered from the avalanche. MacInnes, upset, said he would leave the expedition but he would tell the press it was solely due to his health. Privately Clarke, the team doctor, advised Bonington that he should not include himself in the summit attempts since that would mean he would be above 7,800 metres (25,500 ft) for far too long. Reluctantly Bonington accepted this and gave his place to Richards.

==== Haston and Scott ====
Haston, Scott and Ang Phurba left Camp 5 next morning, followed slightly later by six climbers (including Bonington) and sherpas in support. Scott was impressed by the difficulty of the climb up the gully and he went on to lead while laying 76 metres (250 ft) more rope to the upper snowfield, the site for Camp 6. After a rest at the camp the support climbers returned to Camp 5 leaving Haston and Scott to hack out space for their assault box. The following day they fixed a full 500 metres (1,600 ft) of rope and returned to their "tent". After waking at 01:00 they left at 03:30 next morning, in the dark, setting off up their fixed ropes. Expecting they would have to bivouac on their round-trip to the summit, they took a tent sack (but no tent or sleeping bags), a stove for melting snow and two oxygen cylinders each. Three 50-metre (160 ft) ropes were taken for difficult sections.

Using binoculars, the main party at Camp 2 were just able to see the two climbers on the upper snowfield before they disappeared into a couloir leading up to the South Summit. They were then briefly spotted at the top of the couloir at 16:00, much later than expected, still moving upwards before it got dark. As dawn broke the next day they could be seen moving back to Camp 6. By this time the second party had already set off from Camp 5, not knowing whether the first party had reached the summit and whether they would have to perform a rescue mission.

At dawn Scott and Haston had been above the fixed ropes and starting to climb the couloir to the South Summit when Haston's oxygen equipment failed. It had become blocked with ice but to clear the tube took over an hour. They fixed one of their ropes on a difficult section of the gully and continued, alternating the lead. Eventually they reached the ridge at 15:00 and were able to see across Tibet and over to Kangchenjunga. They had succeeded in climbing the Southwest Face but the aim was also to reach the top of Everest along the Southeast Ridge. They wondered whether to bivouac and so they started digging out snow from a cave just below them but then they decided the lying snow was probably in better condition than it would be in the morning. So they set off up the Southeast Ridge, Haston led up the Hillary Step, and the pair reached the summit together as the sun was starting to set, at 18:00, 24 September 1975. (Note: Some of Scott's photographs are accessible online.)

In gathering darkness they descended, abseiling down the Hillary Step, but by the South Summit, clouds were covering the sky and lightning was flickering so they prepared for the highest bivouac ever undertaken at that time. They dug out the cave further and settled for a cold night (Scott estimated −50 °C) without oxygen or heating fuel, rubbing each other to try ward off the cold. To save weight Scott had left his down suit at the lower camp. Although partly hallucinating they knew they could not survive if they fell asleep. At first light they headed on down, reaching Camp 6 at 09:00 and radioing down their news. They had survived without getting frostbite. At the time the Guardian described it as being like "spending the night in a sheet sleeping-bag in a deep freeze, with the oxygen cut by two-thirds". As well as being the first people to summit Everest by the Southwest Face, they were also the first Britons to reach the summit by any route. (Note: Twenty-two years earlier the British press had treated Hillary and even Tenzing as if they were British. In the News Chronicle's front page story on 2 June 1953 the first paragraph was "Glorious Coronation Day news! Everest – Everest the unconquerable – has been conquered. And conquered by men of British blood and breed".) For the time, it had been the fastest ever ascent of Everest, 33 days. (Note: 33 days measured from leaving Base Camp to reaching the summit. In 1979 this time was improved by a Swabian (Germany) team on the South Col route.) The second summit team arrived at Camp 6 to find them safe and well and by afternoon Haston and Scott had jumared down to Camp 2.

==== Boardman, Boysen, Burke and Pertemba ====
Moving up to Camp 6 Burke had been climbing slowly and was very late in arriving. He was weighed down because he was working as a cameraman for the BBC and his filming was very important for him as well as for the whole team. Bonington told Boysen that Burke should stay at Camp 6 next day but when Burke eventually arrived he was able to persuade Bonington to let him continue. The following morning all four started the ascent but Boysen's oxygen set soon failed and he lost a crampon and so had to return to the camp. Boardman and Pertemba climbed strongly with Burke lagging far behind. The pair had reached the South Summit by 11:00 where Pertemba's oxygen blocked in the same way as had Haston's. They reached the summit of Everest at just after 13:00 on 26 September. There was poor visibility in the wind-driven mist.

The weather deteriorated further as Boardman and Pertemba descended and the visibility was getting worse. To their astonishment they encountered Burke, sitting in the snow, only a few hundred metres from the summit and above the Hillary Step. They had been assuming he had rejoined Boysen at camp 6. He asked them to return to the summit for him to photograph them but, seeing their reluctance, said he would go by himself to take some photographs and do some filming from the top. After agreeing to wait for him at the South Summit they separated. After a wait of over 1 1/2 hours in blizzard conditions it was getting dark so at 16:30 the pair started to descend the couloir in the storm. They still had oxygen and they were fortunate to find the end of the fixed ropes in the dark. At 19:30 they only just managed to rejoin Boysen at Camp 6 with Boardman needing to half-drag Pertemba over the final distance. Mick Burke did not return. Boardman had frostbite in his feet, Pertemba was snowblind and Boysen got frostbitten hands clearing snow for the 30 hours they were trapped at Camp 6 by the storm.

=== Clearing the mountain ===
The storm had passed by 28 September and the third summit team were still at Camp 5. However, with powder avalanches coming down the face and with no hope of finding Burke, the expedition was called off. Those at Camp 5 waited for Boysen, Boardman and Pertemba and then accompanied them down to Camp 2 on the Western Cwm where they were interviewed by the BBC. Two days earlier Camp 1 had been evacuated as it began to slide down the Icefall and on 27 September the people at Camp 4 had been ordered down because it was threatened by the huge amount of snow higher up the face. During the evacuation, Gordon had become stranded in the dark and a rescue needed to be mounted – Bonington with a rescue party located him and managed to return with him to Camp 2 at midnight. Later that night an avalanche devastated the entire camp and, though no one was injured, the camp had to be abandoned. The expedition was back to Base Camp by 30 September, to Kathmandu by 11 October, and to London on 17 October.

== Subsequent events ==
Mick Burke's body has not been found (Note: Not found as of September 2025.) but it is thought likely he did reach the summit.

The expedition considerably exceeded its planned expenditure – £130,000 rather than £100,000. Barclays, the sponsors, owned several media rights including those to the book Bonington was to publish, Everest the Hard Way, which became a best-seller and so the bank was able to recover its entire expenditure. The BBC produced a documentary film of the same name. (Note: The BBC documentary was produced by Ned Kelly and Chris Ralling and was narrated by John Castle.) With the publicity given to the expedition, Bonington, Haston and Scott became household names in Britain. Bonington was made a CBE and later went on to receive a knighthood.

Two years later Scott was proposing a lightweight expedition to The Ogre in the Karakoram that was to include Bonington (as a team member) and Haston. While it was being planned, news came through that Haston had been killed in an avalanche while skiing in the Alps. The expedition went ahead and in fact Scott and Bonington became the first people to reach the summit. Estcourt was killed on the 1978 Bonington-led K2 West Ridge expedition. Boardman died together with Joe Tasker on Bonington's 1982 Everest Northeast Ridge expedition.

Pertemba founded his trekking agency in 1985 and also later that year teamed up again with Bonington on a Norwegian-led expedition that led to Bonington reaching the summit of Everest for his first and only time.

The Southwest Face was climbed by a Slovak expedition in 1988 when four climbers reached the South Summit in alpine style with no supplementary oxygen. Jozef Just went on to reach the main summit on 17 October but on the descent his team all disappeared in a strong storm after their last radio contact with the base saying they were on the way to the South Col. Their bodies were never found. A South Korean expedition climbed the route in 1995. However, on either side of the face (and so possibly to be included in its scope) are the South Pillar and Central Pillar (Note: The South Pillar is also called the South Buttress and the Central Pillar is also called the Southwest Pillar.) and these have been successfully used as climbing routes several times starting in 1980 and 1982 for the two routes respectively. In 1980 there was an ascent of Everest by a full North Face route; a Kangshung Face route was achieved in 1983.

Forty years after the ascent ten of the expedition's members took part in a reunion meeting at the Royal Geographical Society in London, raising funds for Community Action Nepal.

== See also ==
- List of Mount Everest expeditions
