= 1970 British Annapurna South Face expedition =

First ascent of Himalayan mountain face using rock climbing techniques

Coordinates: 28°35′43″N 83°49′32″E

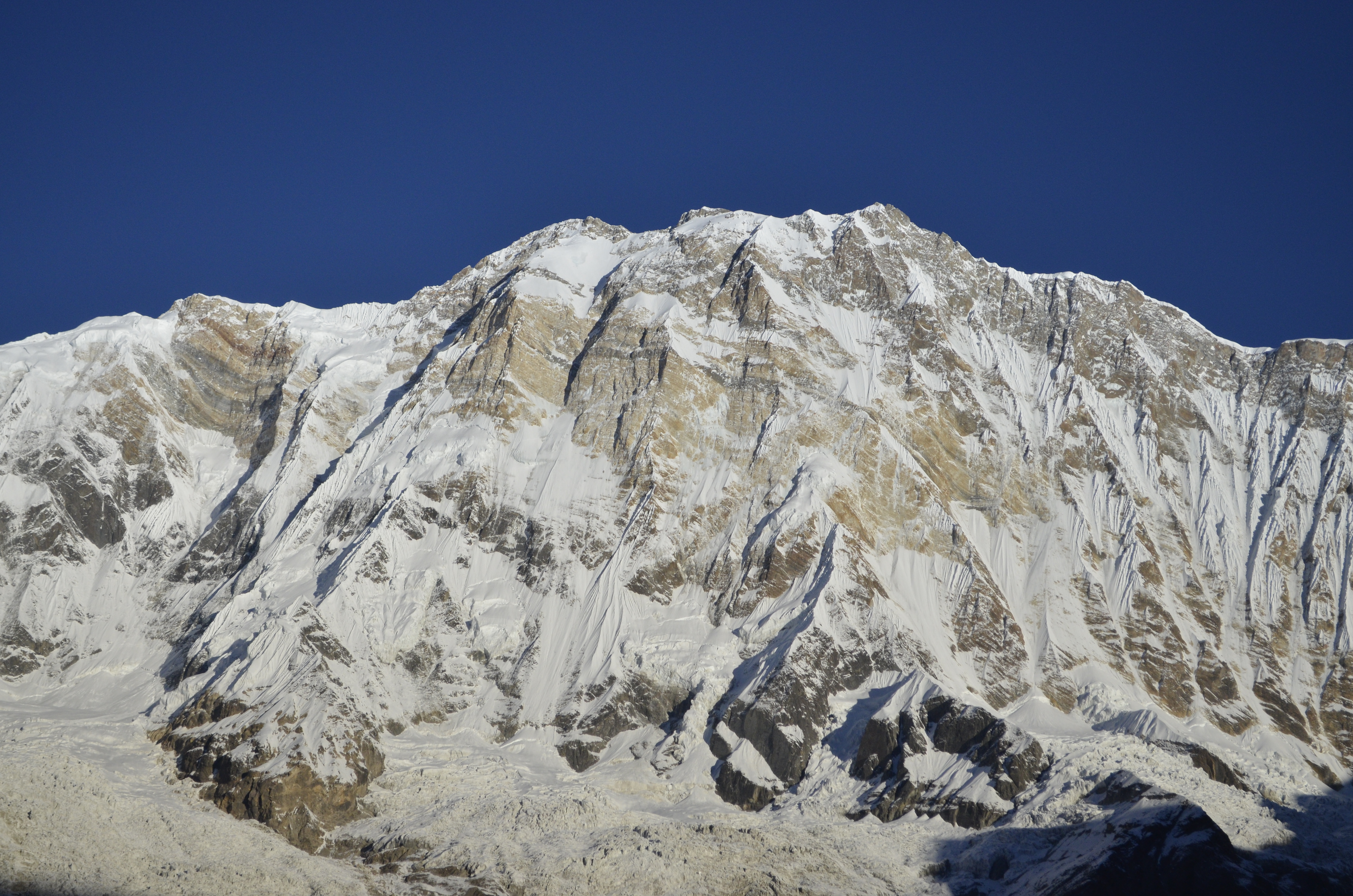
Annapurna South Face from Base Camp (2013)

The 1970 British Annapurna South Face expedition was a Himalayan climb that was the first to take a deliberately difficult route up the face of an 8,000-metre peak. At the time that the expedition set out, in March 1970, the only 8000ers which had been ascended more than once were Everest, Cho Oyu and Nanga Parbat; only Everest and Nanga Parbat had been climbed by a route different from that used on the first ascent.

On 27 May 1970 Don Whillans and Dougal Haston reached the summit of Annapurna I, which at 26,545 feet (8,091 m) is the highest peak in the Annapurna Massif in Nepal. Chris Bonington led the expedition, which approached up a glacier from the Annapurna Sanctuary and then used rock climbing techniques to put fixed ropes up the steep South Face. Although the plan had been to use supplementary oxygen, in the event it was not possible to carry any cylinders high enough for the lead climbers to use on their summit bid.

Lower down on the mountain, on 30 May, as the expedition was about to leave, Ian Clough was killed by a falling serac. Several members of the expedition rose to fame in Britain, and as a whole the expedition received international recognition in mountaineering circles on account of its innovative and extremely difficult nature.

== Background ==
=== Annapurna ===
The Annapurna massif is in the Eastern Himalaya region of Nepal, where for over one hundred years the ruling Rana dynasty had not allowed explorers or mountaineers to enter the country. In 1950, Nepal at last gave permission for the 1950 French Annapurna expedition to attempt Dhaulagiri or Annapurna I, the two highest peaks in the Annapurna region. The expedition, led by Maurice Herzog, mounted a successful summit attempt via the North Face. For most Himalayan mountains, the easiest route to the summit is along a ridge route but, for Annapurna, the North Face is not too steep (though it is very exposed to avalanches) and the route subsequently turned out to be the easiest. Although it was the first climbed of the eight-thousanders, Annapurna is not often climbed and there is a high death rate among those attempting it.

=== Start of rock climbing in Himalaya ===
After years of stagnation between the wars, British rock climbing underwent a renaissance, particularly with working-class climbing clubs starting up in the north of England and Scotland. The Rock and Ice Club in Manchester, the Creagh Dhu Mountaineering Club in Glasgow, and several university climbing clubs were amongst those that engendered a highly competitive climbing environment. At Clogwyn Du'r Arddu in Wales, numerous routes of a very high standard were achieved using strictly free climbing techniques. Hamish MacInnes and Dougal Haston, although not members, climbed with Creagh Dhu, and MacInnes had mentored Chris Bonington's youthful climbing as early as 1953.

In 1960, Bonington, as a member of a joint British–Indian–Nepalese army team led by Jimmy Roberts, reached the summit of the 26,039-foot (7,937 m) Annapurna II, 20 miles (32 km) east of the range's main summit, Annapurna I. The route did not involve rock climbing.

Mount Everest was ascended in 1963 by an American team along a deliberately difficult route along its West Ridge. Two years later, when planning with the American John Harlin for Harlin's direttissima attempt on the North Face of the Eiger, Harlin introduced Bonington to the American big wall technique of directly ascending a fixed rope using jumars. Harlin fell to his death and Haston's success on the route were reported on by Bonington and Mick Burke who were on the North Face as climbing journalist and cameraman. The publicity led to the televising of a climb of the Old Man of Hoy in Scotland, this time featuring Bonington and Haston. From this start, commercial sponsorship became a possibility for rock climbing and more elaborate and ambitious expeditions could be planned. With all fourteen 8000-metre peaks climbed by 1964, Himalayan expeditions using rock climbing routes became an opportunity Bonington wanted to seize.

Encouraged by Roberts, Bonington conceived of the idea of climbing Annapurna by its South Face, which he realised was going to require not just rock climbing, but also siege climbing tactics, given that the ascent would take many weeks. No one had tried rock climbing at high altitude before. The face itself was almost twice as high as the 6,000 feet (1,800 m) Eigerwand and even above the rock band there were another 3,000 feet (910 m) to the summit. The topography near the summit could be assessed from photographs Bonington had taken on the Annapurna II expedition of ten years earlier.

=== Planning ===
Annapurna South Face
- Clip from TV programme
- Annapurna
- Annapurna: The Hardest Way Up

With financial support for the expedition from the Mount Everest Foundation, Bonington assembled a team from amongst his friends: Nick Estcourt, Martin Boysen, Ian Clough, Mike Thompson, Burke, and Haston. Advised to include an American to boost sales of the book he was planning, Bonington appointed Tom Frost who had considerable big wall experience in Yosemite as well as – secretly at the time – Nanda Devi on a CIA mission to install a nuclear-powered listening device for monitoring Chinese missiles. Frost was known to and respected by Haston and Don Whillans. Whillans was to be deputy leader for, although by then he was an overweight heavy drinker and smoker who disliked Bonington, he had more Himalayan experience than any other British mountaineer still active. Indeed, of the team assembled, only he, Bonington and Clough had been to Himalaya at all. Also included as climbers were Kelvin Kent, base camp manager, and David Lambert, the doctor. A four-man television team from ITN and Thames Television was to accompany them.

=== Departure ===
They took 18,000 feet (5,500 m) of rope for fixing (they did not use their climbing rope), 40 cylinders of oxygen and six breathing sets. The baggage was sent from London by sea with Whillans and Lambert flying to Bombay (Note: Mumbai is the present name.) to see to its unloading and transport to Pokhara by lorry. However, the ship was then delayed by about three weeks so Bonington arranged for Whillans and Lambert to travel to Kathmandu to reconnoitre the approach route instead of waiting at Bombay, and Clough would go to Bombay to deal with the baggage. They took oxygen cylinders intending to use supplementary oxygen above about 22,500 feet (6,900 m) but it was very little used for climbing and not at all above Camp VI. It was used, however, for people who had become ill.

== Expedition ==
=== March-in and Base Camp ===
Approach route from Pokhara to Annapurna Base Camp

In March 1970, the expedition flew to Kathmandu and then on to Pokhara, trekking to the southern vicinity of Annapurna along an easy route. Unlike twenty years earlier when Herzog had no satisfactory map and had to pioneer a route, by 1970, the track was well known even to hippie wanderers. (Note: The eight-day trek route from Pokhara went up beside the Seti Khola River and then the Modi Khola (a tributary of the Gandaki River). Bonington notes passing through Naudanda, Lumle, Chondracot (now Chandrakot), Ghandrung (now Ghandruk), Chomro (now Chhomrong), Thomo and Hinko Cave.) Another change was that the Sherpas were no longer unsophisticated peasants – they were smart in appearance, spoke good English and had a Western attitude. Pasang Kami, the sirdar, treated the sahibs as equals and this was reciprocated. The other Sherpas were Pemba Tharkay, Ang Pema, Mingma Tsering, Nima Tsering and Kancha. As it turned out, a group from the British Army Mountaineering Association, led by Henry Day, was setting off at the same time for an ascent on Herzog's north face route and they had greatly helped Bonington by flying out 1,500 pounds (680 kg) of baggage to supply him until his main baggage arrived.

On 16 March, Whillans, Thompson, and two Sherpas went ahead of the main parties to reconnoitre the route and to find a suitable place for the base camp. A temporary location was found to be at the entrance to the Annapurna Sanctuary at the location of a previous base camp: that of the 1957 expedition to Machapuchare. The slower-moving baggage train of 140 porters set off from Pokhara on 22 March, and Clough and his 240 porters were able to leave Bombay with the delayed baggage on 24 March.

Bonington and Whillans met up on 27 March, and Whillans said he thought he and his Sherpas had seen a yeti and had photographed the footprints. More significantly, he had been able to identify a climbing route up the mountain's south face. After the whole party had gathered at the temporary base camp on 29 March, an advance party, including Whillans, Haston and Burke, established a final base camp at 14,000 feet (4,300 m), three miles from the foot of the face. Estcourt used a theodolite to make accurate altitude measurements of various points on the face, because foreshortening makes estimation inaccurate. The porters returned to Pokhara from where many of them would help move up to Base Camp, the main baggage being carried from Bombay by the party led by Clough, Thompson, and Kent. Meanwhile, the lead climbers and Sherpas were left to ferry the advance baggage up to the final Base Camp. The monsoon was due at about the end of May.

=== Climbing route ===
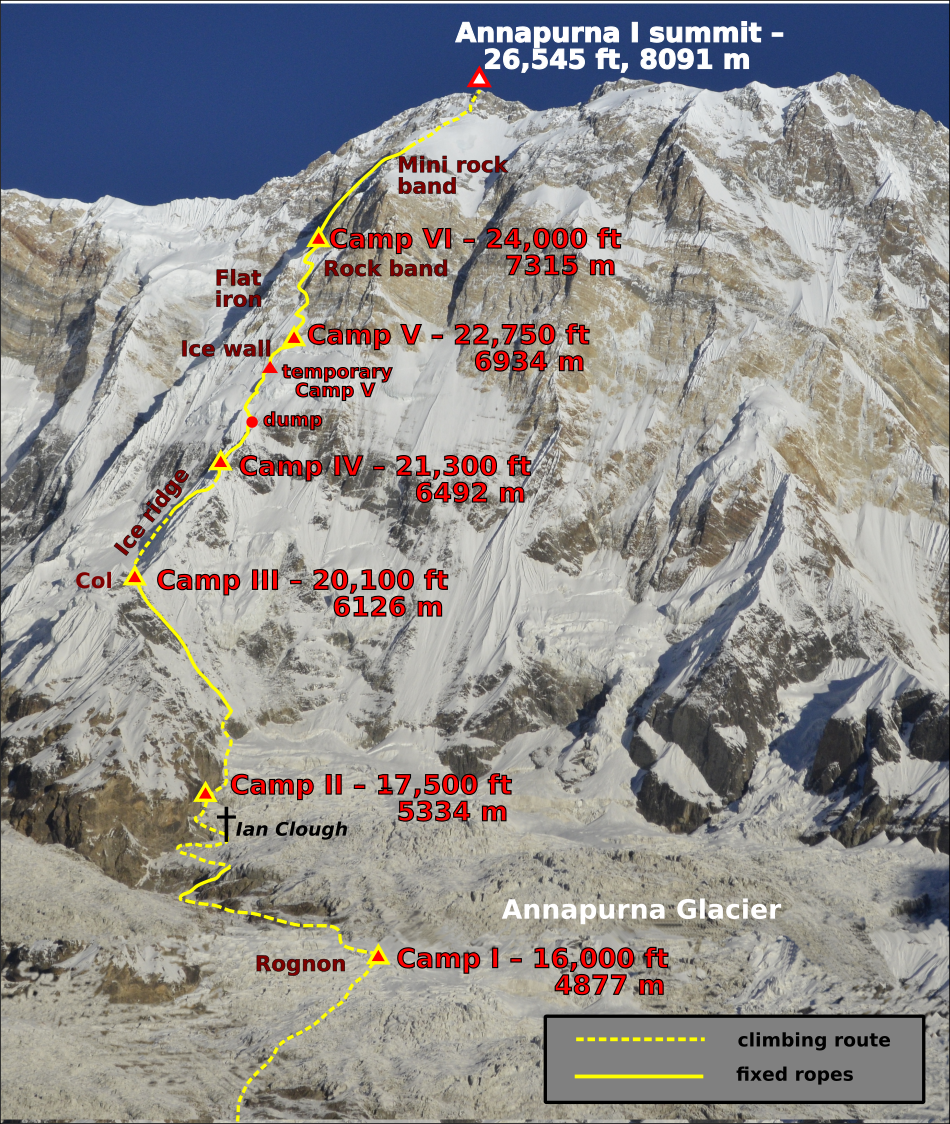
Climbing route up South Face

Between Camp III at 20,100 feet (6,100 m) and the top of the Rock Band at 24,750 feet (7,540 m), the average slope is 55°. (Note: Bonington compares this with 44° on the Brenva face of Mont Blanc and 61° on the Walker Spur of the Grandes Jorasses.)

Locations of camps on mountain
Camp	Altitude		Occupied (Note: Dates of occupation unless noted otherwise.)	Description
Camp	feet (Note: Altitudes unless noted otherwise.)	metres (Note: Altitudes in metres calculated from referenced figures in feet.)	Occupied	Description
Temporary Base	12,000	3,700	28 March (Note: Date of occupation by main party; for advance party – 21 March.)	sited at Base Camp of 1957 Machapuchare expedition
Base	14,000	4,300	31 March	side of Annapurna glacier
Camp I	16,000	4,900	2 April	on "rognon" (island of rock in glacier)
Camp II	17,500	5,300	6 April	under rock overhang
Camp III	20,100	6,100	13 April	large, flat area at Col
Camp IV	21,300	6,500	23 April	sloping 30° on Ice Ridge
dump	21,650	6,600	11 May	col at top of Ice Ridge
temporary Camp V	22,500 (Note: 8,500 feet above Base Camp at 14,000 feet.)	6,900	6 May	foot of Ice Wall, vulnerable to snow sliding from above
Camp V	22,750	6,930	9 May	bergschrund at foot of Rock Band
Camp VI	24,000	7,300	19 May	tiny platform carved in snow at top of Flat Iron
Summit	26,545	8,091	27 May	

=== To Camp III and abortive start up Ice Ridge ===
Whillans and Haston had found a difficult route across the glacier and up to a rognon – an island of rock on a glacier – where Camp I was planned, and then reached the flattish top of the rognon where Camp I would be just far enough away from the face – about a mile away – to avoid avalanche danger. Bonington and Burke relocated the lower part of the route, hoping to make it suitable for porters.

The ridge they were to use at the start of the climb was straightforwardly approached across the glacier, but steep cliffs barred the way onto the ridge itself, so they skirted these on the right to reach a site for Camp II, lower than hoped for but with nowhere suitable immediately higher. For a short distance the route was seriously threatened by an ice overhang which they called the "Sword of Damocles," but they decided to reduce the risk by moving under it as quickly as possible.

When he arrived with the main baggage, Clough was supposed to stop at Hinko Cave overnight on 7 April, but due to confusing instructions, he continued on in a snowstorm with his entourage of 240 porters to temporary base camp some miles further on. Some porters had refused to go beyond Hinko Cave and the rest, overloaded and without adequate clothes and shoes in the bad weather, variously got into states of anger and collapse. However, now the main gear had arrived, it was possible to sort out shelter under cover for the night and provide medical help when necessary. On this same day, Whillans and Haston had reached the Ice Ridge at a col where Camp III was to be established. They had to climb through deep snow in bad weather. In ten days, the expedition had got from the Sanctuary to half height on the face, although with the difficult climbing all to be done further ahead. They abseiled down to Camp II from where, next day, they started placing fixed ropes towards the col.

On 11 March, Boysen and Estcourt established Camp III on the col, where there were to be two Whillans Box tents at a spacious location, free from risk of avalanches or falling rocks. The version used on Annapurna, designed by Whillans, was cuboid in shape, 6.5 by 4.0 by 4 feet (2.0 m × 1.2 m × 1.2 m), made of socketed aluminium tubes covered in nylon top and bottom and cotton-terylene at the sides. It was strengthened with nylon webbing straps and at one end was a nylon-zipped entrance. An inner nylon tent was available but not always used. It weighed 30 pounds (14 kg) (Note: In comparison the nylon tents of a hooped design, Bonington calls them RAFMA tents, weighed only 10 pounds (4.5 kg).)

On 12 April, after Bonington had organised the logistics of establishing and equipping Base Camp, he and Frost set from there so that on 14 April they could start to prospect a route up the Ice Ridge above Camp III. After investigating a snow shelf leading to a gully on the west of the ridge, Bonington decided avalanches posed too great a threat, so he joined Frost, who was ascending along the actual crest of the ridge. However, this turned out to be much more difficult than they had expected, with snow too soft and loose for firm piton placements; there would be a need to set fixed ropes all the way up the ridge. Also, they had not formed a plan for placing fixed ropes – should the lead climber fix his rope or should he climb normally leaving the second climber to pay out a rope from his rucksack, fixing it as he climbed? To begin with, the latter method seemed more successful, but progress was dreadfully slow with Bonington never having previously encountered such appalling snow. Later in the expedition, the technique changed, and they climbed using their 9-millimetre (0.35 in) fixed rope which they then secured with pitons and karabiners, not using their 11-millimetre (0.43 in) climbing rope at all.

That night at Camp III they discussed their religious beliefs – Bonington was a sceptic and Frost a Mormon. Bonington wrote to his wife, "He is a convinced and fervent Mormon, never rams it down your throat, yet his faith has given him a code of conduct that puts him way out in front of most of us." The next day, it was straightforward to re-climb their fixed rope, but once again, onward climbing was extremely difficult. Whillans and Haston had been ferrying supplies from Camp II up to Camp III, and following their second climb, they started exploring the shelf which Bonington had investigated previously beside the ridge. They made such good progress that the pair on the ridge needed little persuasion to entirely abandon their efforts on the lowest part of the ridge.

The next day, all four climbers set off along the shelf with Haston breaking trail and never surrendering the lead. The avalanche risk was considerable, even though they kept their distance from the ridge, and matters got worse as they reached the gully threatened by avalanches from ice cliffs thousands of feet above and by cornices on the ridge itself. They decided to avoid the gully by climbing a minor arête which led from the foot of the gully up to a high point on the main ridge, but they had to leave a deadman anchor when deteriorating weather forced them to retreat to camp. The next day, Bonington and Frost came within 50 feet (15 m) of the crest of the Ice Ridge, but again bad weather forced a retreat.

By 18 April, only 1,000 feet (300 m) had been gained since the Col had been reached eleven days earlier. On 19 April, Haston again ascended the minor arête where the way to the main ridge was blocked by huge cornices but he found he could slip through gaps in the rotten snow between the wall of the ridge and one of the cornices. However, after reaching the crest of main ridge and fixing a rope he was forced back by the weather. At last, two days later, he was able to reach the Ice Ridge and find an ideal place for Camp IV.

The expedition was unexpectedly enhanced when four trekkers – the Sherpas called them the "London Sherpas" – turned up at Base Camp completely unexpectedly. (Note: The trekkers had left Essex in England in 1969 in a Land Rover, planning to climb in the Hindu Kush. Delayed in Austria they had spent the winter in Afghanistan and then had driven to Kathmandu, flown to Pokhara, trekked over to the foothills of Dhaulagiri and crossed to Chomro via the Deroli Pass intending to reach the Annapurna Sanctuary. The Deroli Pass, now more usually referred to as the Deurali Pass, is on the Annapurna Circuit trail, near Ghorepani and Poon Hill.) In return for "board and lodging" the two men helped carry loads even as high as Camp IV and the women helped at Base Camp where Bonington thought their presence engendered a more civilised and relaxed air. Other trekkers also turned up to get a grandstand view of the climb and to help carrying loads.

=== Camp IV to Camp V on the Rock Band ===
Boysen, Estcourt, Haston and Whillans worked together establishing Camp IV, but the situation at Camp III became critical after several attempts to supply it from Camp II had failed because of deep snow and avalanches. Eventually, an overnight carry was successful, and it generally seemed that snow conditions improved the higher one got up the mountain.

Boysen and Estcourt tackled the upper part of the Ice Ridge above Camp IV, which was very narrow with cornices to the left but solid rock on the right. At one point, Boysen's progress was blocked except for a 20-foot (6.1 m) tunnel which he could clamber through, without his rucksack, as if potholing. The tunnel led not further up the ridge but out onto an ice cliff with a 2,000-foot (610 m) drop to the glacier. However, he managed to climb onto and up the cliff despite the drag of his climbing rope passing along a highly contorted route behind him. When he reached safety, he had let out 150 feet (46 m) of rope in ascending only 50 feet (15 m). It was the most difficult ice climb Boysen had ever done. There was no direct way for Estcourt to ascend to Boysen's stance, so he had to repeat the circuitous climb. Boysen's next lead again went on to a traverse, which was later called the "Terrible Traverse", which he was not able to complete before descending to Camp IV for the night. They had spent all day climbing 300 feet (91 m). The next day, it again proved impossible to keep to the crest of the ridge, but a descent on the right to solid rock gave access to an ice-covered rock wall leading upwards. They climbed without the rope being secured with pitons, because the rope would have jammed along its contorted route. They regained the ridge again only some 50 feet (15 m) higher than they had reached the previous day. The following day they extended their route slightly further. After that, they had to go down to recover from exhaustion, but the fixed ropes they had left allowed everyone following to take a direct line, though one that was neither safe nor easy.

Bonington and Clough took over the work of extending the route, reaching Camp IV on 27 April. Sometimes, they advanced only 10 feet (3.0 m) in an hour. At Whillans' suggestion, they arranged for Sherpas to carry all the climbers' supplies up to Camp III, so that when climbers went down to rest, they only needed to go to Camp III rather than Base Camp. After a few very difficult days, and without being able to regain the crest of the Ice Ridge at a higher point, Clough went down to be replaced by Haston. On 3 May, Whillans, Frost, and Burke carried a box tent up to Camp IV while Bonington and Haston with very difficult ice climbing reached a col at 21,650 feet (6,600 m) where the Ice Ridge terminated and was replaced by a snow slope leading up to the Ice Wall. The next day, they carried a load of ropes to the col, and Haston ran out 500 feet (150 m) of rope towards the Ice Wall. At 22,350 feet (6,810 m), the slope suddenly changed from 45° to vertical, and this point was intended to become Camp V (Note: The site turned out to be very poor so the camp here was only temporary.) where a 18-pound (8.2 kg) hooped tent was set up, capable of sleeping three. Supplying a camp at that height was a logistical problem: it took at least five days for anything to arrive from base camp.

Supported by Frost and Burke, Whillans and Haston established Camp V. That night, spindrift inundated the site and the tent, so they decided to find a better camp location. The next day, they explored the Ice Wall finding a "gangway" leading to the top of the Ice Wall and the foot of the Rock Band. At this point, the overhang of the bergschrund, although threatening, provided excellent shelter, so they proposed moving Camp V to this point. On 9 May, Frost and Burke established the camp at the new, higher location. The climb from Camp IV to V was very long and difficult, so two intermediate dumps (Note: The lower of the dumps was at the top of the Ice Ridge and the other was at the original site for Camp V at the bottom of the Ice Wall.) for supplies were used, the carrying being done in shorter sections from above and below.

=== Above Camp V ===
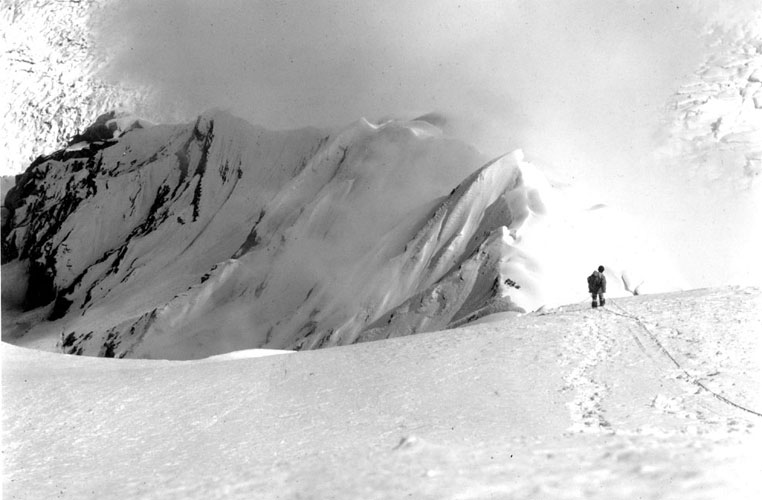
Photograph by Frost: Boysen descending to Camp IV after carrying supplies up to Camp V.

Frost and Burke started on the Rock Band which sloped at about 50° (Note: Bonington likens this to the Second Ice Field on the North face of the Eiger.) Instead of taking the most direct line up a groove leading straight upwards, they cut over to the left, aiming for the "Flat Iron", named after the similar-looking feature on the Eiger, with Burke doing the lead climbing. The good weather helped with the climbing, but because of the thaw they were bombarded from above by falling rocks. The climbers further down the mountain were having to rest due to illness or exhaustion, so shortages of rope, oxygen, tents, food and fuel built up towards Camp V. On 12 May, Burke and Frost made more progress, but only through taking serious risks with inadequate piton placements. When they turned back for the day, a storm hit them and their tent was almost buried. Fortunately, fresh supplies had arrived from lower camps.

Bonington's general plan had been to pair off the leading climbers and to share the work of the pairs equitably by alternating periods of rest, carrying supplies to higher camps and extending the route. The Sherpas were carrying supplies higher up the mountain than expected, and other trekkers with climbing experience had turned up by chance and helped out. However, at the higher camps things were not going so well. On 13 May, Bonington decided that when Frost and Burke came down to rest, they would be replaced by Whillans and Haston. In fact, it was Estcourt and Boysen's turn to force the route upwards, but they had been working hard doing carrying while Whillans and Haston rested. Over the radio between various camps, some of the adversely affected climbers complained, but accepted after Bonington agreed that Whillans and Haston would do a single carry before rotating into the lead. Whillans then started criticising Burke and Frost for making very slow progress on the Rock Band and so, to curtail the increasing bitterness, the radio call was ended, leaving each pair to plan the detail of their newly assigned roles. (Note: Bonington did not think Whillans' criticisms were at all fair. Indeed Burke and Frost has worked hard and made good progress.)

On their last day in the lead, Burke and Frost, possibly goaded by the criticism, managed to fix ropes up all the way to the Flat Iron. Burke had been on the face for 28 days, and Frost only slightly less. Bonington thought Burke's climb had been on the most exacting rock of the entire expedition. When Frost met Bonington down at Camp II, he firmly told him he thought the way he had treated Estcourt and Boysen had wrecked the morale of the expedition – all the same, he maintained his close relationship with Bonington.

On 17 May, Boysen, Whillans, and Haston carried equipment to the top of the Flat Iron to a suitable site for Camp VI, but Boysen had to return to camp to recover. Whillans and Haston found a site for Camp VI, but that night at Camp V, the ridge tent was crushed with an avalanche of snow, so Estcourt and Haston went down to the upper dump to collect the tent intended for Camp VII and to get more food. Climbing back to Camp VI on 19 May, Haston's rucksack, containing his personal gear and food for Camp VI, fell down the mountain. Whillans was left alone at Camp VII with no food after the others had descended. Estcourt was alone at Camp V, and so Bonington ascended to help him support the lead team. The climb from there to Camp VI was even more tiring and Bonington scarcely managed the 200-foot (61 m) jumar climb near the top. However, he managed and even took the time on his way down to relocate the dangling rope and place further pitons on this pitch of the climb. As for oxygen, there were only three bottles at Camp V and another three at the upper dump. There was hardly any food or rope at Camp VI.

On 20 May, Haston returned to Camp VI, where Whillans had been without food for over twenty-four hours. Bonington carried up there more food and a radio, but had to dump the rope slightly below the camp. Camp VI was a terrible place – the tent was too large to fit on the ledge, so Whillans and Haston had to sleep lying across the width of the tent. Also, the wind was severe and the tent was secured only by two tent pegs, a rope over the top, and the weight of the climbers. The same day, Estcourt carried the oxygen bottles up to Camp V from the upper dump, and the lead climbers climbed 400 feet (120 m) up from Camp VI, but they were then out of food and rope and had no tent to pitch for Camp VII which they intended to place at the top of the Rock Band. They heard news that the army team on the other side of the mountain had reached the summit using a similar route to that of the French expedition in 1950.

On 22 May, Bonington and Estcourt headed up with supplies and oxygen cylinders towards Camp VI, but Estcourt had to retreat back and Bonington, who was using supplementary oxygen, had to abandon the tent and oxygen en route. Haston and Whillans had reached the top of the "mini rock band" at the top of the Rock Band but, with no rope left, they had needed to climb without protection, leaving only an estimated 1,500 feet (460 m) to the summit. They had reached the 25,000-foot (7,600 m) snowfield above the Rock Band, but without a tent or food. The next day, Bonington carried a tent, a ciné camera and food up from V to VI, but he had to abandon his personal gear so he had to turn down an offer to join then on a summit attempt, and so had to descend again, but the tent could be carried up next day to be left on the snow field above Camp VI. On 23 May, with insufficient rope and no tent for Camp VII, the lead climbers took a rest day.

In terrible conditions on 24 May, Bonington and Clough managed a carry to Camp VI but found Haston and Whillans had been forced back there. All four climbers were forced to spend the night together in the two-man tent. Bonington and Clough got back to Camp IV, but once there, the weather became impossible.

=== Summit ===
For the next two days, the entire mountain was snowbound and it seemed the monsoon had arrived. However, on 27 May 1970 at Camp VI there was an improvement in the weather. Leaving Camp VI about 07:00, without supplementary oxygen because they had none, Whillans and Haston reached the snow field at 11:00, where they could see the summit through breaks in the cloud. They agreed to move the tent up to establish a camp at a higher location, but they really had a more ambitious goal for the day. Indeed, any camp would be entirely lacking food or sleeping bags. They were faced with an ice plateau leading to a snow ridge and then an 800-foot (240 m) cliff of mixed ice and rock rising up to the top of the mountain. They abandoned the tent at the foot of the ridge and climbed on without belays. Neither climber had any difficulty with breathing.

The last fifty feet of the ice cliff was vertical, though there were good holds, and as they reached the northern side of the mountain, the wind dropped. They could see traces of army boot footprints, but the flag that had been left a week earlier by the army expedition had blown away. Haston took a ciné film of Whillans reaching the summit, and then they swapped places. From the top, which they reached at 14:30 and stayed for about 10 minutes, they could see the other two Annapurna summits, but nothing more. They had 150 feet (46 m) of rope which, after they had abseiled down, was all there was left on the summit. By 17:00 they had managed the difficult descent to Camp VI.

Lower down the mountain, everyone was completely stormbound, but Bonington, confined to Camp IV, put in his routine 17:00 radio call asking Haston if they had been able to get out of their camp. Due to static on the radio he did not hear the reply "Aye, we've just climbed Annapurna" but this was heard loud and clear at Base Camp and the news spread rapidly up the mountain.

=== Leaving the mountain ===
Burke and Frost wanted to make their own attempt on the summit and, contrary to his better judgement, Bonington agreed, subject to the clearing of the camps proceeding at the same time. So on 28 May, Burke and Frost reached Camp III at midday while Whillans and Haston descended. Only by evening did Frost and Burke reach Camp VI. On 29 May, they made their attempt, but Burke had to turn back and Frost, having reached the snowfield, stayed there almost three hours but then turned back in ferocious wind.

On 30 May, the mountain was being cleared with most of the party reaching Base Camp when Thompson rushed down, calling out in despair. He and Clough had been passing under the place of the "Sword of Damocles" when a serac fell, creating an avalanche which killed Clough. (Note: The overhanging wall of ice they called the "Sword of Damocles" had collapsed on 23 May so they thought the location had become less dangerous. However, there were ice towers higher up and it was one of these that fell.) His body was carried down to base camp and he was buried at the foot of a face where Clough had taught the Sherpas and the television crew to use jumars and to abseil. Returning down the valley, they found the earlier snow had melted and flowers were blooming.

== Aftermath ==
The expedition proved to be Britain's most important mountaineering achievement since the 1953 British Mount Everest expedition.

It was a huge success, not only because the summit was reached, but was a difficult technical climb to the summit of a major world peak. The expedition was at the beginning of a trend that shifted away from taking the easiest route on a high Himalayan peak towards choosing a more direct and difficult route. For the first time in Britain, a television audience had been able to watch the climb as it progressed. At least once a week, interviews with the climbers and film of the climb itself were shown on News at Ten, and it was possible to show film from the summit only five days after it had been taken. The film was carried back to base camp, taken by runner to Pokhara, and then from there to London by air. Afterwards, a one-hour documentary was shown on Thames Television.

Bonington went on to lead further Himalayan expeditions – the Everest Southwest Face expedition of 1975 was a direct successor, with Boysen and Thompson participating, and Haston among those who reached the summit. On this occasion, Burke died when attempting the summit by himself. Whillans was invited on no more Bonington expeditions. Haston died skiing off piste in the Swiss Alps in 1977, and Estcourt was killed in 1978 on K2 on another Bonington expedition. By 1984, Pasang Kami owned the most lavish hotel in Kathmandu, built up from a yak shelter. It had a penthouse restaurant and was equipped with electric lighting.

Between 8–9 October 2013, Ueli Steck claimed to have climbed the South Face solo to reach Annapurna's summit, with no rope or a support team, taking 28 hours in total over the climb from base camp and the descent.
