= West Calder High School =

Location
- Limefield Lane; West Calder, EH55 8BF; Scotland; 55°51′13.32″N 3°33′34.4″W

Information
- Motto: Ambition, Respect, Equity - We ARE West Calder High School
- Religious affiliation: Non-denominational
- Head Teacher: Mr Gerard Higgins
- Gender: Mixed
- Age: 11 to 18
- Enrolment: 1,250
- Houses: Harburn and Limefield
- Colours: Red, Black & Hint of silver
- Website: wchs.westlothian.org.uk

West Calder High School is a secondary school in West Calder, West Lothian, Scotland. The current school building was officially opened in 2018 by former Prime Minister Gordon Brown, the UN's Special Envoy for Global Education.

== History ==
The school first opened in 1965 to take up to 750 pupils from the Calders Area of West Lothian, Scotland, which includes East Calder, Mid Calder, West Calder and Polbeth.

The current West Calder High School, the fourth to bear the name, was opened to staff and pupils in August 2018. Construction of the new school began in 2016. The school cost £32 million and was completed both on time and within budget. The 1,100 capacity school is West Lothian's biggest single investment in education and has been designed with the pupil experience at the core, as well as providing facilities accessible to the local community. The project was completed by Morrison Construction with developer Hub South East. The school was officially opened on 8 November 2018 by the UN Special Envoy for Global Education, the Rt Hon Gordon Brown, former UK Prime Minister.

Since its opening, the designers of the new West Calder High School building, NORR UK, were nominated for but did not win an award in the 'Pupil Experience' category at the 2018 Education Building Scotland Awards in November 2018. In 2019, the school won Project of the Year title at the Education Buildings Scotland Awards.

In March 2016 inspectors from Education Scotland visited the previous school building to carry out an inspection. This highlighted strengths and areas for improvement and identified that the school needed additional support to improve. A follow-up visit was made by Education Scotland in June 2017 highlighting improvements made. In 2021, it was reported that the school had made significant gains in improving academic achievement. In May 2021, The Times reported that the school was placed in the top 20 of their school League Table and observed that it had become Scotland's most improved high school with 70 per cent of pupils attaining a gold standard of five highers or more.

== Organisation ==
West Calder High School covers a large catchment area, from the boundary with Edinburgh City Council in the east, to Lanarkshire in the west. Six 'cluster' Primary Schools currently feed into it:

- Addiewell Primary School
- Calderwood Primary School
- East Calder Primary School
- Kirknewton Primary School, which also feeds into Balerno High School
- Mid Calder Primary School
- Parkhead Primary School
- Woodmuir Primary School.

In the 2026-27 academic year, the school has a pupil roll of 1,250 and a teaching complement of 77 FTE. The Senior Leadership Team consists of 1 Head Teacher, 3 substantive Depute Head Teachers, 1 Acting Depute Head Teachers (0.5FTE) and an Area Business Manager.

== Notable alumni ==
- Dougal Haston (1940–1977), mountaineer
- Angela Constance (born 1970), politician
