= Drohmo =

Multi-peaked mountain in Eastern Nepal

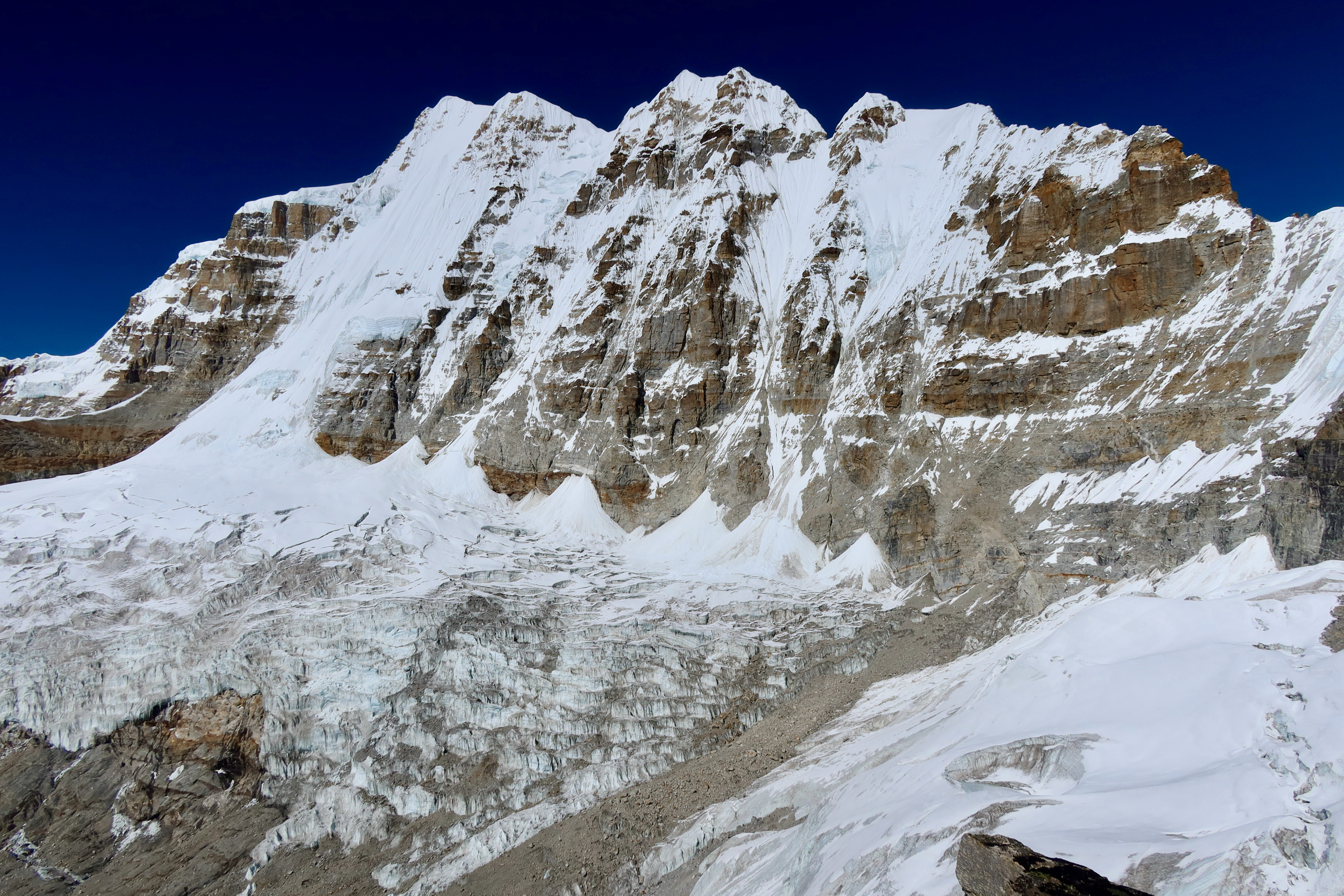
- Drohmo from southeast

Highest point
- Elevation: 6,881 m (22,575 ft)
- Listing: Mountains of Nepal
- Coordinates: 27°49′28″N 88°06′08″E

Naming
- Native name: द्रोहमो

Geography
- Location within Koshi Province Location within Nepal
- Country: Nepal
- Parent range: Himalayas

Climbing
- First ascent: No record
- Normal route: South pillar (Nepal)

Drohmo (also known as Drohmo Ri) is a multi-peaked mountain located at 6,881 m (22,575 ft) in Eastern Nepal.

== Location ==
Drohmo is located in Janak mountain range in Eastern Nepal Mountain Range. The peak is 3.5km north east of Tengkoma, 5.4km south of Janak Chuli on Nepal China border, and 7.8km west of Pathibhara Chuli. In addition to the main summit at 6,881 m (22,575 ft), the Drohmo also has a central summit at 6,855 m (22,490 ft) and an east summit 6,695 m (21,965 ft). A sub-peak Drohmo II rises even further to the east with at 6,559 m (21,519 ft).

== Climbing history ==
Drohmo was first attempted by a Swiss team in 1949, but they were unsuccessful. To date, no one has summited the main Drohmo peak. However, the central summit was first climbed in 1998 by Doug Scott and Roger Mear via the south pillar. Another ascent of the central summit in 2002 was successfully executed by the Slovene Aleš Koželj and Mitja Šorn but they took a different route via the south pillar.

== Gallery ==
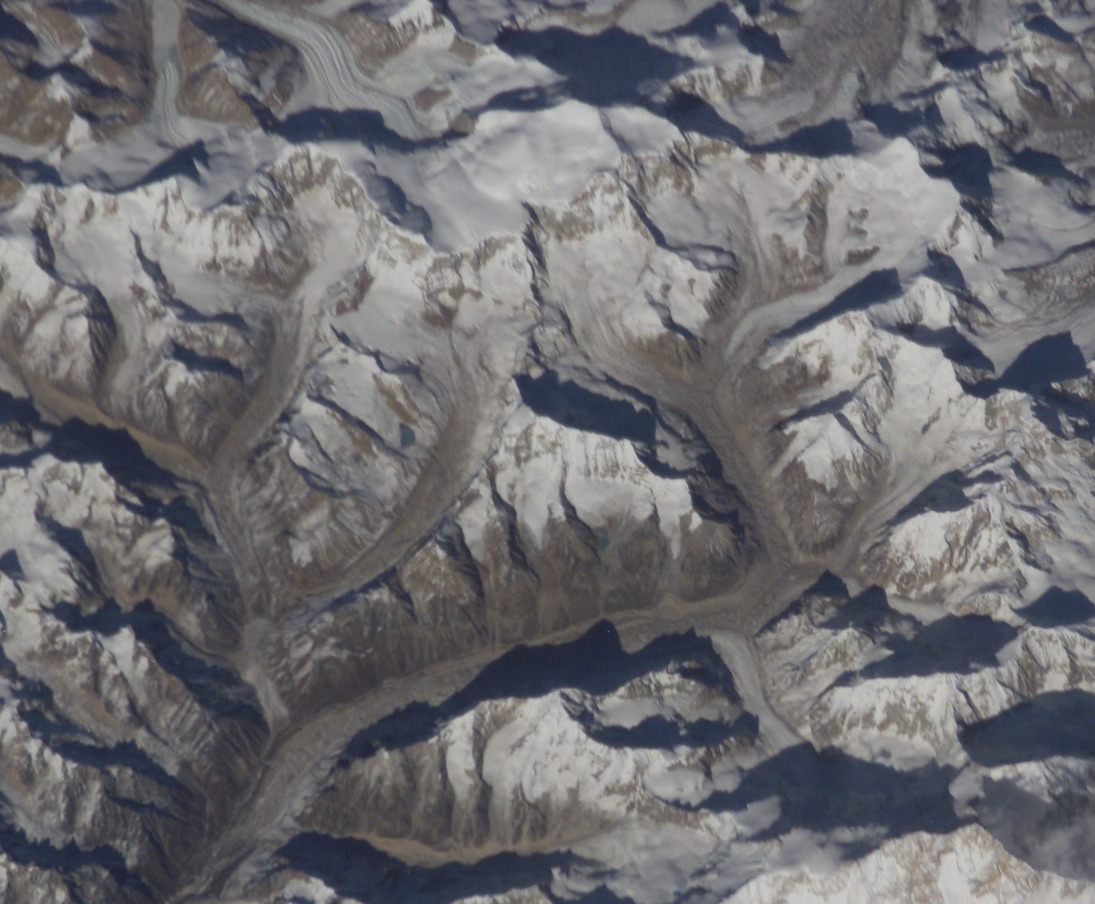
Drohmo Ri North of Mount Merra and Kangchenjunga, Jongsang Ri and Langpo Glaciers
