= Jan Długosz (mountaineer) =

Polish mountaineer and writer

Jan Długosz (12 July 1929, Warsaw, Poland - 2 July 1962, in High Tatras) was a Polish mountaineer and writer. He lived in Kraków (South Poland). In 1961 he participated in the first ascent of the Central Pillar of Frêney on Mont Blanc by a British-Polish team (with Don Whillans, Chris Bonington and Ian Clough).

== Career ==
Długosz became the leading Polish climber in the mid-1950s due to his significant climbs in the Tatras, including the two hardest routes at that time (and needing new aid equipment), routes in 1955 (so-called Wariant R on the Mnich, with Andrzej Pietsch, and the left side of Kazalnica, with Czesław Momatiuk). He made the first winter ascents of the biggest walls in Polish Tatras in 1956-57, which demanded innovative tactics and techniques.

He successfully climbed in the Alps (in 1957, the eighth overall ascent of the west face of Aiguille du Dru, with Momatiuk and Stanisław Biel), in 1960 Grand Capucin and 1961, attempt to Eiger and in August 1961 the 1st ascent of the Central Pillar of Frêney, considered then as 'The last problem of the Alps' which had seen a month earlier the tragic Bonatti-Mazeaud drama in which they lost four of their companions) and in Caucasus (1958 Ullu-Tau, 1959 Dykh-Tau and Shkhara).

== Writings ==
He was the author of more than 60 articles and stories about mountaineering which were published in professional magazines and popular media. Although he had tried to get a compilation of his best works published, the book wasn't pushed until nearly two years after his death. The book Komin Pokutników (eng. The Chimney of Penitents), including 13 mountaineering stories, appeared in 1964 and is still considered one of the best books about climbing written in Polish (at least 5 next editions till 2008). Two further books, one with his early stories and one with articles, the scenario of a documentary film, songs, and poems for cabaret) were published in 1994 and 1995.

Jan Długosz died on 12 July 1962 in an accident, falling from the ridge of Zadni Kościelec in High Tatras (during a climb in relatively easy terrain, when he worked as a supervisor who controlled the training of climbing of special forces – the weather was foggy and for a few hours no one noticed what had happened).

== Bibliography ==
- 1964 – Komin Pokutników (set of 13 climbing stories). Publisher "Iskry", Warszawa 1964, series "Naokoło świata", pp. 301; next editions 1993, 1994
- 1994 – Komin Pokutników (set of 13 climbing stories), 1st full edition (from original manuscripts and notes, with added 60-page historical comments, climbing routes depicted, maps, by Ewa Dereń, Grzegorz Głazek), "Text", Warszawa 1994, ISBN 83-86144-01-7, pp. 281; "2nd full edition" publ. by "Ati", Kraków 1995, ISBN 83-86219-14-9, pp. 295

== Sources ==
- 1967 – "Taternik" (magazine) No 3, 1967, issue In memoriam Jan Długosz (pp. 111–130) (in Polish), with the list of his ascents and publications
- Zofia Radwańska-Paryska, Witold Henryk Paryski, Wielka Encyklopedia Tatrzańska (WET, engl. "The Great Encyclopedia of Tatras"), Wydawnictwo Górskie, Poronin (Poland) 1995, reprint edition 2004; ISBN 83-7104-009-1, entry Jan Długosz (p. 216) (in Polish)
  (also exists as electronic version: a) on the CD ROM published by Wydawnictwo Naukowe PWN, Warszawa 1999; ISBN 83-01-12853-4, b) available in internet, see External links)
- Ivan Dieška a kolektív, Horolezectvo – encyklopédia, „Šport”, Bratislava 1986 (in Slovak); ISBN 80-7096-015-9, entry Jan Długosz (p. 79)
