= Ian Clough =

British mountain climber

- Born: 13 March 1937; Baildon, Yorkshire, UK
- Died: 30 May 1970 (aged 33); South face of Annapurna
- Cause of death: Serac fall
- Occupations: Climbing school operator in Glen Coe, Scotland
- Known for: First British ascent of the north face of the Eiger
- Spouse: Nikki Clough
- Children: 1, Jennifer

Ian Clough (13 March 1937 – 30 May 1970) was a British mountaineer who was killed on the 1970 British Annapurna expedition led by Sir Chris Bonington to climb the south face of the Himalayan massif. He was later described by Bonington as "the most modest man I ever had the good luck to climb with" and "the kindest and most selfless partner I ever had."

== Climbing career ==
Clough was born on 13 March 1937 in the Yorkshire town of Baildon, near Bradford, and learned to climb on the gritstone edges near his home. He did his National Service in the RAF, and he joined the RAF Kinloss Mountain Rescue Service. He supported himself after leaving National Service in various jobs, including running a small climbing school from the cottage he and his wife Nikki Clough owned at Glen Coe. Now one of the best British climbers of his generation, he made many difficult ascents in the Alps, including the first ascent of the Central Pillar of Frêney on Mont Blanc with Don Whillans, Chris Bonington and Jan Długosz in 1961 and the first British ascent of the North Face of the Eiger, with Bonington in 1962. He climbed widely in Britain too, publishing a guide to the Scottish Highlands in 1969, and in 1968 he and the Scottish mountaineer Tom Patey were the first to climb Am Buachaille, a sea stack at Sandwood Bay off the coast of Sutherland. Two years later, both Clough and Patey died in separate climbing accidents within five days of one another. When Clough died on 30 May 1970, he would have been unaware Patey had been killed abseiling down another Scottish sea stack on 25 May. His wife Nikki Clough, who later died of cancer, was also a mountaineer and climbed the north face of the Matterhorn with her husband.

== Expedition to Annapurna ==
In 1970, Clough took part in the expedition to Annapurna led by Chris Bonington, but after the successful ascent of the south face by Dougal Haston and Don Whillans, Clough was killed by a falling sérac (ice-pillar) just below Camp 2 as he was descending the mountain's lower slopes. Bonington dedicated his book Annapurna South Face (1971) with the words "To IAN CLOUGH, who gave so much", and a meeting-place and arts venue in Clough's hometown of Baildon was named "Ian Clough Hall" in his honour.

== 1999 Memorial ==
In November 1999 a brass plaque was erected in Clough's memory at Annapurna base camp. The text of the plaque reads:

IN MEMORY OF
IAN CLOUGH
MEMBER OF THE 1970 CHRIS BONINGTON EXPEDITION
ANNAPURNA SOUTH FACE
KILLED ON DESCENT IN THE ICE FALL
NOVEMBER 1999

The plaque was commissioned by Kelvin Kent, who had been base camp manager on the expedition. An earlier memorial at the site is an inscription above his grave there, reading "Ian Clough, killed May 30, 1970", cut into rock with an accompanying message in a local language. The burial site was suggested by Sherpas on the expedition and lies below a rock wall where he gave them climbing lessons.

== Bibliography ==
- Ben Nevis and Glencoe, Ian Clough 1965
- Winter Climbs: Ben Nevis and Glencoe, Ian Clough (ed. Alan Kimber) 1981
- Annapurna South Face, Chris Bonington 1971 (book dedicated to Clough's memory)
