= Doug Scott =

English mountaineer and author (1941–2020)

Doug Scott CBE
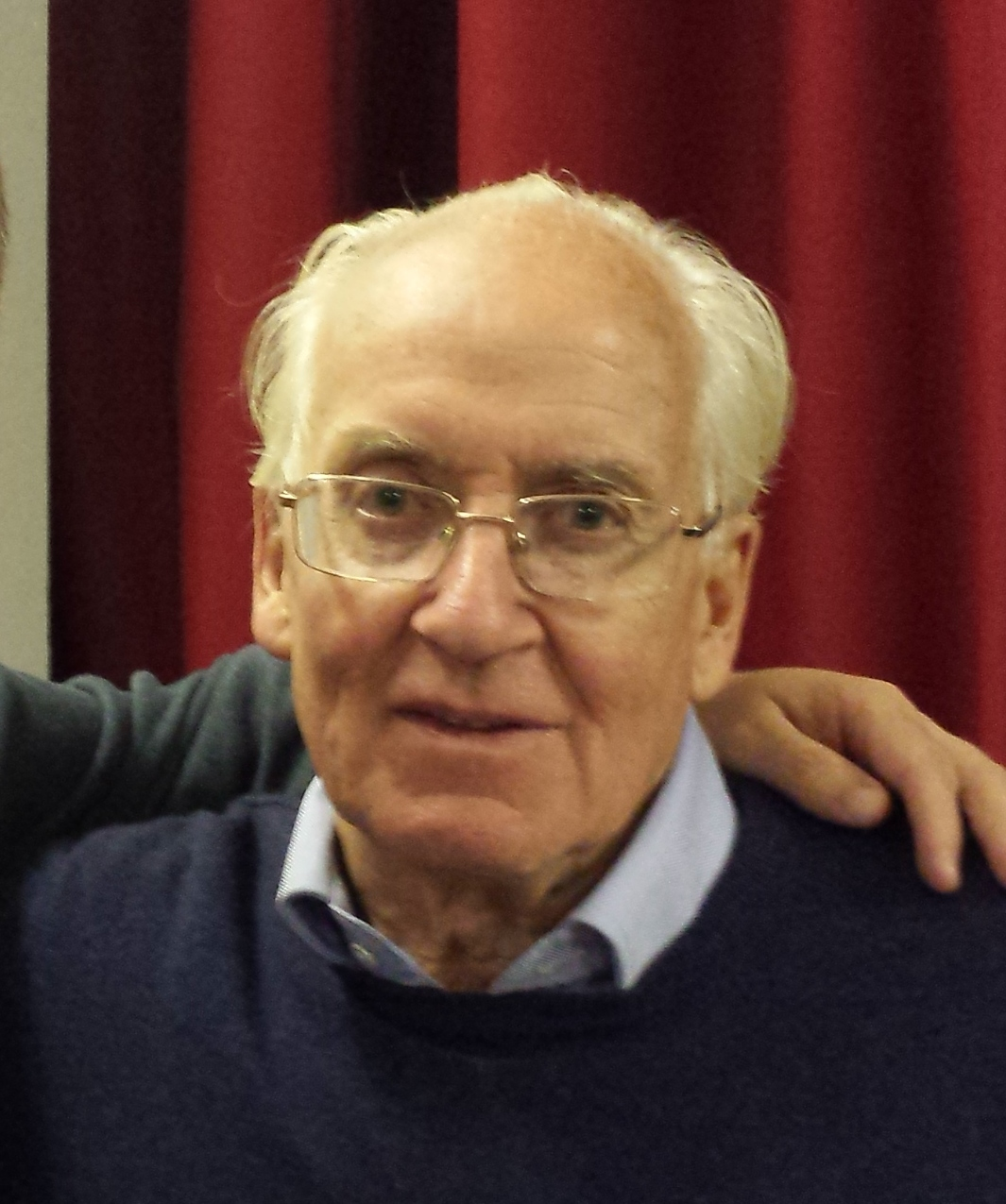
- Scott in 2015
- Born: Douglas Keith Scott; 29 May 1941; Nottingham, Nottinghamshire, England, UK
- Died: 7 December 2020 (aged 79); Cumbria, England, UK
- Citizenship: British
- Occupations: Mountaineer, author
- Organization: Past President of the Alpine Club
- Known for: Ascent of Mount Everest
- Awards: Royal Geographical Society Gold Medal; Piolet d'Or Lifetime Achievement Award

Douglas Keith Scott CBE (29 May 1941 – 7 December 2020) was an English mountaineer and climbing author, noted for being on the team that made the first ascent of the south-west face of Mount Everest on 24 September 1975. In receiving one of mountaineering's highest honours, the Piolet d'Or Lifetime Achievement Award, his personal style and his climbs were described as "visionary".

Over the years he was on 40 expeditions to the high mountains of Asia, during which he made some 30 first ascents. In 2020 he was diagnosed with cancer, and he died of the disease in December 2020.

== Early life ==
Scott was born in Nottingham, England, and was the eldest of three sons. Scott would later discover that his mother was born at almost the exact same time as famed mountaineer Edmund Hillary, which Scott felt was an uncanny coincidence.

Scott was educated in Nottingham at Cottesmore Secondary Modern and Mundella Grammar schools. He started climbing at the age of 13, his interest sparked by seeing climbers on the Black Rocks in Derbyshire whilst hiking with the Scouts. His father, George Scott, was a policeman and amateur boxer, who was the Amateur Boxing Association 1945 British Heavyweight Champion. His father gave up the game to focus on the family. Scott lived on the outskirts of Nottingham with his father and mother, Edith Scott, and younger brothers, Brian and Garry. All were encouraged towards the open countryside, particularly the Peak District.

After two years at Loughborough Teachers' Training College (1959–61), Scott taught geography, history, PE and games for ten years at his old secondary modern school.

== Career ==
=== Mountaineering ===
Scott was considered one of the world's leading high-altitude and big-wall climbers and was the recipient of numerous awards for his achievements. He was the first English person to reach the summit of Mount Everest and, on the descent, he survived an unplanned bivouac with Dougal Haston 100 metres below the summit, without oxygen, sleeping bags and, as it turned out, without frostbite. Apart from his first ascent of the southwest face of Everest with Haston in 1975, all his other Himalayan climbs were achieved in lightweight or pure Alpine style. He pioneered big wall climbing on Baffin Island, Mount Kenya and in the Karakoram, famously on the "fearsome Karakoram peak" The Ogre in Pakistan with Chris Bonington, and later on Shivling in the Indian Himalayas. Abseiling from the summit of The Ogre, Scott slipped and broke both his legs at 7,200 metres. With rescue not a possibility at that height, Scott crawled on his knees back to base camp through a storm, on a mountain of considerable difficulty, helped down by his teammates Mo Anthoine and Clive Rowland. It remains one of the great survival stories in world mountaineering.

Scott was a founder member of the Nottingham Climbers Club (1961), president of the Alpine Climbing Group (1976–82), vice president of the British Mountaineering Council (1994–97) and president of the Alpine Club (1999–2001). He was made a CBE in 1994. In 1999 he was awarded the Patron's Medal of the Royal Geographical Society. In 2005 he was presented with the Golden Eagle Award by the Outdoor Writers and Photographers Guild. Also in 2005, following on from Tom Weir and Adam Watson, he became the third recipient of the John Muir Trust Lifetime Achievement Award in recognition of his mountaineering accomplishments and commitment to conservation and supporting mountain people and mountain environments around the world. Following on from Walter Bonatti and Reinhold Messner he received the Piolet d'Or Lifetime Achievement Award in Chamonix in 2011.

Scott was made a Freeman of the City of Nottingham in 1976 and has since had a Nottingham tram named after him. He was awarded an honorary MA by the universities of Nottingham and Loughborough, 1993; Hon. MEd Nottingham Trent, 1995; Hon Dr. Derby University, 2007; and Hon Dr. Loughborough University, 2017.

=== Charity work in Nepal ===
Doug Scott in Nepal in 2015.

During Scott's climbing career, his understanding of the culture and the people in the regions where he climbed grew as he formed strong bonds and relationships. In 1991 he raised the funds and organised the installation of 17 fresh-water standpipes in Askole, the last settlement before K2, that reduced infant mortality by half. He along with his wife Sharu Prabhu founded the charity Community Action Nepal (CAN), and spent much of his time fundraising for this cause and regularly visited some of the 60 CAN projects out in Nepal. Scott & Prabhu were also advocates of responsible tourism & set up Community Action Treks (CAT) in 1989 to help improve conditions of labour in the trekking industry. He received the British Guild of Travel Writers Tourism and Community Merit Award 1996, and CAT received the Responsible Tourism Award 2008. CAN was awarded the first British Expertise International (BEI) Charity Project of the Year Award along with CAN's partner, WYG, in 2017.

=== Volunteering ===
Scott held various volunteering positions within the mountaineering community. He was a member of the Hunt Committee contributing to the Hunt Report on Outdoor Education 1976. He was British Mountaineering Council (BMC) representative on the UIAA and a member of the UIAA Management Committee 2008–2012; member of UIAA Mountaineering Commission and chairman of the Traditional Values Working Group 2011 until his death. He was chairman of Mount Everest Foundation 2014–2017 and vice chairman of the Mountain Heritage Trust 2014–2017. He was an honorary member of the Climbers Club, the Alpine Club and the American Alpine Club. He was a vice president of the BMC between 1994 and 1997 and went on to become a patron of the BMC in 2015.

== Career highlights ==
Highlights of Scott's climbing career include:

- 1965: Tarso Tiroko, Tibesti mountains of Chad with Ray Gillies, Clive Davies and Pete Warrington
- 1967: South face of Koh-i-Bandaka, Hindu Kush with Ray Gillies
- 1970: Salathe Wall of El Capitan with Peter Habeler
- 1972: Mount Asgard, Baffin Island with Dennis Hennek, Paul Nunn and Paul Braithwaite
- 1974: Changabang, first ascent with Bonington, Haston et al.
- 1974: Pic Lenin, Pamirs, with Clive Rowland, Guy Lee, Braithwaite
- 1975: Southwest face of Everest, with Haston
- 1976: South face Denali, Alaska, with Haston
- 1977: Baintha Brakk (more commonly known as The Ogre), Karakoram, with Bonington, and descent with both legs broken at the ankle with the selfless help of Mo Anthoine and Clive Rowland
- 1978: Mount Waddington, Canada, with Rob Wood
- 1979: North ridge of Kangchenjunga, with Peter Boardman and Joe Tasker.
- 1979: Nuptse, North face, Nepal, with Georges Bettembourg, Brian Hall and Alan Rouse
- 1981: Shivling, India, with Bettembourg, Greg Child and Rick White
- 1982: Shishapangma, Tibet, south face, with Alex MacIntyre and Roger Baxter-Jones
- 1983: Lobsang Spire, Karakoram, with Child and Peter Thexton
- 1984: Chamlang, East ridge, Nepal, with Michael Scott, Jean Afanassieff and Ang Phurba
- 1988: Jitchu Drake, Bhutan, with Sharavati Prabhu and Victor Saunders
- 1992: Nanga Parbat, Central Mazeno Peaks, with Sergey Efimov, Alan Hinkes, Ang Phurba and Nga Temba.
- 1998: Drohmo, South pillar, Nepal, with Roger Mear
- 2000: Targo Ri, Central Tibet, with Julian Freeman-Attwood and Richard Cowper

== Personal life ==
In 1962 he married Janice Brook, with whom he had three children, Michael, Martha and Rosie. The marriage was dissolved in 1988. In 1993 he married Indian climber, Sharavati Prabhu, with whom he had two sons, Arran and Euan. The marriage was dissolved in 2003. In 2007 he married Patricia Lang, residing together in the Northern Fells of the Lake District.

In March 2020, Scott was diagnosed with inoperable cerebral lymphoma. He died at his home in Cumbria, England of the disease on 7 December 2020, aged 79.

== Books ==
He authored:

- Doug Scott, Big Wall Climbing, (1981) ISBN 0-7182-0967-2
- Doug Scott and Alex MacIntyre, The Shishapangma Expedition, (1984) ISBN 0-89886-723-1
- Doug Scott, Himalayan Climber: A Lifetime's Quest to the World's Greater Ranges, (1992, Diadem) ISBN 1-898573-16-6
- Doug Scott, Up and About, The Hard Road to Everest (2015) ISBN 978-1-910240-41-0
- Doug Scott, The Ogre (2017) ISBN 978-1-911342-79-3
- Doug Scott, Kangchenjunga (2021) ISBN 978-1-912560-19-6

He contributed to:

- Everest the Hard Way (Chris Bonington, 1976) ISBN 0-340-20833-3
- Great Climbs (Chris Bonington, 1994) ISBN 9781857325744
- General editor of Philip's Guide to Mountains (Philip's, 2005) ISBN 978-0540085798
- Himalaya: The exploration and conquest of the greatest mountains on earth (Phillip Parker, 2013) ISBN 978-1-844862-21-4
- Changabang Published 1975 by Heinemann. ISBN 0-435-86001-1

== See also ==
- List of 20th-century summiters of Mount Everest
