= Joe Brown (climber) =

English mountaineer and rock climber (1930–2020)

Joe Brown CBE
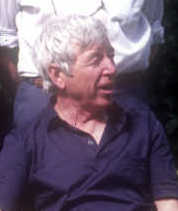
- Brown in the 1990s
- Born: 26 September 1930; Ardwick, Manchester, England
- Died: 15 April 2020 (aged 89); Llanberis, Wales
- Other names: The Master, The Human Fly
- Occupation: Mountain climber
- Known for: First ascent of Kanchenjunga
- Spouse: Valerie Melville Gray
- Children: Helen and Zoe
- Awards: MBE, CBE

Joseph Brown CBE (26 September 1930 – 15 April 2020) was an English mountaineer who was regarded as an outstanding pioneer of rock climbing during the 1950s and early 1960s. Together with his early climbing partner, Don Whillans, he was one of a new breed of British post-war climbers who came from working class backgrounds in contrast to the upper and middle class professionals who had dominated the sport up to the Second World War. He became the first person to climb the third-highest mountain in the world when he was on the 1955 British Kangchenjunga expedition. Some of his climbs were televised and he assisted with mountaineering scenes in several films; Brown died on 15 April 2020 at the age of 89.

== Early life ==
Brown was born the seventh and last child of a family in Ardwick, Manchester, England. His father was a builder and merchant seaman who died in 1931 when Brown was eight months old. Brown's mother was forced to take in washing before she began work as a cleaner. In his autobiography, The Hard Years, Brown remembered being banned from the Scouts for refusing to go on a church parade and recalled how he began exploring the countryside: camping out, playing and climbing in old quarries. At around the age of 16 he came to Kinder Downfall and, having read Colin Kirkus' Let's Go Climbing, he decided to begin climbing. He reputedly borrowed his mother's old washing line to use as a rope, but Brown himself explained that, in fact, he stole rope that had been placed around roadworks.

After leaving school he trained as an apprentice plumber and general builder, working for a plumber and general builder called Archie. In 1949–50, he was conscripted for 18 months in the Royal Army Ordnance Corps, where he spent his free time climbing with friends. Brown broke his leg in three places in a scrum for the tea urn but was back up and climbing three months later.

== Climbing career ==
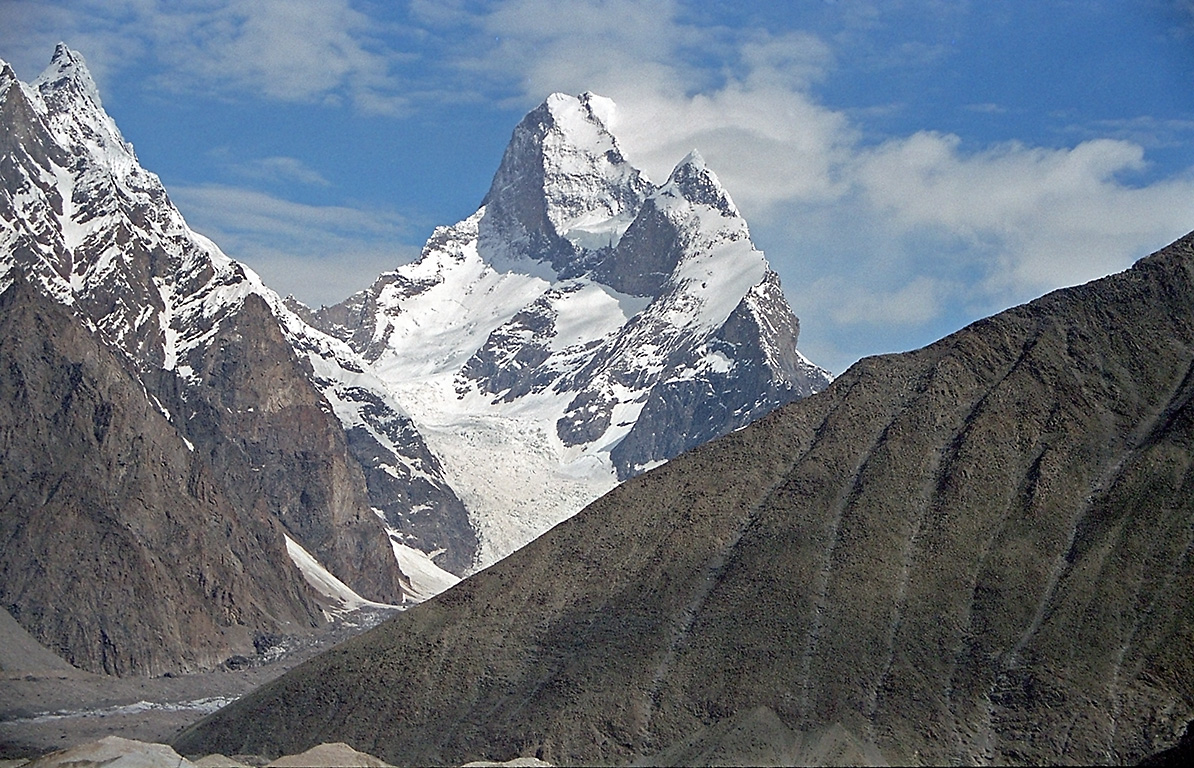
In 1956 Brown and Ian McNaught-Davis made the first ascent of the west summit of the Muztagh Tower

Brown, who was known as "The Master" and "The Human Fly", became famous for climbing during the 1950s. He was a member of the Valkyrie Climbing Club and founding member of the Rock and Ice Club. In Hard Rock, Ken Wilson said of Brown: "The reader may gain some idea of his ability by studying those of his climbs featured in this book. He has brought to climbing a rare combination of attributes: keenness, patience, strength, technical ability, eye for a line, competitiveness and, above all, a subtle and mysterious charisma. Few would deny that his place in British rock climbing remains pre-eminent." Reviewing Brown's autobiography The Hard Years in 1967, the climber A. B. Hargreaves said: "This is a remarkable book by a remarkable man. As for the man, the hard man, the climber, his achievements both in rock climbing and mountaineering have been very great. In twenty years he has become a legend".

An early climbing partner was Don Whillans, from the neighbouring city of Salford. They were among the first of a new breed of post-war climbers from working class backgrounds, in contrast to the upper and middle class professionals who had dominated the sport up to the Second World War. So famous was he that the Post Office delivered a letter to him simply addressed "The Human Fly, UK".

Brown established a number of new routes in Snowdonia and the Peak District that were at the leading edge of the hardest grades. Examples on Dinas Cromlech in the Llanberis Pass include "Cenotaph Corner" (1952, graded E1, with Doug Belshaw) and "Cemetery Gates" (1951, E1, with Don Whillans).

Brown's mountaineering achievements in the Alps and Himalayas included many ascents in the 1950s with Whillans and other members of the Rock and Ice climbing club and, in 1955, the first ascent of the world's third-highest mountain, Kangchenjunga in the Nepalese Himalayas, with George Band. In 1956 he made the first ascent of the west summit of the Muztagh Tower in the Karakoram with Ian McNaught-Davis. The other members of the team, John Hartog and Tom Patey, reached the main summit the next day.

Joe Brown Climbing Shops

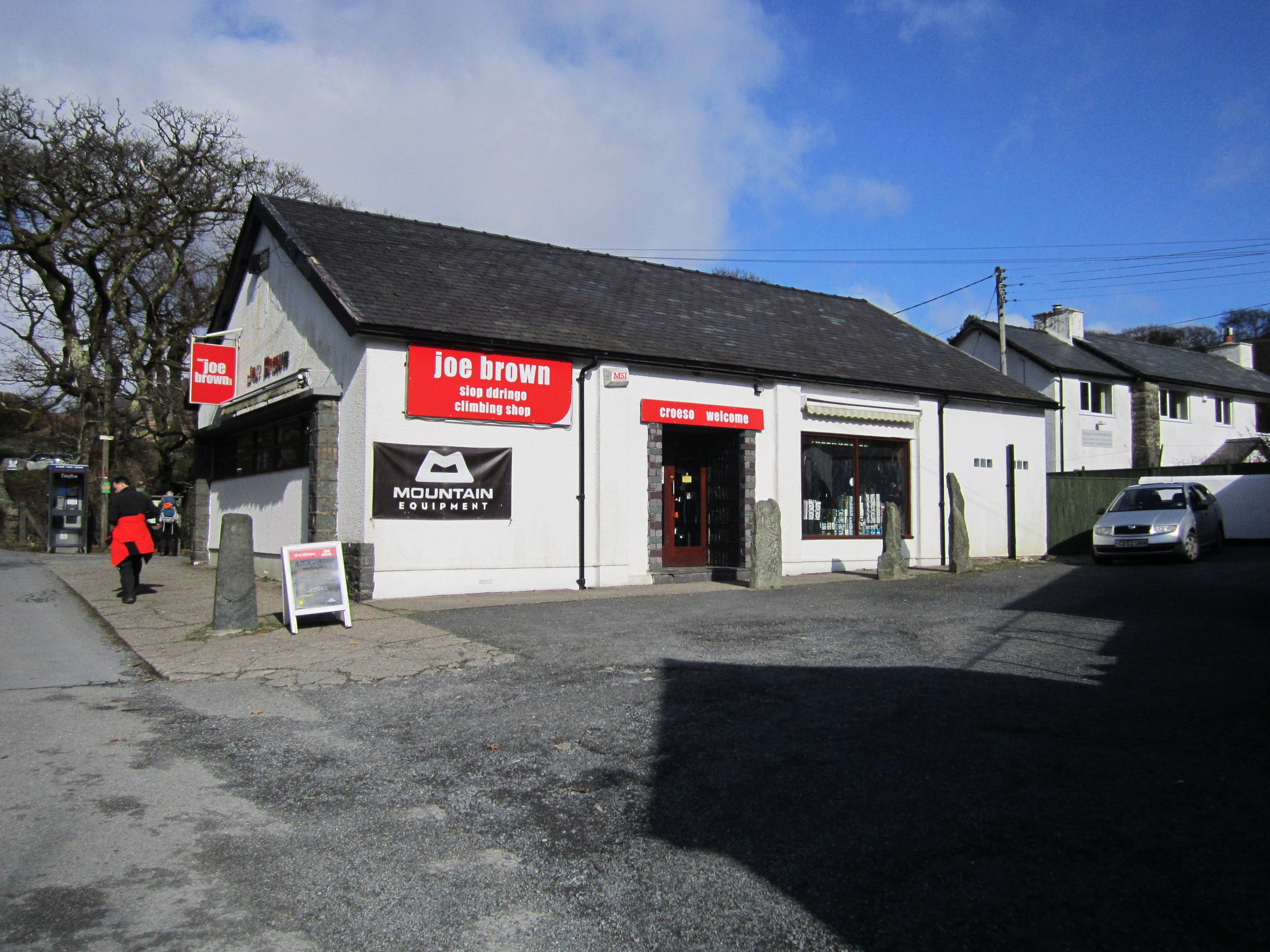
Capel Curig

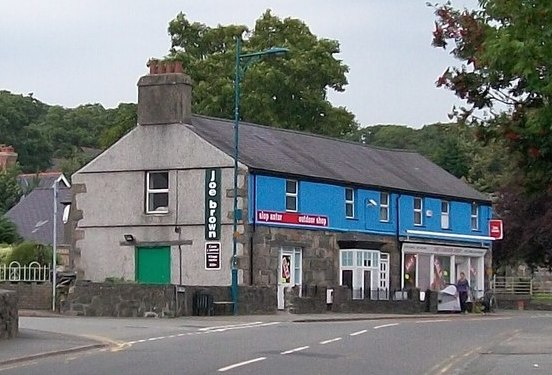
Llanberis

As well as creating pioneering routes, he helped create new types of "protection" to improve safety on climbs, and is acknowledged to have created some of the first "nuts" by drilling the thread out of engineering nuts and threading the centre with a sling. He started to create and improve climbing gear and in 1966 opened a shop, since expanded to three shops in Snowdonia and an online store.

== Personal life ==
On 17 February 1957, Brown married Valerie Melville Gray. They had two daughters.

On 15 April 2020, Brown died at his home in Llanberis, aged 89.

== Honours ==
Brown was appointed a Member of the Order of the British Empire (MBE) and in 2011 was made a Commander of the Order of the British Empire (CBE) in the New Year's Honours List for services to rock climbing and mountaineering. Upon receiving the CBE, the BBC reported him as saying: "Receiving the CBE is so strange, because it's like I'm being awarded for enjoying myself".

== In the media ==
Throughout his climbing career Brown was involved in films such as Hazard, Upside Down Wales, Five Days One Summer, in which he and other British climbers assisted with the mountaineering scenes. In 1986 he was the stunt double for Robert De Niro during the climbing scenes in The Mission.

Brown is remembered for televised rock climbs in the 1960s, three in Snowdonia, and in 1967, a spectacular new route on the Old Man of Hoy, a Scottish sea stack, with Ian McNaught-Davis and Chris Bonington, which was broadcast live by the BBC. In 1984 Brown repeated the climb of the Old Man in a television documentary.

In his 2010 book Unjustifiable Risk?: The Story of British Climbing, Simon Thompson, says of Brown: "Joe Brown is regarded by many as the finest British climber of the twentieth century".

== Bibliography ==
- Brown, Joe (1967). The Hard Years. London: Victor Gollancz. OCLC 752708655.
