= Naudanda =

Naudanda नौडाँडा
- City
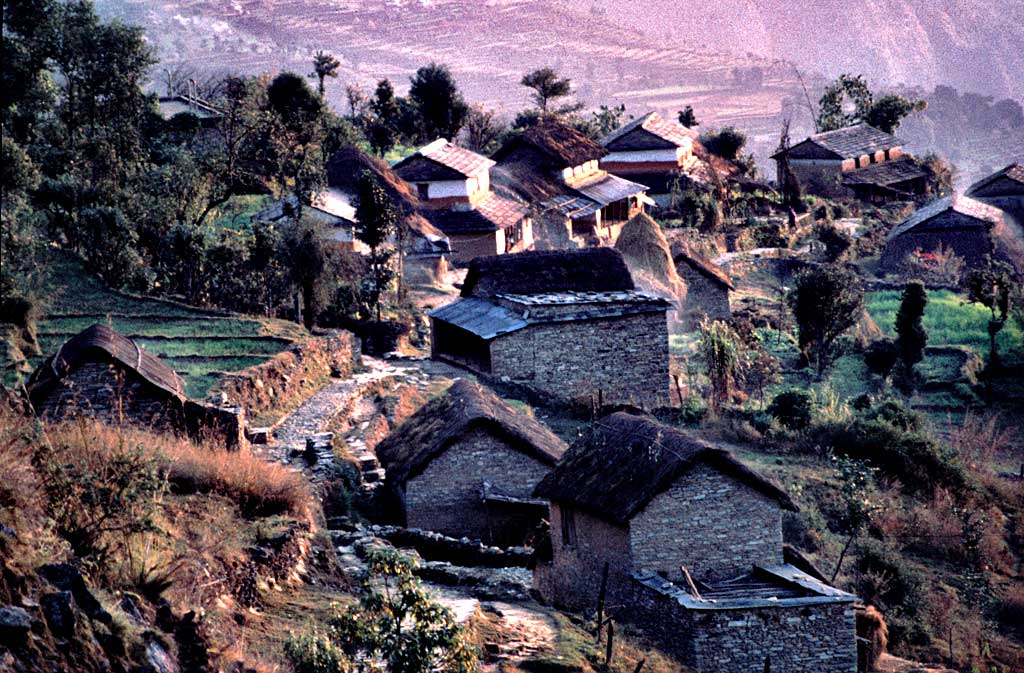

- Location in Kaski, Nepal Naudanda (Nepal)
- Coordinates: 28°18′54″N 83°50′45″E
- Country: Nepal
- Zone: Gandaki Zone
- District: Kaski District
- Time zone: UTC+5:45 (Nepal Time)
- Postal code: 33711
- Area code: 061

Naudanda is a village in Kaski District in the Gandaki Zone of northern-central Nepal. There are views of the Annapurna Range from this area of Pokhara, Nepal. It is on the way to Sarangkot, the world's 5th paragliding spot 6 km away from Pokhara.

Tourists visit here for recreation and the natural environment. This location is famous for its view of the Annapurna range on one side and Phewa lake and Pokhara city on the other. It is at the altitude of 1,443 meters above sea level. Naudada is also a popular destination for birdwatchers. It is one of the best areas for vultures in the country, including Himalayan Griffons, and Red-headed and Eurasian Black Vultures.
