= Dougal Haston =

British mountain climber (1940–1977)

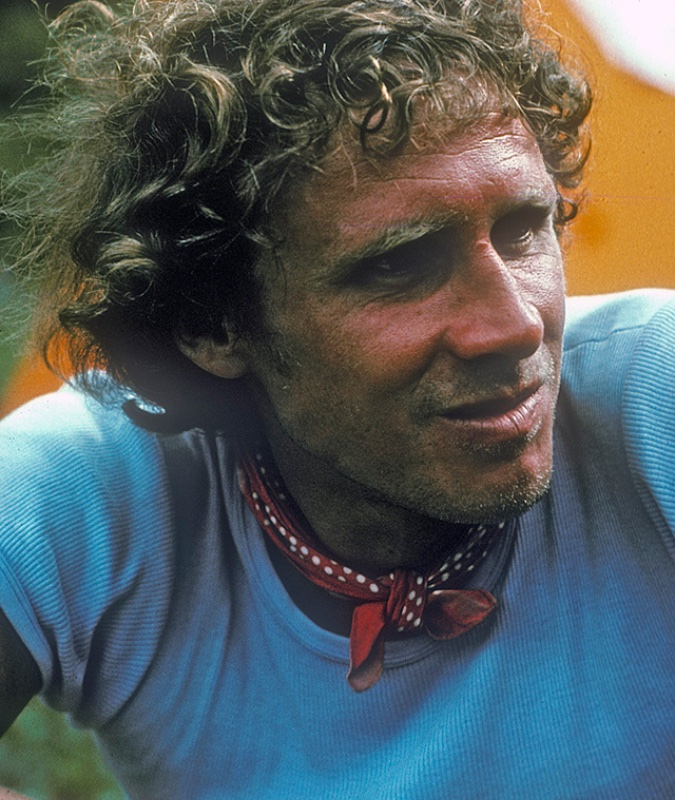
- Haston in 1975
- Born: 19 April 1940; Currie, Midlothian, Scotland
- Died: 17 January 1977 (aged 36); Leysin, Vaud, Switzerland
- Occupation: Mountaineer
- Known for: The Eiger Sanction, ascents of Annapurna and Everest

Duncan "Dougal" Curdy MacSporran Haston (19 April 1940 – 17 January 1977) was a Scottish mountaineer noted for his exploits in the British Isles, Alps, and the Himalayas. From 1967 he was the director of the International School of Mountaineering at Leysin, Switzerland, a role he held until his death in an avalanche while skiing above Leysin.

== Biography ==
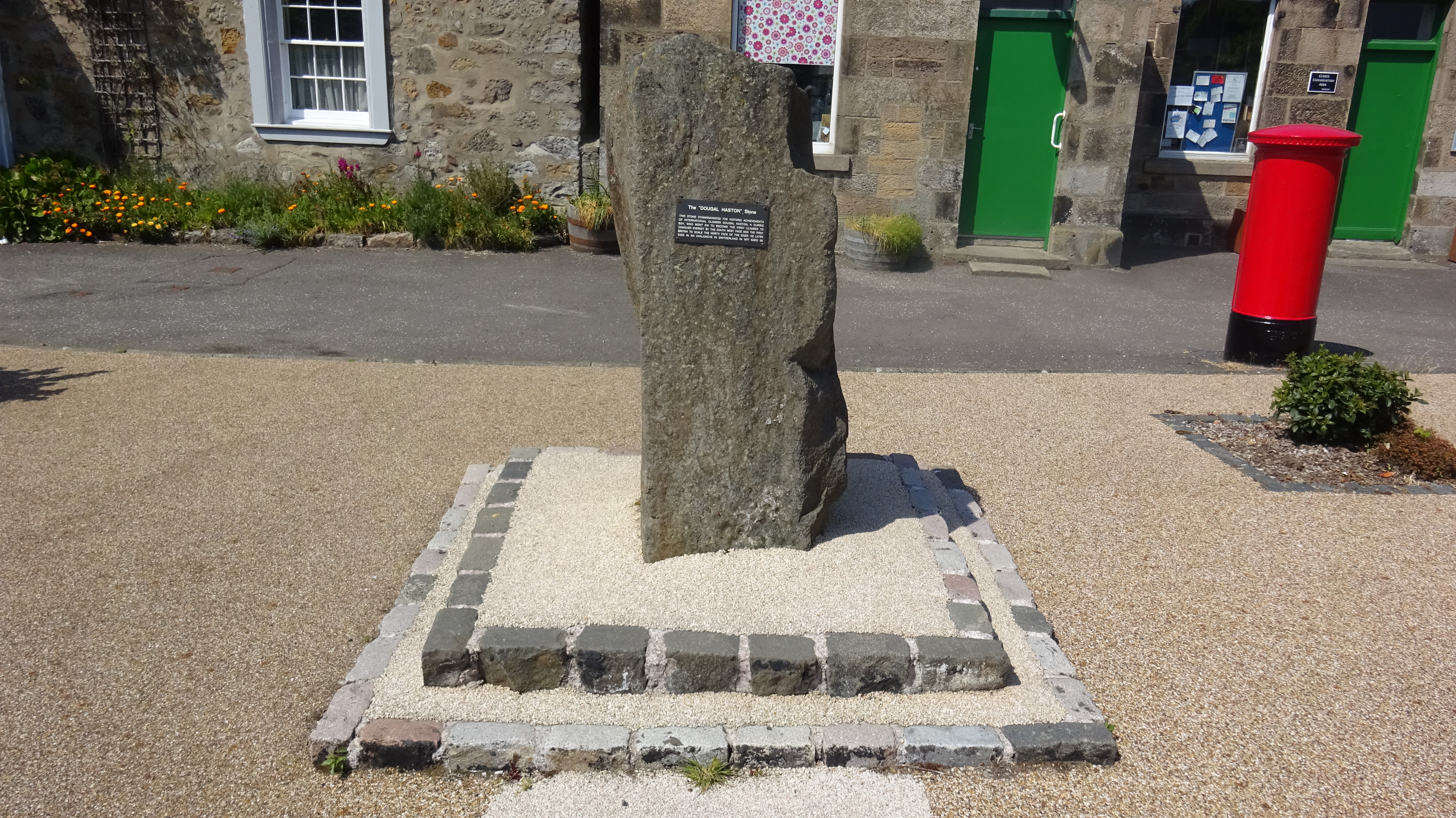
Memorial to Haston in Currie village

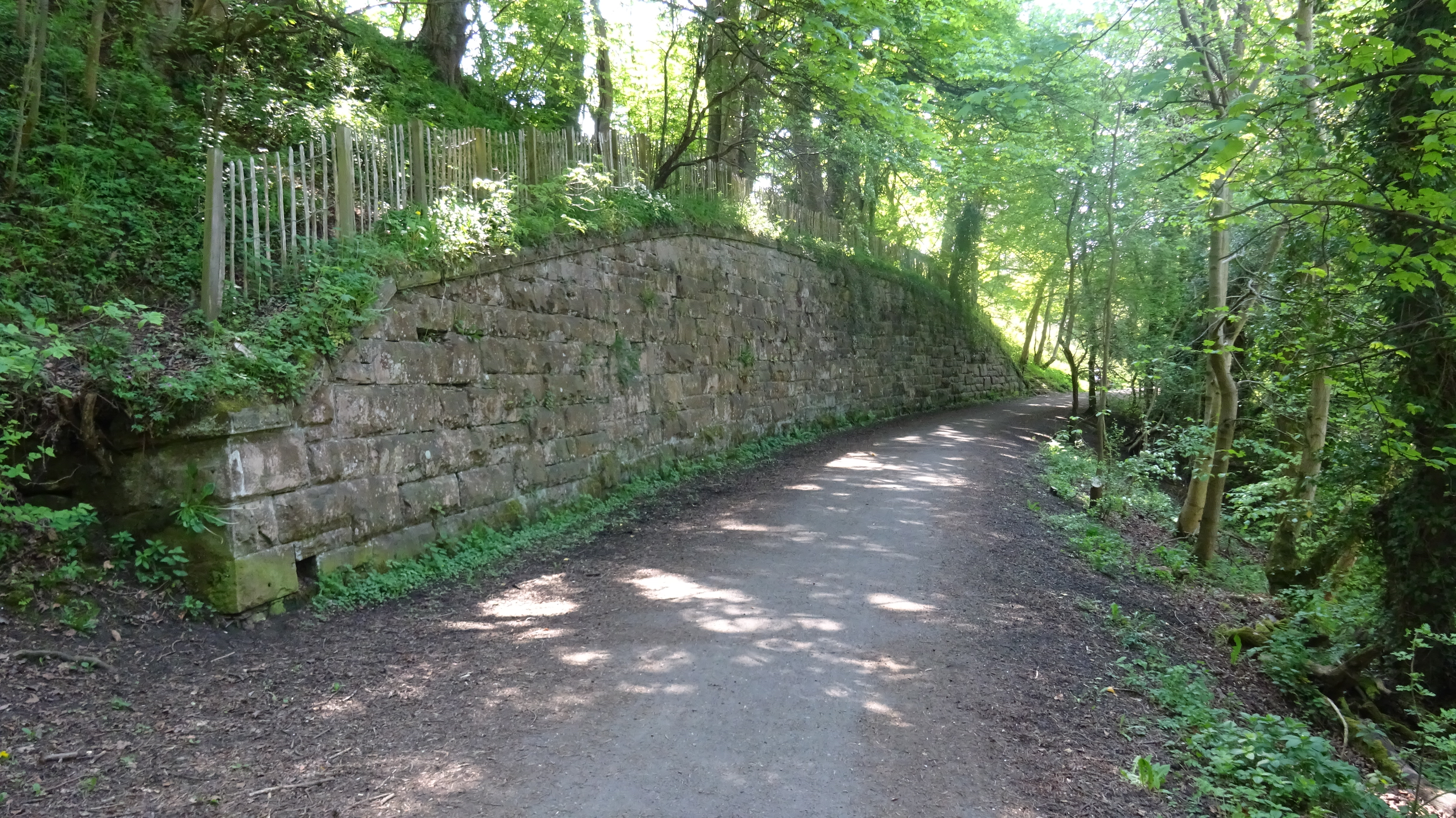
Dougal used retaining walls on the Balerno Loop Line to practice climbing.

Haston was born in Currie, on the outskirts of Edinburgh, and educated at West Calder High School. Early in his career, he climbed numerous new Scottish routes with Robin Smith. Routes such as The Bat on the Carn Dearg Buttress of Ben Nevis helped establish the pair as future stars. Smith died in an accident in 1962. In 1965, shortly before his ascent of Harlin Direct on the Eiger, Haston was sentenced to 60 days in prison having run down and killed 18-year-old student James Orr whilst driving drunk.

Haston lived on to realize his early promise. In 1970, he and Don Whillans were the first to climb the south face of Annapurna on an expedition led by Chris Bonington, and in 1975 he and Doug Scott were the first pair to summit Mount Everest by the south-west face, also led by Bonington. Haston's memorial in Currie mistakenly claims he was the first British climber to ascend the north face of the Eiger. In fact, it was done by Bonington and Ian Clough in 1962, but he made the first ascent of the Nordwand by the direttissima, or most direct route, in 1966 with Jörg Lehne, Günther Strobel, Roland Votteler and Siegfried Hupfauer. American John Harlin was killed when a rope (chosen by him over Haston's request they be thicker) broke; the route was subsequently named in Harlin's memory.

Adding guiding and instruction to his quiver, Haston became director of the International School of Mountaineering at Leysin, Switzerland, in 1967. Taking over from the founder, John Harlin, it was a position he maintained until his death in a skiing accident in 1977.

In 1975, Haston was credited as an adviser on the movie The Eiger Sanction, directed by and starring Clint Eastwood.

Haston was killed in an avalanche in January 1977 while skiing alone above Leysin on the northeast face of La Riondaz to the Col Luisset. It appeared that he had been choked by his scarf. He is buried in Leysin.

== Filmography ==
- Haston: A Life in the Mountains BBC2 2006.

== Bibliography ==
- Gillman, Peter; Haston, Dougal (1966). Eiger Direct. London: Collins.
- Haston, Dougal (1972). In High Places. London: Cassell. ISBN 0-304-29073-4.
- Haston, Dougal (1974). The Eiger. London: Cassell. ISBN 0-304-29373-3.
- Haston, Dougal (1979). Calculated Risk. London: Diadem Books. ISBN 1-898573-66-2.
- Connor, Jeff (2002). Dougal Haston: The Philosophy of Risk. Edinburgh: Canongate Books. ISBN 1-84195-215-X.

== See also ==
- List of 20th-century summiters of Mount Everest
- Alpine guides
