= Chris Bonington =

British mountaineer (born 1934)

Sir Chris Bonington CVO CBE DL
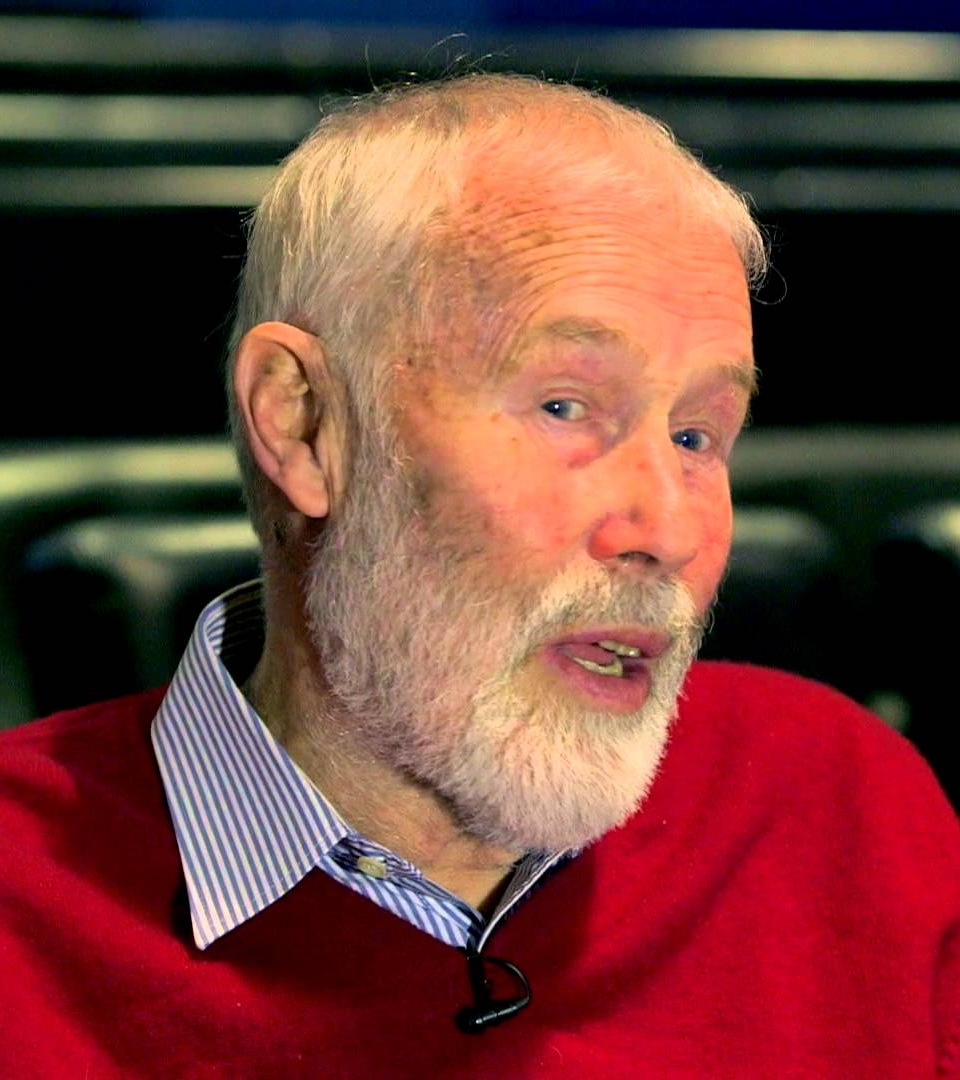

Personal information
- Full name: Christian John Storey Bonington
- Nationality: British
- Born: 6 August 1934 (age 92) Hampstead, London, England
- Spouses: Wendy Bonington (m. 1962; died 2014) Loreto Herman (m. 2016)
- Children: Conrad (died 1966); Daniel (b. 1967); Rupert (b. 1969)

Climbing career
- Type of climber: Expedition climbing; Alpine climbing; Big wall climbing; Traditional climbing
- Major ascents: Annapurna II (1960); Nuptse (1961); North Wall of the Eiger (1962); Old Man of Hoy (1966); Changabang (1975); Baintha Brakk/Ogre (1977); Kongur (1981); Mount Everest (1985)

Sir Christian John Storey Bonington, CVO, CBE, DL (born 6 August 1934) is a British mountaineer whose career has included nineteen expeditions to the Himalayas, including four to Mount Everest.

== Early life and expeditions ==
Bonington's father, who left the family when Christian was nine months old, went on to become a founding member of L Detachment, Special Air Service. Bonington first began climbing in 1951 at age 16. Educated at University College School in Hampstead, Bonington joined the Royal Fusiliers before attending Royal Military Academy Sandhurst, and on graduation was commissioned in the Royal Tank Regiment in 1956. After serving three years in North Germany, he spent two years at the Army Outward Bound School as a mountaineering instructor.

Bonington was part of the party that made the first British ascent of the South West Pillar (aka Bonatti Pillar) of the Aiguille du Dru in 1958, and the first ascent of the Central Pillar of Freney on the south side of Mont Blanc in 1961 with Don Whillans, Ian Clough and Jan Dlugosz (Poland). In 1960 he was part of the successful joint British-Indian-Nepalese forces expedition to Annapurna II.

On leaving the British Army in 1961, he joined Van den Berghs, a division of Unilever, but he left after nine months, and became a professional mountaineer and explorer. In 1966 he was given his first assignment by The Daily Telegraph Magazine to cover other expeditions, including climbing Sangay in Ecuador and hunting caribou with Inuit on Baffin Island. In 1968 he accompanied Captain John Blashford-Snell and his British Army team in the attempt to make the first-ever descent of the Blue Nile.

In 1972 he was unsuccessful on the southwest face of Mount Everest, but reached 27,300 feet (8,300 m). He had another shot at that route in 1975, and the 1975 British Mount Everest Southwest Face expedition that he led was successful—it put four climbers on the summit, but Mick Burke died during his summit attempt.

== Writing ==
Bonington has written or edited numerous books, made many television appearances, and received many honours, including the chancellorship of Lancaster University from 2005 to 2014. He is honorary president of the Hiking Club and Lancaster University Mountaineering Club and has a boat named after him among Lancaster University Boat Club's fleet. Furthermore, he is the Honorary President of the British Orienteering Federation. He has lived in Cumbria since 1974. He is a patron, and former president (1988–91), of the British Mountaineering Council (BMC). He succeeded Edmund Hillary as the Honorary President of Mountain Wilderness, an international NGO dedicated to the preservation of mountain areas, in their natural and cultural aspects.

== Personal life ==
Bonington's first wife was Wendy, a freelance illustrator of children's books. The couple had three children: Conrad (died 1966), Daniel, and Rupert. The family lived at Caldbeck, Cumbria. Wendy Bonington died on 24 July 2014 from motor neuron disease (MND), inspiring Bonington to support MND research. On his 80th birthday, he made an ascent of the Old Man of Hoy to raise funds for this purpose.

On Saturday 23 April 2016, Bonington married Loreto McNaught-Davis, the widow of mountaineer and television presenter Ian McNaught-Davis, who had died in February 2014. The ceremony took place in London in the presence of about sixty friends and family.

== Tributes ==
In 1974 Bonington received the Founder's Medal of the Royal Geographical Society. In 1985 he received the Lawrence of Arabia Memorial Medal of the Royal Society for Asian Affairs. St Helen's School, Northwood, England has named one of its four houses after him. Bonington was presented with the Golden Eagle Award for services to the outdoors in 2008 by the Outdoor Writers and Photographers Guild.

== Honours ==
Bonington was appointed Commander of the Order of the British Empire (CBE) in the 1976 New Year Honours "for services to Mountaineering", in recognition of the previous year's successful ascent of Everest and was knighted in the 1996 New Year Honours, again for his services to the sport. He was appointed Commander of the Royal Victorian Order (CVO) in the 2010 Birthday Honours for his services to the Outward Bound Trust. He was appointed as a Deputy Lieutenant of Cumbria in 2004. In 2015, Bonington was awarded the 7th Piolet d'Or Lifetime Achievement Award.

== Notable climbs ==
- 1960 Annapurna II (First ascent) with Richard Grant and Sherpa Ang Nyima
- 1961 Central Pillar of Freney, Mont Blanc (First ascent) with Ian Clough, Don Whillans and Jan Długosz
- 1962 North Wall of the Eiger (First British ascent) with Ian Clough
- 1963 Central Tower of Paine, Patagonia (First ascent) with Don Whillans
- 1964 Cime de l'Est NE Ridge, Dents du Midi, (First ascent) with John Harlin and Rusty Baillie
- 1965 Coronation Street, Cheddar Gorge (First ascent)
- 1966 Old Man of Hoy (First ascent) with Tom Patey
- 1973 Brammah (6,411 metres (21,033 ft) (First ascent) with Nick Estcourt
- 1974 Changabang, Garhwal Himalaya (6,864 metres (22,520 ft) (First ascent) with Don Whillans, Doug Scott and Dougal Haston
- 1975 Southwest face of Mount Everest (8,848 metres (29,029 ft)
- 1977 Baintha Brakk (7,285 metres (23,901 ft) (First ascent) with Doug Scott
- 1981 Kongur Tagh (7,719 metres (25,325 ft) (First ascent) with Joe Tasker, Al Rouse and Pete Boardman
- 1983 West Summit of Shivling, Gangotri (6,501 metres (21,329 ft) (First Ascent)
- 1983 Vinson Massif (4,897 metres (16,066 ft) (First British ascent – solo)
- 1985 Mount Everest as member of Norwegian Everest Expedition
- 1987 Menlungtse (7,181 metres (23,560 ft) attempted FA of main peak via South Buttress, to 6100 metres; 20,013'; w/ Odd Eliason, Bjorn Myrer-Lund, Torgeir Fosse, Helge Ringdal (all Norwegian) and Jim Fotheringham (UK).
- 1988 Menlungtse West (7,023 metres (23,041 ft) FA via West Ridge, (expedition leader). Summit attained by Andy Fanshawe and Alan Hinkes (both UK), with David Breashears and Steve Shea (both USA) in support.
- 1995 Drangnag Ri (6,801 metres (22,313 ft) (First ascent) with Ralph Høibakk, Pema Dorje Sherpa, Bjørn Myrer Lund
- 2014 The Old Man of Hoy (137 metres (449 ft) to mark his 80th birthday and to raise funds for motor neuron disease charities

== Expedition leader ==
- 1970 British Annapurna South Face expedition, successful, summit reached by Dougal Haston and Don Whillans; death of Ian Clough
- 1972 Mount Everest, (south-west face), unsuccessful
- 1975 British Mount Everest Southwest Face expedition, successful, summit reached by Doug Scott, Dougal Haston, Peter Boardman, Pertemba Sherpa and Mick Burke; death of Burke
- 1978 K2 (west face), unsuccessful; death of Nick Estcourt
- 1982 Mount Everest (north-east ridge), unsuccessful; death of Peter Boardman and Joe Tasker

Although expedition leader, Bonington did not reach the summit of these peaks on these expeditions

== Mount Everest record ==
Bonington briefly became the oldest person to summit Mount Everest in April 1985, at the age of 50. He was surpassed by Richard Bass of Seven Summits fame, who summited later that same season at 55. The record has been surpassed many times since.

== Bibliography ==
- I Chose to Climb (Gollancz) 1966
- Annapurna South Face (Cassell) 1971
- The Next Horizon (Gollancz) 1973
- Everest South West Face (Hodder and Stoughton) 1973
- Changabang (Heinemann) 1975
- Everest the Hard Way (Hodder and Stoughton) 1976
- Quest for Adventure (Hodder and Stoughton) 1981
- Kongur: China's Elusive Summit (Hodder and Stoughton) 1982
- Everest: The Unclimbed Ridge (with Dr Charles Clarke) (Hodder and Stoughton) 1983
- The Everest Years (Hodder and Stoughton) 1986
- Mountaineer: Thirty Years of Climbing on the World's Great Peaks (Diadem) 1989
- The Climbers (BBC Books and Hodder and Stoughton) 1992
- Sea, Ice and Rock (with Robin Knox-Johnston) (Hodder and Stoughton) 1992
- Great Climbs (Ed with Audrey Salkeld) (Reed Illustrated Books) 1994
- Tibet's Secret Mountain, the Triumph of Sepu Kangri (with Dr Charles Clarke) (Weidenfeld & Nicolson) 1999
- Boundless Horizons (Weidenfeld & Nicolson) 2000
- Chris Bonington's Everest (Weidenfeld & Nicolson) 2002
- Chris Bonington's Lakeland Heritage (with Roly Smith) (Halsgrove) 2004
- Chris Bonington Mountaineer (Vertebrate Publishing) 2016
- Ascent (Simon & Schuster UK) 2017

== See also ==
- Rock climbing
- Ice climbing
- List of Mount Everest records
- List of Mount Everest summiters by number of times to the summit
