= Rock and Ice Club =

English climbing club

The Rock and Ice Club was an English climbing club formed by a group of Manchester climbers. The group regularly climbed on the weekends and met in the week to discuss the past weekends climbs and plan their future trips.

This loose group crystallised on 26 September 1951 with founding members Nat Allen, Doug Belshaw, Joe Brown, Don Chapman, Don Cowan, Jack Gill, Pete Greenall, Ray Greenall, Ron Moseley, Merrick (Slim) Sorrell, (Instructor Ullswater Outward Bound School) Dick White, Don Whillans.

Notables amongst these founders (in particular Don Whillans and Joe Brown) were at the forefront of British climbing at their time. They were the first British climbers to compete on equal terms with continental alpinists since before the First World War.
