= Don Whillans =

English rock climber and mountaineer (1933-1985)

Personal information
- Nationality: English
- Born: 18 May 1933 Salford, Lancashire, England
- Died: 4 August 1985 (aged 52)

Climbing career
- Type of climber: Traditional climbing; Alpine climbing; Expedition climbing
- Highest grade: E4 6a
- First ascents: Goliath (1958, E4 6a)

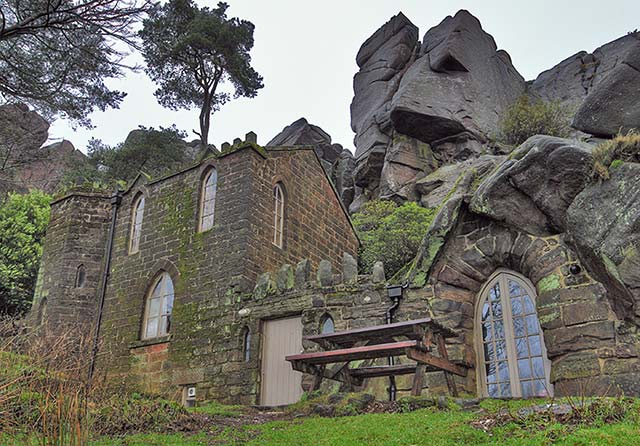
Rockhall Cottage, the Don Whillans Memorial Hut at the Roaches

Donald Desbrow Whillans (18 May 1933 – 4 August 1985) was an English rock climber and mountaineer. He climbed with Joe Brown and Chris Bonington.

== Early life ==
Born in Salford, Lancashire, Whillans began hiking at a young age on the Pennine moors while at Broughton modern school.

== Climbing career ==
Whillans was an apprentice plumber when he started his climbing career with Joe Brown in 1951. Whillans met Brown while climbing at the Roaches in Staffordshire. When Brown's climbing partner failed to follow him up a new route, Whillans asked if he could try—and subsequently led the second pitch of Brown's new route, which became known as "Matinee".

From rock climbing he expanded into mountaineering with trips to the Alps where ascents included the "Bonatti Pillar" of the Dru and the first ascent with Chris Bonington, Jan Długosz and Ian Clough of the Central Pillar of Freney on Mont Blanc.

In 1957 he made his first visit to the greater ranges on an expedition to Masherbrum (7,821 m; 25,659 ft) in the Karakoram. The expedition was unsuccessful: Bob Downes died on the mountain and the highest point reached by the team was about 200 m (660 ft) below the summit. Other more successful expeditions followed: in 1962 with Bonington he made the first ascent of the Central Torres del Paine in Patagonia, and with Dougal Haston he made the first ascent of the south face of Annapurna in Bonington's 1970 expedition. These experiences led to his participation on two international expeditions to Everest, the first being in 1971, led by Norman Dyhrenfurth, and then the second in 1972 led by Karl Herrligkoffer.

Whillans was attributed with safety and mountain awareness, as evidenced by his retreat from the Eiger North Face on several occasions because of bad weather or rockfall. He had few climbing accidents but there were near misses, such as when a fixed rope on the Central Torres del Paine snapped and he managed to put his weight on the holds with split-second timing before retying the rope.

=== Personality ===
Whillans participated in the 1971 International Expedition and 1972 European Everest Expedition, each attempting to climb Mount Everest's southwest face. The latter expedition was plagued with personality conflicts and the withdrawal of many climbers. While in camp, other climbers overheard news that England had lost a football match to Germany. "It seems we have beaten you at your national sport", said a German. After a pause Whillans replied, "Aye, and we've beaten you at yours...twice."

Whillans was a heavy drinker, which harmed his career after the expedition to Annapurna and may have contributed to his early death. Although he was only 5 ft 4 in (1.63 m) tall, he had a reputation as a brawler and stories of his prowess circulated.

He designed mountaineering equipment, including the "Whillans Harness", once described as designed to safely transport beer-guts to great height, and the "Whillans-box" expedition tent.

== Death ==
He died at the age of 52 of a heart attack.

== Legacy ==
The British Mountaineering Council maintain a climbing hut near the Roaches in memory of Whillans.

Whillans is the subject of a biography titled The Villain by the author–climber Jim Perrin in 2005.
