= Sickle Moon =

Sickle Moon may refer to:

- The crescent shape or lunar phase
- Sickle Moon Peak
