= The Griffin, Bowdon =

Listed pub in Greater Manchester, England

The Griffin
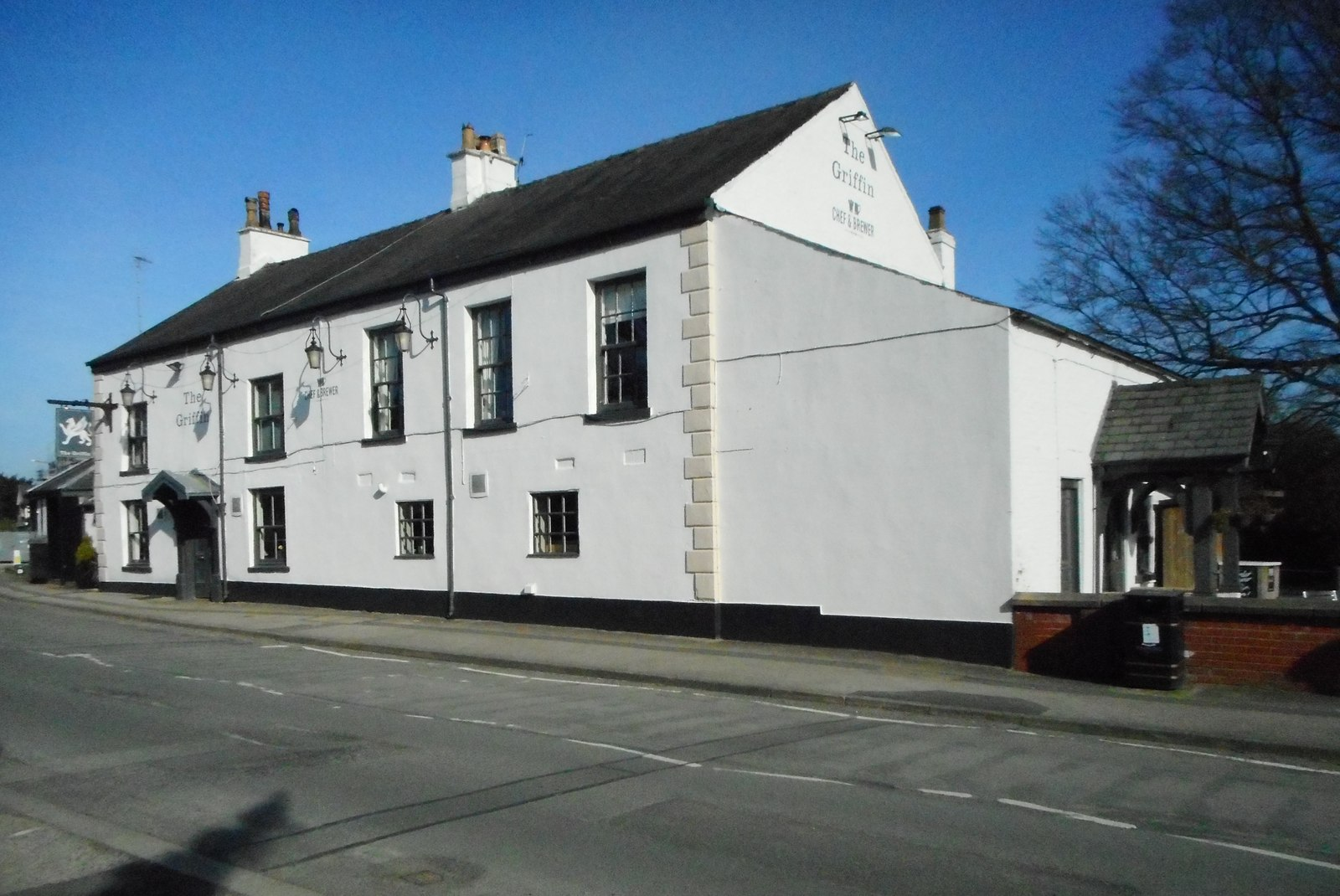
- The pub in 2017

- Location within Greater Manchester
- Alternative names: Griffin Hotel

General information
- Type: Public house
- Location: Stamford Road, Bowdon, Greater Manchester, England
- Coordinates: 53.3781°N 2.3634°W
- Year built: Late 18th century
- Renovated: 19th century (added)
- Owner: Greene King

Design and construction
- Designations

Listed Building – Grade II
- Official name: The Griffin
- Designated: 12 July 1985
- Reference no.: 1338520

Website
- Official website

The Griffin is a Grade II listed public house on Stamford Road in Bowdon, a village in Trafford, Greater Manchester, England. Built in the late 18th century with later 19th‑century additions, it appears on the 1877 and 1938 Ordnance Survey maps as an unnamed inn. It is owned by Greene King and operated as part of the Chef & Brewer chain.

== History ==
The building was constructed in the late 18th century, according to its official listing, with additions made in the 19th century. (Note: The South Trafford Archaeological Group refer to the building as the "Griffin Hotel" and state that it was built in the late 17th or early 18th century, with a wing added during the Georgian period.) The 1877 and 1938 Ordnance Survey maps mark the building as an inn without an attributed name.

On 12 July 1985, The Griffin was designated a Grade II listed building. As of November 2026, the pub's freehold remains with Greene King, and it is operated as part of the Chef & Brewer chain. The pub stands facing the Grade II*-listed Church of St Mary the Virgin.

== Architecture ==
The building is finished in render over brick and has a slate roof. It has two bays and a double‑depth layout, with a central doorway. Three bays were added to the right in the 19th century, along with a lean-to. The corners are picked out in stone and there is a small cornice at the eaves. The six‑panel door has a later canopy, and the windows are sash types; those in the 19th‑century addition keep their original glazing bars on the upper floor, with 20th‑century replacements below. There are two chimney stacks along the ridge.

== See also ==
- Listed buildings in Bowdon, Greater Manchester
- Listed pubs in Greater Manchester
