= Georges Bettembourg =

French mountaineer and skier

Georges Bettembourg was a French mountaineer and skier. He came from a family of climbers and guides, and is regarded as an elite alpinist who made numerous significant ascents in the French Alps, North America, the Himalayas and Karakoram including a two-man ascent of Broad Peak (1978); Kangchenjunga (descended prior to summiting) (1979); Kusum Kangguru (1979); Nuptse (1979); and Shivling (1981). He also made numerous ski descents of big mountains including Broad Peak, Makalu II and Mont Blanc.

He climbed and/or skied with other luminaries of his era including Doug Scott, Joe Tasker, Peter Boardman, Greg Child, Yannick Seigneur and Patrick Vallencant.

Bettembourg's 1981 autobiography is The White Death.

He died aged 32 on 18 August 1983 by stone fall on Aiguille Verte.
