= Denzell House =

Listed building in Bowdon, Greater Manchester, England

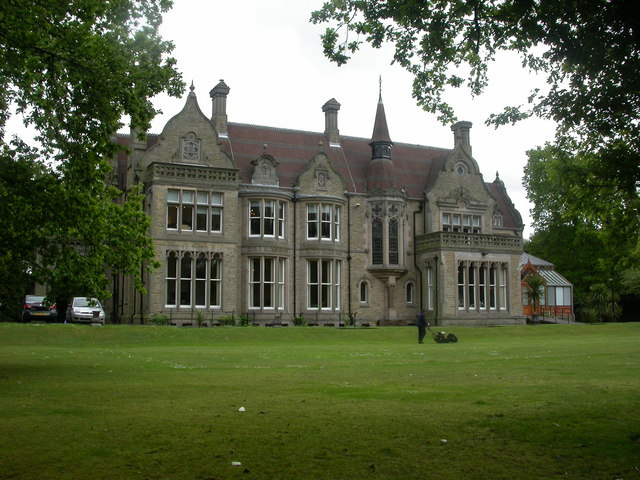
- Denzell House in 2009

- Location within Greater Manchester

General information
- Status: Converted to offices
- Architectural style: Jacobean, Gothic, and Italianate
- Location: Dunham Road, Bowdon, Greater Manchester, England
- Coordinates: 53.38250°N 2.37177°W
- Year built: 1874; 152 years ago
- Client: Robert Scott
- Owner: Trafford Council
- Landlord: Forward Property Group

Design and construction
- Architects: Clegg & Knowles

Listed Building – Grade II*
- Official name: Denzell House
- Designated: 12 July 1985
- Reference no.: 1067925

Denzell House is a Grade II* listed building on Dunham Road in Bowdon, a suburb of Altrincham, within the Metropolitan Borough of Trafford, Greater Manchester, England. Historically in Cheshire, it is noted for its Victorian architecture and historical significance. Originally built in 1874 as a private residence for textile magnate Robert Scott, the house later served as a Whitsuntide school in 1938, a wartime maternity home, and a post-war health facility before being sold in 1989 and converted into offices.

== History ==
Denzell House was built in 1874 for Robert Scott, a businessman associated with the textile firm Tootal Broadhurst Lee. Scott purchased 10 acres (4 ha) of land from the seventh Earl of Stamford for £7,075 and commissioned Manchester architects Clegg & Knowles to design the property. The house cost approximately £18,000 to build, with a further £12,000 for fittings. It was intended for Scott's son, Henry, who died before occupying it.

After Scott's death in 1904, the property was acquired by Samuel Lamb, a shipper. During Lamb's ownership, the gardens were developed with glasshouses that accommodated peaches, orchids, and vines. These greenhouses remained in use until the mid-1970s, when they were used to grow plants for local parks and flowers for civic events.

Following Lamb's death in 1936, his children gifted the house to Bowdon Urban District Council, now part of Trafford Council, in memory of their parents.

Over the years, Denzell House served a variety of roles. In 1938 it was used as a Whitsuntide weekend school, providing educational and recreational activities during the holiday period. During the Second World War, the house became an annexe to Altrincham General Hospital, functioning as a maternity home to support the increased demand for healthcare services during wartime. In the post-war years, Denzell House continued to be used by the health authority until 1989, when it was sold on a long lease and converted into offices.

On 12 July 1985, Denzell House was designated a Grade II* listed building for its architectural and historic significance.

The entrance gates, lodge, clock tower, and the archway to the stable yard were demolished at an unknown date.

Today, Denzell House remains a prominent heritage building within Denzell Gardens, a public park that preserves part of the original estate. The house is primarily used for office space.

== Architecture ==
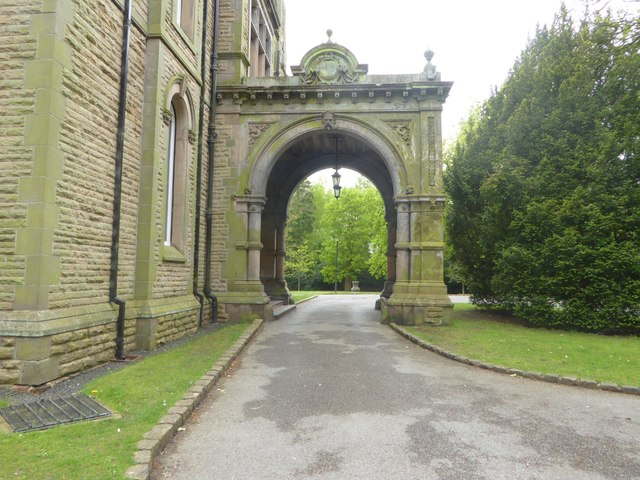
The porte-cochère at Denzell House

Denzell House incorporates elements of Jacobean, Gothic, and Italianate styles. The architectural critic Pevsner described it as "luscious" but "really very bad". Features include a stone plinth, ashlar quoins, first-floor and eaves bands, multiple gables, Tudor-style chimneys, and steeply pitched roofs with crested ridge tiles. The entrance façade is characterised by an asymmetrical porte-cochère with semi-circular arches, quatrefoil tracery, modillion eaves, and a parapet with cartouches and finials. Above it are a mullioned and transomed window, a dated cartouche (1874), and an ornate gable flanked by chimneys.

The south-west garden elevation has five bays with shaped gables to bays 1 and 5, bay windows, mullioned and transomed windows, and pierced parapets. Bays 2 and 3 feature semi-circular two-storey bays; bay 4 has an elaborate oriel with traceried lights, triangular pediments, and a conical roof rising to a spire. A recessed conservatory on the south-east replaces the original timber structure but retains the stone plinth.

The north-east elevation has four bays with shaped gables, mullioned windows, and a two-storey canted bay. A contemporary gateway and screen wall of rock-faced stone with buttresses adjoins the west side.

=== Interior ===
Internally, the house has a wide spine corridor with Tudor-arched doors and decorative tracery screens. The entrance vestibule contains encaustic tile flooring and a carved timber screen with leaded and painted glass. The entrance hall includes wooden dado panelling, a coffered ceiling, and a fireplace with a crocketed hood and a carved hunting scene. Reception rooms contain timber panelling, coffered ceilings, and marble fireplaces, some with painted or gilded overmantels and stained glass. The billiard room has a painted ceiling with scenes of games, and a carved stone fireplace. The main staircase, framed by a Tudor arch, has carved detailing and is lit by an oriel window with stained glass depicting Chaucer, Shakespeare, and Bacon. The first-floor corridor has a coffered ceiling, glazed lanterns, and decorative chimneypieces, and the rooms include marble fireplaces, moulded cornices, and stained glass. A secondary staircase leads to rooms formerly used as servants' quarters, which retain original fireplaces.

== See also ==
- Grade II* listed buildings in Greater Manchester
- Listed buildings in Bowdon, Greater Manchester
