= Paul Nunn =

English rock climber, mountaineer and economic historian (1943–1995)

Personal information
- Born: 6 January 1943 Abbeyleix, Co. Laois, Ireland
- Died: 6 August 1995 (aged 52) Haramosh II, Karakoram, Pakistan
- Occupations: rock climber, mountaineer, economic historian

Climbing career
- First ascents: Old Man of Stoer, 1966; Rangrik Rang, 6553m, 1994
- Known for: President of the British Mountaineering Council (1994-death)

Paul James Nunn (6 January 1943 – 6 August 1995) was an English mountaineer (elected president of the British Mountaineering Council in 1994), and an author and economic historian.

== Early life ==
Nunn was born in Abbeyleix, County Laois, Ireland, in 1943 but was brought up by adoptive parents in Macclesfield, Cheshire. Nunn graduated in economic history at Sheffield University and completed a Ph.D. in economic history. He spent a short spell teaching at a school in Buxton, before becoming a lecturer and then principal lecturer in economic history at Sheffield Polytechnic (now Sheffield Hallam University).

== Mountaineering career ==
He was an early member of the Alpha Mountaineering Club and later became a member of both the Climbers Club and the Alpine Club. He pioneered numerous rock climbs across the UK, particularly in Derbyshire, the English Lake District and in Scotland and quickly established his reputation by climbing a significant number of the classic hard routes in the European Alps. He pioneered a range of new climbs including over 40 first ascents on grit and 30 on limestone as well as others across the UK; more than a dozen of these new routes are now regarded as '3 star' classics, including Megaton which is featured in Extreme Rock and Emerald Gully featured in Cold Climbs. He was one of the team that first climbed the Old Man of Stoer in 1966 (with Brian Henderson, Tom Patey, and Brian Robertson).

His wide experience led him to become involved in compiling several widely used UK rock climbing guidebooks including a FRCC guidebook to Borrowdale with Oliver Woolcock, the BMC guidebook to the Peak District Northern Limestone, BMC guidebook to the Peak District Southern Limestone, a guidebook to the Kinder edges and a highly successful commercially published guidebook covering most of the Peak District which ran to several editions over the following 12 years.

He was also a leading climber on a number of major mountaineering expeditions further afield. Highlights included the Caucasus in 1970, where he joined Chris Woodhall and Hamish MacInnes on a steep new route on the north face of Pik Schurovski (4259m) and Baffin Island in 1972 (the east pillar of Mount Asgard, a new 4000-foot rock climb up on the Arctic Circle with Paul Braithwaite, Dennis Hennek and Doug Scott). He was part of an eight-man team (with Joe Tasker, Alan Rouse, John Porter, Brian Hall, Adrian Burgess, Alan Burgess, Pete Thexton) that attempted a difficult assault on the west face of Mount Everest during the winter of 1980-1981; this unsuccessful but radical attempt was recounted in Tasker's book Everest the Cruel Way. He climbed Rangrik Rang (6553m) and Manirang (6593m) in Himachal Pradesh in 1994, as well as making numerous smaller expeditions to the Karakoram of Pakistan and the Himalayas. His wide experience of mountaineering in the Greater Ranges led to him becoming a member of the UIAA Expeditions Commission in 1990s, with the role of Karakoram expert. It was whilst descending from the summit of Haramosh II (6666m, in the Karakoram Range), that he and his climbing partner Geoff Tier were lost when they were overwhelmed and buried by a massive icefall collapse in 1995.

He wrote numerous articles on mountaineering and rock climbing for publications including various climbing magazines; several are reproduced in 'At the Sharp End'. He was on the editorial team of the magazine 'Mountain' from its inception in 1969 when he was 'reviews editor', and became associate editor in 1979, a role he held until the final issue in 1992.

Paul Nunn worked as the climbing double for Sean Connery on the film Five Days One Summer which involved extensive filming of climbing sequences in the Swiss Alps. He was also involved in a number of other short films including The Bat in 1978.

The significance of his role in British climbing, its affairs and development led to his election as Vice President of the British Mountaineering Council (1986-1990 and 1993–1994) and subsequently as President in 1994, a position he would have held longer if not for his death in 1995.

== Personal life ==
Whilst a student at Sheffield University in 1963, Nunn met his future wife Hilary, with whom he had two daughters.
