= Peter Boardman =

English mountaineer

- Born: 25 December 1950; Stockport, Cheshire, England
- Died: 17 May 1982 (aged 31); North East Ridge, Mount Everest, Tibet
- Occupation: Mountaineer

Peter Boardman (25 December 1950 – 17 May 1982) was an English mountaineer and author. He is best known for a series of bold and lightweight expeditions to the Himalayas, often in partnership with Joe Tasker, and for his contribution to mountain literature. Boardman and Tasker died on the North East Ridge of Mount Everest in 1982. The Boardman Tasker Prize for Mountain Literature was established in their memory.

== Early life and education ==
Boardman was born in Stockport, Cheshire, England, the youngest son of Alan Howe Boardman (1920–1979) and Dorothy Boardman (1923–2007). He attended Stockport Grammar School from 1956 to 1969, going on school trips to Corsica in 1964 and 1965, and to the Swabian Alps in 1966. Boardman first began climbing with school friends at Windgather Rocks in the Peak District National Park. After joining the Mynydd Climbing Club in 1966, Boardman's climbing progressed quickly and he went on to climb in the Pennine Alps in 1968.

From 1969 to 1972, Boardman studied English at the University of Nottingham where he was President of the Mountaineering Club from 1971 to 1972. While at university Boardman climbed extensively in Britain and Europe and embarked on his first expedition, to Afghanistan, in 1972. After Nottingham, Boardman obtained a Postgraduate Certificate in Education (English and outdoor activities) from the University College of North Wales in 1973.

== Personal life ==
Boardman married Hilary Collins in August 1980. They first met in 1974 when Hilary attended a course at Glenmore Lodge instructed by Boardman. After the Changabang expedition in 1976 Hilary arranged for Boardman to give a slide show at Belper High School where she was the teacher responsible for outdoor activities. Soon after they began climbing together in Derbyshire and Scotland. Hilary shared Boardman's passion for mountains and they climbed together on Kilimanjaro, Mount Kenya and Carstensz Pyramid. Hilary left Britain to take up a teaching position in Switzerland where she was later joined by Boardman when he took over as Director of the International School of Mountaineering in Leysin.

== Career ==
With his postgraduate qualification, and climbing and mountaineering experience, Boardman was set on the path to becoming a professional mountaineer. In 1973, he became an instructor at Glenmore Lodge, Aviemore. He moved on to become the National Officer at the British Mountaineering Council in 1975. In 1978 Boardman took over as Director of the International School of Mountaineering in Leysin, Switzerland, after Dougal Haston's death, a position he held until his own death in 1982. Other positions and qualifications held by Boardman include:

- Mountain Guide Carnet – September 1977.
- Vice-president, British Mountaineering Council. Elected in 1979.
- President, Association of British Mountain Guides. Elected in 1979.

== Mountaineering ==
=== Europe ===
Boardman climbed extensively in Europe throughout his career. His early climbs included:

- 1970 Petit Dru, SW Pillar
- 1971 First British ascents of the North Face Direct of the Olan, WNW face of Pic Sans Nom and SW face of Aiguille de Sialouze. Boardman also climbed the north face of the Matterhorn, and met Joe Tasker and Dick Renshaw for the first time on the North Spur of the Droites.
- 1973 First British ascents of the North Face of the Nesthorn and the North Face Direct of the Lauterbrunnen Breithorn.

=== Hindu Kush, 1972 ===
Boardman's first expedition outside Europe was with fellow members of the Nottingham University Mountaineering Club who drove overland to the Hindu Kush in Afghanistan in the summer of 1972. A training climb on the North Face of Koh-i-Khaaik (5,860m) turned into an epic when the climbers underestimated the difficulty of the Face, taking longer than planned to reach the summit and necessitating a 50-mile walk back to Base Camp. Their main objective, the unclimbed North Face of Koh-i-Mondi (6,234m), was climbed relatively uneventfully. In all, expedition members climbed five new peaks and five new routes.

=== Mount Dan Beard, Alaska, 1974 ===
In May 1974, Boardman and Roger O'Donovan made the first ascent via the South Face, and the second ascent overall, of Mount Dan Beard (3,127m) in the Alaska Range. An attempt on Denali was abandoned when O'Donovan became ill.

=== Everest, South West Face, 1975 ===
When Chris Bonington was recruiting for the large, siege-style expedition to climb the South West Face of Everest, Boardman was recommended by Paul Braithwaite as a talented climber who would be compatible with other team members. The expedition was successful in placing the first two Britons, Doug Scott and Dougal Haston, on the summit on 24 September 1975. Boardman and Pertemba, the expedition's head Sirdar, reached the summit on 26 September. On their descent, they met Mick Burke a short distance below the summit and still ascending. They waited for him at the South Summit in deteriorating weather, but Burke was never seen alive again.

=== Changabang, West Wall, 1976 ===
Boardman and Joe Tasker, on their first expedition together, made the first ascent of the West Wall of Changabang (6,864m) in the Garhwal Himalaya in India. The climb took 25 days during September and October 1976. It was considered "probably the most outstanding lightweight Himalayan climb so far achieved". Changabang had been Joe Tasker's idea; he had seen it the previous year while on Dunagiri with Dick Renshaw. As Renshaw was recovering from frostbite Tasker had asked Boardman if he was interested in a new route on Changabang. Boardman had agreed readily with Tasker's proposal: "This climb would be all that I wanted. Something that would be totally committing, that would bring my self-respect into line with the public recognition I had received for Everest."

=== K2, West Ridge, 1978 ===
Boardman was invited by Chris Bonington to join an expedition to K2 (8,611m) in 1978. The team was composed of climbers Paul Braithwaite, Nick Estcourt, Doug Scott and Joe Tasker, as well as a doctor, Jim Duff, and cameraman Tony Riley. At the time, K2 had been climbed successfully only twice and the West Ridge not at all. Boardman and Tasker reached a height of approximately 6,700m, but the expedition was abandoned when Estcourt was killed in an avalanche.

=== Carstensz Pyramid, 1978 ===
In December 1978 Boardman and Hilary Collins made the first ascent of the South Face of Carstensz Pyramid (4,884m) in the Indonesian province of Papua on the island of New Guinea. In early January 1979 they climbed the nearby peak Dugundugu and, with two French climbers, traversed the three summits of Ngga Pulu.

=== Kangchenjunga, North Ridge, 1979 ===
On 16 May 1979 Boardman, together with Doug Scott and Joe Tasker, reached the summit of Kangchenjunga (8,586m) via the North Ridge. This was the third ascent overall and the first via this route. Two earlier attempts by the team (which included French mountaineer Georges Bettembourg) were thwarted by storms high on the mountain.

=== Gauri Sankar, South Summit, 1979 ===
Boardman led an Anglo-Nepalese expedition to make the first ascent of the southern summit of Gauri Sankar, a twin-peaked mountain in Nepal. The team composed of Boardman, Pemba Lama, Tim Leach and Guy Neithardt reached the South Summit (7,010m) on 9 November 1979 via the West Ridge. Fellow expedition member John Barry, who had been injured in a fall, waited at a lower camp.

=== K2, West Ridge and Abruzzi Spur, 1980 ===
Immediately after the 1978 K2 expedition, Boardman and Tasker had applied for a permit for another attempt on the mountain. In May 1980 they returned to the West Ridge with Dick Renshaw and Doug Scott. Their route avoided the avalanche-prone slope of 1978, but proved too difficult and the team, now minus Scott, turned their attention to the Abruzzi Spur, the route taken by the first ascensionists. On their second attempt on this route, they reached a height of 8,077m but their tent was overwhelmed by an avalanche in the middle of the night leading to a lengthy and precarious retreat off the mountain. A third and final attempt was abandoned due to storms on the mountain.

=== Kongur, 1981 ===
Boardman was part of the British team that made the first ascent of Kongur (7,719m), in China. The climbing team, consisting of Boardman, Chris Bonington, Al Rouse and Joe Tasker, was supplemented by cameraman, Jim Curran, and a medical team carrying out research on the effects of altitude on expedition members. The ascent was made alpine style via the southwest rib with the summit reached on the evening of 12 July 1981.

=== Everest, North East Ridge, 1982 ===
British mountaineers had last visited the north side of Everest in the 1930s. Permission for the 1982 expedition was obtained after the Chinese government began opening up mountains to foreign expeditions. The North East Ridge was "an obvious choice [...] elegant, unknown and looked, from the few photographs we had, difficult but possible." The North East Ridge rises two miles from the Raphu La (6,510m) to the North East Shoulder (8,393m) and the junction with the North Ridge. From there the summit is almost another mile away. The crux of the North East Ridge is a series of pinnacles high on the ridge before the junction with the North Ridge.

The expedition consisted of Boardman, Chris Bonington, Dick Renshaw and Joe Tasker, supported by expedition doctor Charles Clarke and Adrian Gordon, and Chinese Base Camp staff. Tasker had responsibility for filming the expedition documentary. The expedition arrived at Base Camp on 16 March 1982 and began acclimatisation forays and establishment of camps further up the Rongbuk glacier. By April the team had begun climbing on the Ridge, establishing snow caves at 6,850m and 7,256m. In early May their third and highest snow cave was established at 7,850m. While climbing on the First Pinnacle above 8,000m Renshaw experienced a minor stroke. After suffering a second stroke at Base Camp, and following medical advice, Renshaw left to return home accompanied by Clarke as far as Chengdu. By this time Bonington realised that he would be unable to go much higher on the mountain without the use of supplementary oxygen and switched to a support role. He intended to climb to the North Col with Gordon and wait there while Boardman and Tasker made a final push to cross the Three Pinnacles. Boardman and Tasker left Advance Base Camp on 15 May and reached the second snow cave the same day. By 16 May they reached the third snow cave and made what was to be their last radio contact with Bonington that evening. On 17 May they moved slowly beyond the First Pinnacle and were last seen at 9:00pm at the foot of the Second Pinnacle at 8,250m having been climbing for 14 hours. By 21 May, with no sign of Boardman and Tasker for four days, Bonington and Clarke travelled up the Kangshung Valley to search the other side of the ridge for any sign of the missing climbers, while Gordon maintained a watch at Advance Base Camp. By the beginning of June the expedition was back at Base Camp and Bonington travelled to Chengdu to break the news of the deaths to Boardman and Tasker's families.

== Posthumous events ==
News of Boardman's death was relayed to Hilary Boardman in Leysin, and Dorothy Boardman in Manchester, and covered in the media. A memorial service was held for Boardman at St George's Church in Stockport on 11 July 1982. In September 1982 Hilary Boardman and Maria Coffey, Joe Tasker's girlfriend, travelled to the north side of Everest as far as Advance Base Camp to retrace the last journey made by Boardman and Tasker.

=== Discovery of body ===
Expeditions to the North East Ridge in 1985, 1986 and 1987 failed to reach Boardman and Tasker's high point. In August 1988, Russell Brice and Harry Taylor succeeded in crossing the Pinnacles, thus completing the unclimbed section of the route, before descending via the North Ridge. They saw no sign of Boardman or Tasker due to heavy monsoon snow cover.

The next expedition on the ridge was in 1992 when a joint Japanese-Kazakh expedition crossed the Pinnacles but were unable to continue to the summit. They found a body beyond the second pinnacle at approximately 8,200m on the Rongbuk side of the ridge. Photographs taken by Vladimir Suviga and sent to Chris Bonington enabled the body to be identified, from the clothing and features, as Peter Boardman.

In 1995 the complete ridge was climbed by a Japanese expedition. They also came across a body which was initially thought to be Joe Tasker. Upon re-examining all the evidence, Chris Bonington concluded that both sightings were of Boardman: "At first it was surmised that this was Joe Tasker, but after carefully comparing the written descriptions and the photographs provided by each expedition, I became convinced that this was the same as the original sighting and therefore that of Pete."

== Writing ==
Boardman's book about the 1976 Changabang expedition, The Shining Mountain, is one of the outstanding works of mountaineering literature, and won the 1979 John Llewellyn Rhys Prize for literature. A second book, Sacred Summits, detailing his climbing exploits in 1979 on Carstensz Pyramid, Kangchenjunga and Gauri Sankar, was published posthumously.

In 1995, these books, along with those of Joe Tasker, were republished in the Boardman Tasker Omnibus.

== Commemoration ==
- The Boardman Tasker Prize for Mountain Literature was set up in 1983 by family and friends of the two climbers to honour their literary legacy.
- The Peter Boardman Climbing Wall at Stockport Grammar School was dedicated in 2008.
- In 2012, a calendar was produced for 2013 to mark the 30th anniversary of the disappearance of Boardman and Tasker.
- In 2016, The Peter Boardman Climbing wall was opened at the University of Nottingham Ningbo China to mark Boardman's contribution both as a mountaineer and as a Nottingham alumnus.

== Publications ==
=== Books ===
- The Shining Mountain: Two men on Changabang's West Wall (with material by Joe Tasker) (1978) Hodder and Stoughton, London.
- Sacred Summits: A Climber's Year (1982) Hodder and Stoughton, London.

=== Articles ===
- "The Rock Rush", Nottingham University Mountaineering Club Journal, No. 9 December 1971. pp24–28.
- "Hindu Kush – Alpine Style", Alpine Journal, 1974. p110-114.
- "Long Necks in the Hindu Kush", Mountain, No. 36, June 1974. pp15–21.
- (with R. Richards) "British Everest Expedition SW Face 1975", Alpine Journal, 1976. pp3–15.
- "Everest is not a Private Affair", Mountain Life, Dec 1975/Jan 1976.
- "Peter the Pooh", Crags, No. 4, 1976, pp8–9.
- "Changabang Commentary", Mountain, No. 55, May/June 1977. pp15–27.
- "A Westerner's Luxury", The Listener, 2 March 1978. pp266–267.
- "No More Himalayan Heroes", Climber and Rambler, November 1979. pp34–41.
- "The Untrodden Peak", The Observer Magazine, [issue to be confirmed].
- "Gauri Sankar Report", Climber and Rambler, April 1980. pp40–42.
- "So You're an Everest Climber", Mountain, No. 76. Nov/Dec 1980. pp26–29.
- "Gaurishankar, South Summit", American Alpine Journal, 1980. pp616–617.
- "The British-Nepalese Gauri Shankar Expedition, 1979", Himalayan Journal, 1979–80, Vol. 37. p15.
- "1980 K2 Expedition", American Alpine Journal, 1981. pp286–89.
- "Fight for Life on the Savage Mountain", The Observer Magazine, 15 February 1981.
- "Mount Kongur", The Observer Magazine, 15 November 1981.

== See also ==
- List of people who died climbing Mount Everest
