= Kishtwar Himalaya =

Coordinates: 33.5670°N 76.1599°E

The Kishtwar Himalaya is a small sub-mountain range of the Himalayas System, located in the states of Jammu and Kashmir and Himachal Pradesh in northwestern India.

== Geography ==
It is a dramatic range of steep rock and ice peaks with great local relief. However it is not as well known as other parts of the Himalaya since its highest peak, Bharanzar, or Sickle Moon, is only 6,574 m (21,568 ft) in elevation. One of its best-known peaks is Brammah I, 6,416 m (21,050 ft), climbed by Chris Bonington and Nick Estcourt in 1973.

The Paddar Valley is to the north of Kishtwar range in the Greater Himalayas. Formerly this valley was under the rule of Himachali kings. Legend has it that this valley was given to the king of Jammu as a dowry. A mixture of Hindu and Buddhist people live here.

== See also ==
- Mountain ranges of the Himalayas
