= Robert Scott (businessman, born 1822) =

English businessman (1822–1904

Robert Scott (1822 – 2 February 1904) was a Manchester businessman who was one of the founders of the Tootal Broadhurst Lee cotton company.

Scott was an early example of a successful manager in the textile industry, achieving significant wealth within the largest company of the time, despite being neither self-made nor from a textile family. Born the son of a farmer at Abbey Holm in Cumbria, he was working as a salesman by the time of his 1845 marriage to Maria in Cheetham Hill, north Manchester. He later became a business partner of Henry Tootal Broadhurst, Henry Lee, and Joseph Lee, who together subsequently formed Tootal Broadhurst Lee—a vertically integrated firm that was unusual for its time in combining weaving and spinning and which, by the 1880s, had become the largest cotton manufacturer in Lancashire. Henry Tootal Broadhurst's son, Edward Tootal Broadhurst, would go on to become company chairman. Scott became 'cashier', or finance director, of Tootal Broadhurst Lee in 1854 and also served as deputy chairman of the Equitable Fire and Accident Office insurance company. By the 1881 census, he was described a spinning manufacturer.

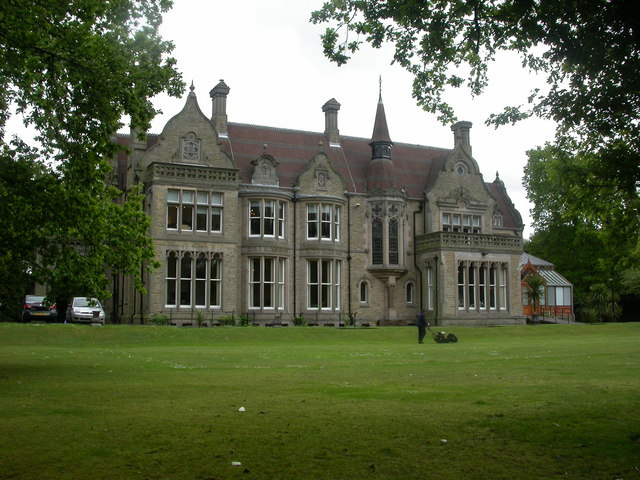
Denzell House, Scott's mansion in Bowdon

In 1874 Scott bought 10 acres (4 ha) of land in Bowdon, Cheshire, from the Earl of Stamford at a cost of £7,075 and built a large villa, Denzell, to the designs of the architects Clegg & Knowles. The house cost £18,000 to build, with a reported total expenditure of £30,000. Scott was recorded in the 1881 census as living at Denzell with his wife and a staff of nine. The building is now known as Denzell House and is Grade II* listed as a notable example of a specifically commissioned late 19th-century house for a wealthy patron, with a high degree of craftsmanship and quality of materials. The listing cites the design as inventive and eclectic, produced by a noted Manchester architectural practice; the architectural critic Pevsner described it as a luscious but "very bad" mixture of debased Jacobean, Gothic, and Italianate styles. Scott's son Henry predeceased him, and at Scott's death in 1904, the house was sold to the Lamb family.
