= Edward Tootal Broadhurst =

British businessman (1858–1922)

- Born: 19 August 1858; Broughton, near Manchester
- Died: 2 February 1922 (aged 63)
- Education: Eagle House School; Winchester College
- Spouse: Charlotte Jane Ashton

Sir Edward Tootal Broadhurst, 1st Baronet, DL, JP (19 August 1858 – 2 February 1922) was a director and eventually chairman of Tootal Broadhurst Lee, one of the largest cotton manufacturers in Manchester. He was also the chairman of the Manchester and Liverpool District Bank, and a director of the London and North Western Railway and the Atlas Insurance Company. He was High Sheriff of Lancashire in 1906–7.

== Life ==
Broadhurst was born in Broughton, near Manchester. He was the second son of Henry Tootal Broadhurst. Some relations, such as Charles Edward Broadhurst, emigrated to Australia. He was educated at Eagle House School in Wimbledon, and then at Winchester College. He started to work at the family cotton business in 1876. He married Charlotte Jane Ashton in 1887; her father was also a cotton manufacturer, Thomas Ashton; her brother was Thomas Gair Ashton, 1st Baron Ashton of Hyde.

Broadhurst's father and grandfather were both cotton manufacturers. His father joined forces with Henry Lee and Joseph Lee and Robert Scott to form a partnership that became Tootal, Broadhurst Lee Limited, which integrated cotton spinning and power loom weaving. It was the third largest vertically integrated cotton business in Lancashire, with around 5,000 employees in 1887. Its mills included Sunnyside Mill in Bolton, and Ten Acres Mill and Hemming Works near Manchester. Broadhurst's main responsibility in the company was on the finance committee of which he became chair in 1900; in 1907 he became company chairman. Broadhurst lived in the Manor House at North Rode near Congleton, and lived the lifestyle of a country gentleman, spending August and September of each year at his grouse moor in Scotland. For the rest of the year he was a dedicated businessman, though he took extended periods of leave because of nervous illness in 1910, 1912 and 1916.

Broadhurst was president of the Prestwich Conservative Association, but unlike many other Conservatives, who favoured tariffs to protect the domestic markets of British businesses, he was in favour of free trade. In early 1906, he crossed party lines to support Winston Churchill, the successful Liberal candidate for Manchester North West. Broadhurst also supported Churchill at a by-election in 1908, required after Churchill was appointed as President of the Board of Trade. The seat was won by the Conservative candidate William Joynson-Hicks, who described Broadhurst as a "Mugwump Millionaire".

Broadhurst joined the committee that organised the recruitment of the Manchester Pals battalions in the First World War, raising funds towards the cost of uniforms and equipment, and joined the Cotton Control Board in 1917. He was also involved in good works, as a governor of the Whitworth Institute, chairman of the Manchester and Salford Lifeboat Fund, and a member of the council of Manchester University. In March 1906, Broadhurst was appointed a deputy lieutenant of Lancashire. Broadhurst donated land in Moston to Manchester Corporation in 1920, as an offering of thanks to the men and women of Manchester for the work they had done in the First World War, the location becoming known as Broadhurst Park. The football ground of F.C. United of Manchester was built in the area in 2015, also called Broadhurst Park.

Escutcheon of the Broadhurst baronets of Manchester

Broadhurst was created a baronet, largely for his local war work, on 4 February 1918. The baronetcy became extinct upon his death as he and his wife had no children. He left an estate of £149, 903.

== See also ==
- Warehouse and offices at the Tootal, Broadhurst and Lee Building, Manchester

== Sources ==
- "Who Was Who 1920–2008". A & C Black. December 2007.

Honorary titles
Preceded by Sir John OS Thursby	High Sheriff of Lancashire; 1906	Succeeded by Sir William H. Tate
Baronetage of the United Kingdom
New creation	Baronet (of Manchester); 1918–1922	Extinct
