= Joe Tasker =

British mountain climber

- On Changabang, 1976
- Born: 12 May 1948; Kingston upon Hull, England
- Died: 17 May 1982 (aged 34); The North-East Ridge, Mount Everest, Tibet
- Occupation: Mountaineer

Joe Tasker (12 May 1948 – 17 May 1982) was a British climber, active during the late 1970s and early 1980s. He died while climbing Mount Everest.

== Early life ==
Born into a Roman Catholic family in 1948, Tasker was the second of ten children and spent his early childhood in Port Clarence, Middlesbrough. The family later moved to Billingham and Joe attended Ushaw Seminary, County Durham between the ages of 13 and 20, in training to become a Catholic priest. Fascinated by The Climb Up to Hell by Jack Olsen, a book recounting harrowing tales of tragic attempts to climb the North Face of the Eiger, he started climbing in a nearby quarry in 1966.

After leaving the seminary he first worked as a dustman before studying sociology at Manchester University, where he was an enthusiastic participant in the Student Union's gypsy liaison and soup-run groups. He improved his climbing skills during this time, graduating from rock climbing in Britain to harder routes in the Alps.

== Expeditions and death ==
Tasker's first regular climbing partner was Dick Renshaw, whom he had met at university. Together they climbed the North Face of the Eiger in the winter of 1975. This was followed later that year by the first ascent of the South-East ridge of Dunagiri (7066m) in the Garhwal Himalayas. Running out of food and fuel on the descent, they were lucky to survive, although Renshaw suffered frostbite in his fingers.

His ascent in 1976 of the West Face of Changabang (6864m), which neighboured Dunagiri, saw his first partnership with Peter Boardman,. Tasker made an unsuccessful attempt on Nuptse with Doug Scott and Mike Covington in the autumn of 1977, and he and Boardman were invited to the K2 expedition led by Chris Bonington in 1978, which was abandoned after Nick Estcourt was killed in an avalanche.

A small team consisting of Tasker, Boardman, and Doug Scott made an ascent of Kangchenjunga (at 8,598 m the third highest mountain in the world) by a new route from the North-West in 1979 (with Georges Bettembourg also on the team but not making the summit); this was also the first ascent of the mountain without the use of supplementary oxygen. A second attempt on K2 in 1980 saw Tasker almost wiped out by an avalanche and was ultimately unsuccessful. In the winter of 1980–1981 Tasker was part of an eight-man team (with Alan Rouse, John Porter, Brian Hall, Adrian Burgess, Alan Burgess, Pete Thexton and Paul Nunn) attempting to make a difficult winter assault on the West Face of Mount Everest; this was unsuccessful but was recounted in Tasker's first book Everest the Cruel Way.

In 1980, Tasker met Maria Coffey, the girlfriend who would write about her grief following his death in her book Fragile Edge. In 1981, he was part of the British team which made the first ascent of Kongur Tagh (7,649 m) in China, accompanied by Chris Bonington, Peter Boardman and Alan Rouse. He disappeared with Boardman on 17 May 1982 on the North-East Ridge of Everest. The body of Boardman was found in 1992, resting in a sitting position just past the second pinnacle in the extremely difficult area of the "Three Pinnacles" on the middle North-East Ridge of Everest. The body of Tasker is still missing, although some of his climbing equipment was found between the second and third pinnacles.

Tasker had delivered his manuscript for his second book, Savage Arena, which recounted his climbing life from the 1960s–1980, on the eve of his departure for the British Everest expedition in 1982. The book was published posthumously later that year.

The Boardman Tasker Prize for Mountain Literature was founded in memory of Tasker and Boardman and was first awarded in 1983.

== See also ==
- List of people who died climbing Mount Everest
