= Three Pinnacles =

Rock formation on Mount Everest

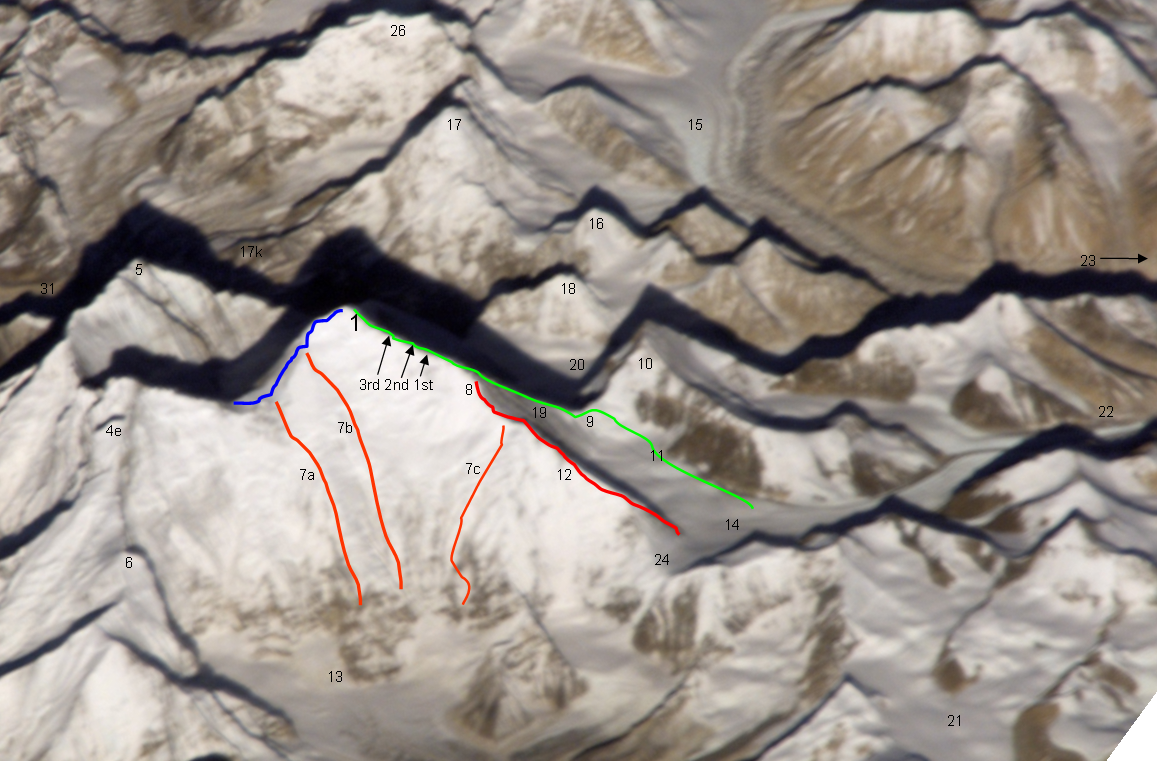
Kangshung Face of Mount Everest with its northeast ridge (No. 12, right) and the Three Pinnacles (No. 8)

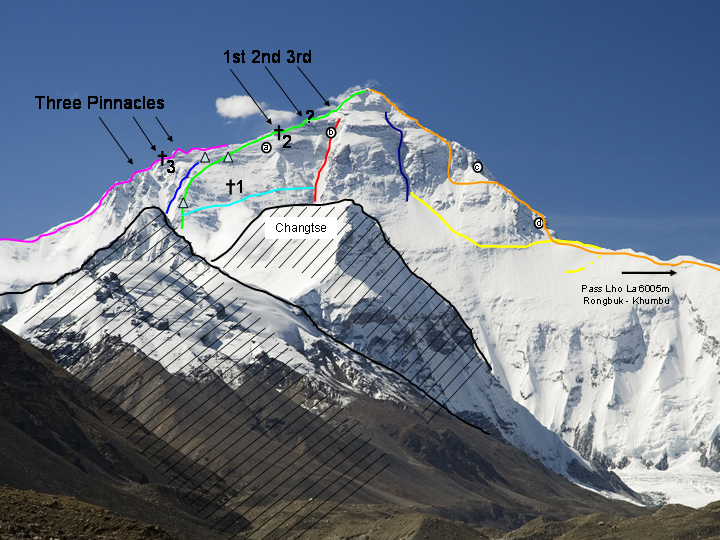
North face of Mount Everest: routes and important points

The Three Pinnacles are a formation of steep rocks along the northeast ridge on Mount Everest. They were one of the longest unsolved challenges in high-level mountaineering, but have now been successfully climbed.

The rocks are located at around 7,800, 8,100 and 8,200 metres above sea level (height of base of pinnacle) and are therefore already in the death zone, in which people cannot usually recover, even at rest.

The normal routes on Everest avoid them; the route via the northeast ridge bypasses them to the right.

During the various attempts to conquer the pinnacles and open a new route along the entire northeast ridge, there were frequently serious problems and fatalities. In 1982 Peter Boardman and Joe Tasker died during their first serious attempt to climb grade 5 climbs in the death zone.

In 1988, Russell Brice and Harry Taylor successfully climbed the Three Pinnacles, but they were so exhausted after climbing the third pinnacle that they abandoned their original plan to continue along the normal route to the summit. Instead, they crossed the normal route along the north ridge and descended to the North Col.

In 1992 a joint Japanese-Kazakh expedition crossed the Pinnacles but was unable to continue to the summit. They found a body beyond the second pinnacle at approximately 8,200m on the Rongbuk side of the ridge. Photographs taken by Vladimir Suviga and sent to Chris Bonington confirmed that the body was that of Peter Boardman. Joe Tasker's body has never been found.

Not until 1995 did a team from a Japanese university, supported by a group of about 35 Sherpa porters, climb the entire northeast ridge route, including the Three Pinnacles in both directions. In order to facilitate the expedition, the Sherpas had covered virtually the entire route with fixed ropes. Only after the ropes were in place did a group of Japanese go to the top.

Even today this part of the vast mountain is almost always avoided, too great are its difficulties that range from the Pinnacles themselves to the weather, the extreme cold, the winds and the altitude as well as the arduous terrain.

Almost all the mountaineering challenges on Mount Everest have now been overcome, but there remain three routes with extraordinary difficulties: a direttissima climb up the avalanche-prone East Face, a direttissima climb up the Southwest Face and ascent of the north pillar on the East Face over the (according to George Mallory) so-called "Fantasy Ridge". This ridge ends at the centre of the northeast ridge – below the Three Pinnacles. A climber wishing to climb up the Fantasy Ridge on his way to the summit would have to negotiate the east ridge and then climb the Three Pinnacles on the northeast ridge.

== Sources ==
- Stephen Venables: Everest, Kangshung Face. Pan, 1991, ISBN 0-330-31559-5
- Roberto Mantovani und Kurt Diemberger: Mount Everest - Kampf in eisigen Höhen. Moewig, 1997, ISBN 3-8118-1715-9
- Stephen Venables: Everest - Die Geschichte seiner Erkundung. Geo, Frederking und Thaler, 2003, ISBN 3-89405-465-4
