= Nick Estcourt =

British mountaineer

- Nick Estcourt in 1975

Personal information
- Nationality: British
- Born: 1942
- Died: 12 June 1978 (aged 36) K2, Pakistan
- Education: Magdalene, Cambridge
- Occupations: rock climber, mountaineer, systems analyst

Nicholas John Estcourt (1942 – 12 June 1978) was a British mountaineer and alpinist who was killed in an avalanche on the West Ridge of K2.

== Early life and education ==
Estcourt spent his childhood on the south coast of England, in Eastbourne and he was educated at Eastbourne College. He first climbed in the European Alps with his father whilst still at school and when in the UK he would cycle the 30 miles to climb at Harrison's Rocks. He went to university to study engineering, in Cambridge. Whilst at Cambridge he joined the University Mountaineering Club, becoming its president for 1963-64. He embarked on his first expedition outside Europe, on a University Mountaineering Club trip to the Stauning Alps of Arctic Greenland, where he made the first ascent of a number of peaks up to 2,830 m (9,280 ft).

He became a member of the Alpine Climbing Group in 1964 (a sub-group of the UK Alpine Club) and in 1967 Estcourt, with Martin Boysen, were the UK's two ACG representatives at the Rassemblement International d'Alpinistes hosted by the French Ecole Nationale de Ski et d'Alpinism.

Soon after leaving university, and after a brief period as a civil engineer, Estcourt started to work for Ferranti in Manchester as a systems analyst.

== Mountaineering in the Himalaya ==
=== 1970: British Annapurna South Face expedition ===
Chris Bonington and others, including Estcourt, had been discussing ideas for expeditions beyond Europe. Because Pakistan and Nepal were at the time off-limits for mountaineering they were initially considering targets in Alaska. However, in autumn 1968 it was announced that expeditions would once again be allowed to Nepal so Bonington applied for a permit to climb the south Face of Annapurna, one of the fourteen 8000ers. At the time that the expedition set out, in March 1970, the only 8000ers which had been ascended more than once were Everest, Cho Oyu and Nanga Parbat; only Everest and Nanga Parbat had been climbed by a route different from that used on the first ascent. Annapurna would be Estcourt's first expedition to the Greater Ranges and neither he, nor three other members of the climbing team (Martin Boysen, Mick Burke and Dougal Haston), had previously been above the height of Mt Blanc (4,806 m (15,768 ft)). Two team members successfully reached the summit (Whillans and Haston) but, although it was Estcourt and Boysen who had forced the hardest piece of ice-climbing on the S face (between Camps 4 and 5), Estcourt didn't get above Camp 6 (7,300 m (24,000 ft)), having become exhausted supporting others whilst carrying loads up to that point.

=== 1972-1973 ===
In 1972 he was a member of the team led by Bonington who attempted the ascent of Everest's Southwest Face. Estcourt "led some of the key sections of the route" and reached the highest point attained by the expedition (8,300 m (27,200 ft)), but that was about 500m short of the summit, just below the 'rock band'.

The following year he took part in a successful attempt on the unclimbed peak Brammah (6,416 m (21,050 ft)), in the Kishtwar Himalaya, again with Bonington. On August 24, 1973 Bonington and Estcourt reached the summit by the southeast ridge.

=== 1975 British Mount Everest Southwest Face expedition ===
The 1975 expedition, led by Bonington, not only achieved the ascent of the previously unclimbed Southwest Face of Everest, which had defeated several previous expeditions, it also resulted in the first ascent of the mountain by British nationals (Doug Scott, Pete Boardman & Dougal Haston, along with the Nepali, Pertemba Sherpa). At the time it was the most difficult route ever climbed at that altitude and, although Escourt didn't reach the summit, the climbing team who "cracked the major problem of the rock band" was Estcourt and Paul ('Tut') Braithwaite. John Hunt wrote shortly afterwards that "Estcourt's superb lead, without the normal safeguards or oxygen at 27,000 feet, up the rickety, outward-leaning ramp of snow-covered rubble which led from the gully .... must be one of the greatest in climbing history".

=== The Ogre (Baintha Brakk) 1977 ===
In 1977 Estcourt, Doug Scott, Chris Bonington, Mo Anthoine, Clive Rowland and Tut Braithwaite attempted The Ogre (Baintha Brakk) in the Karakoram of Pakistan. Bonnington and Estcourt, climbing from the col between the main and west summits, made the first ascent of the lower West Summit (7,150 m (23,460 ft)) on 1 July 1977. At a later stage Anthoine, Rowland and Scott, accompanied by Bonington, also reached the West Summit climbing via the Southwest Spur and the West Ridge. Bonington and Scott went on from there to reach the Main Summit on 13 July. On the first abseil whilst descending from the Main Summit, Scott broke both legs and Bonington then broke two ribs and contracted pneumonia during the week-long descent to base camp much of which took place in a major storm.

=== K2 West Ridge 1978 ===
There had only been two ascents of K2 before Estcourt left the UK with Bonington's 1978 expedition to attempt the mountain's unclimbed West Ridge. By 1 June all of the climbing team had reached the base camp and were ready to start on the mountain. After a few days spent reconnoitring possible approaches to the ridge, Camps I & II were quickly established and Boardman and Tasker started to explore the route towards camp III at 6,900 m (22,600 ft). On 12 June Scott, Estcourt and a high altitude porter, Quamajan, set off from Camp I to transport supplies to Camp II. As they crossed a snow basin, with Scott in front, just approaching the tents of Camp II, and Quamajan at the rear, the whole slope avalanched. Estcourt was swept away and buried in the avalanche debris which had come from an area 500 feet wide and 300 feet high and swept 3000 feet down the mountainside. Following Estcourt's death the team decided that they would abandon the expedition although they had only been on the mountain for 12 days.

Captain Shafiq, the Pakistani Liaison Officer for the 1978 K2 expedition on which Estcourt lost his life, hammered out a memorial plaque which rests on the Gilkey Memorial and reads "In memory of great hero who has sacrificed his life for the great cause of mountaineering God may rest his soul in peace !Amin! Late Mister Nick Estcourt".

== Personal life and legacy ==
Estcourt married his wife Carolyn in 1966. Maria Coffey has written about the impact of Estcourt's death on his wife and three children.

In 1974 Estcourt and Tut Braithwaite had made the first free ascent of the rock climb Giant, on Creag an Dubh Loch, that climb is featured in Extreme Rock.

In 1977 he opened a climbing equipment shop in Altrincham, Nick Estcourt Outdoor Sports, which continued trading after his death and was managed by Dave Pearce.

Since 1980, the Nick Estcourt Award, established in his memory, to encourage future generations of mountaineers, has granted financial assistance annually to expeditions attempting a significant mountaineering objective.

There is a memorial to Estcourt in the Parish Church of Bowdon.

== See also ==
- Joe Tasker
- List of deaths on eight-thousanders
- Peter Boardman
- Baintha Brakk, also known as The Ogre
