= Aguja Rafael Juárez =

Mountain in Santa Cruz Province, Argentina

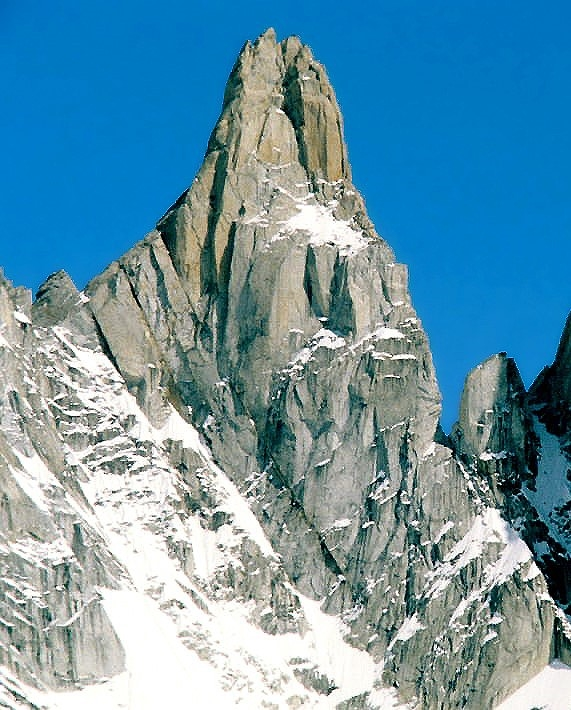
- East face

Highest point
- Elevation: 2,450 m (8,038 ft)
- Prominence: 157 m (515 ft)
- Isolation: 0.33 km (0.21 mi)
- Coordinates: 49°17′08″S 73°02′25″W

Naming
- Etymology: Rafael Juárez

Geography
- Location within Argentina Location within South America Location within Southern Patagonia
- Interactive map of Aguja Rafael Juárez
- Country: Argentina
- Province: Santa Cruz
- Protected area: Los Glaciares National Park
- Parent range: Andes
- Topo map: IGN 4769‑III El Chaltén

Geology
- Rock age: Cretaceous
- Rock type: Granite

Climbing
- First ascent: 1974

Aguja Rafael Juárez is a mountain in Santa Cruz Province, Argentina.

== Description ==
Aguja Rafael Juárez is a 2,450-meter-elevation (8,038-foot) summit in the Andes. The peak is located 1.58 kilometers (1 mile) south of Fitz Roy and 12 kilometers (7.5 miles) northwest of El Chaltén, in Los Glaciares National Park of Patagonia. Precipitation runoff from the mountain's slopes drains to Viedma Lake. Topographic relief is significant as the summit rises 1,550 meters (5,085 ft) above Laguna Sucia in two kilometers (1.2 miles), and 1,450 meters (4,757 ft) above the Torre Glacier in 1.5 kilometers (0.93 mile). The first ascent of the summit was made in 1974 by Rick Silvester, Dan Reid, Paul Braithwaite, Martin Boysen, and Leo Dickinson via the west face and south ridge. The toponym, which translates as Rafael Juárez Needle, was applied by the first ascent team to honor Argentine mountaineer Rafael Juárez (1954–1974) who perished with his climbing companion when they fell into a crevasse on the Adela Glacier on January 22, 1974. The peak was originally called "Aguja Innominata" (Nameless Needle) by Louis Lliboutry in 1952. The nearest higher peak is Aguja Saint Exupery, 0.45 kilometer (0.28 mile) to the south.

== Climbing history ==
Established climbing routes with first ascents:

- Anglo-Americana – 1974 – R. Silvester, D. Reid, P. Braithwaite, M. Boysen, L. Dickinson
- Kearney-Harrington (West Face) – 1988 – Alan Kearney, Sue Harrington
- Piola-Anker (North Ridge) – 1989 – Daniel Anker, Michel Piola
- Lüthi-Dominguez (East Face) – 1989 – Peter Lüthi, Carlos Domínguez
- De Klerk-Brugger (North Ridge) – 1991 – Andy De Klerk, Julie Brugger
- Corallo (West Face) – 1994 – Fabio Leoni, Ermanno Salvaterra
- Bonapace - Hevia (North Ridge) – 1995 – Tommy Bonapace, Julián Hevia
- Artebelleza (North Face) – 2002 – Anke Claus, Carsten Von Birckhahn
- Quilombo (West Face) – 2004 – Zack Smith, Heidi Wirtz
- Como No! (North Face) – 2005 – Jon Walsh
- Blood on the Tracks (North Face) – 2005 – Freddie Wilkinson, Paul Tureki, Dave Sharratt, Taki Miyamoto
- Los Sanjuaniños (North Ridge) – 2012 – Gabriel Fava, Wenny Sánchez, Roberto Treu
- Tiempo para la Playa (North Face) – 2012 – Mikey Schaefer, Kate Rutherford
- Davis Robbins-Schaffer (West Face) – 2015 – Crystal Davis-Robbins, Jonathan Schaffer

== Climate ==
According to the Köppen climate classification system, Aguja Rafael Juárez is located in a tundra climate zone with cold, snowy winters, and cool summers. Weather systems are forced upward by the mountains (orographic lift), causing moisture to drop in the form of rain and snow. This climate supports the Rio Blancas Glacier below the east slope, and the Torre Glacier to the west. The months of November through February offer the most favorable weather for visiting or climbing this peak.

== Gallery ==
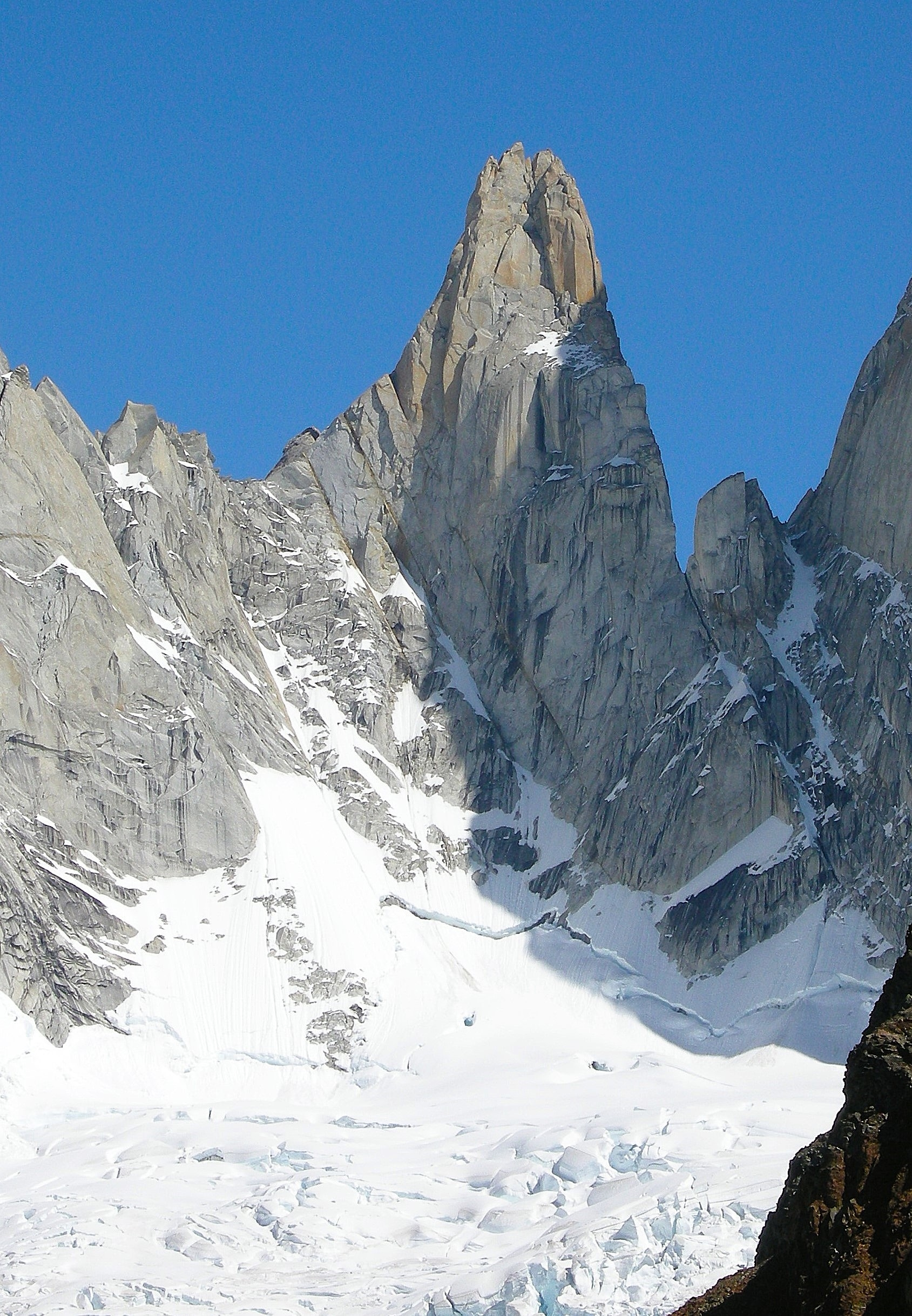
East Face

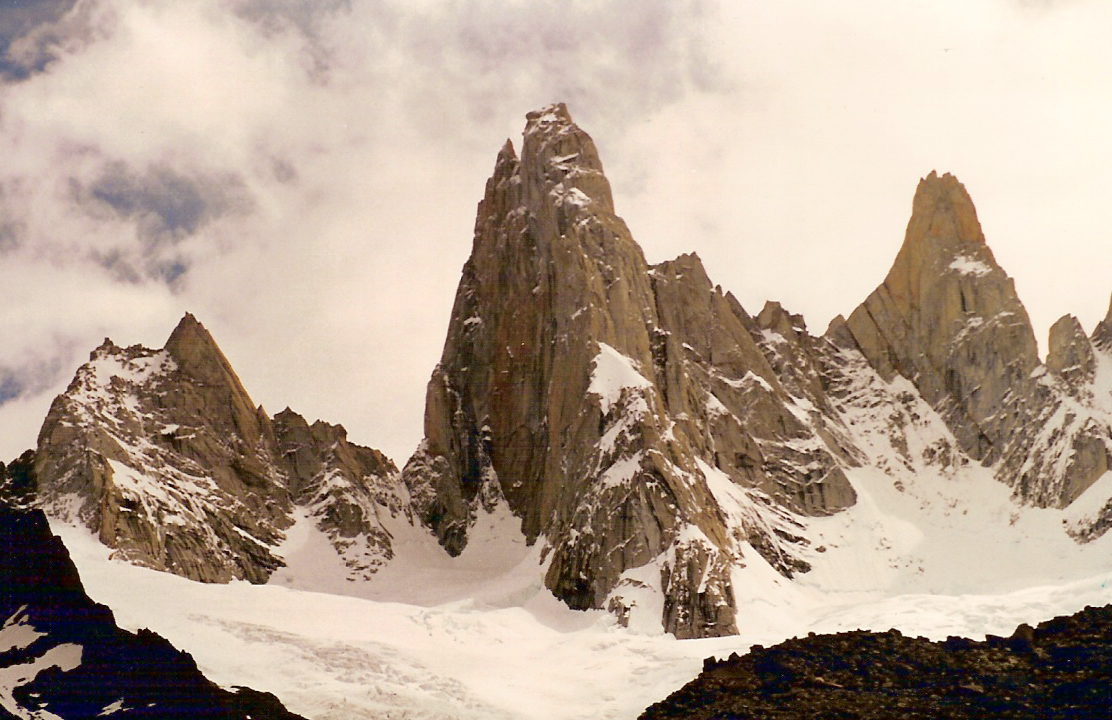
Aguja Saint Exupery centered, Aguja Rafael Juárez to right

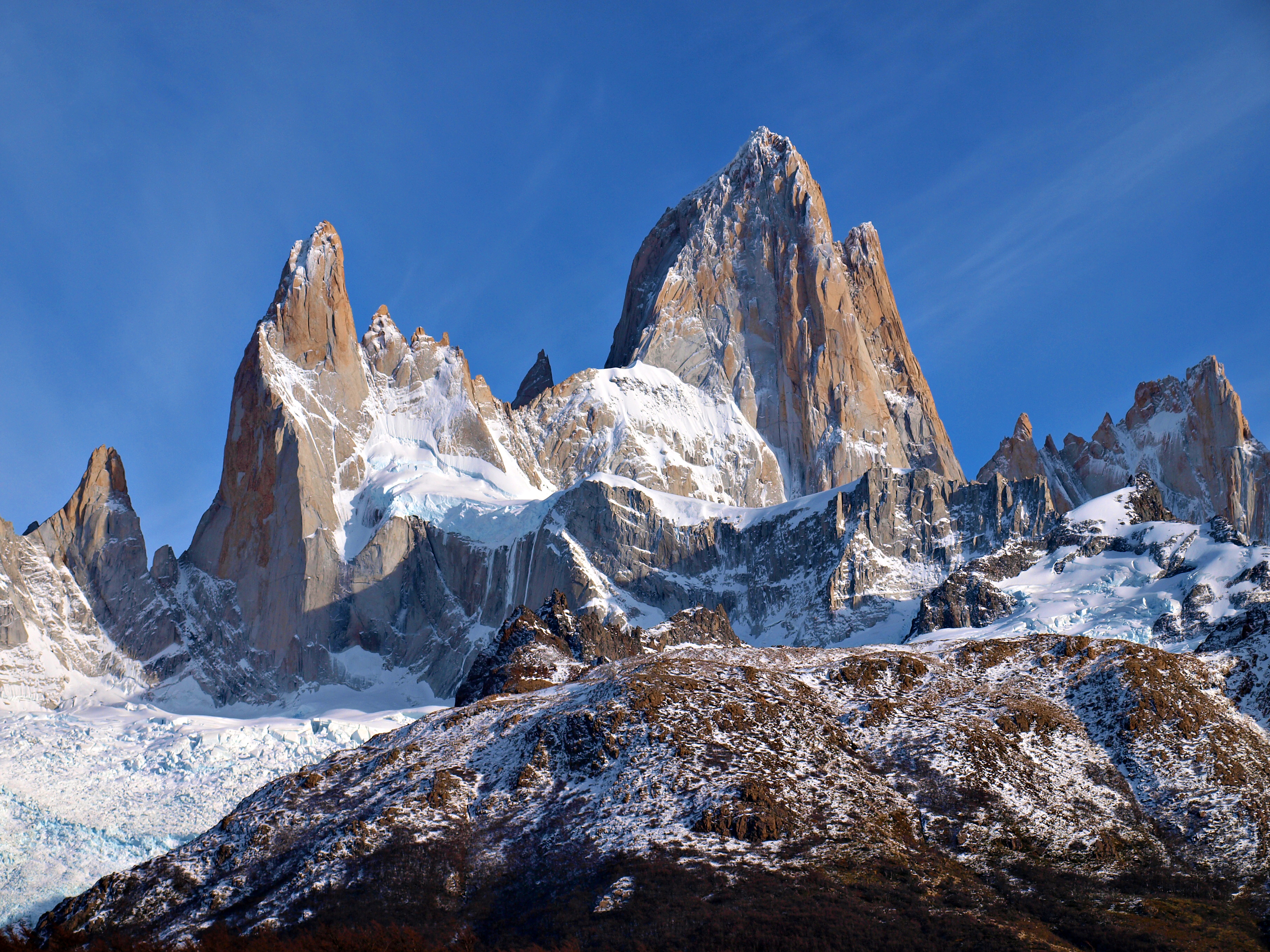
Aguja Rafael Juárez furthest to left, Fitz Roy centered

== See also ==
- List of mountains in Argentina
