= Listed buildings in Bowdon, Greater Manchester =

Bowdon is a village in the Metropolitan Borough of Trafford, Greater Manchester, England. It contains 33 listed buildings that are recorded in the National Heritage List for England. Of these, two are listed at Grade II*, the middle grade, and the others are at Grade II, the lowest grade. Bowdon originated as a village in a rural environment, and grew during the 19th century as a commuter town for Manchester, attracting wealthy merchants who built substantial houses. The oldest listed buildings are farmhouses and farm buildings, and houses and cottages clustered around the church, and the later ones include some of the larger houses. The other listed buildings include the church and associated structures, a public house, a drinking fountain, and a war memorial.

== Key ==
Grade	Criteria
II*	Particularly important buildings of more than special interest
II	Buildings of national importance and special interest

== Buildings ==
Name and location	Photograph	Date	Notes	Grade
Barn, Moss Farm; 53.37405°N 2.35362°W	—	16th century	A cruck barn, with later walls of brick and an asbestos roof. It originally had six bays, but has been reduced to three. There are three pairs of crucks.	II
Moss Farmhouse; 53.37381°N 2.35359°W	—	16th century	A house in rendered brick with a slate roof. The original range has one storey with an attic and three bays, and the 17th-century cross-wing has a stone plinth and two storeys. In the original part are two cruck frames. The windows are casements, and there are two dormers at the rear of the original range.	II
Moss Cottage; 53.37432°N 2.35259°W	—	1666	A timber framed cottage with brick walls and a thatched roof. It has one storey with an attic, two bays, and a much later parallel range at the rear. The windows are casements, and there is a four-light dormer. Inside there are timber framed walls.	II
Bowdon Old Hall; 53.37524°N 2.36185°W	—	c. 1700	The house was refaced at the rear in the 19th century. It is in brick with stone quoins, a brick moulded band, and a clay tile roof with coped gables. There are two storeys and five bays, a central doorway with a segmental head, and the windows are cross windows replacing windows with pointed heads. The rear is stuccod, and has quoins, a modillion cornice, two bay windows, and a porch with an arched entrance.	II
West Bank Farmhouse; 53.37135°N 2.37040°W	—	Mid-18th century	A brick house with a slate roof, two storeys with an attic, a double-depth plan, and two bays. The central porch has a brick semi-elliptical arched opening. The windows are three-light casements with cambered brick arches and stone sills.	II
1 Church Brow; 53.37791°N 2.36511°W	—	18th century	A brick house with a slate roof, two storeys, two bays, and a 20th-century extension to the rear. Steps lead up to a doorway in the left bay, and the windows are all 20th-century casements.	II
5 and 6 Church Brow; 53.37783°N 2.36539°W	—	18th century	A pair of brick cottages with a slate roof, two storeys, one bay each, and a lean-to at the rear. Each cottage has a doorway to the right, and a three-light 20th-century casement window in both floors.	II
7 Church Brow; 53.37778°N 2.36556°W		18th century	A brick house incorporating earlier timber framing and with a slate roof. There are two storeys and three bays. The doorway is in the second bay, the windows on the ground floor have segmental-arch brick heads, on the upper floor they have flat heads, and they are all three-light 20th-century casement windows. On the roof is a dormer.	II
7A, 8, 9 and 10 Church Brow; 53.37775°N 2.36584°W		18th century	A row of four brick cottages with slate roofs, two storeys, and each with one bay. No. 7A (originally Bowdon Old Forge) is taller, with a gable facing the road, a 20th-century single-storey extension to the right, and 20th-century windows with stone lintels. No. 8 has a flat-headed doorway and windows, and the doorways and windows of No. 9 and 10 have segmental heads.	II
Milestone in grounds of The Priory; 53.36729°N 2.36208°W	—	18th century	The milestone has been moved from its original position. It is in stone, and consists of a triangular post with one flat side and two convex sides. It is inscribed with the distances in miles to Altrincham, Manchester, and Chester.	II
Sundial in grounds of The Priory; 53.36789°N 2.36130°W	—	18th century	The sundial is in stone. It consists of a circular plinth, a bulbous moulded base, a shaft, and a moulded head carrying a brass dial and gnomon.	II
The White Cottage; 53.37758°N 2.36604°W	—	18th century	A brick house with a slate roof that was extended to the right with the addition of a bay in the 19th century. There are two storeys, three bays, and a rear wing. The doorway is in the right of the middle bay. In the first two bays are casement windows, on the ground floor with segmental heads, and on the upper floor with flat heads. The right bay contains a two-storey bay window with sashes.	II
Vale House; 53.37702°N 2.36591°W	—	18th century	A roughcast brick house with a dentilled eaves cornice, possibly incorporating earlier material, with a slate roof. It has an L-shaped plan, with a later extension in the angle, two storeys, and a three-bay front. In the centre is a door with a fanlight and a trellis porch. There is one casement window, and the other windows are sashes.	II
Bowgreen Farmhouse; 53.36854°N 2.37058°W	—	Late 18th century	A brick farmhouse with a slate roof. It has two storeys, a single-depth plan with a shorter parallel rear range, and two bays. The central doorway has a moulded surround, and the windows are sashes, with stone sills and cambered brick arches on the ground floor and flat arches on the upper floor.	II
The Griffin; 53.37808°N 2.36339°W		Late 18th century	A public house in rendered brick with stone quoins, a small eaves cornice, and a slate roof. There are two storeys, a double-depth plan, and two bays, with three bays and a lean-to added to the right in the 19th century. Above the doorway is a canopy, and the windows are sashes.	II
The Priory and The Well House; 53.36765°N 2.36198°W	—	Late 18th century	Originally a vicarage, later divided into two dwellings, it is roughcast with a slate roof. The main part has two storeys and six bays, and there are wings at both ends, the wing at the left with three storeys. The doorway has a moulded surround and a hood mould. Most of the windows are sashes, some are horizontally-sliding, there are some casement windows, and two canted bay windows at the rear.	II
Scriven House, The Ridge, adjoining shop, The Hollies and Farwood; 53.37751°N 2.36224°W	—	Early 19th century	A complex of houses, some of which were later used for other purposes, they are in brick with roofs of slate and concrete. Scriven House has a stone plinth, an eaves cornice, two storeys, and two bays. The windows are sashes with flat brick arches and stone sills, and the doorway, which is on the side, has a fanlight. The Ridge, to the right, projects, and has three storeys, one bay, and is gabled. The other buildings are to the right and the rear, and have an irregular plan.	II
Oakfield Cottage and The Cottage; 53.37870°N 2.35453°W	—	c. 1830	A pair of rendered brick houses on a projecting plinth and with a slate roof. Each house has two storeys and three bays, a central doorway with a trellis porch and a fanlight. On the ground floor are two triangular-headed windows, each with a hood mould, a finial, and a stone sill. The windows on the upper floor have flat heads and splayed jambs.	II
30, 32 and 34 Langham Road; 53.37747°N 2.36647°W	—	c. 1830–1840	A terrace of three rendered brick houses with rusticated quoins, an eaves cornice, and a slate roof. There are two storeys, a double-depth plan, and each house has two bays. Each house has a door with a fanlight, No. 30 has a flat hood on columns, No. 32 has a wrought iron porch, and No. 34 has a semicircular hood. Nos. 30 and 34 have segmental bow windows, and the other windows are sashes.	II
High Lawn; 53.37598°N 2.35748°W	—	c. 1843	A large house by Richard Lane, later divided into flats. It is in rendered brick on a stone plinth, with stone dressings, rustication on the ground floor, a band, a blocking course, an eaves cornice, a parapet, and a slate roof. The house has a square plan, with sides of three bays, and a four-bay extension to the left. In the centre of the front is a two-storey projecting porch with a window flanked by pilasters over an Ionic tetrastyle recessed porch. The windows are sashes, and a bay window was added later. In the garden front is a two-storey bow window, and on the roof is a later belvedere with an elaborate cast iron ridge.	II
Mile post, Shepherds Brow; 53.38230°N 2.37313°W	—	Mid-19th century	The mile post is in cast iron, and consists of a circular post with a hemi-spherical top. It is inscribed with the distances in miles to Altrincham, Knutsford and Northwich.	II
St Mary's Church; 53.37794°N 2.36436°W		1858–1860	The church is in stone with a slate roof, and consists of a nave with a clerestory, north and south aisles, north and south porches, north and south transepts, a chancel with a vestry, and a west tower. The tower has four stages, diagonal buttresses, clock faces, gargoyles, and an embattled parapet. The windows in the aisles and clerestory have square heads, the aisles are embattled, and the transepts have corner pinnacles.	II*
Piers, railings and walls, St Mary's Church; 53.37776°N 2.36348°W	—	c. 1860	The walls and railings run along the north, west and east sides of the churchyard; the walls are in sandstone, and the railings, which have fleur-de-lis finials, are in cast iron. There are eleven piers, each about 1.5 metres (4 ft 11 in) tall, with an octagonal plan, and panels carved with a Tudor rose motif.	II
Summerfield and Cransley; 53.37581°N 2.35965°W	—	c. 1860	Originally one house, later divided into two, it is in brick on a stone plinth, with a sill band, projecting eaves with Ionic modillions, and a slate roof. The house is in Italianate style, with two storeys, a double-depth plan, five bays with single-storey bay to the left, the right bay projecting as a wing, with a single-storey porch in the angle. The porch has square columns and a coped parapet with balusters. The windows are sashes with architraves. The right bay has a gable with an open pediment. In the single-storey bay is a doorway with pilasters, an entablature and side lights, and on the garden front is a single-storey canted bay window.	II
Dene Hill and The Old Vicarage; 53.37820°N 2.37059°W	—	1863–64	Originally a vicarage, later divided into two dwellings, it is in brick with stone dressings, quoins, a string course, and a slate roof with coped gables. There are two storeys with attics, and sides of four and three bays. The central two bays form a tower-like structure with buttresses, and a mansard roof. The windows have pointed heads and polychromatic voussoirs. At the rear are two canted bay windows.	II
Oakley; 53.37980°N 2.36870°W	—	1869–70	A large house in sandstone that has a roof of Welsh slate with coped gables. It has an asymmetrical linear plan, two storeys with attics, and fronts of six and two bays. On the front is a gabled porch with an arched doorway, above which is a canted oriel window with an embattled parapet and pinnacles. The windows are sashes, and there are gabled dormers. At the right is a canted timber conservatory. At the rear are bay windows, and a pier rising to a pinnacle with a gargoyle.	II
Water fountain 53.37826°N 2.36390°W	—	1872	A drinking fountain in ashlar stone and polished granite, it has a three-stepped plinth and a base with octagonal corner columns and two troughs. Above this are four recesses with cusped arches and polished granite columns. In the recesses are the fountains and bowls alternating with inscriptions. On the top is a Gothic-style canopy.	II
Erlesdene; 53.37915°N 2.36786°W	—	1873	A large house, later divided into flats, it is in stone on a projecting plinth, with quoins, bands, projecting eaves, and a steep slate roof. The house has an irregular plan, two storeys with attics, and sides of eight and five bays. The entrance porch has arched openings with keystones, Corinthian columns, angle buttresses, a cornice, a parapet, and finials. There is a four-stage tower with a two-storey embattled oriel window, a modillion eaves cornice, a pierced parapet, and an elaborate weathervane. Other features include gables, some shaped, mullioned or mullioned and transomed windows, and a canted bay window.	II
Denzell House; 53.38260°N 2.37182°W		1874	A large house in stone on a plinth, with quoins, bands, and a tiled roof with crested ridge tiles. There are two storeys and a garden front of five bays, with shaped gables, bay windows, an oriel window on a granite column with a spire above, and mullioned windows, some also with transoms. At one end is a porte-cochère and at the other end is a conservatory.	II*
Hilston House; 53.38154°N 2.37220°W	—	c. 1880	A large house in stone with a plinth, rusticated quoins, moulded bands, a blocking course, a modillioned eaves cornice, and a slate roof. It is in free Italianate style, with an irregular plan, two storeys with attics, and sides of five and four bays. The entrance porch has two pairs of Tuscan pilasters, an entablature, a baluster parapet, and two semicircular openings with fluted keystones. The left bay projects, and has a bay window and a pedimented gable. The windows are sashes, and other features include oriel windows and an iron balcony.	II
Charcoal Lodge; 53.38267°N 2.38388°W		1906	A gatehouse for Dunham Massey Hall built by J. Compton Hall for the 9th Earl of Warrington. It has a ground floor of stone, surmounted by a brick first floor and a slate roof, with a two-storey central porch bearing a coat of arms.	II
War memorial, St Mary's Church; 53.37807°N 2.36395°W	—	c. 1920	The war memorial is in the churchyard, and is in sandstone. It has an octagonal base on which is an octagonal buttressed tapering shaft surmounted by a cross. Standing by the base of the shaft is a statue of St George under a canopy. There are inscriptions on the base.	II
Sundial post 53.37770°N 2.36427°W	—	Undated	The sundial post is in the churchyard of St Mary's Church. It is in sandstone, and consists of an octagonal shaft in a square base.	II
