= Dennis Davis (climber) =

British mountain climber

- Born: 28 January 1927; Dulwich, England
- Died: 19 February 2015 (aged 88); Macclesfield, England
- Occupation: Engineer
- Spouse: Renata Davis
- Children: 3

Dennis Davis (28 January 1927 – 19 February 2015) was a British mountaineer.

Dennis got his taste for the Himalaya in 1955 when, along with Alf Gregory, Ted Courtney and Peter Boultbee he visited the Rolwaling sub-range. Between the four of them they climbed 19 peaks, of which 16 were first ascents of between 19,000 and 22,000 ft.

In 1957, Dennis and Charles Evans, as a two-man team without supplementary oxygen, climbed Annapurna IV before making an ambitious, but unsuccessful attempt on Annapurna II.

Dennis, along with Sherpa Tashi completed the first ascent of Nuptse on 16 May 1961. Other (British) members of the expedition were Joe Walmsley (expedition leader), Les Brown, Chris Bonnington Jim Swallow, Simon Clark and John Streetley. They travelled to Nepal in two Standard Vanguard estate cars by road, through countries including Turkey, Iran, Afghanistan and India. The climb was completed without the aid of oxygen.

== Expeditions ==
- 1955 – Rolwaling Himal
- 1957 – Annapurna IV
- 1961 – Nuptse
