= Brammah =

Mountain in Jammu and Kashmir, India

Brammah I
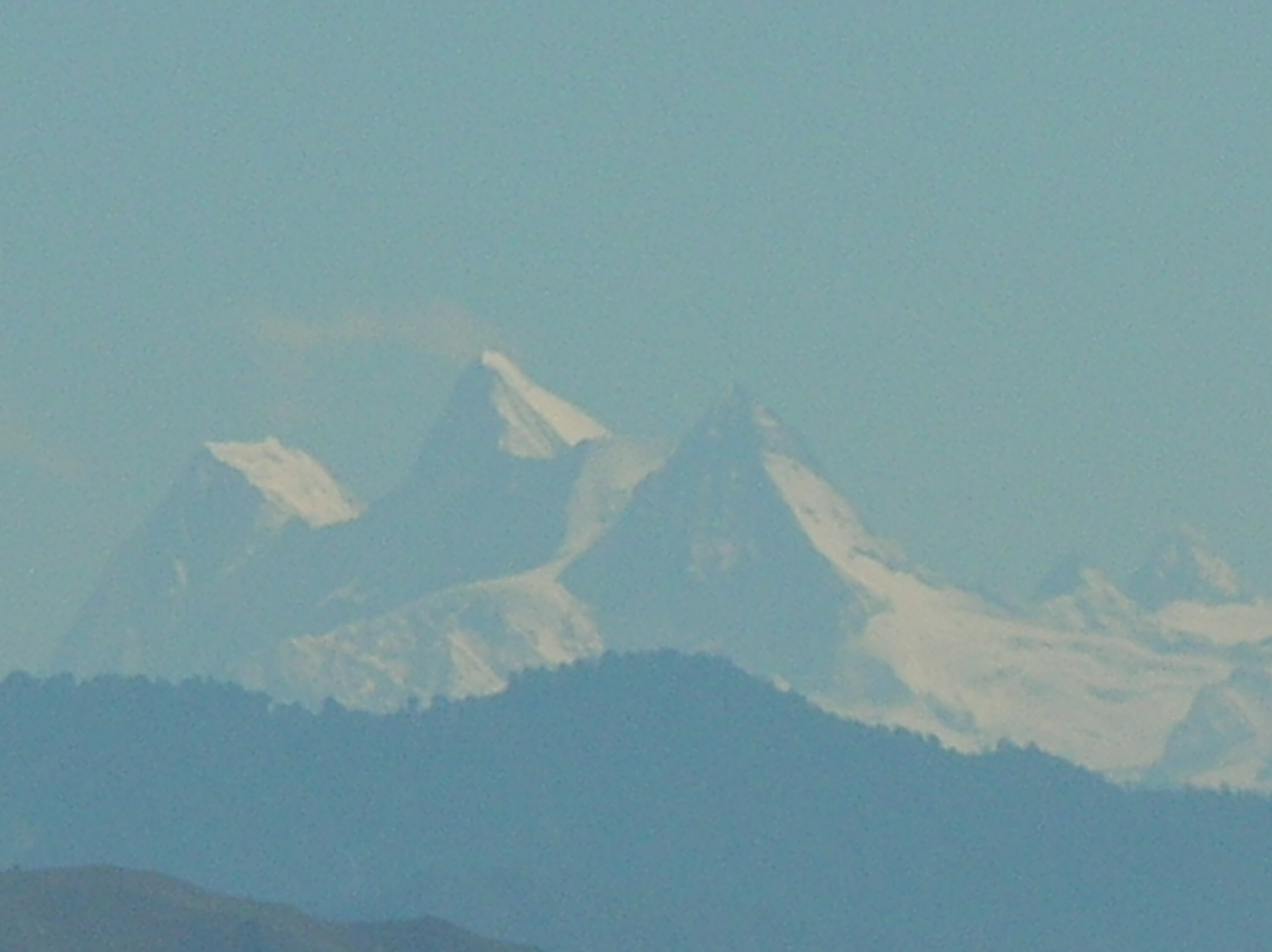
- Brahma 1 and 2 peaks, as seen from Nathatop

Highest point
- Elevation: 6,416 m (21,050 ft)
- Coordinates: 33°30′23″N 76°03′04″E

Geography
- Location within Jammu and Kashmir Location within India
- Location: Jammu and Kashmir, India
- Parent range: Kishtwar Himalayas

Climbing
- First ascent: August 24, 1973 by Chris Bonington and Nick Estcourt
- Easiest route: Southeast Ridge: snow/ice/rock climb

Brammah is a mountain massif in the Kishtwar Himalayas of Jammu and Kashmir, India, east of the town of Kishtwar and near the border with Himachal Pradesh. It comprises four peaks, listed in order from west to east: Brammah I (6,416 m (21,050 ft), first ascent 1973), Flat Top (6,103 m (20,023 ft), first ascent 1980), Brammah II, (6,485 m (21,276 ft), first ascent 1975), and Arjuna (6,230 m (20,440 ft), first ascent 1983).

Brammah II is the highest of the group. While Brammah I is not the highest, it is the most dramatic, as it is situated at the western end of the massif, above a low base.

Brammah I is particularly notable both for its huge rise above local terrain and for its being the site of the first successful major climb in the Kishtwar Himalaya. British mountaineer Chris Bonington, along with Nick Estcourt, and aided by the Indian Institute of Skiing and Mountaineering, Gulmarg, made the first ascent of Brammah I in 1973 via the Southeast Ridge. Estcourt noted that "it is not the highest peak in Kishtwar, but it is the most obvious and elegant."

The second ascent of Brammah I in 1978 was also made by a British group, comprising Paul Belcher, Duncan Nicholson, Jon Scott, and Anthony Wheaton. Nicholson and Scott perished on the descent.

Anthony Wheaton returned to the sister mountain, Brammah's wife in 1979 and made the first British ascent with Richard Hester on September 16, 1979.
