= Rangrik Rang =

Mountain peak

- Location within India

Highest point
- Elevation: 6,553 m (21,499 ft)
- Prominence: 1,535 m (5,036 ft)
- Coordinates: 31°21′13″N 78°36′50″E

Geography
- Location: Himachal Pradesh

Climbing
- First ascent: 1994 by Indo-British Expedition Team

Rangrik Rang is a mountain in the Kinnaur district of Himachal Pradesh in India.

Rangrik Airport, the proposed airport will be situated near Rangrik Rang's base.

== Location ==
The mountain is 6,553 m (21,499 ft) above sea level and is named after the Rangrik Tungma temple just below it. The peak can be found to the north of the upper Sanglatals. The Eastern and Western Racho Khad ice masses feed on the upper east and northwest flanks of Rangrik Rang, respectively, and support the northbound Tirang.

== Climbing history ==
The peak was summited on 20 June 1994 through the northeast ridge by an Indo-British expedition team. The team consisted of the following members; Chris Bonington, Jim Fotheringham, Muslim Contractor, Graham Little, Divyesh Muni, Jim Lowther, Paul Nunn, and Pasang Bodh.

== See also ==
- Tourism in India
- List of ultras of the Himalayas
