= Sickle Moon Peak =

Mountain in Jammu and Kashmir, India

- Bharanzar Peak
- Location within Jammu and Kashmir

Highest point
- Elevation: 6,574 m (21,568 ft)
- Prominence: 1,606 m (5,269 ft)
- Listing: Ultra
- Coordinates: 33°36′09″N 76°07′54″E

Geography
- Location: Village Kiyar, Tehsil Dachhan, Kishtwar district, Jammu and Kashmir, India
- Parent range: Himalayas

Climbing
- First ascent: 1975 by Lt. Col. D. N. Tankha (India) of HAWS
- Easiest route: North Ridge: glacier/snow/ice climb

Sickle Moon Peak or Bharanzar Peak (6,574 metres or 21,568 feet) is located in the Kishtwar Himalaya and is the highest summit of this sub-range. It lies in the western Himalayan range, and is 12 km (7 mi) north of Brammah massif in Kishtwar, 55 kilometers east of Kishtwar town and 195 kilometers east of Srinagar, the summer capital of the Indian union territory of Jammu and Kashmir.

The Brammah massif lies south of Sickle Moon and is separated by a 12 kilometer glacier. The nearest Peaks are Brahma I 21,050 ft (6,416 metres), Flat Top 20,023 ft (6,103 metres), Brahma II 21,276 ft (6,485 metres), and Arjuna 20,440 ft (6,230 metres), listed in order from west to east.

== Mountaineering ==
The east part of Kishtwar sub-range was first assessed by an Australian team in 1939. The eastern approaches of this Peak were explored by two Austrian mountaineers in 1947, including Fritz Kolb, from its base at Machail and climbed two small peeks. After a period of closure, the area was again open to non-Indians in the early seventies, and there was a rush to climb the obvious plums in the western region. In 1973 British mountaineers Nick Escourt and Chris Bonington made an ascent of Brammah I (6416 m) and two years later in 1975 a team of Indian High Altitude Warfare School (HAWS) led by Lt. Col. D. N. Tankha made the first ascent of this Peak.

The massif is accessed by 145 kilometers by road from Srinagar up to Kishtwar town and then 50 kilometers alpine track leads to the base of the summit.

== See also ==
- List of ultras of the Himalayas
