= Aguja Saint Exupery =

Mountain in Patagonia, Argentina

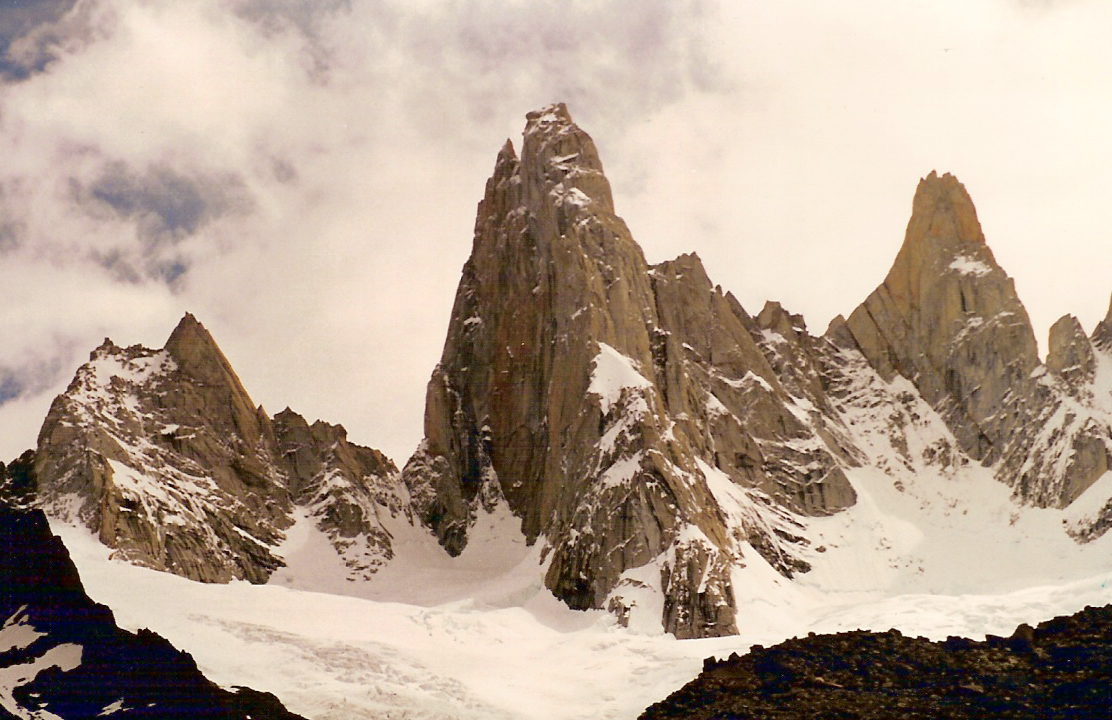
- Aguja Saint Exupery, in the middle between Aguja de la S (L) and Aguja Rafael Juárez (R), Jan 20, 2001

Highest point
- Elevation: 2,558 m (8,392 ft)
- Coordinates: 49°17′18.5″S 73°02′17.7″W

Geography
- Location: Patagonia, Argentina
- Parent range: Andes

Geology
- Mountain type: granite

Climbing
- First ascent: 1968 by Silvia Metzeltin, Gino Buscaini, Lino Condot, Walter Romano and Silvano Sinigoi (Italy)
- Easiest route: rock/snow/ice

The Aguja Saint Exupery is a mountain spear ('aguja') located near the Cerro Chaltén in the Los Glaciares National Park in Patagonia, Argentina.

The mountain is named in memory of Antoine de Saint-Exupéry, the French writer and aviator who was director of the Aeroposta Argentina airline and pioneered postal flights in the Patagonia region between 1929 and 1931.

The Aguja Saint Exupery is not as impressive as its taller neighbors Cerro Chaltén and the striking Cerro Torre, but due to the length of its climbing routes and the extreme weather conditions of the southern Andes, it shares the same big wall reputation as most Patagonian peaks. The Aguja Saint Exupery was first climbed on February 23, 1968, by Silvia Metzeltin, Gino Buscaini, Lino Condot, Walter Romano & Silvano Sinigoi, an Italian team of climbers who opened an 800 metres (2,625 ft) route on its East Pillar.

== Dead mountaineers ==
- Bryn Carlyle Norman, a Canadian in January 2012.
