= Indian Institute of Skiing and Mountaineering =

- IIS&M
- Established: 1969; 57 years ago
- Affiliations: Government of India, Department of Tourism
- Principal: Dr. Alok Sharma
- Location: Gulmarg, J&K, India

Indian Institute of Skiing and Mountaineering (IIS&M) was established in 1969 at Gulmarg by the Department of Tourism and the Government of India. The institute is chartered to train skiers and mountaineers from all over the world.

== History ==
Founded in 1969, initially IIS&M was started as a Project named Gulmarg Winter Sports Project (GWSP) in order to develop ski resorts of international standard in Gulmarg. Now it has grown into an institute which conducts various adventure courses and corporate activities.

== Courses ==
The institute conducts courses on various fields such as skiing, water skiing, paragliding, paramotors, parasailing, hot air ballooning, and canoeing
