= Tut Braithwaite =

British mountaineer (born 1946)

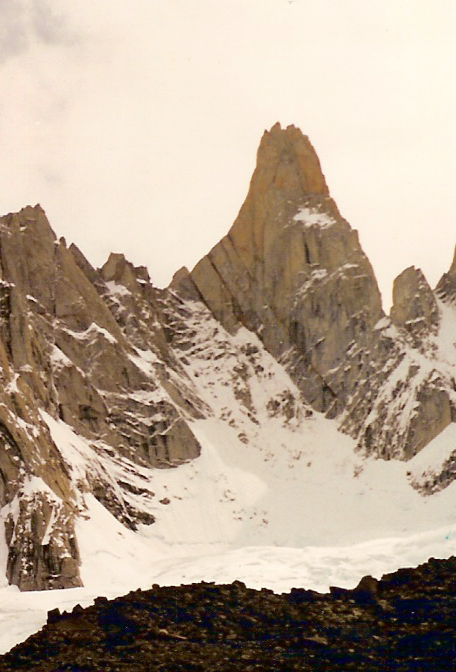
Point Innominata, a peak of Aguja Saint Exupery

Paul ("Tut") Braithwaite (born 2 June 1946) is a British rock climber, mountaineer, and company director. With Nick Estcourt he climbed Mount Everest's almost vertical Rock Band, a key to the success of the 1975 British Mount Everest Southwest Face expedition. He was president of the Alpine Club from 2007 to 2010.

== Early life ==
Born in Oldham in 1946, Paul Braithwaite, always known to climbers as "Tut", took to rock climbing at the age of fourteen on rock outcrops in the Pennines. He worked as a painter and decorator, saving up to go on climbing expeditions in the Alps.

== Climbing career ==
By eighteen, Braithwaite had climbed the Eiger and the Matterhorn. He went on to put up many new routes in Britain including Scansor on Stob Coire nan Lochan (a subsidiary peak of Bidean nam Bian) and The Cumbrian on the Esk Buttress of Scafell Pike. He made the first ascent of East Pillar on Mount Asgard on Baffin Island in 1972; of Pik Lenin in the Pamirs by its south-east spur route in 1974; and of Point Innominata (a subsidiary peak of Aguja Saint Exupery) in Patagonia also in 1974. He made the first British ascent of Croz Spur on Grandes Jorasses.

On the 1975 ascent of Mount Everest by its Southwest Face, he and Nick Estcourt climbed the Rock Band at about 8,200 metres (27,000 ft) setting up fixed ropes that allowed other expedition members to reach the summit of Everest for the first time by a route up one of its faces. Not only was this a key aspect of the climb of the face but, by expending their efforts on this part of the climb, they made it unlikely that they themselves would be able to attempt the summit.

In 1977, on an expedition to The Ogre (Baintha Brakk) he was injured by a falling rock. He joined Chris Bonington's 1978 expedition attempting the West Ridge of K2 but had to withdraw due to ill health.

=== Other climbing ===
Braithwaite has been a trustee of the Mountain Heritage Trust and, since 2006, of Community Action Nepal.

== Non-climbing career ==
In 1975 he founded a sports shop "Paul Braithwaite Outdoor Sports" which he ran until he sold the business in 1999. He was the managing director of Vertical Access Ltd, a Mossley company he established in 1988 for developing techniques for working at height in a commercial and industrial environment.
