= Nuptse =

Mountain in Nepal

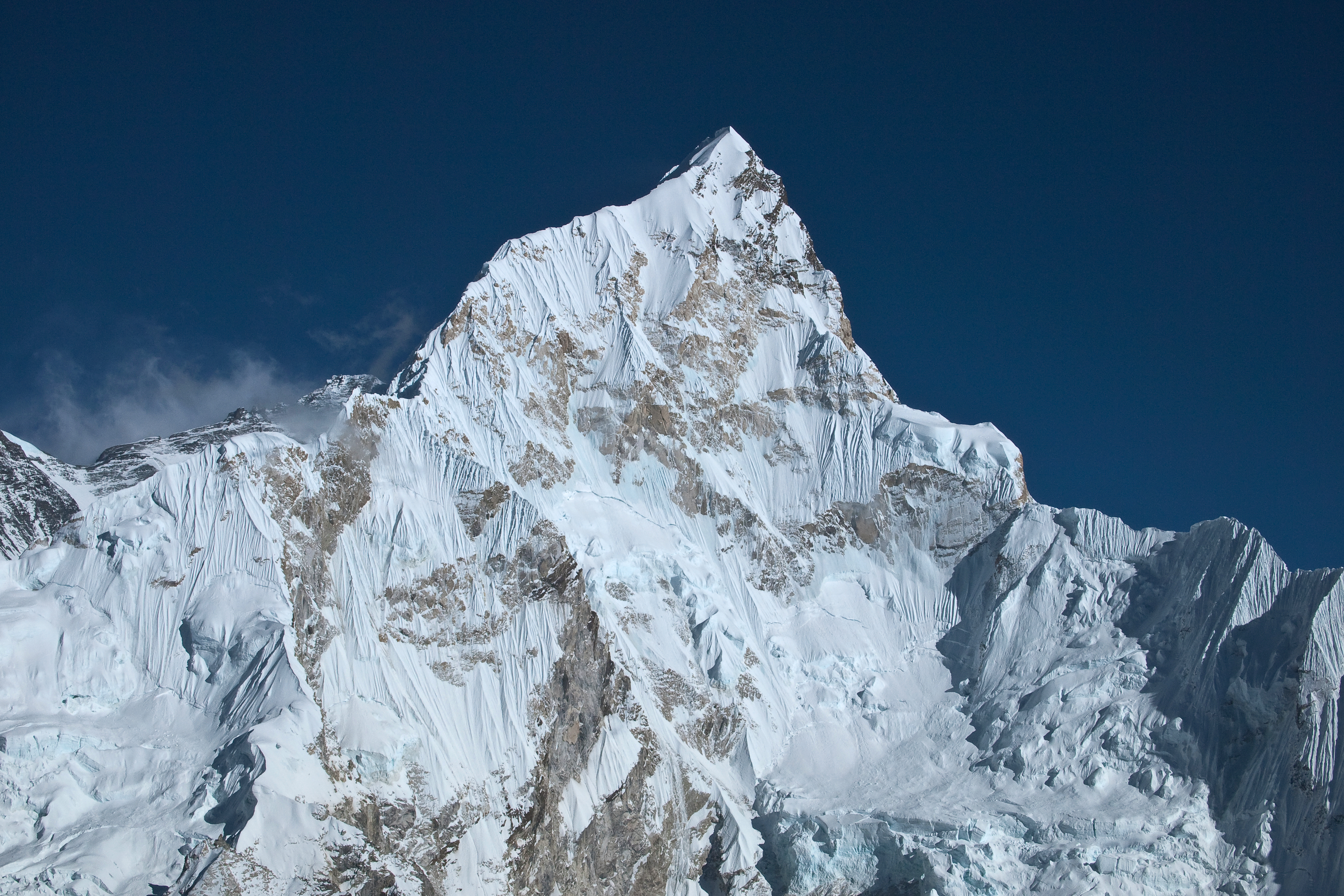
- Nuptse from Kala Patthar

Highest point
- Elevation: 7,861 m (25,791 ft)
- Prominence: 319 m (1,047 ft)
- Listing: Mountains of Nepal
- Coordinates: 27°57′59″N 86°53′24″E

Naming
- Native name: ནུབ་རྩེ། नुबचे (Sherpa)
- English translation: West Peak

Geography
- The major peaks (not mountains) above 7,500 m (24,600 ft) height in Himalayas, rank identified in Himalayas alone (not the world). Legend: 1：Mount Everest; 2：Kangchenjunga; 3：Lhotse; 4：Yalung Kang, Kanchenjunga West; 5：Makalu; 6：Kangchenjunga South; 7：Kangchenjunga Central; 8：Cho Oyu; 9：Dhaulagiri; 10：Manaslu (Kutang); 11：Nanga Parbat (Diamer); 12：Annapurna; 13：Shishapangma (Shishasbangma, Xixiabangma); 14：Manaslu East; 15：Annapurna East Peak; 16： Gyachung Kang; 17：Annapurna II; 18：Tenzing Peak (Ngojumba Kang, Ngozumpa Kang, Ngojumba Ri); 19：Kangbachen; 20：Himalchuli (Himal Chuli); 21：Ngadi Chuli (Peak 29, Dakura, Dakum, Dunapurna); 22：Nuptse (Nubtse); 23：Nanda Devi; 24：Chomo Lonzo (Chomolonzo, Chomolönzo, Chomo Lönzo, Jomolönzo, Lhamalangcho); 25：Namcha Barwa (Namchabarwa); 26：Zemu Kang (Zemu Gap Peak); 27：Kamet; 28：Dhaulagiri II; 29：Ngojumba Kang II; 30：Dhaulagiri III; 31：Kumbhakarna Mountain (Mount Kumbhakarna, Jannu); 32：Gurla Mandhata (Naimona'nyi, Namu Nan); 33：Hillary Peak (Ngojumba Kang III); 34：Molamenqing (Phola Gangchen); 35：Dhaulagiri IV; 36：Annapurna Fang; 37：Silver Crag; 38：Kangbachen Southwest; 39：Gangkhar Puensum (Gangkar Punsum); 40：Annapurna III; 41：Himalchuli West; 42：Annapurna IV; 43：Kula Kangri; 44：Liankang Kangri (Gangkhar Puensum North, Liangkang Kangri); 45：Ngadi Chuli South
- Location: Solukhumbu District, Sagarmatha Zone, Nepal
- Parent range: Mahalangur Himal, Himalayas

Climbing
- First ascent: 1961 by a British team led by Joe Walmsley
- Easiest route: snow/ice climb

Nuptse
- Chinese: 努子峰
Transcriptions

Nuptse or Nubtse (Note: Sherpa: ནུབ་རྩེ། नुबचे, Wylie: Nub rtse, Chinese: 努子峰) is a mountain in the Khumbu region of the Mahalangur Himal, a part of the Nepalese Himalayas. It lies 2 km (1.2 mi) to the southwest of Mount Everest. The main peak, Nuptse I with an elevation of 7,861 m (25,791 ft), was first climbed on May 16, 1961 by Dennis Davis and Sherpa Tashi. After a hiatus of almost 20 years, Nuptse became an objective of mountaineers again, with important routes being put up on its west, south, and north faces.

== Name ==
Nuptse is Tibetan for "west peak", as it is the western segment of the Lhotse-Nuptse massif.

== Geography ==
Nuptse lies 2 km (1.2 mi) WSW of Mount Everest. Due to the structure of the Everest Massif, Nuptse blocks Everest's view for much of the surrounding region. It is a dramatic peak when viewed from the south or west, and it towers above the base camp for the standard south col route on Everest. However, it is not a particularly independent peak: its topographic prominence is only 319 m (1,047 ft). Hence, it is not ranked in the list of highest mountains.

The main Nuptse ridge contains 7 summits:

Summit	Elevation	Latitude (N)	Longitude (E)
Nuptse I	7,861 m (25,791 ft)	27°57′59″	86°53′24″
Nuptse II	7,827 m (25,679 ft)	27°57′52″	86°53′34″
Nuptse Shar I	7,804 m (25,604 ft)	27°57′41″	86°53′47″
Nuptse Nup I	7,784 m (25,538 ft)	27°58′05″	86°53′08″
Nuptse Shar II	7,776 m (25,512 ft)	27°57′39″	86°53′55″
Nuptse Nup II	7,742 m (25,400 ft)	27°58′06″	86°52′54″
Nuptse Shar III	7,695 m (25,246 ft)	27°57′30″	86°54′42″

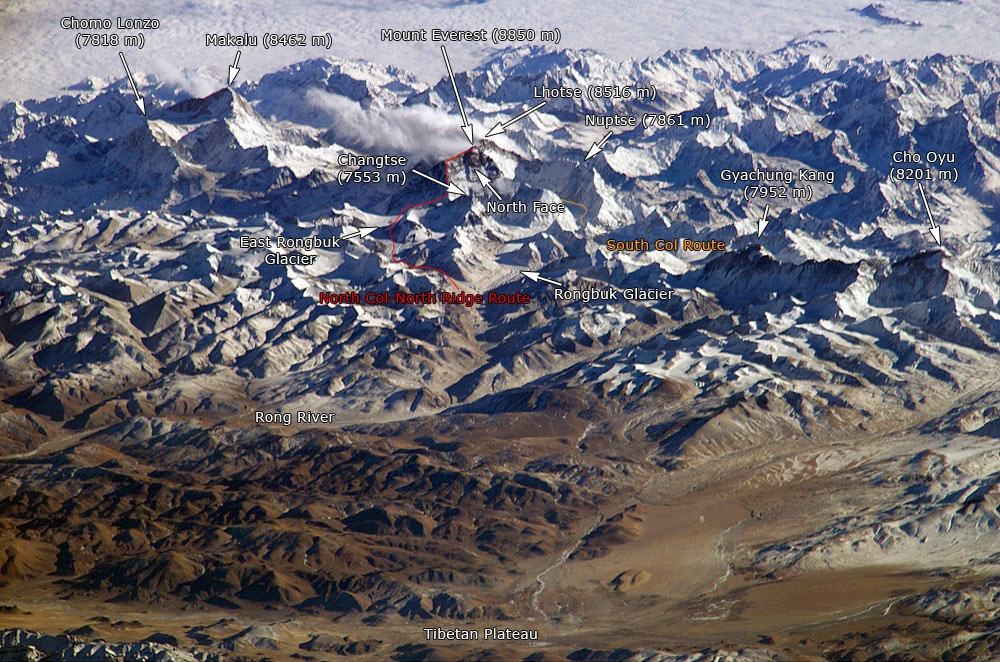

Southern and northern climbing routes as seen from the International Space Station (the names on the photo are links to corresponding pages).

== Climbing ==
Nuptse was first climbed in 1961 and subsequently climbed a few times:

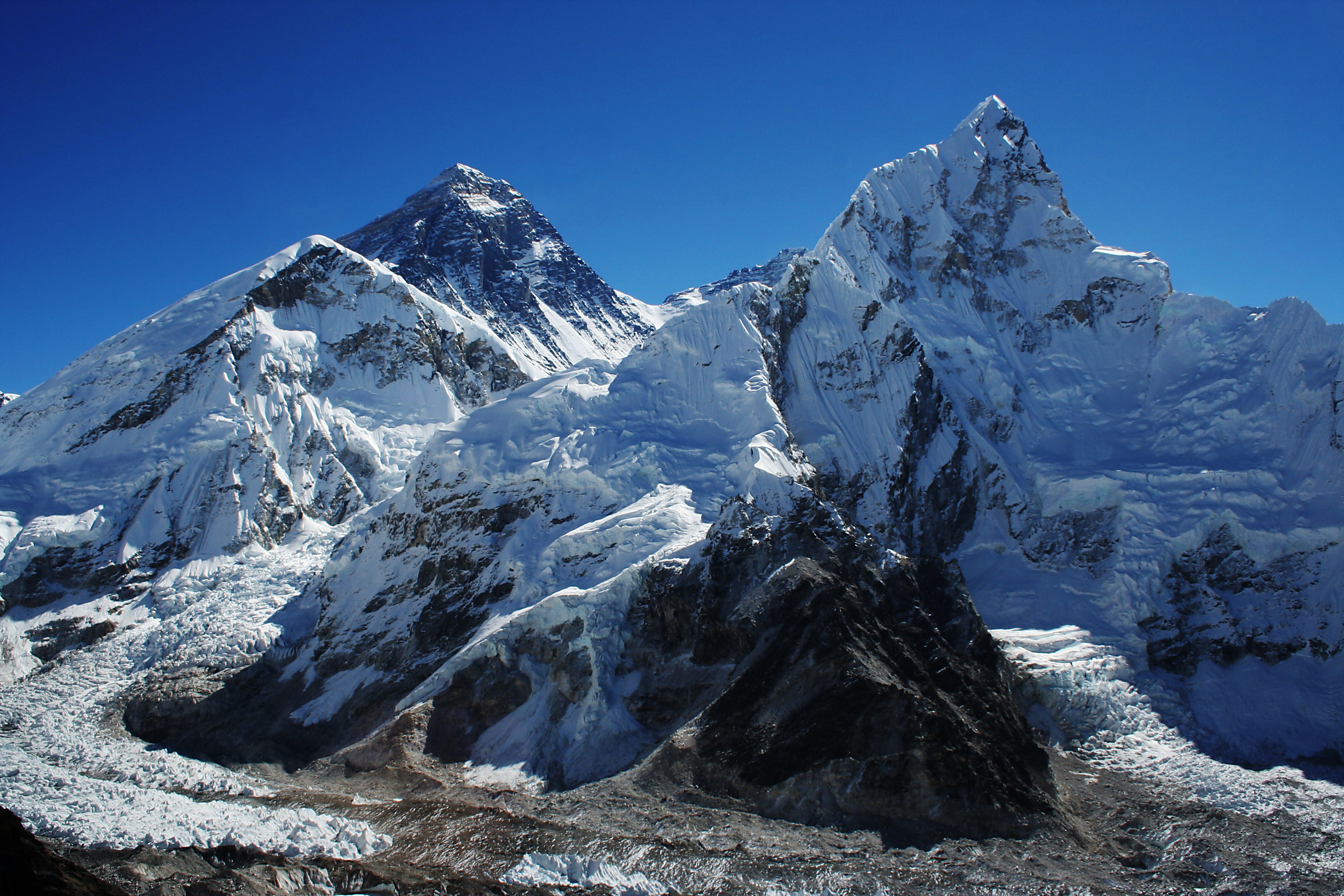
Nuptse on the right, Everest to the left

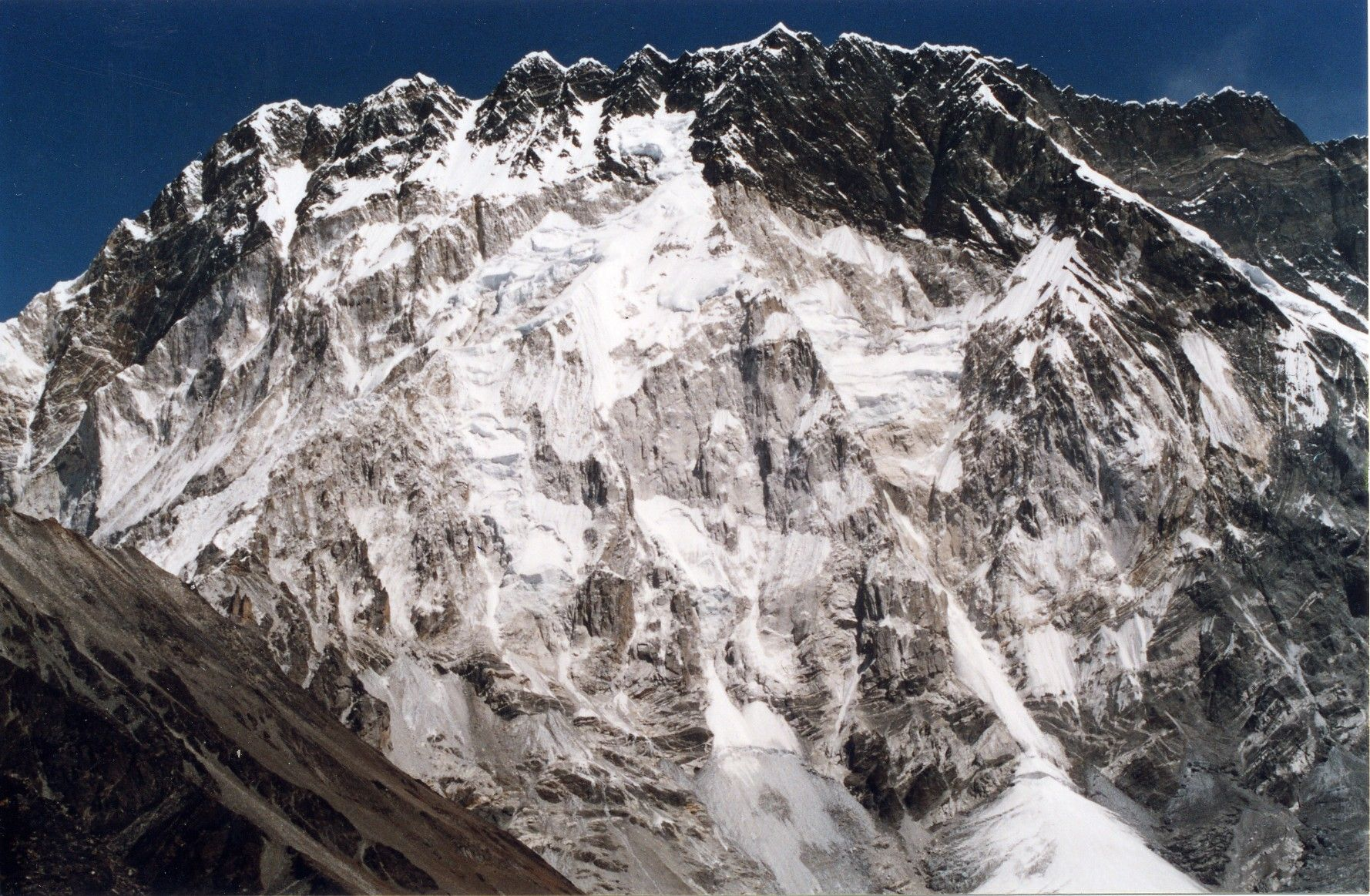
Nuptse from Chukhung Ri

- 1961 – First ascent of the North Ridge on May 16 by Dennis Davis and Sherpa Tashi as part of a British expedition led by Joe Walmsley. Tashi was the first human to set foot on the summit, while Davis waited to take photographs. Davis followed closely after Tashi. On May 17, other members of the same expedition reached the summit: Chris Bonington, Les Brown, James Swallow and Pemba Sherpa.
- 1975 – The Joint British Army-Royal Nepalese Army Nuptse Expedition in an attempt to be the second team atop Nuptse ended in tragedy with the loss of four climbers to falls: Major G.F. Owens and Captain R.A. Summerton, Lieutenant D.A.J. Brister and Rifleman Pasang Tamang.
- 1979 – Ascent of the North Ridge on October 19 by Georges Bettembourg, Doug Scott, Alan Rouse and Brian Hall.
- 1984 – First ascent of the West Ridge by Yvan Estienne, Rémi Roux, et al., an expedition led by Raymond Renaud.
- 1994 – First ascent of the south pillar of Nuptse Shar I by Frenchmen Michel Fauquet and Vincent Fine, who were stopped by the wind on the summit ridge 300 m (980 ft) from the summit. The climb was nominated for a Piolets d'Or.
- 1997 – Nuptse – Nup II (7742 m) – on top: Tomaž Humar, Janez Jeglič
- 2008 – Opening of the south face by Stéphane Benoist and Patrice Glairon-Rappaz; nominated for the Piolets d'Or in 2008.
- 2017 – Frédéric Degoulet, Benjamin Guigonnet and Hélias Millerioux open a route on the south face.
- 2023 – On 8 May, a team of 3 climbers from the US and 6 Sherpas were the first to reach the summit in the year. It is reported that at least 65 climbers in 6 teams have obtained permits for Nuptse.

== In culture ==
In 1987, Sally McCoy, Director of Equipment at The North Face, an American outdoor recreation products company, was part of the Snowbird Everest Expedition. This inspired The North Face to create outerwear named after the region's peaks and glaciers. In 1992, the company introduced the Nuptse Jacket. It featured a novel baffle construction to reduce shifting of the down and to increase warmth. The Nuptse jacket in bright colours was popular in New York City in the 1990s, especially among school kids and rappers. The Nuptse line of outdoors clothing has expanded to over 60 items in 2023.

== See also ==
- Ueli Steck, Swiss alpinist who died falling from Nuptse
