= Harry Taylor (mountaineer) =

Mountaineer, born 1958

- Born: 1958 (age 67–68)
- Known for: Former SAS, Technical advisor, mountaineer

Harry Taylor (born 20 September 1958) is a British mountaineer, security advisor and former SAS member. He founded ‘High Adventure’ with Loel Guinness, an extreme sports company specifically designed to set records in climbing, paragliding, and skydiving. His team set a world distance flight record for a paraglider at 150.6 km in Namibia. In 1991, with close friend Charles "Nish" Bruce he made a tandem skydive with oxygen from 27,000 feet over Badajoz in Spain. Taylor did a tandem paraglider flight from Cho Oyu 8,201m Tibet and was also the 1st British paraglider pilot to fly from Denali, Alaska.

Taylor began his career in the Royal Marines as an Arctic survival instructor, and later served with the British 22 SAS. In the late 1990s Taylor was Security Advisor to BP in Algeria, as well as to a number of world-renowned families. He also led an international investigation on human trafficking.

After his service in the SAS, he became an IFMGA Mountain Guide and in 1988 successfully completed the first traverse of the Three Pinnacles on Mount Everest’s ENE Ridge with Russell Brice. In 1993 he became the second Briton to have summited Mount Everest without supplementary oxygen. He has climbed on Everest 7 times with expeditions to N Face, ENE Ridge, N Ridge, SE Ridge winter and spring.

Taylor has guided wounded warriors to some of the world's highest summits as part of the Adaptive Grand Slam. The Adaptive Grand Slam (AGS) consists of seven of the world’s largest peaks in addition to the North and South Poles. The organisers and adventurers of these expeditions are ex-servicemen, living with various disabilities after being wounded in combat and who now aim to inspire others to do the ‘impossible’, whilst raising awareness for several charities. The Grand Slam is considered amongst seasoned mountain climbers and expedition leaders as the height of expedition achievement and the AGS team are unique in that they have to rely on alternative ways and means of completing the challenge with their various disabilities.

To date, the AGS team have reached the North Pole unsupported; the first disabled team to do so. Their first attempt at Everest in 2012 was unfortunately hampered by poor weather and avalanche warnings, however they successfully scaled Mount McKinley in 2013, Mont Blanc and Mount Elbrus in June 2014, adding the largest mountain in Europe to their list of successful feats. Their latest ascent was Mount Kilimanjaro in October 2014. Combined, these incredible undertakings have raised the profile of several charities that support people adjusting to life post injury.

Additionally, Taylor is a passionate wildlife conservationist and currently serves as the managing director for the Endangered Species Protection Agency. The Endangered Species Protection Agency works within International Law parameters and local enforcement procedures to conserve and protect critically endangered species. This includes but is not limited to: rhino, elephant, gorilla, orangutan and tiger.

Taylor was also an instructor at King Abdullah II Special Operations Training Center in Amman, Jordan.
