= Tootal =

British garment brand

- Product type: Scarves, ties, fabrics, accessories
- Current owner: Coats Viyella
- Country: United Kingdom
- Introduced: 1799
- Markets: Worldwide
- Previous owners: Robert Gardner (1799); Tootal Broadhurst Lee (1842); Tootal Ltd. (1973); Tootal Group plc (1985)
- Website: tootal.co.uk

Tootal is a brand name for a range of British ties, scarves and other garments. The brand is now owned by Coats Viyella. It originates from a textile spinning and manufacturing company established in Manchester in 1799, which later became Tootal Broadhurst Lee, and subsequently Tootal Ltd. The company held patents in crease-resistant fabric.

== History ==
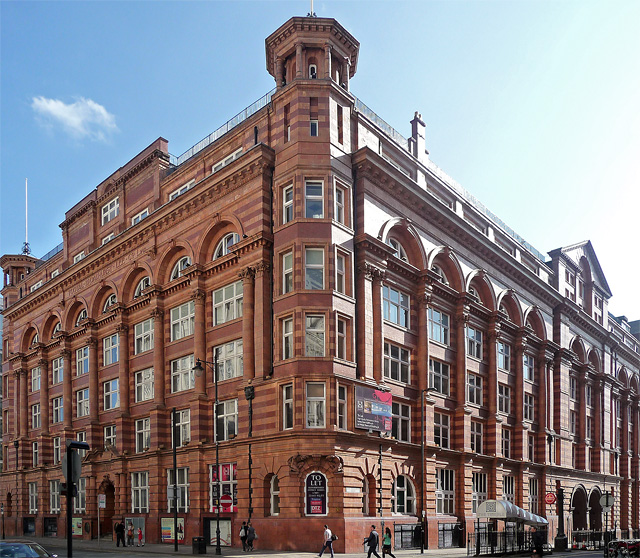
Churchgate House (former Tootal Broadhust Lee warehouse)

The firm identifies its origins in a company founded in Manchester in 1799 by textile merchant Robert Gardner. The Tootal family, who resided in Wakefield, Yorkshire, became involved in the company in the early nineteenth century. Sarah Tootal married Daniel Broadhurst in 1811, and their son Henry Tootal Broadhurst (1822-1896) – the brother of Charles Edward Broadhurst and brother-in-law of Sir Joseph Whitworth – established a business partnership in Manchester in 1842 with Edward Tootal and Henry Lee, who had worked in Gardner's cotton goods warehouse.

The partnership opened the Sunnybank cotton spinning and weaving mills, and became the largest manufacturer of hand looms in Blackburn, but the partnership was dissolved in 1860. The firm then developed the manufacture of fancy cloths, using steam-powered looms in place of hand looms, and acquired mills at Bolton and Newton Heath for their manufacture. In the 1860s, Henry Tootal Broadhurst, Henry and Joseph Lee, and Robert Scott, were business partners who formed a limited company, Tootal Broadhurst Lee, marketing their goods under the name Tootal.

The company was notable for its vertical integration, combining both spinning and weaving activities, and for its marketing network which included offices and warehouses in Bradford, Belfast and Paris, and national and international agencies promoting their goods. By 1888, when the joint stock company Tootal, Broadhurst, Lee and Company Ltd. was formed, the firm employed some 5,000 workers and operated 172,000 spindles and 3,500 looms, making it one of the largest integrated cotton textile producing companies in Lancashire. Sir Joseph Cocksey Lee (1832-1894), the brother of Henry Lee MP and later an active promoter of the Manchester Ship Canal, became its chairman. At the same time, a separate company, the Lee Spinning Co., was also established.

In 1898, the company opened a large new brick-clad warehouse and office block, now known as Churchgate House, in Oxford Street, Manchester. The building, designed by Joseph Gibbons Sankey, is now a Grade II* listed building, described as "a powerful monument to the entrepreneurialism of the Industrial Revolution and Victorian bombast." Plans in the 1930s to build an adjoining warehouse which would have been the tallest building in Europe at the time were never completed.

Tootal, Broadhurst, Lee continued to develop in the late nineteenth and early twentieth centuries, and in 1907 Edward Tootal Broadhurst, the son of Henry Tootal Broadhurst, succeeded Harold Lee (the son of Henry Lee) as chairman. The company was an innovator in its promotion of brand names, and in selling its goods direct to retailers. Though early in its history it specialised in cotton fabrics, it later diversified into other yarns including silk and rayon. It developed a range of fabrics in a wide variety of patterns, including a velvet marketed as "Tootal cloth", and "Tarantulle", used for lingerie and baby wear, as well as focussing on products such as handkerchiefs, scarves and ties. The company provided neckerchiefs and other items for soldiers in the Boer War. A research department was established, and it was active in developing new innovations, such as crease-resistant fabrics. In the early 1920s, it took out patents on urea-formaldehyde resins to produce crease-resistant fabrics, and commercialised its patents by developing an international licensing programme, with successful agencies being granted the use of the Tebilized registered trade mark.

In the First World War the company was noted for giving early guarantees that all their men returning after service would be reinstated in their old positions. By 1939, Tootal had branches throughout Britain and subsidiaries in Argentina, Australia, Canada, France, and New Zealand, as well as agencies throughout the world. The company participated in the 1947 British Industries Fair, and featured its "Lystav, Robia and Tobralco patented dress and furnishing fabrics, Pyramid men’s handkerchiefs and a bright display of Tootal ties and scarves." New factories were opened in St Helens in 1947, and in Devonport, Tasmania, in 1952. In the 1960s, Tootal joined the English Sewing Cotton Co., and later the Calico Printers' Association, becoming English Calico Ltd. which was renamed Tootal Ltd. in 1973. In 1985 it became Tootal Group plc, and in 1991 was acquired by Coats Viyella, which disposed of several of its subsidiaries.

== In fashion ==
Tootal scarves and ties in polka dot, Paisley and other patterns are now regarded as iconic of the period between the 1920s and 1950s in Britain, when they were advertised widely with the slogan: "Every Man Needs… Tootal Ties". They were associated with the mod subculture in the 1960s, were again revived as fashion accessories in the 1980s and 2000s, and are now seen as emblematic of classic British men's fashion.
