= Church of St Mary the Virgin, Bowdon =

Coordinates: 53.3781°N 2.3644°W

Church of St Mary the Virgin
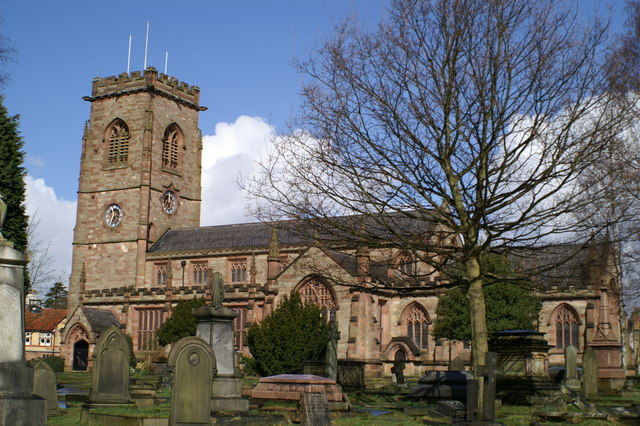
- Church of St Mary the Virgin, from the southwest in 2006

- Location in Greater Manchester
- OS grid reference: SJ 758 868
- Location: Bowdon, Altrincham, Greater Manchester
- Country: England
- Denomination: Anglican
- Website: St Mary, Bowdon

History
- Status: Parish church
- Dedication: Virgin Mary

Architecture
- Functional status: Active
- Heritage designation: Grade II*
- Designated: 12 July 1985
- Architect: W. H. Brakspear
- Architectural type: Church
- Style: Gothic Revival
- Completed: 1860

Specifications
- Materials: Sandstone, slate roof

Administration
- Province: York
- Diocese: Chester
- Archdeaconry: Macclesfield
- Deanery: Bowdon
- Parish: Bowdon

Clergy
- Vicar: Revd Dr Andrew Knight

The Church of St Mary the Virgin is in the village and electoral ward of Bowdon near Altrincham, Greater Manchester, England. It is recorded in the National Heritage List for England (NHLE) as a designated Grade II* listed building. It is an active Anglican parish church in the Diocese of Chester, the archdeaconry of Macclesfield and the deanery of Bowdon.

== History ==
The presence of a church on the site was noted in the Domesday Book (1086). It is likely that a new church was built in the 14th century and remodelled in the 16th century. The church was completely rebuilt between 1858 and 1860 by W. H. Brakspear, although the 16th-century roofs of the aisles were retained and incorporated into the new structure.

== Architecture ==
=== Exterior ===
The church is built in pink and contrasting red Runcorn sandstone with a slate roof. Its plan consists of a west tower, a six-bay nave with clerestory, north and south aisles, north and south transepts, and a chancel with an organ loft and vestry on the north side, and a chapel on the south. The tower is in four stages and has diagonal buttresses, ornate clock faces, four-light belfry openings, gargoyles, and its top is castellated. The aisles and clerestory are also castellated. The transepts have corner pinnacles.

== Interior ==
The 16th-century roofs of the aisles are camber beam in type and are elaborately carved with bosses and coats of arms. The nave roof is hammerbeam in type. In the north transept is an altar table from the early 18th century and a chest dated 1635. The sanctuary chairs are Jacobean and a 15th-century octagonal font has been placed in the north aisle.

In the medieval church there were many tombs, and some of these have been included in the present church. The oldest are a pair of damaged reclining effigies in the north transept, one of which is of Sir William Baguley who died in about 1320. Also in the north transept is the Brereton monument, with recumbent effigies of William Brereton who died in 1630 and his wife Jane, under a canopy. On the side of the tomb are kneeling figures of their seven children. In the chapel are two memorials by André Carpentière. One is to Henry Booth, 1st Earl of Warrington who died in 1694, his wife Mary and their family, which includes figures of Wisdom and Vanity. The other is to Langham Booth who died in 1724, and to Henry Booth who died in 1727. A mural tablet to the Asshetons is by Richard Westmacott.

In the north transept is a collection of loose carved stones some of which are from the Norman period. In the church is stained glass by Kempe and by Clutterbuck. The pulpit, dating from around 1910, is by Temple Moore. The three-manual organ was built in 1875 and minor alterations were made to it in 1960 by J. W. Walker & Sons Ltd. The parish registers begin in 1628. There is a ring of eight bells, cast in 1964 by John Taylor & Co.

== External features ==
In the churchyard are three structures that are designated as Grade II listed buildings. One is a sandstone sundial post of uncertain date, which consists of an octagonal shaft on a square base. There is a sandstone war memorial dating from around 1920 by Arthur Hennings. The third structure consists of the piers, railings and walls surrounding the churchyard. The churchyard also contains the war graves of twelve soldiers of the First World War, and an airman of the Second World War.

== See also ==
- Grade II* listed buildings in Greater Manchester
- Listed buildings in Bowdon, Greater Manchester
- List of churches in Greater Manchester
- List of church fittings and furniture by Temple Moore
