= Andy Kirkpatrick =

British mountaineer and author

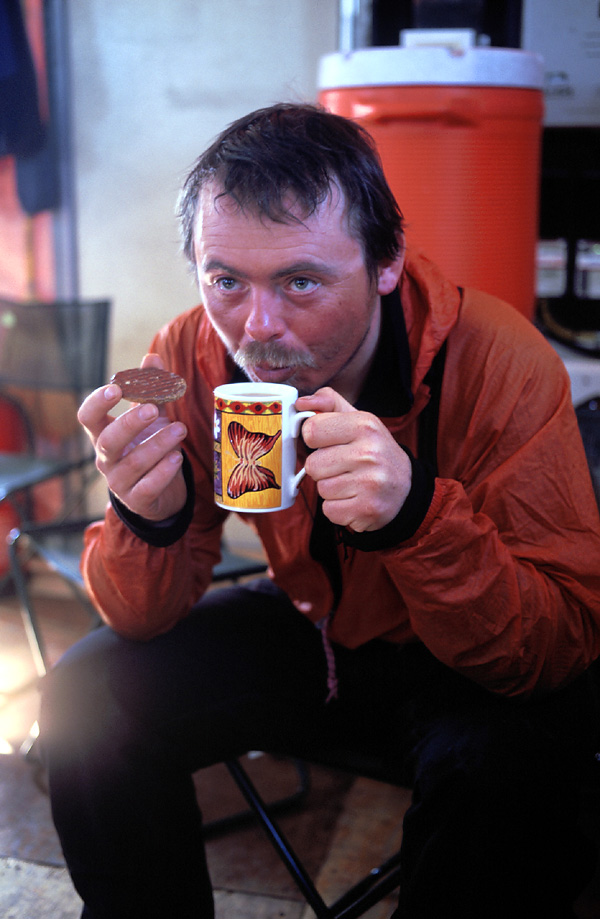
- Andy Kirkpatrick in Greenland, 2006

Personal information
- Nationality: British
- Born: 24 June 1971 (age 55) Hull, East Riding of Yorkshire, England
- Occupations: climber, motivational speaker, writer
- Website: andy-kirkpatrick.com

Climbing career
- Type of climber: Aid climbing; Big wall climbing; Alpine climbing; Rope solo climbing; Solo climbing

Andrew Kirkpatrick is a British mountaineer, author, motivational speaker and monologist. He is best known as a big wall climber, having scaled Yosemite's El Capitan over 30 times, including five solo ascents, and two one-day ascents, as well as climbing in Patagonia, Alaska, Antarctica and the Alps. He has also crossed Greenland by ski. In 2014 he guided Alex Jones up Moonlight Buttress, Zion National Park, raising £1.9 million for Sport Relief.

== Film, TV and radio ==
Kirkpatrick has worked in film and TV as a safety advisor and stunt rigger, including Charlie and the Chocolate Factory, as well as in programmes for CBBC, ITN, BBC and BBC Scotland. The BBC programme "The Big Climb" about his ascent of El Capitan with his 13-year-old daughter Ella won multiple awards. In 2014, he guided the TV presenter Alex Jones up the Moonlight Buttress in Zion National Park to raise money for Sports Relief, raising £1.9 million. In 2014, Kirkpatrick gave a fifteen-minute talk on BBC Radio 4 in its Four Thought slot on the subject of the importance of risky play for children. In January 2015, he followed the route of the heroes of telemark on the Hardangervidda by ski with his two children for a BBC film on risky play.

== Writing ==
Kirkpatrick's dyslexia is well documented, and these struggles form part of his first book, Psychovertical.

Kirkpatrick is only the third person to win the Boardman Tasker Prize for Mountain Literature twice (Paul Pritchard and Jim Perrin being the other authors to win twice). His first win was with his first book, Psychovertical in 2008 and his second with his book, Cold Wars: Climbing the fine line between risk and reality.

Psychovertical has been translated into German (published in 2010 as Psychovertikal by AS Verlag), Polish, Italian and Korean. The Italian version was published in 2011 as Psychovertical by Edizioni Versante Sud and in 2012 won the literary prize Gambrinus "Giuseppe Mazzotti". It is also published in French.

== Bibliography ==
- Down, Akreative, 2020, ISBN 978-1999700577
- Psychovertical, London: Hutchinson, 2008, ISBN 978-0-09-192096-8, ISBN 0-09-192096-5
- Unknown Pleasures, Vertebrate, 2018, ISBN 978-1911342724
- Higher Education, Akreative, 2018, ISBN 978-1999700591
- 30 Years of Climbing Magazine, Climbing Magazine, 1999, ISBN 978-1-893682-02-3
- Cold Wars, Vertebrate, 2011, ISBN 978-1906148461
- Zimne Wojny by Taschenbuch ISBN 978-8361050957
- Kalte Kriege, AS Verlag, 2012, ISBN 978-3906055015
- Cold Wars, The Mountaineers, USA, ISBN 978-1594857430
- 1000+ Climbing Tips Akreative ISBN 978-1484854013
- Nutcraft Akreative ASIN: B00F8CVQ0S
- Hooks Akreative ASIN: B008LZRO0A
- Driven Akreative ISBN 978-1491036174

== See also ==
- Rope solo climbing
