= Mick Fowler =

British mountain and alpine climber

Personal information
- Born: 1956 (age 69–70) Wembley, England
- Occupation: Tax inspector (retired)

Climbing career
- Type of climber: Traditional climbing; Big wall climbing; Alpine climbing; Ice climbing; Mixed climbing
- Highest grade: Onsight/Flash: E6 6b 7a+ (5.12a)
- First ascents: Linden (E6 6b, 1976); The Shield Direct (VII/7, 1979); Golden Pillar Spantik (ED+, 1987); N Pillar Taweche (ED+, 1995); NW Arwa Tower (ED+, 1999); NW Singuniang (ED+, 2002); Prow of Shiva (ED+, 2012); N Gave Ding (ED+, 2016)
- Known for: Three time winner of the Piolet d'Or; First British climber to climb at rock grade E6; First climber to register a Scottish winter grade VI ice route
- Updated on 5 August 2023

Michael Fowler (born 1956) is a British rock climber, ice climber, mountaineer and climbing author. He is internationally noted for his alpine climbing and was awarded the Piolet d'Or three times, with Paul Ramsden, in 2003, 2013, and 2016, for alpine-style first ascents of faces in the Himalayas. Fowler was one of the first British rock climbers to free an E6-graded traditional rock climbing route (Linden, 1976), and the first ice climber to free a consensus grade VI mixed Scottish winter route (The Shield Direct, 1979).

In the British Isles, Fowler is also noted for unusual and esoteric climbing including crumbling sea cliffs and sea stacks and using mixed climbing techniques on chalk cliffs. In 1989, Fowler was voted the "Mountaineers' Mountaineer" in a poll of his peers by The Observer. Fowler stayed as an amateur climber and maintained a full-time job in the HM Revenue and Customs for almost forty years. Many of Fowler's awards were earned climbing Himalayan peaks during his annual holiday leave from the Revenue.

== Climbing career ==
In 1976, Fowler became one of the first climbers in Britain to make a first free ascent (FFA) of a traditional climbing route at the E6-grade of difficulty when he freed Linden on the "Eliminates Wall" at Curbar Edge. In 1979, Fowler also became the first British climber to ascend a mixed climbing route at a consensus Scottish winter grade VI of difficulty (i.e. formally registered in the guidebook) when he freed The Shield Direct with Victor Saunders on Ben Nevis; it later turned out to be grade VII/7 route.

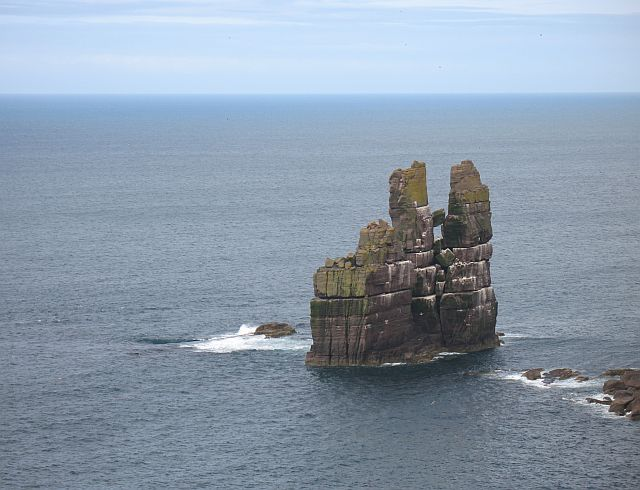
Stack Clò Kearvaig, a sea stack climbed by Fowler

Fowler was a pioneer of unusual and adventurous climbs, including multi-pitch climbing on crumbling British sea cliffs and sea stacks, and using mixed climbing techniques on chalk cliffs on England's southeast coast. The Stack Rock (2020) guidebook for sea stacks in the British Isles, identifies the era of "Fowler's forrays" from 1986 to 1993, as being one of the most important in the development of sea stack climbing, including his "outrageous" 1991 ascent of The Needle on Hoy (XS 5c). Fowler famously ice-climbed a 65-foot (20 m) frozen water icicle from a broken toilet at St Pancras.

It is for alpine climbing that Fowler came to international recognition and the application of the alpine style (i.e. small teams carrying all their own equipment with no support) to high-altitude Himalayan faces. In his autobiography, Fowler recounts that by 1981, he completed his "tick list" of the European alpine classic north faces including the Walker Spur (1979) and the north faces of the Eiger (1980) and the Matterhorn (1980), when he met Alan Rouse who recommended he leave Europe and visit Peru. Fowler took his advice and learned to squeeze more ambitious expeditions into his 30-day annual leave from the Revenue. By 1987, Fowler and Victor Saunders, won international acclaim for their groundbreaking alpine-style ascent of the "Golden Pillar" on Spantik in the Karakoram (Fowler called it the "Walker Spur" of the Himalaya), as a milestone in high-altitude climbing.

After the success of the "Golden Pillar", Fowler continued to focus on making important alpine-style ascents of high-altitude Himalayan new routes including the Northeast Buttress of Taweche (1995) and the Northwest Face of Arwa Tower (1999). In 2003, Fowler and climbing partner Paul Ramsden, won the Piolet d'Or for their 2002 alpine-style ascent of the Northwest face of Siguniang; they were the first British climbers to win mountaineering's most prestigious award. The duo would win a second Piolet d'Or for their 2012 alpine-style ascent of the dramatic Northeast Buttress (the "Prow") of Mount Shiva. In 2016, they won a third Piolet d'Or for their alpine-style ascent of North Face of Gave Ding.

=== Other climbing ===
In 2010, Fowler was elected to serve as president of the Alpine Club, which was a 3-year term from 2011 to 2013, after beating Henry Day in the first-ever contested election in the organization's 153-year history. In 2014, Fowler was appointed as a Patron of the British Mountaineering Council.

== Climbing author ==
Fowler has written three books on his climbs and life as a climber, Vertical Pleasure: The Secret Life of a Taxman (1995), On Thin Ice (2005), and No Easy Way (2018); all three were shortlisted for the Boardman Tasker Prize for Mountain Literature (never winning outright). Fowler won the Jon Whyte Award for Mountain Literature at the 2005 Banff Mountain Book Festival for On Thin Ice, and a compilation of Fowler's writings about his climbs with Victor Saunders by Eric Vola, titled Les Tribulations de Mick et Vic, won the Grand Prix Award at the Passy Book Festival in France in 2015.

== Legacy ==
In a 1989 poll carried out by the British newspaper, The Observer, amongst British climbers, Fowler was voted the "mountaineer's mountaineer". In 2005, Chris Bonington elaborated on The Observer poll saying "... it reflected climber approval of his highly original approach to the sport – explorations on chalk sea cliffs, alpine north faces, Scottish crags in winter and summer, and his first expeditions to major ranges which resulted in superb climbs ...". Bonington said Fowler had delivered on this early vote of confidence by becoming "one of our greatest mountaineers". Fowler, with climbing partner Paul Ramsden, won the Piolet d'Or three times, a feat achieved by only four climbers.

In 2005, The Telegraph said he was considered "a legend by other climbers, not least because of his ability to climb hard and remote mountains", but that by remaining an "amateur climber", he achieved his reputation on "all in the annual 30 days he gets off work". In 2018, The Sunday Times newspaper called him "the world's greatest amateur climber". Fowler said that he avoided the eight-thousander peaks as the circa 8-weeks of acclimatization would not fit into his 30 days of yearly holiday allowance from his full-time job. He said that he had considered turning professional at times, but that he was concerned more regular exposure to climbing would dull his enthusiasm for the sport.

== Personal life ==
For almost 40 years from 1977 to his retirement, Fowler worked full-time for HM Revenue and Customs rising to the position of Assistant Director in the Shares and Assets Valuation Division, which is based in Nottingham (Fowler relocated from the Revenue in London in the early 1990s);

Fowler married his wife Nicki, they have two children.

In 2017, Fowler underwent treatment for anal cancer which required him to use a colostomy bag; however this did not stop him from climbing in the Himalayas in 2019, and on make first ascents of new routes on sea stacks off the Irish coast in 2023.

== Notable ascents ==
=== Traditional climbing ===
- 1976: Linden E6 6b at Curbar Edge; First free ascent (FFA) of Drummond's controversial aid route, and one of the first E6 routes in Britain.
- 1977: Stairway to Heaven (4-pitches) E5 6a on Blà Bheinn, Skye. FFA with Phil Thomas.
- 1978: Ludwig (3-pitches) E6 6b at Gogarth South Stack; First ascent but with 3-points of aid, FFA by Andy Pollitt in 1984.
- 1981: Stone (6-pitches) E5 6a on Sron Ulladail in the Hebrides. FFA with Andy Meyers.
- 1982: Caveman (6-pitches) E6 6b in Berry Head, Devon. FFA with Andy Meyers; led onsight.

=== Ice and mixed climbing ===
- 1978: Cascade (WI5, V 5) on Craig Rhaeddr, North Wales. First ascent.
- 1979: Central Ice-fall Direct (WI6, VI 6) on Craig Rhaeddr, North Wales. First ascent and one of the best-regarded WI6 routes in Britain.
- 1979: The Shield Direct (VII 7) on Ben Nevis. First ascent, and the first Scottish winter route to be given a guidebook rating of "VI".
- 1983: The Fly Direct (VII 6) on Creag Meagaidh. First ascent with Victor Saunders.
- 1983: Gully of the Gods (VI 6) in Applecross. First ascent.
- 1987: West Central Gully (VII 8) on Beinn Eighe. First ascent and for a time was one of the hardest mixed climbing routes in Britain.
- 1991: Deep Gash Gully (VI 7) on Sgùrr a' Mhadaidh, Skye. First ascent.

=== Mountaineering and alpine climbing ===
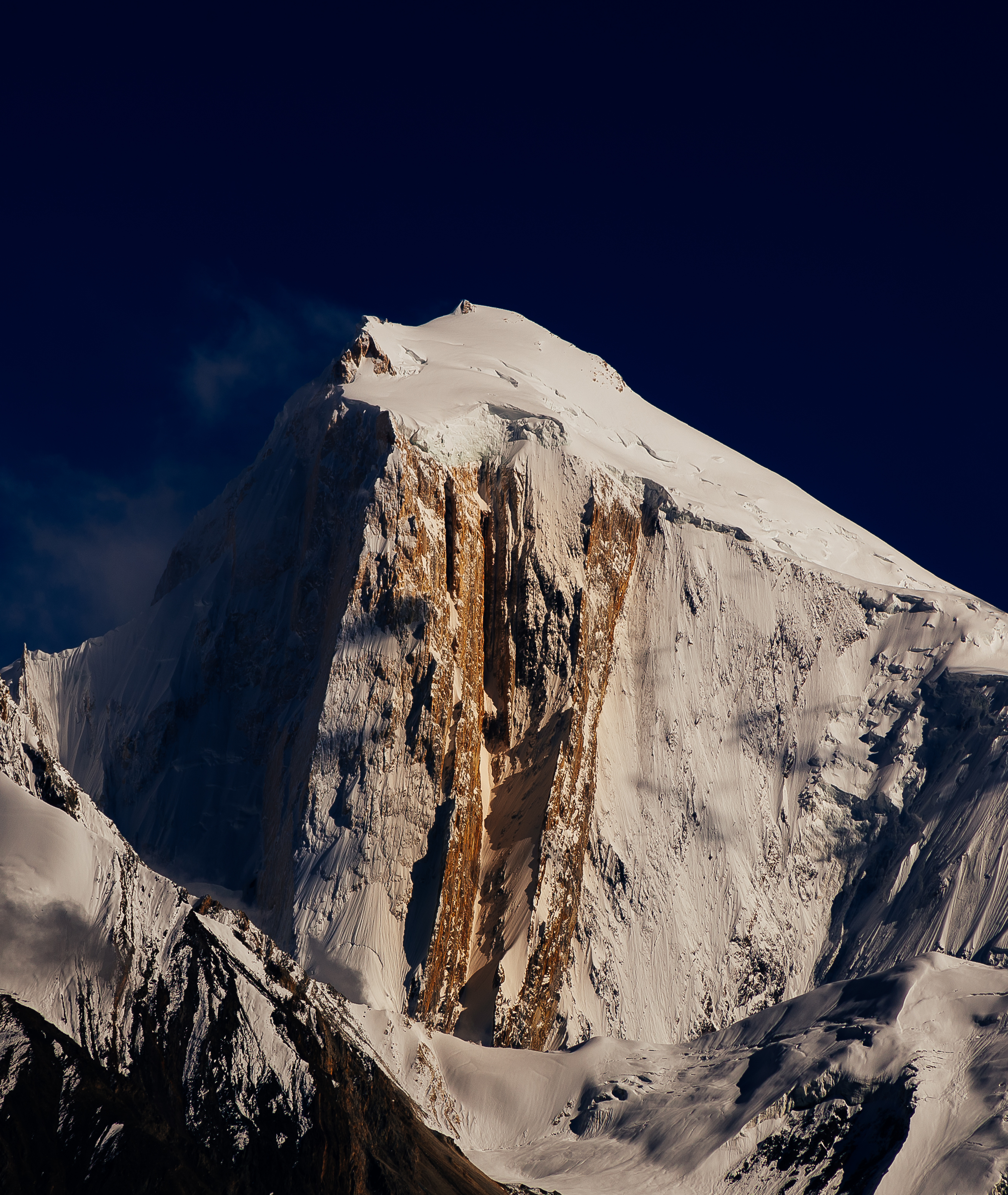
The shining cristalized marble Golden Pillar of Spantik (centre)

- 1982 South Face of Taulliraju (ED3, V A3+ WI6, 800m, Peru). FA with Chris Watts; Fowler's first expedition outside of Europe, done alpine style.
- 1983 Western Gully of Kilimanjaro (Tanzania), with Caradog Jones.
- 1986 West Face Direct of Ushba (Rus 5b, Scottish V, 1,600m, Caucasus). FA with Victor Saunders.
- 1987 Golden Pillar Buttress of Spantik (2,200m, Scottish V/VI, Pakistan). FA with Victor Saunders and Fowler's first major Himalayan ascent; considered a groundbreaking alpine style Himalayan ascent.
- 1991 Southwest Ridge of Hunza Peak and Bublimating (Pakistan). FA of Hunza with Caradog Jones.
- 1993 Northwest Face of Cerro Kishtwar (ED+, A3 Scottish VI, 1,300m, India). FA with Steve Sustad.
- 1995 Northeast Buttress of Taweche (ED+, VI E3 A2, Nepal). FA with Pat Littlejohn; considered a major alpine style Himalayan ascent that further cemented Fowler's credentials in high-altitude alpinism.
- 1997 North Face of Changabang (TD+, Scottish VI, 1,600m, India). FA with Brendan Murphy and Andy Cave (summit); with Fowler and Steve Sustad climbing to the summit ridge. Murphy was hit by an avalanche and swept off the face to his death on the descent; the only death Fowler experienced on his expeditions.
- 1999 Northwest Face of Arwa Tower (ED+, VI 5b A3 Scottish V/VI, 1,000m, India). FA with Steve Sustad; a major alpine style Himalayan ascent of a much-admired face.
- 2000 North Buttress of Mount Kennedy (TD+, 1,800m, Yukon US). FA of 1968 aid route with Andy Cave having retreated from the Northwest face.
- 2002 Northwest face of Siguniang (ED+, VII AI6 M6, 1,500m, Sichuan). FA with Paul Ramsden; they won the 2003 Piolet d'Or for this climb.
- 2005 West Face of Kajaqiao (TD+, Scottish V, 1,100m, Tibet). FA with Chris Watts; a permit mixup led them to Kajaqiao instead of Manamcho.
- 2007 Northwest Ridge of Manamcho (TD, Scottish V, 700m, Tibet). FA with Paul Ramsden; known as the Matterhorn of the Nyenchen Tanglha.
- 2010 North Face of Sulamar (TD+, 1,600m, Xinjiang, China). FA with Paul Ramsden.
- 2011 West face of Mugu Chuli (or Mt. Gojung) (ED, 1,200m, Nepal/Tibet). FA with Dave Turnbull.
- 2012 Northeast Buttress ("Prow") of Shiva (ED+, 700m, India) with Paul Ramsden; they won the 2013 Piolet d'Or for this climb, their second.
- 2013 Southwest Face of Kishtwar Kailash (ED, Scottish VI, 1,500m, India). FA with Paul Ramsden.
- 2014 Northeast Face Hagshu (ED, 1,300m, India). FA with Paul Ramsden.
- 2015 North Face of Gave Ding (ED+, 1,600m, Nepal). FA with Paul Ramsden; they won the 2016 Piolet d'Or for this, which was their third.
- 2016 North Face of Sersank Peak (ED, 1,100m, India). FA with Victor Saunders.
- 2024 First ascent of Yawash Sar (6,258m, Karakoram). FA with Victor Saunders.

== Awards and honours ==
=== For climbing ===
- Golden Piton Award (Alpine) in 2002 for Siguniang.
- Piolet d'Or in 2003 (for Siguniang), 2013 (for Shiva), and 2016 (for Gave Ding).
- King Albert Mountain Award in 2012.
- Appointed as a Patron of the British Mountaineering Council in 2014.
- Honorary Fellow of University of Cumbria in 2016.

=== For writing ===
- W.H. Murray Literary Prize in 2002 for his essay Climbing in the Cold on Scottish winter climbing.
- John White Award, Banff Mountain Book Festival in 2005, for his book On Thin Ice: Alpine Climbs in the Americas, Asia and the Himalaya.
- Grand Prix Award, Passy Book Festival in France in 2015, for compilation of Fowler's writings by Eric Vola as Les Tribulations de Mick et Vic.

== Bibliography ==
=== Books ===
- Fowler, Mick (2018). No Easy Way: The challenging life of the climbing taxman. Vertebrate Publishing. ISBN 978-1-911342-75-5.
- Fowler, Mick (2006). Vertical Pleasure: Early Climbs in Britain, the Alps, the Andes and the Himalaya (reprint ed.). Baton Wicks. ISBN 1-898573-67-0.
- Fowler, Mick (2005). On Thin Ice: Alpine Climbs in the Americas, Asia and the Himalaya. Baton Wicks. ISBN 1-898573-58-1.
- Fowler, Mick (1995). Vertical Pleasure: The Secret Life of a Tax Man. London: Hodder & Stoughton. ISBN 0-340-62321-7.

=== Journals ===
- Fowler, Mick (1998). "A Touch Too Much?". American Alpine Journal. 40 (72). Golden, CO, USA: American Alpine Club: 53–68. ISBN 0-930410-78-5.
- Fowler, Mick (2002). "Climbing in the Cold" (PDF). The W.H. Murray Literary Prize 2002. Scottish Mountaineering Club.
