= Ed Douglas =

British writer and journalist

- Born: 1966 (age 59–60); United Kingdom
- Education: Manchester University
- Occupations: Writer; Journalist

Ed Douglas (born 1966) is a writer and journalist from the United Kingdom. Douglas is also an amateur climber and mountain traveller, with a particular interest in the Himalaya.

== Works ==
Douglas is an author of thirteen books about mountains and their people. These include the first full-length biography of Tenzing Norgay, who climbed Mount Everest with Sir Edmund Hillary in 1953. He covered the Nepali civil war for The Observer and National Geographic and interviewed the 14th Dalai Lama for The Guardian. As of April 2023, Douglas had made over forty visits to the Himalayas, including a dozen mountaineering expeditions. Douglas is a regular contributor to British radio and television and was a consultant on the BAFTA-nominated film Sherpa. He is a former editor of the Alpine Journal and has written for Climber magazine. He has been a contributor to The Guardian for thirty years, and writes a column for the paper’s Country Diary. Douglas ghosted Leo Dickinson's 1993 book Ballooning over Everest.

=== Awards ===
Douglas won the 1994 Outdoor Writer's Guild Award for his profile of rock climber Ron Fawcett. His ghost-written autobiography of Ron Fawcett, Rock Athlete, won the Boardman Tasker Prize for Mountain Literature in 2010. His book The Magician's Glass was shortlisted for the 2017 Boardman Tasker Prize. His book Himalaya: a Human History won a Special Jury Mention in the 2020 Banff Mountain Book Festival. His book Upland won the Boardman Tasker Prize for Mountain Literature in 2026.

== Personal life ==
Douglas studied English at Manchester University, where he launched the On the Edge magazine. He lives in Sheffield with his wife Kate, a science editor, and two children.

== Selected bibliography ==
- Dickinson, Leo with Ed Douglas. (1993) Ballooning over Everest. Jonathan Cape.
- Douglas, Ed. (2003). Tenzing: Hero of Everest, a Biography of Tenzing Norgay. National Geographic.
- Douglas, Ed and Kate Douglas. (2009). The Camping Book: stay dry, keep warm, and eat great food. Dorling Kindersley.
- Fawcett, Ron with Ed Douglas. (2011). Ron Fawcett-Rock Athlete: The Story of a Climbing Legend. Vertebrate Publishing.
- Douglas, Ed. (2014). Chomolungma Sings the Blues: Travels around Everest. Constable and Robinson.
- Douglas, Ed. (2015). Statement: the Ben Moon Story. Vertebrate Publishing.
- Douglas, Ed. (2017). The Magician's Glass: Character and Fate: eight essays on climbing and mountain life. Vertebrate Digital.
- Rose, David and Ed Douglas (2019). Regions of the Heart: The triumph and tragedy of Alison Hargreaves. Penguin Books.
- Douglas, Ed. (2020). Himalaya: a Human History. Random House.
- Douglas, Ed. (2026). Upland.
