= National Assembly Library of Korea =

Public library in Seoul, South Korea

Coordinates: 37°31′52.2″N 126°55′01.8″E

National Assembly Library of the Republic of Korea 대한민국 국회도서관 大韓民國 國會圖書館
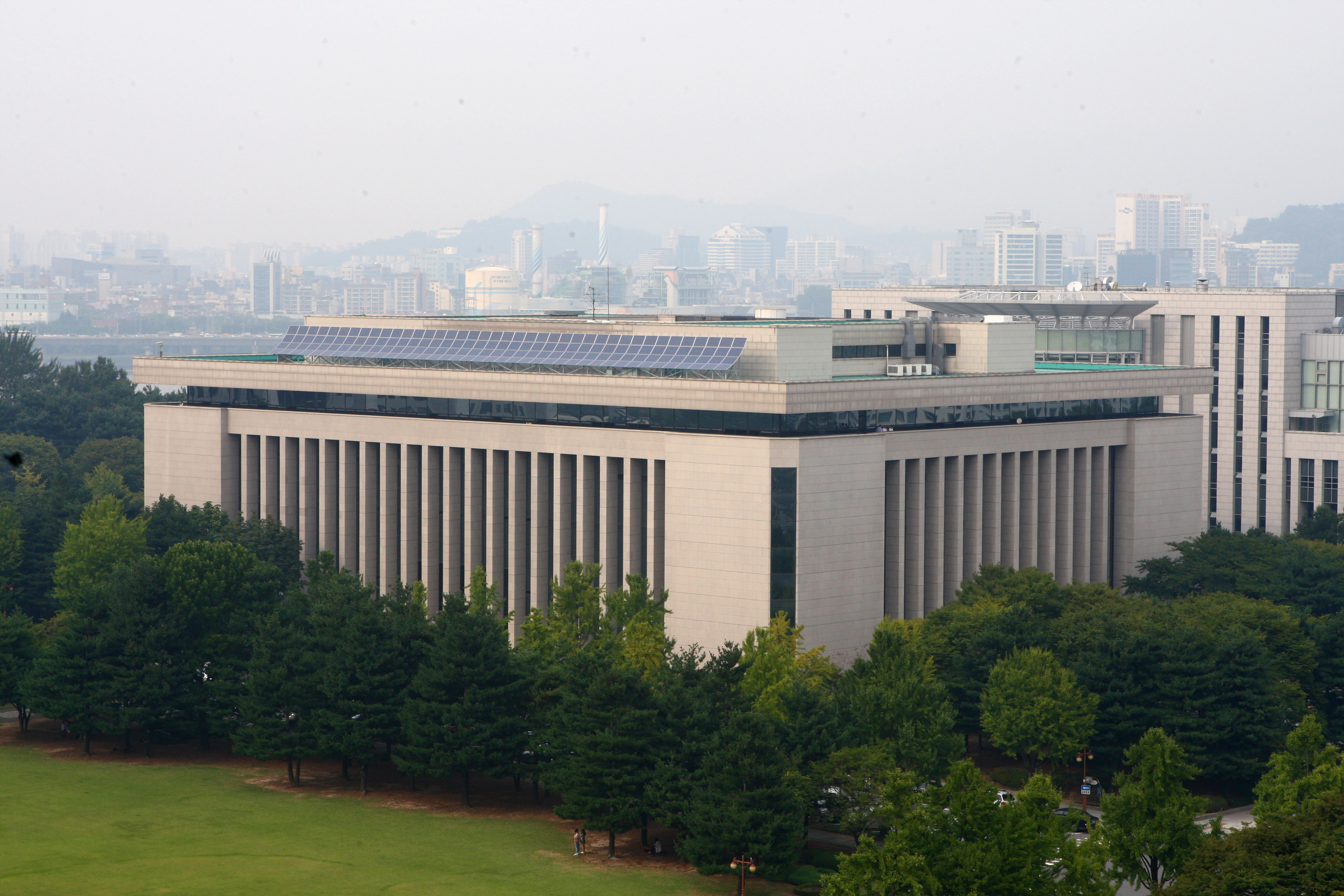
- Location: 1 Uisadnag-daero Yeongdeungpo-gu Seoul 07233 Korea, Republic of Korea
- Type: Parliamentary Library, National Library
- Established: 1952

Collection
- Items collected: 8.7 million items (2025)

Other information
- Director: Hwang Jeong Geun, Librarian
- Employees: 304 (2016)
- Website: www.nanet.go.kr

National Assembly Library of Korea (Korean: 대한민국 국회도서관) is a library in Yeoui-dong, Yeongdeungpo District, Seoul, South Korea. It is the largest humanities and social sciences library in the country, and functions as both a parliamentary and public library. It manages and preserves the records of the National Assembly. The Chief Librarian (vice-minister level) is a public official in political service under the Speaker of the National Assembly.

== History ==
- 1952. 2. 20. Opening of the National Assembly Library
- 1963. 11. 26. Enactment of the National Assembly Library Act
- 1975. 9. 9. Relocation of the Library to the National Assembly building in Yeouido, Seoul
- 1988. 2. 20. Opening of the National Assembly Library building
- 1997. 12. 31. Establishment of the basic plan for the National Digital Library
- 1998. 10. 12. Opening of the Library to the general public (over 20 years of age)
- 2000. 3. 11. Signing of the first Agreement of Mutual Cooperation with Yonsei University
- 2005. 2. 18. Opening the Library to users over 18 years of age
- 2006. 8. 16. - 8. 19. Hosting of the 22nd IFLA Annual Conference of the Library and Research Services for Parliaments Section
- 2009. 4. 27. National Assembly Archives transferred to the Library
- 2009. 11. 20. Opening of the Dokdo Island Branch
- 2010. 1. 28. Signing of the 1000th Agreement on Mutual Cooperation with Hasang Braille Library
- 2010. 2. 3. Hosting of "Living Library" event
- 2010. 9. 6. - 9. 10. Hosting of the 2010 GLIN Seoul Conference
- 2011. 8. 26. Establishment of the Law Library
- 2012. 1. 2. Opening of the National Assembly Library mobile service
- 2014. 2. 15. Hosting of a Conference with Guest Speaker Ronni Abergel, Founder of the Human Library
- 2014. 5. 14. Opening of the Legal Information Center
- 2015. 4. 22. - 4. 24. Hosting of the 4th International Conference on Asian Special Libraries
- 2015. 6. 4. Opening of the "Parliamentary Information System of the National Assembly and Local Councils"
- 2016. 8. 31. Easing of restrictions on use by young people between 12 and 17 years of age

== Users ==
- Former and current members as well as staff of the National Assembly
- College students and members of the general public over 18 years of age
- Young people between 12 and 17 years of age with a need to use the collections and services of the National Assembly Library
- Foreign nationals: holders of passports or certificates of alien registration
