= Jim Perrin =

English rock climber and author

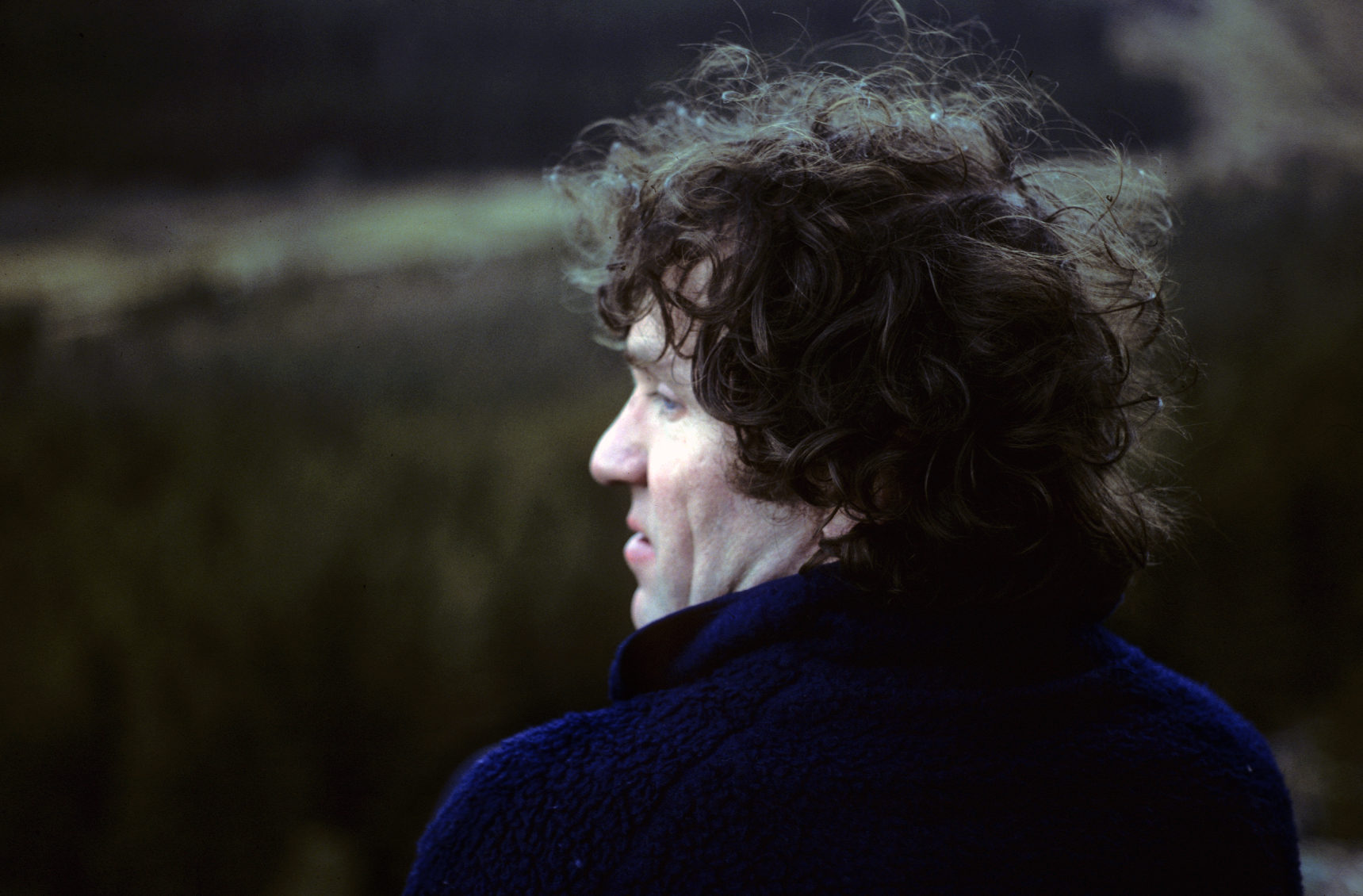
Jim Perrin in North Wales in 1984, photo: Pat Ament

Jim Perrin (born 30 March 1947), is an English rock climber and travel writer.

== Biography ==
Jim Perrin was born Ernest James Perrin in Manchester, England, to a family of Huguenot descent. His father played rugby league for Salford in the late 1930s.

As a writer, Perrin has made regular contributions on travel, mountaineering, literature, art, and the environment to a number of newspapers and climbing magazines, and continues to do so as a country diarist for The Guardian and a columnist in The Great Outdoors magazine. As a climber, he has developed many new routes, particularly on the Derbyshire gritstone outcrops, in North Wales and on the sea cliffs of Pembrokeshire, as well as making solo ascents of a number of difficult established routes, and also free ascents of previously aid-assisted climbs in Wales and Scotland.

For many years he has contributed mountaineering obituaries for The Guardian (for example, on Patrick Monkhouse, Lord Hunt, Sir Jack Longland, Sir Edmund Hillary, Brede Arkless, John Streetly, David Cox, Kevin FitzGerald, Robin Hodgkin, and others), and also for The Daily Telegraph. He also wrote many essays for The Daily Telegraph travel supplement, most of which are collected in Travels with the Flea.

== Awards ==
Perrin has twice won the Boardman Tasker Prize for Mountain Literature, first for Menlove (1985), his biography of John Menlove Edwards, and again as joint winner (alongside Andy Cave's Learning to Breathe) for The Villain (2005), a biography of Don Whillans. Several of his other books have been shortlisted for this award. He has won the Mountaineering History Prize at Banff Mountain Book Festival for The Villain (2005), and the Mountaineering Literature Prize for The Climbing Essays (2006), which was also short-listed for the Wales Book of the Year Award. His Shipton and Tilman: The Great Decade of Himalayan Mountaineering won the Kekoo Naoroji Prize for Himalayan Literature in 2014. He is a Fellow of the Welsh Academy, an Honorary Fellow of Bangor University.

== Bibliography ==
Below is a partial list of books by Perrin listed by Amazon as in print (on 7 November 2016):

- Mirrors in the Cliffs (ed.) (1983), Diadem
- H.W. Tilman: The Seven Mountain-Travel Books (1985), Diadem, edited and introduced
- Eric Shipton: The Six Mountain-Travel Books (1985), Diadem, edited and introduced
- Spirits of Place (1997), Gomer Press
- Visions of Snowdonia (1997), BBC Publications
- River Map (2001, 2nd edition 2002), Gomer Press
- Travels with the Flea... and Other Eccentric Journeys (2001, second edition 2002), Neil Wilson Publishing
- The Villain: The Life of Don Whillans (2005), Hutchinson
- The Climbing Essays (2006), Neil Wilson Publishing
- West: A Journey through the Landscapes of Loss (2010), Atlantic Books
- Snowdon: The Story of a Welsh Mountain (2012), Gomer Press
- Shipton and Tilman: The Great Decade of Himalayan Exploration (2013), Hutchinson
- A Snow Goose, and other utopian fictions (2013), Cinnamon Press
- A William Condry Reader (ed.) (2015), Gomer Press
- The Hills of Wales (2016), Gomer Press

The following are out of print:

- Menlove: Life of John Menlove Edwards (1985), Gollancz (second edition, 1993, Ernest Press)
- On and Off the Rocks (1986), Gollancz
- Yes, To Dance (1990), Oxford Illustrated Press
