= Totem Pole (Tasmania) =

Sea stack in Tasmania

The Totem Pole
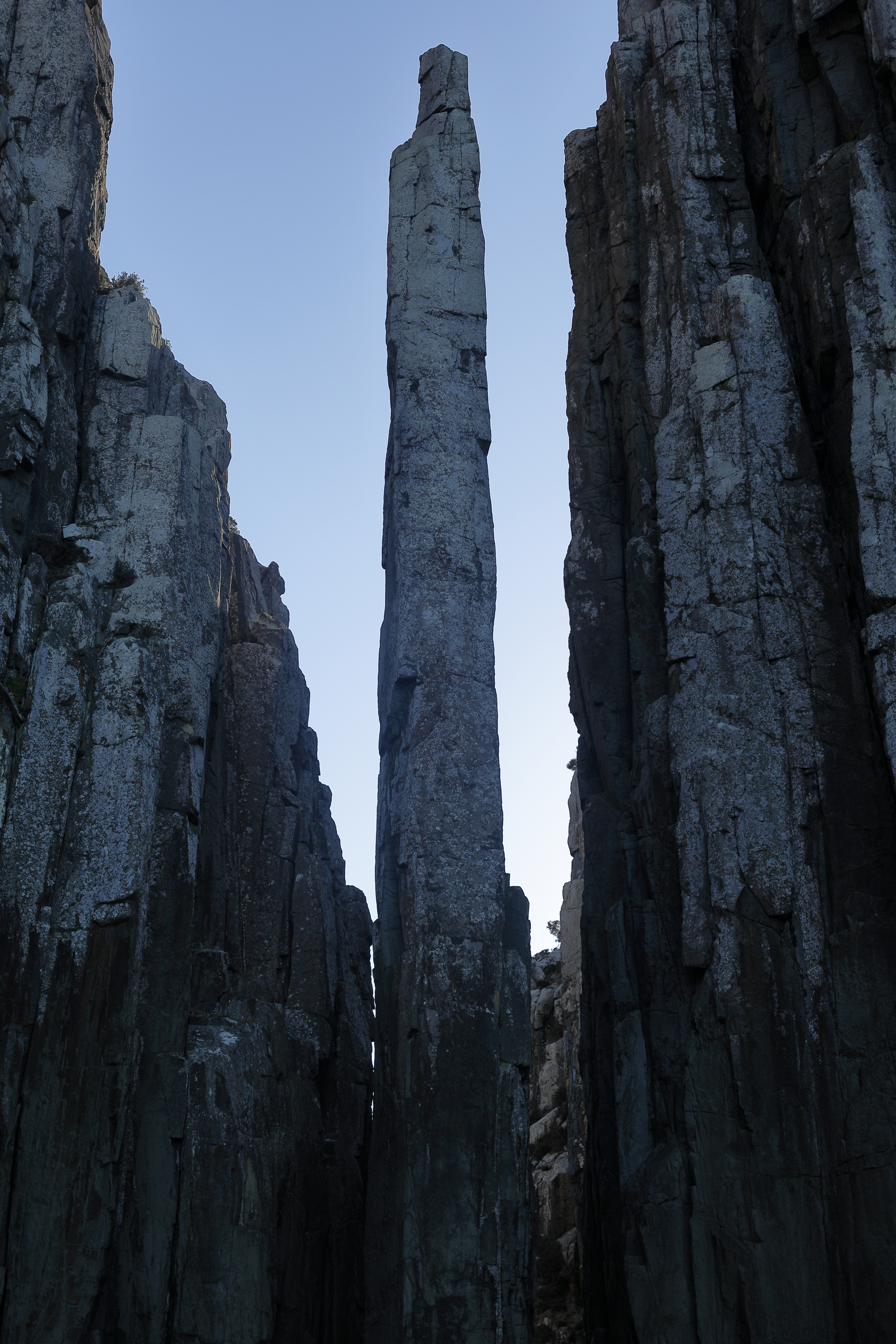
- The Totem Pole and The Candlestick

- Location within Tasmania
- Location: Cape Hauy
- Coordinates: 43.13938°S 148.00579°E
- Route type: Trad climb
- Vertical gain: 65 metres (213 ft)
- Pitches: 2
- Technical grade: 24 (The Free Route)
- First ascent: John Ewbank and Allan Keller, 1968
- First free ascent: Doug McConnel and Dean Rollins

The Totem Pole is a sea stack popular amongst rockclimbers in the Tasman National Park, Tasmania, Australia. It contains a number of climbing routes, all of which require a Tyrolean traverse to return to the mainland, and is famous for being the site of the 1998 accident which caused British climber Paul Pritchard's hemiplegia.

== First ascent ==
The Totem Pole was first climbed in 1968 by John Ewbank and Allan Keller and freed by Doug McConnell and Dean Rollins.

Lynn Hill attempted the first onsight, but fell after breaking a hold, leaving Monique Forestier to onsight it a few years later.

== Paul Pritchard's accident ==
Paul planned on climbing the Totem Pole in 1998 with his partner Celia when, after abseiling down, his rope caught a large rock which fell 9 metres (30 ft) onto his head. Celia ran 8 kilometres (5.0 mi) back to Fortescue Bay to call for help. He survived on the ledge for eight hours before he was rescued and was left paralysed on his left side and with speech and memory difficulties. He later wrote a book about the experience and returned in 2016 to complete the climb.

== Rock type ==
Tasmania is known for its igneous dolerite pillars, which are popular amongst climbers. These pillars were formed by volcanic activity extruding magma from the ground, which when cooled at a constant rate creates rare hexagonal pillars. These form via a slightly different mechanism to usual sea-stacks, and can be found at other rock-climbing sites around the state including Mount Wellington's Organ Pipes.

== Gallery ==
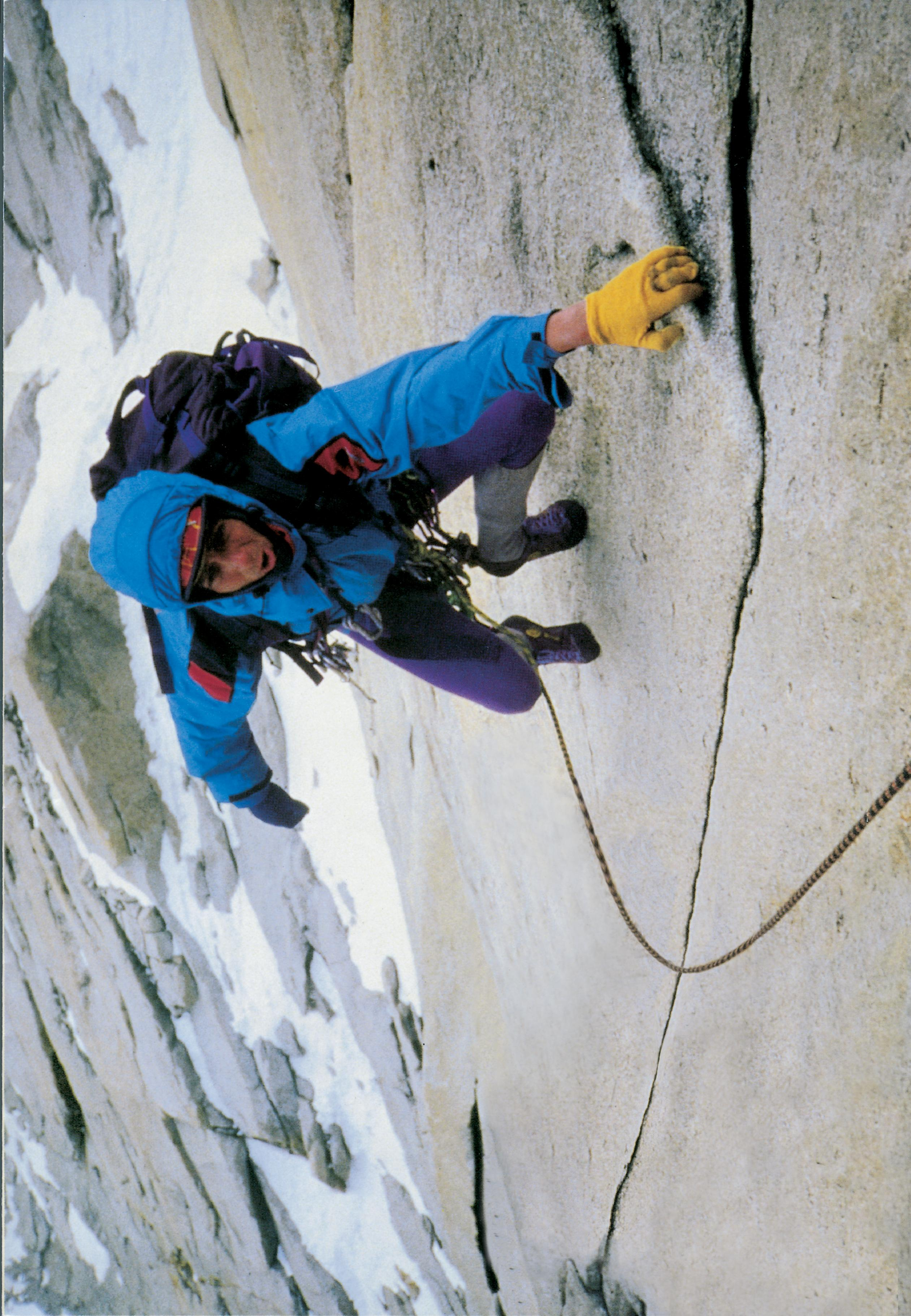
Paul Pritchard climbing

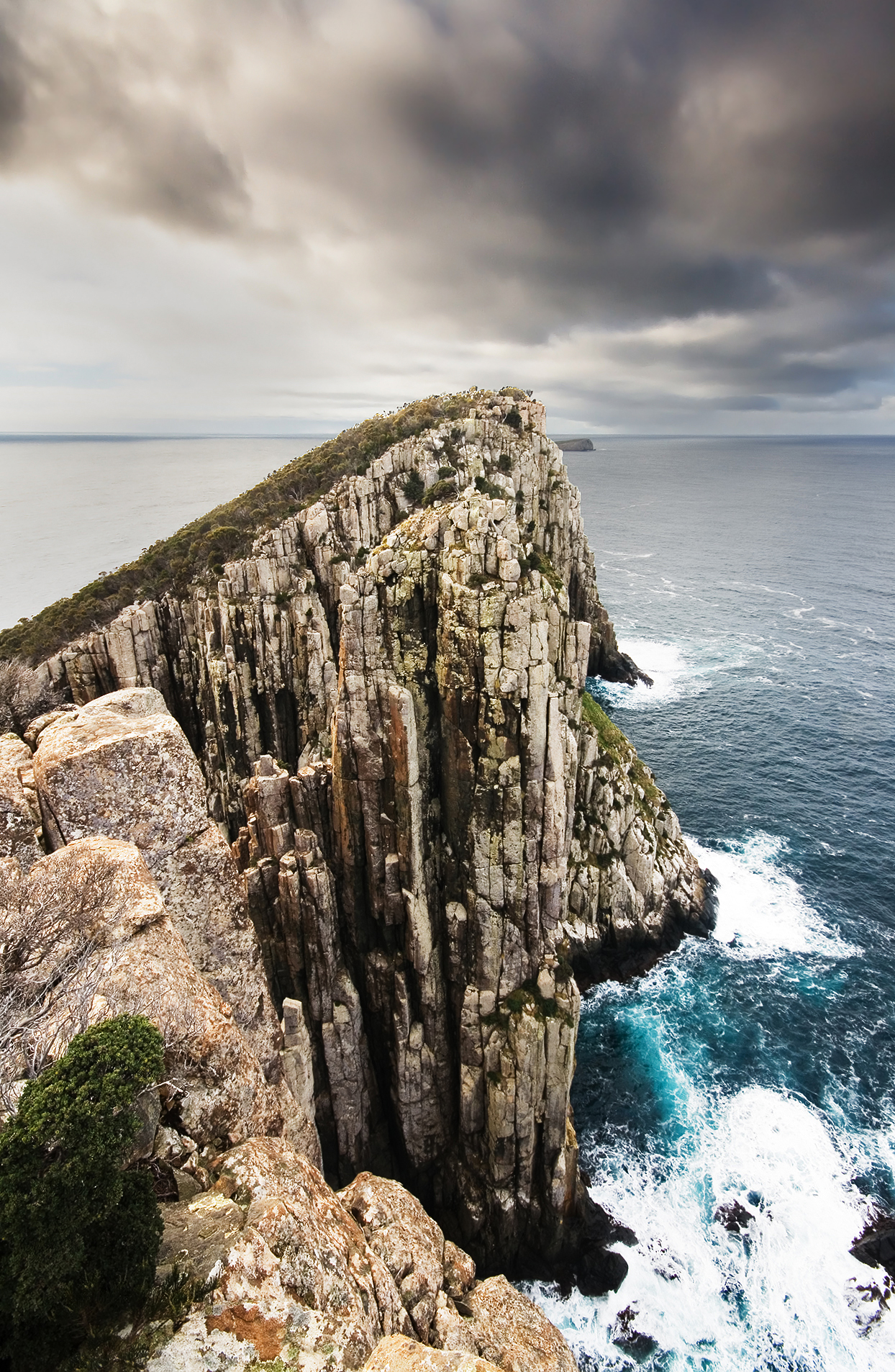
Dolerite rock columns in Cape Hauy, Tasmania

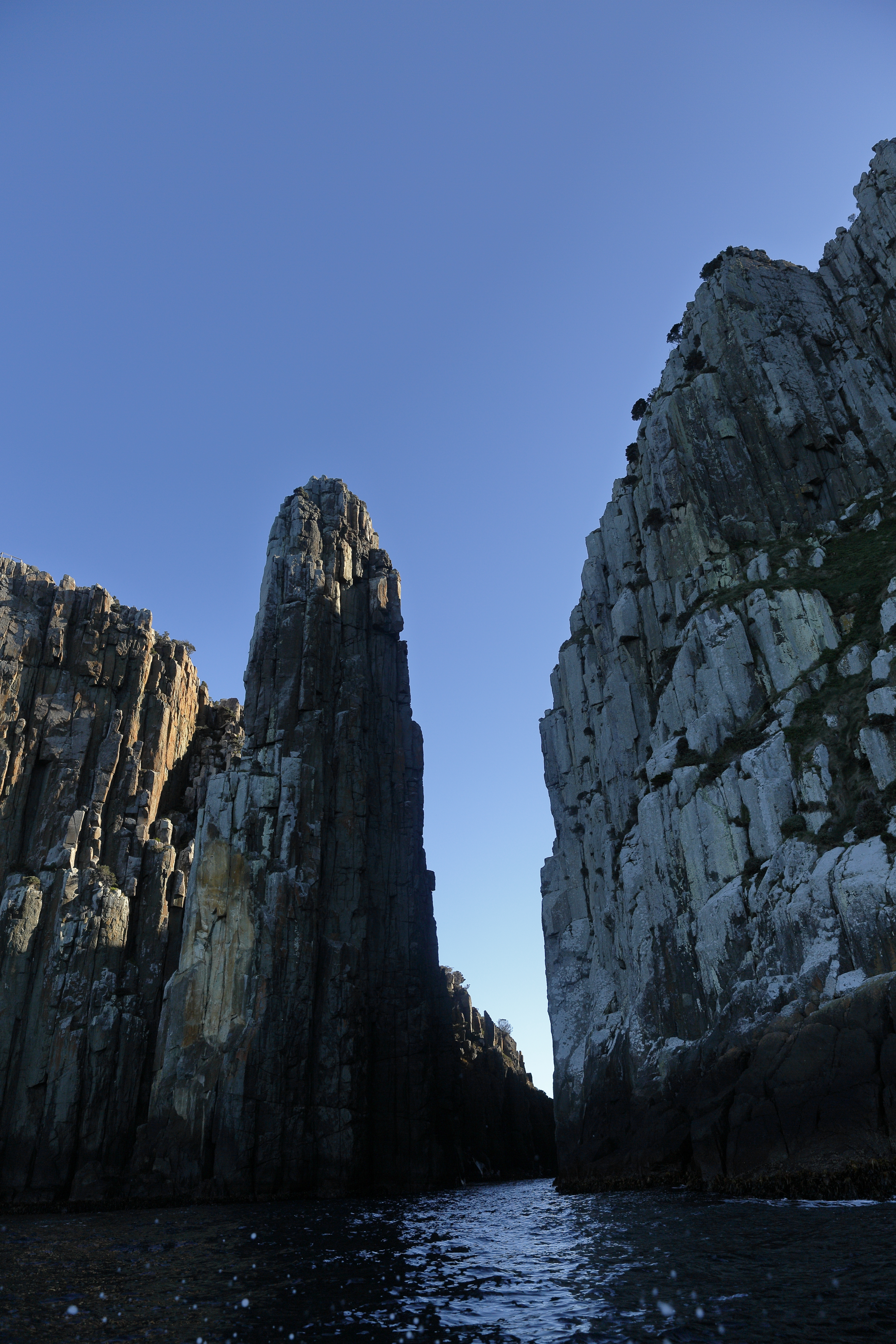
Sea stacks as seen from the water in Tasmania
