= Paul Pritchard =

British rock climber and mountaineer

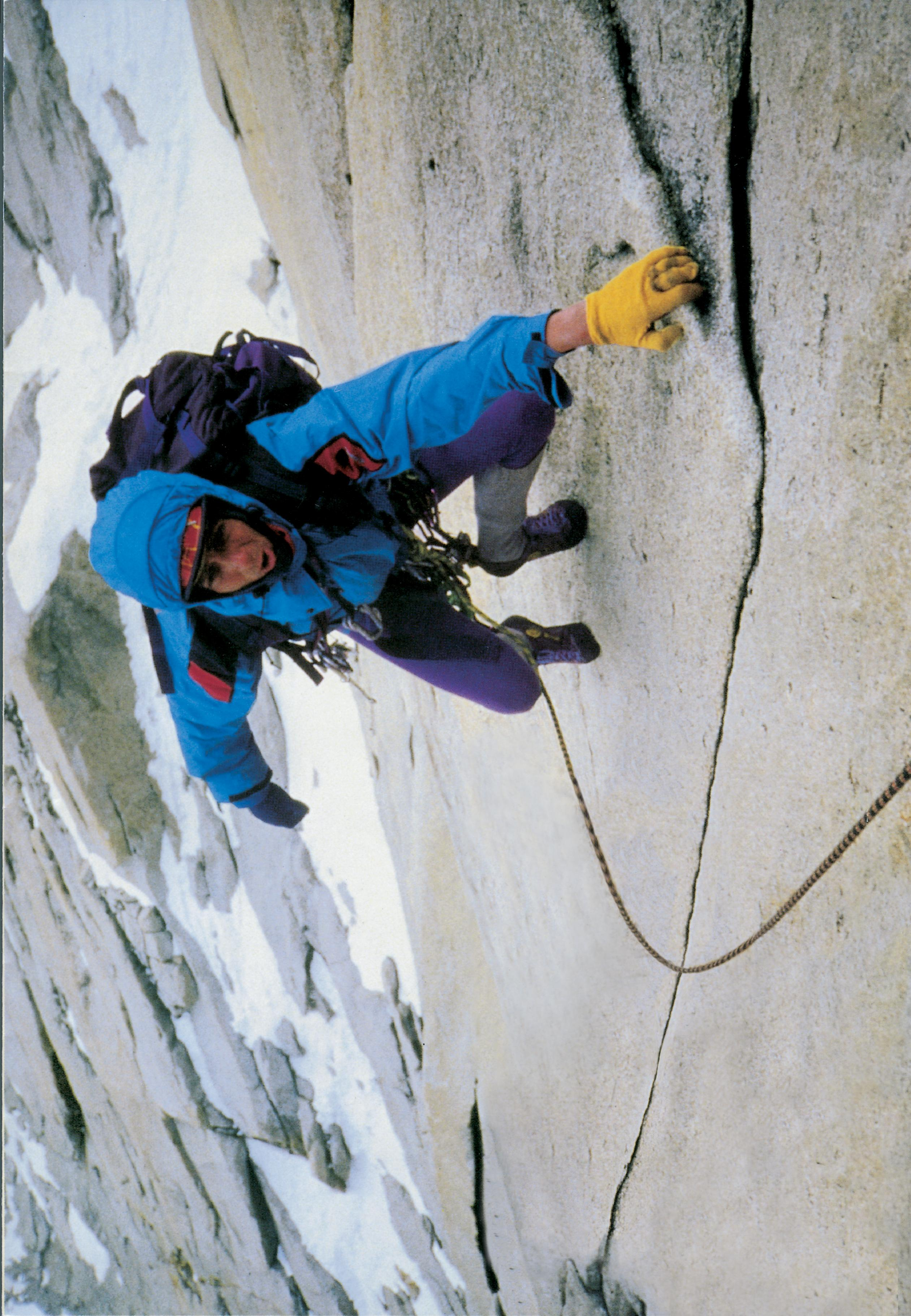
- Born: 1967 (age 58–59); Bolton, Greater Manchester, UK
- Known for: Rock climbing, mountaineering, disability educator
- Website: www.paulpritchard.com.au

Paul Pritchard (born 1967) is a rock climber and mountaineer and was one of the foremost British climbers of the 1980s and 1990s. He was born in Bolton, England and started climbing when he was 16 years old. He is notable for having climbed difficult routes across the United Kingdom and around the world. In 1998, he sustained a traumatic brain injury while attempting to climb the Totem Pole, which left him hemiplegic. Since the accident he has continued to engage in various forms of outdoor recreation, has published multiple books about his recovery, and is now a disability educator specialising in diversity and inclusion.

== Early life ==
Pritchard was born in Bolton, and started climbing at the age of 16 in his native Lancashire. Within a year he had started to repeat some of the hardest routes in the county, as well as beginning his own additions. He made many ascents of outstanding problems in the Lancashire Quarries as well as engaging in extensive exploration of Malham Cove.

In 1986 he moved to Llanberis in North Wales, climbing extensively on the slate of the Llanberis quarries and on the sea cliffs at Gogarth, situated between North Stack and South Stack, near Holyhead. He gained a reputation for climbing hard and very poorly protected routes such as Super Calabrese (E8 6b) at Gogarth, still considered one of the most serious routes in the UK.

== Shift to The Mountains ==
In 1990, he began mountaineering, and subsequently climbed many difficult big wall routes around the world. This included a major new climb up the East Face of Central Tower Of Paine in Patagonia, the first ascent of the West Face of Mount Asgard on Baffin Island, Trango Tower and multiple attempts on the then-unclimbed Shark's Fin on Meru Peak, in the Indian Himalayan Region.

== Injury and recovery ==
On Friday 13 February 1998, Pritchard's life changed drastically when he was struck in the head by a falling boulder while attempting an ascent of the Totem Pole, a slender sea stack off the coast of Tasmania. He was rendered semiconscious, bleeding, and nearly helpless. Over the next hours a heroic rescue was effected by his partner, Celia Bull. He was left suffering from hemiplegia, a condition that robbed him of feeling and movement in his right side and which caused his speech and memory to suffer.

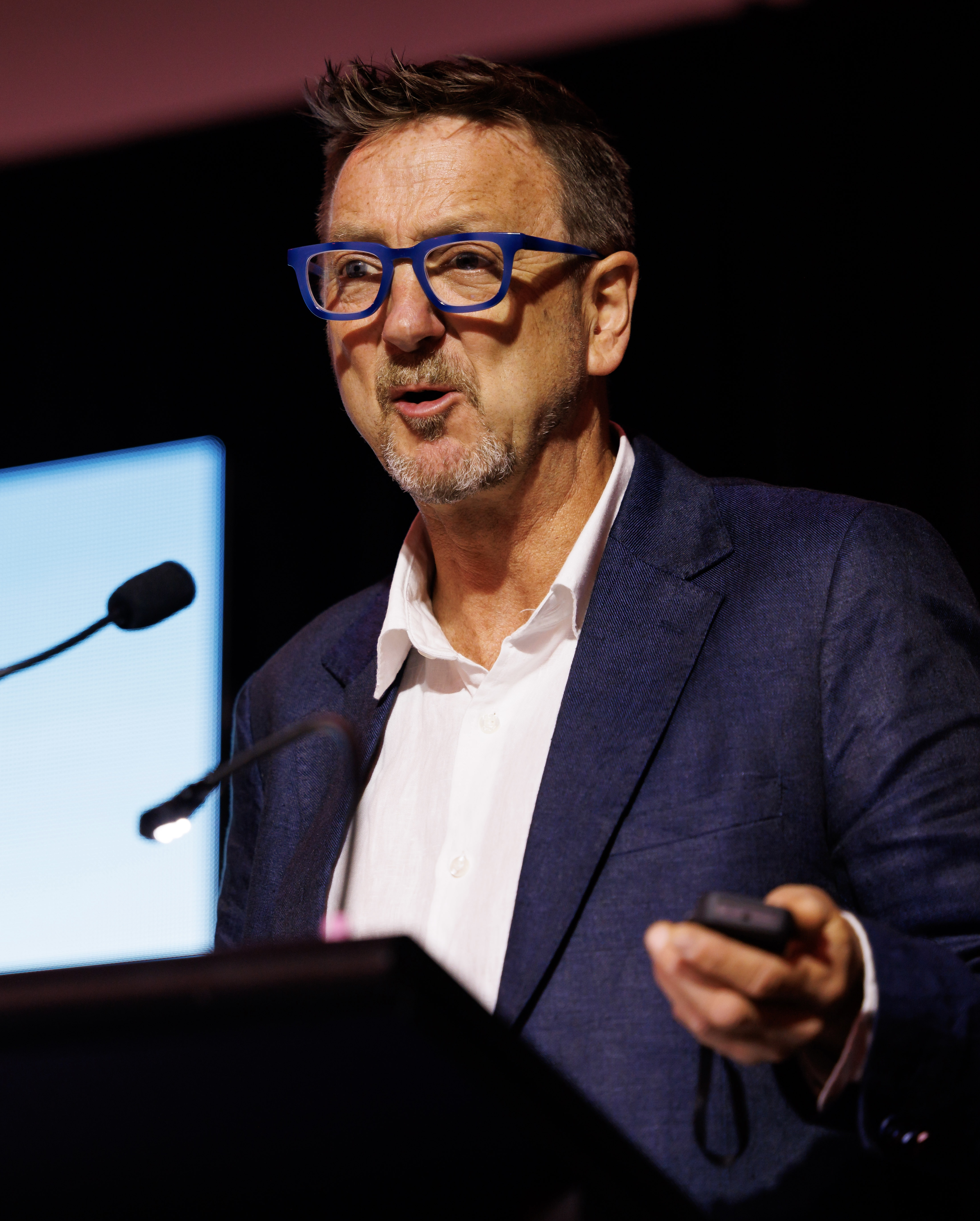
Speaking to NT Tourism in 2023, Darwin, Australia

== Disability Ambassador ==
Pritchard has continued to lead a challenging life even after the catastrophic injury. He has climbed Kilimanjaro, ridden a recumbent trike through Tibet to Mount Everest and took the lead rock climbing again. In 2016 Paul finally climbed the Totem Pole, 18 years after his accident. The film of this, Doing It Scared, won numerous awards.

In 2017 Pritchard, and 4 other people with disabilities, accomplished the first journey under human power between Australia’s extremities of altitude. On the Lowest To Highest Expedition the team members cycled from Kati Thanda-Lake Eyre (-15m) to Kosciuszko -Targangil (2228m), a distance of 2152 km. In 2022 he led a team of people with various disabilities across the challenging Larapinta Trail for 17 days, a distance of 237 km.

Pritchard is now a diversity and inclusion educator and speaks internationally on the subject as well as volunteering with the Human Library.

== Publications ==
Pritchard has written four books:

- Deep Play (1997) is about his early climbing experiences
- Totem Pole (1999) about his accident and his recovery from it
- The Longest Climb (2005) continues his story of recovery
- The Mountain Path (2021) delves into spiritual and philosophical aspects of climbing

He won the 1997 Boardman Tasker Prize for Mountain Literature for his book Deep Play. He also won the Boardman Tasker Prize for Mountain Literature for TheTotem Pole which was also awarded the 1999 Banff Mountain Book Festival Grand Prize. The Longest Climb was shortlisted for the Banff Mountain Book Festival Mountain Literature Prize. The Mountain Path was the only book shortlisted for both a Banff prize and the B/T in 2022 and won the 2022 NZ Mountain Book Festival award for non-fiction.
