= Changabang =

Mountain in the Garhwal Himalaya

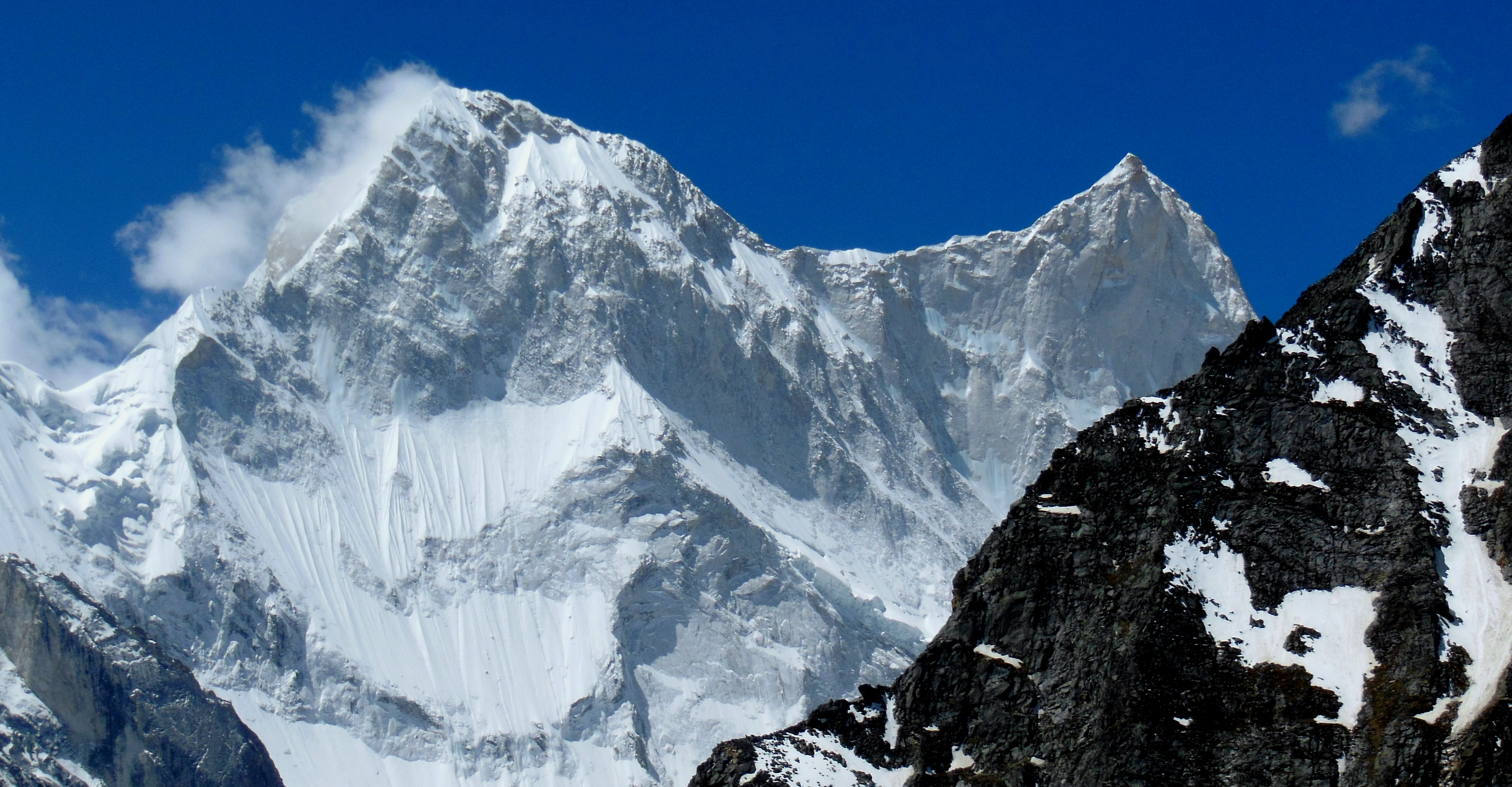
- North Face of Kalanka (left) and Changbang peaks from Bagini glacier

Highest point
- Elevation: 6,864 m (22,520 ft)
- Prominence: circa 300 m (1000 ft)
- Parent peak: Kalanka (6931 m)
- Listing: Mountain peaks of Uttarakhand
- Coordinates: 30°30′0″N 79°55′32″E

Geography
- Location within India
- Country: India
- State: Uttarakhand
- Division: Garhwal
- Parent range: Garhwal Himalayas

Climbing
- First ascent: 4 June 1974 by Tashi Chewang, Balwant Sandhu, Chris Bonington, Martin Boysen, Dougal Haston, Doug Scott
- Easiest route: Southeast Face/East Ridge (snow/ice climb)

Changabang is a mountain in the Garhwal Himalayas of Uttarakhand, India. It is part of a group of peaks that form the northeast wall of the Nanda Devi Sanctuary. It is a particularly steep and rocky peak, and all routes on it are serious undertakings. It has been the site of many significant climbs. It does not have a high topographic prominence, being slightly lower than its near neighbour Kalanka to the east, and lower than many other peaks in the immediate vicinity, but its steep rocky profile has made it a more attractive destination than its elevation would indicate. Changabang loosely translated means "shining mountain" in Hindi.

== Climbing ==
=== First ascent ===
Changabang was first climbed on 4 June 1974 by an expedition led by Lt. Col Balwant Sandhu and Chris Bonington, via the Southeast Face, leading to the East Ridge. This is the easiest route on the mountain, and one of the few that is primarily a snow/ice climb, as opposed to a rock climb with some snow, ice, or mixed terrain.

=== Notable ascents ===
Other notable ascents include some of the hardest climbs ever done in the Himalayas.

- 1976 Southwest Ridge, Naoki Toda, Akira Kobayashi, Masahide Aida, Harumi Ohno, Yukio Asano and Teruyoshi Karino (Japanese Alpine Club) all reached the summit after 33 days of effort.
- 1976 West Wall, Peter Boardman and Joe Tasker, summit reached 15 October 1976. The route took over 25 days to ascend, and their use of big wall climbing techniques to overcome the serious, sustained difficulties was revolutionary. Boardman's account of the ascent, The Shining Mountain, won the 1979 John Llewellyn Rhys Prize for literature.
- 1978 Direct South Face, Wojciech Kurtyka (Pol.), Krzysztof Żurek (Pol.), Alex MacIntyre (UK) and John Porter (US-UK), summit reached 27 September 1978.
- 1981 South Ridge, Ugo Manera (Ita.), Lino Castiglia (Ita.) first summit via the South Ridge.
- 1997 North Face, Andy Cave and Brendan Murphy (summit) with Mick Fowler and Steve Sustad (to summit ridge) made the first ascent of the North Face of Changabang, a 1,600 m (5,250 ft) route involving steep, sustained ice, mixed, and rock climbing. (Murphy was hit by an avalanche and swept off the face to his death on the descent.)
- 1998 The Lightning Route, Carlos Buhler (US) and a team of Russians (Andrei Volkov, Andrei Mariev, Ivan Dusharin and Pavel Chabaline) established a demanding new route on the north face: (VII 5.9 A4 WI4, 1580m)
- 2006 A New Route, On 12 October 2006, two Mexican climbers, Andrés Delgado and Alfonso de la Parra, summitted Changabang by a new route. While descending, they encountered a storm and were officially reported missing by the Indian Mountaineering Federation on 15 October, when they last made contact via satellite phone. An initial rescue effort was made despite harsh weather conditions, but on 8 November the search was cancelled due to continued harsh weather.
- 2022 The 2nd Ascent of West Wall, Matthew Scholes, Kim Ladiges from Australia and Daniel Joll from New Zealand made the second ascent of the West Ridge in the first week of May.
