= Balwant Sandhu =

Personal information
- Nationality: Indian
- Born: October 1, 1934
- Died: December 3, 2010 (aged 76)

Climbing career
- Major ascents: First ascent of Changabang (1974); First ascent of West Face of Kamet (7756 m, 1985)

Balwant Singh Sandhu (1934–2010) was an Indian mountaineer and a colonel in the Indian Army. He made the first ascent of Changabang along with Sir Chris Bonington in 1974. In 1981, he received the Arjuna Award for excellence in mountaineering, and in 2010, after his death in an accident, he was posthumously awarded the Tenzing Norgay National Adventure Award, the highest adventure sports honour of India. Mountaineer M S Kohli described him as a "world-class climber".

Sandhu died on 3 December 2010, after a speeding car hit him outside the Indian Mountaineering Foundation headquarters in Delhi.

== Career ==
Col Balwant Sandhu was commissioned into the 6th Battalion, The Parachute Regiment in 1967. From 1980 till 1985, Sandhu was the principal of Nehru Institute of Mountaineering in Uttarkashi. In 1983, he became the president of the Himalayan Club, and in 1997-98 the vice president of Indian Mountaineering Foundation.

Sandhu made first ascents of the following: North Peak of Bancha Dhura (c. 6000m, solo climb) in 1962; Shinkun (6065m) in Lahaul in 1968; Changabang (6864m) in 1974; Phawarar ang (6349m) in 1979; Mamostong Kangri (7516m) in the East Karakoram in 1984; Kabru Dome (6600m) via a new route in 1985; West Face of Kamet (7756m) in 1985; Chombu East Peak NE Sikkim (5745 m) in 1996; along with The Doon School expeditions: Rudugaira (5816 m) in 2001 and Jogin III (6116 m) in 2002.

== Awards ==
- 1981 - Arjuna Award
- 2010 - Lifetime achievement, Tenzing Norgay National Adventure Award (awarded posthumously)
