= Kalanka =

Mountain in Garhwal Himalaya

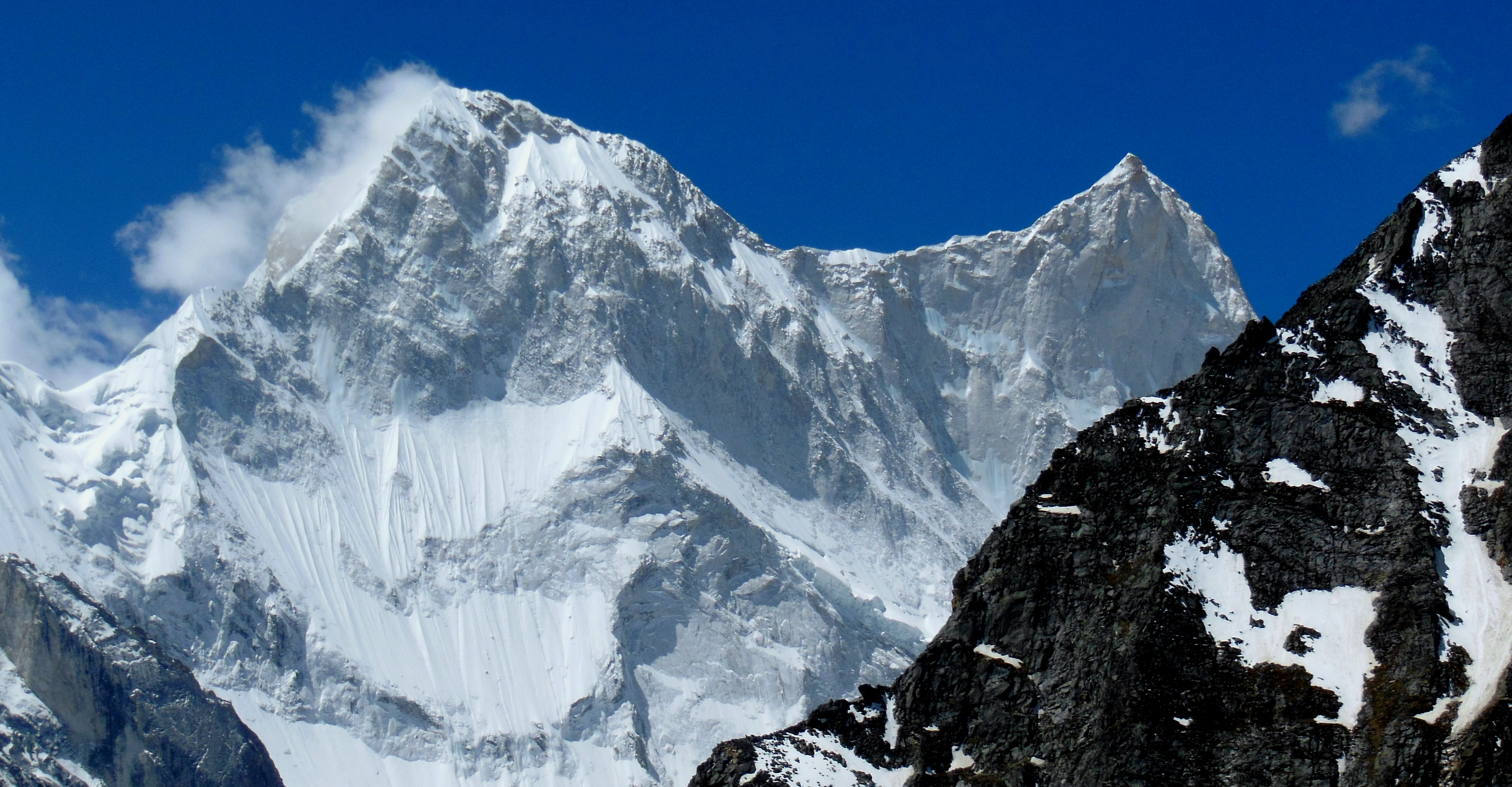
- Kalanka and Changbang from Bagini glacier (L-R)

Highest point
- Elevation: 6,931 m (22,740 ft)
- Prominence: 769 m (2,523 ft)
- Listing: Mountain peaks of Uttarakhand
- Coordinates: 30°30′12″N 79°56′30″E

Geography
- Location within Uttarakhand
- Country: India
- State: Uttarakhand
- Protected area: Nanda Devi National Park
- Parent range: Garhwal Himalayas

Climbing
- First ascent: 1975 by Ikuo Tanabe's four-member expedition from Japan via the west ridge.

Kalanka (Hindi: कलंका) is a mountain of the Garhwal Himalayas in Uttarakhand, India. Kalanka stands at 6,931 metres (22,740 ft). It's the 20th highest located entirely within the Uttrakhand. Nanda Devi is the highest mountain in this category. Kalanka is the 48th highest peak in India and 319th highest peak in the world. Southern side of Kalanka falls under Nanda Devi National Park.

Kalanka loosely translated means "cockscomb" in Hindi.

== Geography ==
Kalanka lies on the outer rim of the Nanda Devi sanctuary and in between Changabang and Saf Minal.

The mountain is surrounded by glaciers on three sides: Changabang on the southern side, Uttari Rishi on the eastern side, and Bagini on the northern side. The river from the Bagini Glacier meets with the Dhauliganga River at Jumma. Changabang Bamak (Glacier) and Uttari Rishi Bamak (Glacier) also intersect with the Dhauliganga River through the Rishi Ganga gorge. The Dhauliganga River joins with the Alaknanda river at Vishnu Prayag, the two main tributaries of Dhauliganga. These two main rivers meet at Devpryag. The name Ganga starts from there.

The entire surrounding area is protected within the 2,236.74 km^{2} (863.61 sq mi) Nanda Devi National Park or Nanda Devi Biosphere Reserve which is a World Heritage Site declared by UNESCO. The Nanda Devi National Park is home to several world-class treks.

The neighboring peaks of Kalanka include:

Peak	Elevation (m/ft)		Coordinates
Nanda Devi	7,816	25,643	30°22′33″N 79°58′15″E
Dunagiri	7,066	23,182	30°30′54″N 79°52′00″E
Rishi Pahar	6,992	22,940	30°31′48″N 79°59′24″E
Saf Minal	6,911	22,674	30°31′43″N 79°58′01″E
Changabang	6,864	22,520	30°30′00″N 79°55′37″E

== Climbing history ==
The first ascent was completed in 1975 by Ikuo Tanabe's four-member expedition from Japan. They followed the Rishi Ganga gorge and crossed over to Shipton's col to gain the col between Changabang and Kalanka and climbed the west ridge. The first summit was reached by Noriaki Ikeda, Tsuneo Kouma, Kazumasa Inoue and the leader Tanabe on 3 June 1975.

The first ascent of the north face was made in 1977 by a Czechoslovak expedition led by František Grunt. They approached the col through the Bagini Glacier and the west ridge. Josef Rakoncaj and Ladislav Jon reached the summit on 20 September 1977.

The north face direct had been attempted many times but remained unclimbed until Fumitaka Ichimura, Kazuaki Amano and Yusuke Sato, of Japan, succeeded in alpine style in 2008.

The first ascent via the southeast face was completed by a Scottish team in 1978. After establishing base camp on September 20 at the junction of the Changabang and Uttar Rishi glaciers, Robert Barton and Allen Fyffe made a new route up the southeast face. They reached the summit on October 11.

== See also ==
- Gangotri National Park
