= Philip Connors =

American essayist and author

Philip Connors is an American essayist and author. He was born in Iowa and raised in Minnesota. He studied journalism at the University of Montana. He interned at The Nation and subsequently worked at the Wall Street Journal for several years. He left New York City in 2002 and moved to New Mexico. He lived in Silver City, NM for several years before moving to El Paso, Texas.

Every year since 2002, Connors has worked for several months in the summer at the Gila National Forest as a US Forest Service fire lookout. His book based on these experiences Fire Season: Field Notes From a Wilderness Lookout was published in 2011 to widespread critical acclaim. It won the 2011 National Outdoor Book Award (Outdoor Literature) and the 2012 Banff Mountain Book Festival Grand Prize. It also won the 2012 Reading the West Book Award for best adult non-fiction, given by the Mountains and Plains Independent Booksellers Association.

Connors' work has been published in The Guardian, Harper's Magazine, Paris Review, n+1, Salon, and the London Review of Books.

== Bibliography ==
- Philip Connors (2011). Fire Season: Field Notes from a Wilderness Lookout (memoir). Ecco. ISBN 9780061859366.
- Philip Connors (2015). All The Wrong Places: A Life Lost and Found (memoir). W. W. Norton & Company. ISBN 9780393088762.
- Philip Connors (2018) . A Song For The River (memoir). Cinco Puntos Press. El Paso, Tx. ISBN 9781941026908
