= Oxford Illustrated Press =

The Oxford Illustrated Press Ltd was a book publishing company associated with Oxford, England. The company was based in Shelley Close, Headington, east Oxford.

== Selected books ==
Books published by the Oxford Illustrated Press include:

- Curl, James Stevens, The Erosion of Oxford, 1977. ISBN 0-902280-40-6.
- Dodwell, Christina, In Papua New Guinea. ISBN 0-902280-98-8.
- Graham, Malcolm, Henry Taunt of Oxford: A Victorian Photographer, 1973. ISBN 0-902280-14-7.
- Taylor, Gordon, The Sea Chaplains: A History of the Chaplains of the Royal Navy, 1978. ISBN 0-902280-56-2.
- McNeish, Cameron, Backpacker’s Manual, 1984. ISBN 0-946609-01-2.
- Perrin, Jim, Yes, To Dance, 1990.
- Redhead, Brian, The National Parks of England Wales, 1988.
- Rose, Andrea, Pre-Raphaelite Portraits. ISBN 0-902280-74-0.
