= Stephen Venables =

British mountaineer and writer

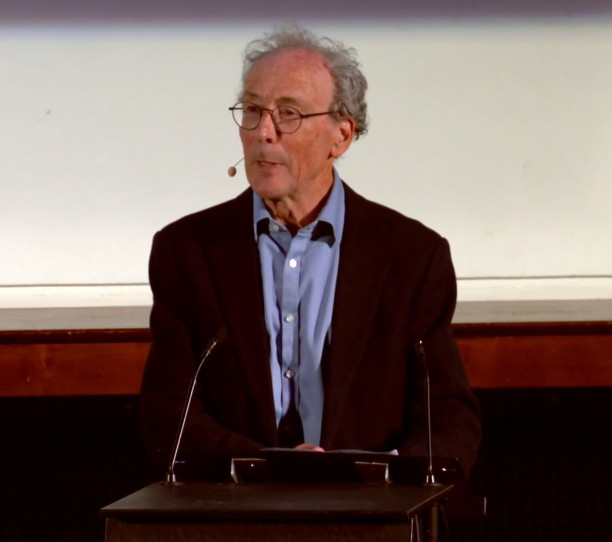
Stephen Venables speaking at the Royal Geographical Society Everest 24 lecture, May 2024

Stephen Venables (born 2 May 1954) is a British mountaineer and writer, and is a past president of the South Georgia Association and of the Alpine Club. He is the first Briton to ascend the summit of Mount Everest without bottled oxygen.

== Mountaineer ==
In 1988, Venables became the first Briton to ascend the summit of Mount Everest without bottled oxygen. His ascent, as far as the South Col, was by a new route up the Kangshung Face from Tibet, with just three other climbers, Americans Robert Anderson and Ed Webster, and Canadian Paul Teare. All four reached the South Col but Teare decided to descend from here, concerned about incipient altitude sickness. The other three continued up the final section of the normal 1953 route, but Anderson and Webster were forced to turn back at the South Summit. Meanwhile, Venables reached the summit alone, at 3.40 pm. Descending late in the day, he decided to bivouac in the open at about 8,600 metres, rather than risk a fall by continuing in the dark. Anderson and Webster spent the night slightly lower in an abandoned Japanese tent. In the morning all three were reunited and continued down to their own tents on the South Col. It took them a further three days to complete an epic retreat down the Kangshung Face. All three climbers suffered some frostbite, with Webster affected worst.

Venables's other Himalayan first ascents include new routes in the Hindu Kush (1977), Kishtwar Shivling (1983), Solu Tower (1987), the south-west ridge of Kusum Kanguru (1991) and Panch Chuli V (1992). During the descent from Panch Chuli V Venables broke both his legs in a fall, when an abseil anchor failed; thanks to his Indian and British teammates and the Indian Air Force, he was rescued. This expedition was recorded in his book A Slender Thread and in Victor Saunders's No Place to Fall. He has also made first ascents in Peru, Bolivia, Patagonia and South Georgia. He has appeared in several BBC television documentaries and the IMAX film Shackleton's Antarctic Adventure. He is currently president of the South Georgia Association and is a past President of the Alpine Club.

== Personal life ==
Venables was educated at Charterhouse School and New College, Oxford, where he studied English language and literature, and was a member of the Oxford University Mountaineering Club. His son, Ollie (born June 1991), was diagnosed with autism aged two and leukaemia aged four. After several cancer-free years, he developed a brain tumour and died, aged twelve years old.

== Awards and honors ==
- 1986 Boardman Tasker Prize for Mountain Literature, Painted Mountains: Two Expeditions to Kashmir
- 1996 Banff Mountain Book Festival (Grand Prize), Himalaya Alpine-Style: The Most Challenging Routes on the Highest Peaks
- 2007 Banff Mountain Book Festival (Best Book – Mountain Literature), Higher Than the Eagle Soars: A Path to Everest.
- 2024 Royal Geographical Society Patron's Medal.

== Books by Venables ==
- Painted Mountains: Two Expeditions to Kashmir, Mountaineers Press, 1987, (ISBN 0898861365)
- Everest, Kangshung Face, Pan, 1991, (ISBN 0330315595)
- Island at the Edge of the World: South Georgian Odyssey, Hodder and Stoughton, 1991, (ISBN 0340556005)
- Everest – Alone at the Summit, Odyssey, 1996, (ISBN 0952937506)
- (with Andy Fanshawe) Himalaya Alpine Style: The Most Challenging Routes on the Highest Peaks, Baton Wicks, 1999, (ISBN 1898573395)
- A Slender Thread: Escaping Disaster in the Himalaya, Arrow, 2001, (ISBN 0099279061)
- To the Top: The Story of Everest, Walker, 2004, (ISBN 1844287254)
- Everest – Summit of Achievement Bloomsbury 2003 (ISBN 0747562237)
- Ollie: The True Story of a Brief and Courageous Life, Hutchinson, 2006, (ISBN 009947879X)
- Voices from the Mountains, Reader's Digest, 2006, (ISBN 076210810X)
- (with Chris Bonington) Meetings with Mountains: Remarkable Face-to-face Encounters with the World's Peaks, Cassell, 2006, (ISBN 1844034496)
- Higher Than the Eagle Soars: A Path to Everest, Random House, 2007, (ISBN 0091795613)

== See also ==
- List of 20th-century summiters of Mount Everest
