= Andy Cave =

British mountaineer and author

Personal information
- Full name: Andy Cave
- Nationality: British
- Born: 1966 (age 59–60) Royston, South Yorkshire, England

Climbing career
- Major ascents: North Face of Changabang (1997)

Andy Cave (born 1966) is a British mountaineer, mountain guide, and motivational speaker. He was nominated for the Piolet d'Or for his first ascent of the North Face of Changabang in 1997, and won the Boardman Tasker Prize for Mountain Literature in 2005.

== Biography ==
Born in 1966, Andy Cave grew up in the small coal mining village of Royston, South Yorkshire. On leaving school with few qualifications at 16, he followed family tradition and began work as a coal miner. This period also saw him begin rock climbing in the Peak District, on his local crags. The UK miners' strike of 1984–85 gave Cave the opportunity to devote his time to climbing. In 1986, he left his job at Grimethorpe colliery, South Yorkshire, returning to education to gain a degree in English (1993) and a PhD in Linguistics (2001). His academic work included research into the dialect of Yorkshire pit villages. Cave is an UIAGM (IFMGA) International Mountain and Ski Guide.

=== The European Alps ===
In 1986, on one of his first visits to the Alps, Cave did several climbs in just a few weeks, including: the north face of the Col du Plan (solo climbed); the Bonatti Pillar, Aiguille du Dru; the Freney Pillar directissima, Mont Blanc; Gervussutti Pillar, Mont Blanc du Tacul; Walker Spur, Grandes Jorasses; Brenva Spur, Mont Blanc; the north face of the Eiger; and the north face of Les Droites. On a subsequent visit, he climbed the Brandler/Hasse route on the Cima Grande di Lavaredo, the Fish on the Marmolada, the Piz Badile north face (solo climbed), the Harlins/Robins direct on the Dru, Divine Providence on Mont Blanc, and a new route on the east face of the Grandes Jorrasses. Other ascents in the Mont Blanc massif have included: the Jori Bardill directissima, the Dru couloir, the Peuterey Ridge, the Hyper Coulouir (Brouillard Face), and the Cechinel-Nominee route on the Grand Pillar d'Angle.

=== Expeditions to Himalayas ===
- 1987 Laila Peak (Hushe Valley), west face (first ascent)
- 1987 Tupopdan, Hunza Valley, first ascent
- 1987 Ama Dablam, south ridge
- 1988 Tapadan Sar (near Karun Koh)
- 1988 Annapurna III
- 1989 Baintha Brakk north face
- 1994 Gasherbrum IV, south ridge
- 1995 Trango Towers
- Hispar La Towers
- Shishapangma
- Konga Shan massif
- 1997 Changabang

=== Expeditions to Alaska ===
- 2000 Mount Kennedy north spur, first Alpine-style ascent.

=== Expeditions to Patagonia ===
- Fitz Roy
- Mascara, Torres del Paine
- Rio Turbio
- Guillamet

In 2013, Cave was part of an expedition to the Cordillera Darwin Range of mountains in Tierra del Fuego (Chile), accompanied by Simon Yates (mountaineer) and funded by the Nick Estcourt Award.

=== Other Ascents ===
- first free ascent of the Shield on Kjerag, Lysefjord in Norway, with Leo Houlding.
- the Diamond Coulouir and the Scott-Braithwaite route (free), on Mount Kenya.

== Writing ==
Andy Cave has written two autobiographies and numerous articles for climbing magazines, books and national newspapers, including for The Guardian, The Times, and Newsweek. His debut memoir, Learning to Breathe, was published in 2005. It describes Cave's transition from working as a teenage coal miner to high level alpinism, culminating in the tragic first ascent of the north face of Changabang, in the Garhwal Himalaya, with Brendan Murphy, Mick Fowler and Steve Sustad. It won the Boardman Tasker Prize for Mountain Literature in 2005 (joint winner); the Best Adventure Travel Book at the Banff Mountain Book Festival (2005); the Premio Mazzotti prize (2006); and, the Veneto Banca – Voce dei Lettori in Italy (2006). Cave wrote a further account of the ascent of Changabang for the Alpine Journal, as a tribute to Murphy, who died in an avalanche after reaching the summit. His second memoir, Thin White Line, was published in 2008. It is a sequel to events in 1997, and describes alpine ascents in Patagonia, Norway and Alaska. His books have been translated into Italian and German. Reviews in major newspapers led to appearances on TV and radio, as well as invitations to lecture at the Edinburgh International Book Festival. Cave has also made contributions to The Red Bulletin (2009), The Traveler's Handbook (2009), and Water: The Essence of Life by Mark Niemeyer (2008), and was invited to write an introduction to James Salter's novel Solo Faces.

== TV, radio, and film ==
Cave has presented Andy Cave’s Expedition Underground, a series on BBC Radio 4 exploring the history and significance of the Thirlmere Aqueduct. He has appeared on other BBC Radio 4 programmes including Dominic Arkwright's Leaving the Comfort Zone and Excess Baggage with Sandi Toksvig. In 2012, he appeared on the BBC Radio 4 program A Good Read.

TV appearances include Coast (BBC Two), climbing the Old Man of Hoy; Griff Rhys Jones' Mountain on (BBC One), helping Rhys Jones motivate teenagers from a tough inner-city school by taking them climbing; Wild Climbs (BBC Two), an expedition to the sandstone towers of Teplice, Czech Republic; Eiger: Wall of Death (BBC Four); and The Ogre (ITV) about his expedition to the north face of Baintha Brakk (The Ogre) in the Himalayas at the age of 23. He was the subject of a film about Scottish winter climbing, Distilled, released in 2013 by Hot Aches Productions. The film has won a number of awards, including Best Film and People's Choice, both at the Kendal Mountain Festival.

== Academic qualifications ==
- BA (Hons) English Language (1993), Sheffield Hallam University
- PhD English Cultural Tradition with Sociolinguistics (2002), University of Sheffield
- D.Litt.h.c., University of Sheffield (2015)

== Charitable activity ==
Andy Cave is a trustee of the charity Adventure Learning Schools.

Along with Chris Bonington, Cave is a patron for the Jonathan Conville Memorial Trust.
