= John Ewbank (climber) =

Australian rock climber

John Ewbank (1948 - 2 Dec 2013) was an English-born Australian rockclimber. He was born in Yorkshire, England in 1948, but emigrated to Australia at the age of 15. He is best known for his development of the Ewbank System, which was used in Australia, New Zealand, and South Africa for grading climbs.

== Climbing ==
Having learned to climb in his native country, he quickly became involved in the fledgling Australian rockclimbing scene and went on to pioneer hundreds of new routes on crags around the country, particularly in the Blue Mountains in his home state of New South Wales. Many of Ewbank's first ascents are still regarded as classics of Australian climbing such as the Totem Pole in Tasmania and Janicepts (21) at Mount Piddington, which stood as the hardest climb in Australia for many years.

== Legacy ==
His most lasting legacy was the development of the Ewbank System, ubiquitous throughout Australia, New Zealand and South Africa for grading climbs. It was an entirely new system, aimed at overcoming the problems at that time with English grades being limited to Extremely Severe, and American (YDS) grades being limited to 5.9. At the time these grades were thought to be the hardest humanly possible, and as people progressed they became unwilling to grade new climbs as harder and old grades became sandbagged. Ewbank proposed an open-ended numeric-only grading system starting at 1 and (as of February 2021) extending as high as grade 35 (in Australia) / grade 39 (worldwide).

In addition to climbing, Ewbank also established Australia's first rock climbing magazine, Thrutch.

== Later life ==
Ewbank retired from active climbing in the early 1970s, disheartened by bolting wars and ethical changes, though he never truly gave it up. He was still involved in putting up major new routes in the Blue Mountains in the 1990s and continued climbing recreationally.

He pursued a career in music, releasing 2 albums while living in New York. His 1993 song "Bleeding to Death in America" was recorded by Tuli Kupferberg for his public access TV show Revolting News.

He died in New York City after a long illness on 2 December 2013. He said of his career;
