= Himalaya: A Human History =

2020 anthropological book by Ed Douglas

- Author: Ed Douglas
- Language: English
- Subject: Anthropology
- Genre: Nonfiction
- Published: 2020
- Publisher: Random House
- Publication place: United Kingdom
- Media type: Hardcover
- Pages: 592
- ISBN: 978-14-73546-14-1

Himalaya: A Human History is a nonfiction book by Ed Douglas, a mountaineer, journalist, and author who has spent over twenty-five years reporting from the Himalayan region, published in 2020 by Random House.

== Overview ==
The book is divided into 20 chapters that cover the emergence of the mountains from the Tethys Sea, the role of the Himalayas in the Puranas, the exploits of British explorers, the Sino-Indian War, and the recent tensions surrounding Sherpa labor and mountaineering on Mount Everest. According to Library Journal, the book "includes details of how Buddhism gained prominence in the region, the influence of trade routes, and how the tectonic forces that created the world's tallest mountain shaped events as much as the two regional superpowers, China and India, with an invasive and oversized role played by the East India Company and Britain."

== Reception ==
In The New Yorker, Akash Kapur writes, "Douglas, an accomplished mountaineer and the author of eight previous books on the subject, is refreshingly aware of his own romanticizations." Writing for The New York Times, Jeffrey Gettleman calls "this book in itself is a bit of a mountain to climb, nearly 600 densely packed pages — its own Everest." In The Times Literary Supplement, John Keay writes, "Douglas is said to have been working on his book for twenty-five years. The research is impressive. His bibliography runs to twenty pages and lists around a thousand titles."

According to Sribala Subramanian, a former Time magazine reporter, the book bridges the gap by narrating little-known histories of places in and around the Himalayas. In The Telegraph, Mick Brown writes, "Douglas is particularly good on the arrival and development of Buddhism in Tibet, not least the internecine political and spiritual intrigues, and the tortuous complexities of identifiable reincarnation – a singular mixture of magic and realpolitik – that sustained Tibet as a theocracy, with the Dalai Lama at its pinnacle, for 12 centuries until the Chinese invasion in 1950."

In a review for Library Journal, Zebulin Evelhoch writes, "Most of the history is drawn from European sources and viewpoints, first from missionaries and traders, followed by East India Company and British officials, and expanding to include some local sources closer to present day. Nonetheless, a comprehensive outsiders' view of tribal and royal intrigue is explored in detail, often to dizzying effect given the vast locations, time, and number of individuals involved."

Victor Mallet from the Financial Times states, "Douglas has achieved something more valuable than describe current events [in and around Himalayan region]: he has examined the ancient origins of those events with a scholarly yet entertaining synthesis of hundreds of years of history."

Kirkus Reviews describes the book as "A towering addition to any geography or mountaineering buff's library." According to Publishers Weekly, "Written in elegant prose with sharply etched profiles of historical figures, this engrossing account offers a fresh, revealing portrait of a much-mythologized place."
