= Victor Saunders =

British mountaineer and author

Victor Saunders (born c. 1950) is a British Mountaineer, and author. He has summitted Mount Everest six times, and has climbed all the Seven Summits. His first book, Elusive Summits, won the Boardman Tasker Prize for Mountain Literature in 1991.

== Climbing ==
Saunders began climbing as a child in Scotland. He would later attend Gordonstoun school, and later trained as an architect at the Architectural Association School of Architecture in London.

Saunders first gained recognition for his climbing in 1978 with his first ascent of Shield Direct, Ben Nevis. It was the first route on Ben Nevis to be graded VI. Later that year, he climbed the north face of the Eiger in winter.

In the 1980s, he began to make expeditions to the Himalayas and the Karakoram with fellow British climber Mick Fowler. The pair would continue to climb together for the next four decades.

Across the Himalayan and Karakoram ranges, Saunders would go on to make notable first ascents on the North Pillar of Spantik, the east face of Uzum Brak and the first winter ascent on Langtang.

At age 44, he left architecture to become a professional mountain guide. In 1996, he was certified as a UIAGM/IFMGA ski and mountain guide and joined the SNGM (National Syndicate of French Mountain Guides) in 2003. Saunders first reached the summit of Mount Everest in May 2004, and went on to climb it five more times.

In 2015, writer Eric Vola published Les Tribulations de Mick et Vic, a collection of climbing stories from Saunders and Fowler. It encouraged the climbers to reunite to climb in the Himalayas once more.

In 2016, he and Mick Fowler made the first ascent of Sersank Peak (6,100m) in the Indian Himalaya. It was their first time climbing together since 1987. Saunders was 66 years old at the time.

In 2020 Saunders became president of the Alpine Club.

In 2024, he and Fowler made the first ascent of the NW face of Yawash Sar, a 6,258m peak in Pakistan. Climbed in alpine style, the ascent in Pakistan's Karakoram was made forty years after the pair's first climb in the region. At the time of the climb, Fowler was 68 years old and Saunders was 74.

== Personal life ==
Saunders is the son of George Von Saloschin, a Jewish immigrant from Munich who fled Germany with his family in 1936. They immigrated to the United Kingdom where Saunders' father was given a place at Gordonstoun school. His father changed the family name to Saunders when he joined the Royal Marines.

Saunders lives in Les Houches, near Chamonix, France.

== Notable climbs ==
The climbs are listed in date order.

- 2024 - First ascent of Yawash Sar (6,258m, Karakoram) with Mick Fowler
- 2017 - Mount Tyree
- 2016 - Sersank Peak
- 2016 - Carstensz Pyramid-Puncak Java
- 2014 - Denali
- 2013 - Aconcagua
- 2013 - Chamsen
- 2012 - Mount Elbrus
- 2012 - Dykh-Tau
- 2010 - Everest
- 2007 - Ama Dablam
- 2007 - Everest
- 2006 - Everest
- 2005 - Everest
- 2004 - Ama Dablam
- 2004 - Everest
- 1997 - Cho Oyu
- 1996 - Mustagh Ata
- 1995 - Bhutan
- 1995 - Ecuador Volcanoes, Chimborazo and Cotopaxi
- 1994 - Panch Chuli Trek
- 1994 - Hatezan Zom
- 1993 - Bhutan Basingtang
- 1993 - Gondoro La
- 1993 - K2 - Saunders returned from 8000m during rescue operations.
- 1992 - Panch Chuli V - first ascent, with Dick Renshaw, Stephen Sustad & Stephen Venables
- 1992 - Rajramba - New route up SE Ridge with Dick Renshaw, Stephen Sustad & Stephen Venables
- 1991 - Elbrus
- 1991 - Karakoram
- 1991 - Ultar
- 1989 - Kangchuntse, a subsidiary summit of Makalu - First ascent of West Face with Stephen Sustad
- 1988 - Jitchu Drake - First ascent
- 1987 - Golden Pillar of Spantik, Pakistan - First ascent with Mick Fowler
- 1986 - Ushba - West Face Direct
- 1986 - The Icicle Factory and White Wedding Cuillin, Isle of Skye - First ascents, with Mick Fowler
- 1985 - Rimo I - attempt with Stephen Venables
- 1984 - Bojohagur Duanisir - attempt with Phil Butler
- 1978 - Eiger - North Face in winter, with Stevie Haston
- 1978 - Shield Direct, Ben Nevis - the first route on Ben Nevis to be graded VI

== Publications ==
- Elusive Summits: Four Expeditions in the Karakoram, 1990
- Trekking and Climbing in the Andes (Trekking and Climbing Guides), 2002, by Kate Harper, Val Pitkethly and Victor Saunders
- Alpes Occidentales: Trekking y Alpinismo, 2002, by Victor Saunders and Hilary Sharp
- Himalaya: The Tribulations of Mick & Vic co-written with Mick Fowler, which won the Grand Prize at the Passy International Mountain Book Festival, 2015
- No Place to Fall: Superalpinism in the High Himalaya, 2017
- Structured Chaos: The Unusual Life of a Climber, Vertebrate Publishing, 2021

== See also ==
- List of Mount Everest summiters by number of times to the summit
- Saunders occasionally leads commercial trekking and climbing expeditions, such as to K2 in 2023.
