= Josef Rakoncaj =

Czech mountineer and author

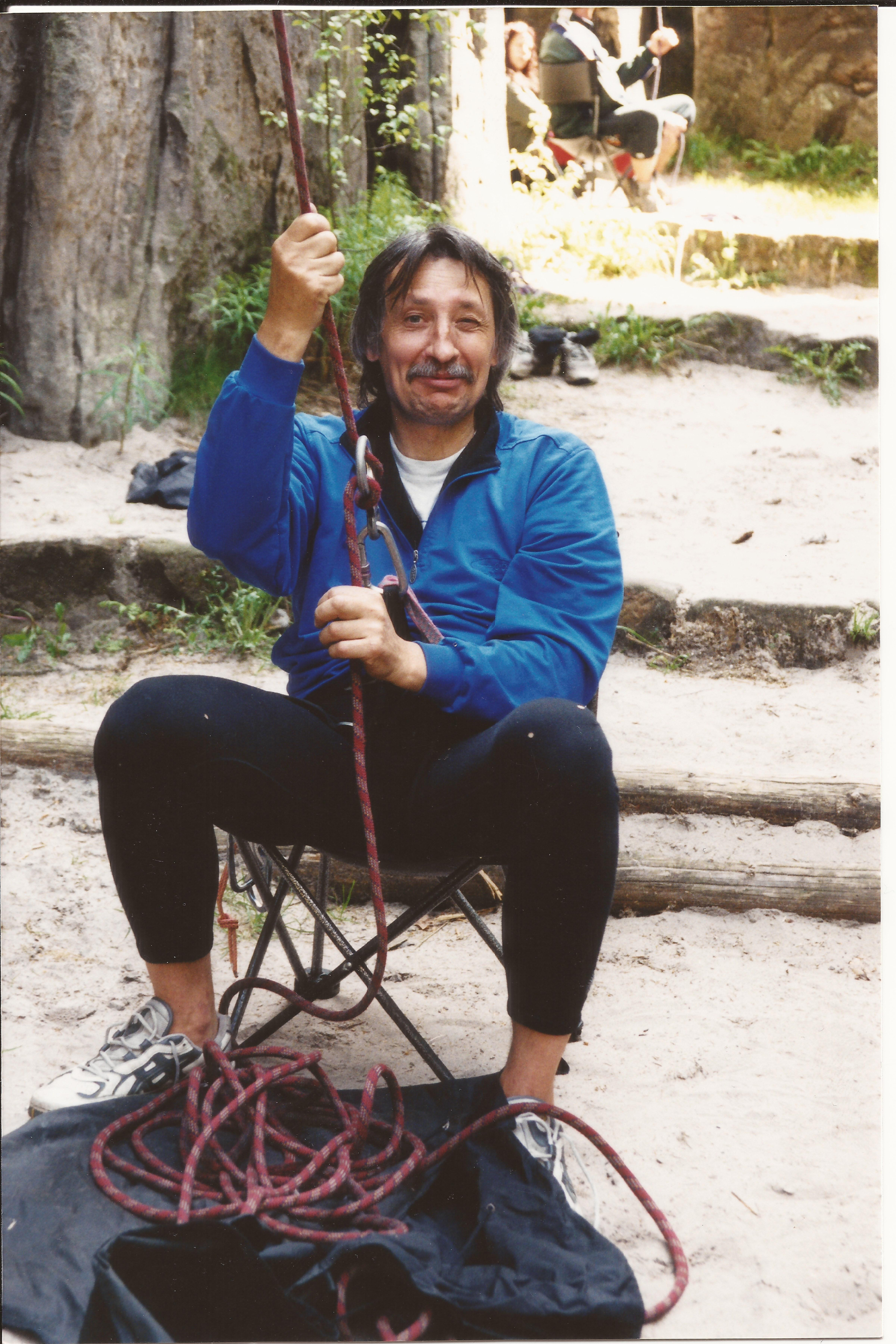

Personal information
- Nationality: Czech
- Born: 6 April 1951 (age 75) Dvůr Králové nad Labem, Czechoslovakia
- Children: Son Lukáš, daughter Lucie

Climbing career
- Major ascents: First in the world to climb K2 twice

Josef "Rak" Rakoncaj (born 6 April 1951) is a Czech mountaineer, mountaineering coach, author of books on mountaineering and also an entrepreneur in the field of special clothing and equipment for trekking and mountaineering expeditions.

He was born in Dvůr Králové nad Labem. He started with climbing on the local sandstone in Bohemian Paradise, where he has registered 54 First ascents. Internationally he is known for being the first person in the world to climb the summit of K2 (the second highest mountain in the world) twice – in 1983 and 1986. For the first of these two successful ascents, Rakoncaj was a member of the 1983 Italian expedition led by Francesco Santon, which made the second successful ascent of the North Ridge (31 July 1983). Three years later, on 5 July 1986, he reached the summit via the Abruzzi Spur (double with Broad Peak West Face solo) as a member of Agostino da Polenza's international expedition.

Together with Radek Jaroš he is one of the most successful Czech climbers based on the number of successful ascents of eight-thousanders. He has never used supplemental bottled oxygen, as he considers that unsportsmanlike. He has written several books about his climbing career.

He is married, has son Lukáš and daughter Lucie. His interests include piloting ultralight aircraft.

== Notable early successful ascents below 8000 m ==
- 1972 – Matterhorn – north face
- 1975 – Koshtan-Tau traverse (5145m) – Dykh-Tau (5198m), (Caucasus)
- 1976 – Trollryggen north face of the Trolls – 1st winter ascent via Rimon route – Norway
- 1976 – Shkara (Caucasus), first ascent of the south face
- 1977 – Kalanka – 6931 m – Garhwal Himalayas – first ascent of the north face
- 1978 – Peak Oshanina 6320 m – Pamir – first ascent of the NE face in alpine style, 53 rope lengths, 6 days, with Slavo Drlik
- 1980 – Monte Agnèr – S wall, Dolomites – 1st winter ascent by Messner route
- 1980 – Yerupaja – 6630 m – Peru – west face
- 1981 – Nanda Devi – 7816 m – Garhwal Himal – first ascent by north pillar
- 1982 – Aiguille du Plan, 1st winter ascent of Gabarrou and Petit Dru, North Face, Grand Couloir, 1st winter ascent

== Ascents of the eight-thousanders ==
- 1983 K2, 8611 m – north pillar (bivouac 50 m below the summit)
- 1984 Lhotse Shar, 8383 m – first ascent of the south face
- 1985 Dhaulagiri, 8167 m – SW pillar by alpine style, unsuccessful, reached 6800 m
- 1986 K2, 8611 m – Abruzzi ridge alpine style
- 1986 Broad Peak, 8047 m – solo ascent of the west face alpine style
- 1987 Mount Everest, 8850 m, on the SW face, unsuccessful, reached 8300 m
- 1987 Mount Everest, 8850 m, on the S face, unsuccessful, reached 8650 m
- 1988 Annapurna, 8091 m – south face – British 1970 route
- 1989 Manaslu, 8163 m – south face
- 1990 Cho Oyu, 8201 m – west face alpine style
- 1990 Shishapangma, 8046 m – north face, alpine style
- 1992 Nanga Parbat, 8125 m – west (Diamir) face, Kinshofer route
- 1993 Makalu, 8463 m, Kukuczka route, unsuccessful, reached 8100 m
- 1994 Mount Everest, 8850 m, on the north face, unsuccessful, reached 7500 m
- 1995 Kangchenjunga, 8586 m, southwest face route, unsuccessful, reached 8000 m
