= Audrey Salkeld =

English mountaineer (died 2023)

Audrey Salkeld (11 March 1936 - 11 October 2023) was an English mountaineer, historian, and author. She reviewed and documented the contents of the archives of the early expeditions to Everest, including researching George Mallory and the events behind his death. That led to her involvement in several books relating to Everest, including The Mystery of Mallory and Irvine and Last Climb.

Her book A Portrait Of Leni Riefenstahl won the Boardman Tasker award for 1996 and she was Chair of Judges for the award in 2014.

She translated from the German books by Reinhold Messner and Kurt Diemberger and co-edited works with David Breashears and Chris Bonington, she also contributed to several documentaries related to mountaineering.

In 2022 Salkeld was made an Honorary Member of the Alpine Club "in recognition of her enormous contribution to mountaineering journalism, literature and film".

== Books ==
- The Mystery of Mallory and Irvine (1986)
- One Step in the Clouds: An omnibus of Mountaineering Novels and Short Stories (1990)
- People in High Places (1991)
- On the Edge of Europe: Mountaineering in the Caucasus (1993)
- Great Climbs: A Celebration of World Mountaineering (1994)
- A Portrait Of Leni Riefenstahl (1996)
- World Mountaineering: The World's Great Mountains by the World's Great Mountaineers (1998)
- Last Climb: The Legendary Everest Expeditions of George Mallory (1999)
- Kilimanjaro: To the Roof of Africa (2002)
