= Bernadette McDonald =

Canadian writer

- Born: Bernadette Kelly; 1951 (age 74–75) Biggar, Saskatchewan, Canada
- Occupation: author
- Genre: Non-fiction
- Notable awards: Alberta Order of Excellence, King Albert Award, Banff Mountain Book Festival: Grand Prize, Boardman Tasker Prize for Mountain Literature 2011 & 2017
- Relatives: Lester Kelly (father), Erna Kelly (mother), Alan McDonald (husband)

Bernadette McDonald (born 1951) is a Canadian-born author of several non-fiction books, primarily on mountain culture topics. Her books include Brotherhood of the Rope, Tomaž Humar, Freedom Climbers, Alpine Warriors, Art Of Freedom, Winter 8000 and Alpine Rising. Sherpas, Baltis, and the Triumph of Local Climbers in the Greater Ranges..

== Life and career ==
McDonald was born in 1951, in Biggar, Saskatchewan, the daughter of Lester and Erna Kelly. She grew up on a prairie farm. Her childhood and most of her education was focused on music, with a special emphasis on the performance of contemporary classical chamber music. She studied at Pacific Lutheran University, the University of Western Ontario and The Banff Centre. She moved to the Canadian Rockies in the early 1970s.

She volunteered for the Banff Mountain Film Festival and she worked at The Banff Centre for twenty years, directing various Banff Mountain festivals and starting the Mountain Culture division. She resigned from her position of vice president, Mountain Culture in 2006 to concentrate on writing.

She lectures on a variety of mountain topics for universities, festivals, and alpine clubs; she consults on mountain cultural issues with start-up festivals and mountain institutes, and curates mountain-related exhibitions. She has a number of honors, including the Alberta Order of Excellence, the Summit of Excellence Award, the King Albert Award and several mountain literary prizes such as the 2011 and the 2017 Boardman Tasker Prize for Mountain Literature. She was Canada's representative at the United Nations to launch the International Year of Mountains.

She lives with her husband Alan McDonald in Banff, Alberta and in Naramata, British Columbia.

== Works ==
=== As author ===
- Alpine Rising. Sherpas, Baltis, and the Triumph of Local Climbers in the Greater Ranges., The Mountaineers Books, 2024
- Winter 8000, Vertebrate / The Mountaineers Books, 2020
- Art of Freedom - The life and climbs of Voytek Kurtyka, Rocky Mountain Books, 2017, Calgary, Alberta
  - Die Kunst der Freiheit. Voytek Kurtyka; Leben und Berge. Transl. Robert Steiner. AS-Verlag, Zurich 2019
  - Voytek Kurtyka, l'Art de la liberté, éditions Paulsen, 2018
- Alpine Warriors, Rocky Mountain Books, 2015, Calgary, Alberta
  - Der Weg zur Spitze. Die Geschichte des slowenischen Alpinismus. Transl. Robert Steiner. AS-Verlag, Zurich 2013
- Keeper of the Mountains: The Elizabeth Hawley Story, Rocky Mountain Books, 2012, Calgary, Alberta
- Freedom Climbers, Rocky Mountain Books, 2011, Calgary, Alberta
  - Klettern für Freiheit. Transl. Robert Steiner. AS-Verlag, Zurich 2013
- Tomaž Humar, Random House, Spring 2008, London
- Brotherhood of the Rope, Baton Wicks, 2007, London
- Brotherhood of the Rope, The Mountaineers Books, 2007, Seattle, Washington
- I'll Call You in Kathmandu: the Elizabeth Hawley Story, The Mountaineers Books, 2005, Seattle
  - Ti telefono a Katmandu, CDA Vivalda Editori, 2006, Turin
  - Wir sehen uns in Kathmandu. Elizabeth Hawley, die Chronistin des Himalaya-Bergsteigens. Bergverlag Rother, Munich 2006
- Ritratti dalle vette, alpinisti fotografati da Craig Richards, Museo della Montagna, 2003

=== As editor ===
- Inspiring Creativity, Banff Centre Press, 2008, Banff
- Whose Water Is It?, National Geographic Books, 2003, Washington, D.C.
- Extreme Landscape, National Geographic Books, 2002, Washington, D.C.
- Voices From the Summit: The World's Great Mountaineers on the Future of Climbing, National Geographic Books, 2000, Washington, D.C.

== See also ==
- Elizabeth Hawley

== Sources ==
- McDonald, Bernadette, Tomaž Humar Prigioniero del Ghiaccio (2009) Versante Sud ISBN 978-88-87890-99-0}
- Himalman's Weblog <http://himalman.wordpress.com/2010/03/16/interview-with-bernadette-mcdonald/>
- Friends of Banff National Park <http://www.friendsofbanff.com/park-radio/podcast/alpine-authors-bernadette-mcdonald/>
- McDonald, Bernadette, Freedom Climbers (2011) ISBN 978-1-926855-60-8.
