= Boardman Tasker Prize for Mountain Literature =

Annual literature award

The Boardman Tasker Prize for Mountain Literature is an annual prize of £3,000 awarded by the Boardman Tasker Charitable Trust to an author or authors for "an original work which has made an outstanding contribution to mountain literature". The prize was established in 1983 in memory of British climbers Peter Boardman and Joe Tasker, both of whom wrote books about their mountaineering expeditions, after their deaths on the northeast ridge of Mount Everest in 1982. It can be awarded for a piece of fiction or non-fiction, poetry or drama, although the work must have been written in (or translated into) English. The prize is announced at the annual Kendal Mountain Festival.

== Winners ==
- 2026 Ed Douglas, Upland
- 2025 Iain Peters, The Corridor
- 2024 Nandini Purandare and Deepa Balsavar, Headstrap: Legends and Lore from the Climbing Sherpas of Darjeeling
- 2023 Katie Brown, Unraveled: A Climber’s Journey through Darkness and Back
- 2022 Brian Hall, High Risk: Climbing to Extinction and Helen Mort, A Line Above the Sky: A Story of Mountains and Motherhood
- 2021 David Smart, Emilio Comici: Angel of the Dolomites
- 2020 Jessica J. Lee, Two Trees Make a Forest: On Memory, Migration and Taiwan
- 2019 Kate Harris, Lands of Lost Borders: A Journey on the Silk Road
- 2018 David Roberts, Limits of the Known
- 2017 Bernadette McDonald, Art of Freedom: The Life and Climbs of Voytek Kurtyka
- 2016 Simon McCartney, The Bond: Two Epic Climbs in Alaska and a Lifetime's Connection Between Climbers
- 2015 Barry Blanchard, The Calling: A Life Rocked by Mountains
- 2014 Jules Lines, Tears of the Dawn
- 2013 Harriet Tuckey, Everest – The First Ascent: The Untold Story of Griffith Pugh, the Man Who Made It Possible
- 2012 Andy Kirkpatrick, Cold Wars: Climbing the Fine Line between Risk and Reality
- 2011 Bernadette McDonald, Freedom Climbers
- 2010 Ron Fawcett with Ed Douglas, Ron Fawcett, Rock Athlete
- 2009 Steve House, Beyond the Mountain
- 2008 Andy Kirkpatrick, Psychovertical
- 2007 Robert Macfarlane, The Wild Places
- 2006 Charles Lind, An Afterclap of Fate: Mallory on Everest
- 2005 Andy Cave, Learning to Breathe
- 2005 Jim Perrin, The Villain: The Life of Don Whillans
- 2004 Trevor Braham, When the Alps Cast Their Spell
- 2003 Simon Mawer, The Fall
- 2002 Robert Roper, Fatal Mountaineer
- 2001 Roger Hubank, Hazard's Way
- 2000 Peter Gillman and Leni Gillman, The Wildest Dream: Mallory – His Life and Conflicting Passions
- 1999 Paul Pritchard, The Totem Pole: And a Whole New Adventure
- 1998 Peter Steele, Eric Shipton: Everest and Beyond
- 1997 Paul Pritchard, Deep Play: A Climber's Odyssey from Llanberis to the Big Walls
- 1996 Audrey Salkeld, A Portrait of Leni Riefenstahl
- 1995 Alan Hankinson, Geoffrey Winthrop Young: Poet, Mountaineer, Educator
- 1994 Dermot Somers, At the Rising of the Moon
- 1993 Jeff Long, The Ascent
- 1992 Will McLewin, In Monte Viso's Horizon: Climbing All the Alpine 4000m Peaks
- 1991 Alison Fell, Mer de Glace
- 1991 Dave Brown and Ian Mitchell, A View from the Ridge
- 1990 Victor Saunders, Elusive Summits
- 1989 M. John Harrison, Climbers
- 1988 Joe Simpson, Touching the Void
- 1987 Roger Mear and Robert Swan, In the Footsteps of Scott
- 1986 Stephen Venables, Painted Mountains: Two Expeditions to Kashmir
- 1985 Jim Perrin, Menlove: The Life of John Menlove Edwards
- 1984 Linda Gill, Living High: A Family Trek in the Himalayas
- 1984 Doug Scott and Alex MacIntyre, The Shishapangma Expedition

== Young Writer's Award ==
In 2012, an award for writers aged between 16 and 25 was introduced for works up to 1,500 words in length that must be "original unpublished literary work, whether fiction, non-fiction, drama or poetry, the central theme of which is concerned with the mountain environment". The prize is £250 and publication in Summit magazine.

== See also ==
- Banff Mountain Book Festival
