= Banff Mountain Book Festival =

Canadian book festival

- Genre: fairs, festivals, conferences
- Location: Banff, Canada
- Inaugurated: 1976
- Organiser: Banff Centre
- Website: banffcentre.ca/banffmountainfestival

The Banff Mountain Book Festival is an annual book festival held every autumn at the Banff Centre in Banff, Canada. The festival started in 1976.

A primary event is the Banf Mountain Book Award.

== Banf Mountain Book Award ==
=== Grand Prize ===
- 1994: Chris Bonington and Audrey Salkeld (editors), Heroic Climbs
- 1995: Thomas Wharton, Icefields
- 1996: Stephen Venables, Himalaya Alpine-Style: The Most Challenging Routes on the Highest Peaks
- 1997: Stefano Ardito, Mont Blanc: Discovery and Conquest of the Giant of the Alps
- 1998: Audrey Salkeld, World Mountaineering: The World's Great Mountains
- 1999: Paul Pritchard, The Totem Pole
- 2000: Bradford Washburn, Bradford Washburn: Mountain Photography
- 2001: Roger Hubank, Hazard's Way
- 2002: W. H. Murray, The Evidence of Things Not Seen: A Mountaineer's Tale
- 2003: David Roberts, Escape from Lucania: An Epic Story of Survival
- 2004: Chris Duff, Southern Exposure: A Solo Sea Kayaking Journey Around New Zealand's South Island
- 2005: Karsten Heuer, Being Caribou: Five Months on Foot with a Caribou Herd
- 2006: Jeff Long, The Wall
- 2007: James M. Tabor, Forever on the Mountain: The Truth Behind One of Mountaineering's Most Controversial and Mysterious Disasters
- 2008: Sid Marty, The Black Grizzly of Whiskey Creek
- 2009: Jerry Moffatt, Niall Grimes, Jerry Moffatt: Revelations
- 2010: John Long, The Stonemasters: California Rock Climbers in the Seventies
- 2011: Bernadette McDonald, Freedom Climbers
- 2012: Philip Connors, Fire Season: Field Notes From a Wilderness Lookout
- 2013: Tim Cope, On the Trail of Genghis Khan: An Epic Journey Through the Land of the Nomads
- 2014: John Porter, One Day as a Tiger: Alex Macintyre and the Birth of Light and Fast Alpinism
- 2015: Richard Wagamese, Medicine Walk
- 2016: Jean McNeil, Ice Diaries: An Antarctic Memoir
- 2017: Jim Herrington, The Climbers
- 2018: Paolo Cognetti, The Eight Mountains
- 2019: Bryce Andrews, The Life and Death of a Grizzly Bear
- 2020: Hank Lentfer, Raven's Witness: The Alaska Life of Richard K. Nelson
- 2021: Suzanne Simard, Finding the Mother Tree: Uncovering the Wisdom and Intelligence of the Forest
- 2022: Jonathan Howland, Native Air
- 2023: Helen Mort, A Line Above the Sky

=== Other categories ===
- Mountain Literature
- Mountain Image
- Adventure Travel
- Mountaineering History
- Guidebook
- Special Jury Mention
- Canadian Rockies Award

== See also ==
- Banff Mountain Film Festival
- Boardman Tasker Prize for Mountain Literature
