= The Human Library =

Movement where real people talk to readers

- Formation: 2000; 26 years ago
- Founder: Ronni Abergel, Dany Abergel, Asma Mouna, and Christoffer Erichsen
- Headquarters: Copenhagen, Denmark
- Website: humanlibrary.org

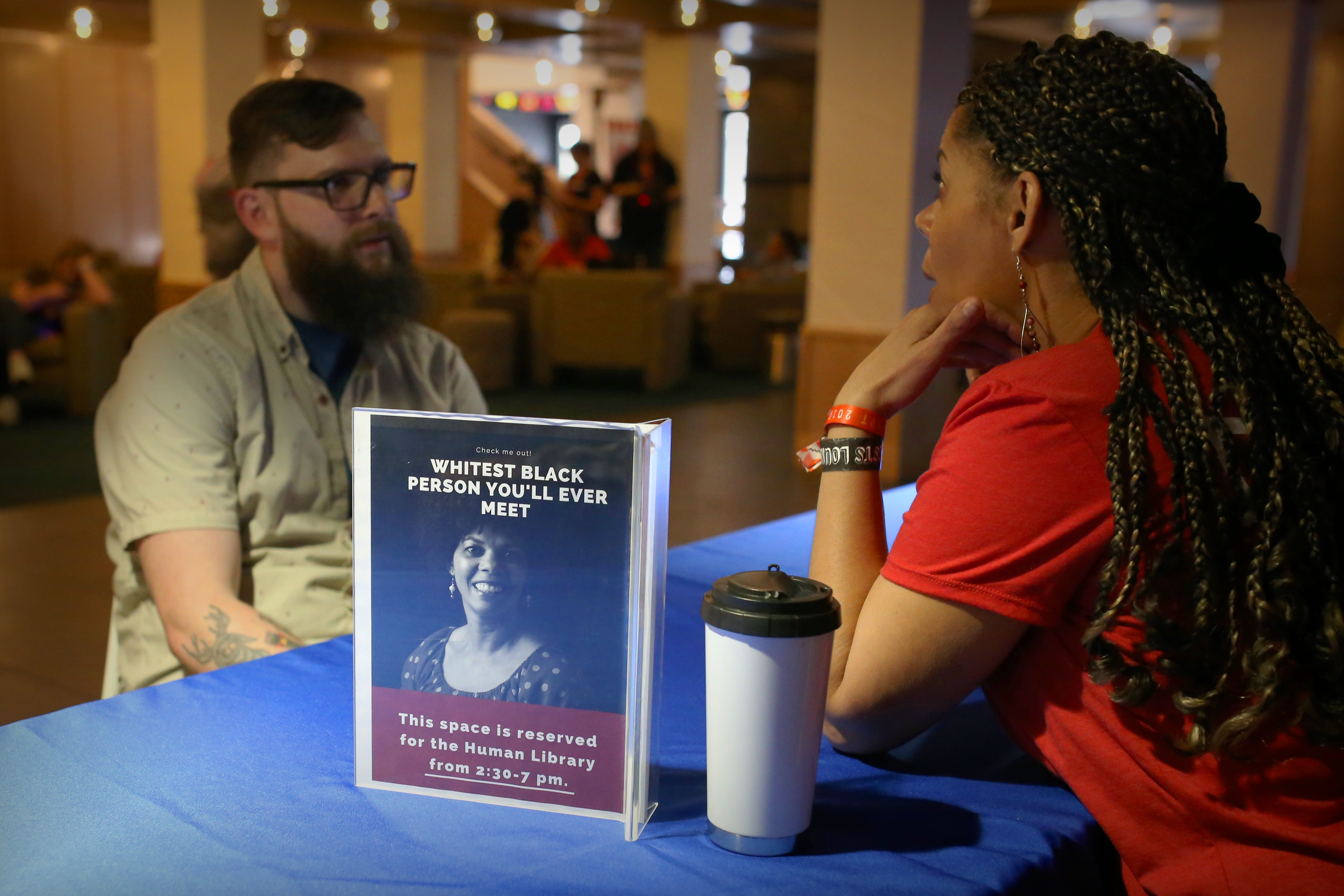
Boisean Leta Neustaedter at the Human Library, a project of the Meridian Library District, at Treefort 2019

The Human Library is an international organization and movement that first started in Copenhagen, Denmark, in 2000. It aims to address people's prejudices by helping them to talk to those they would not normally meet. The organisation uses a library analogy of lending people rather than books. These people have "experienced prejudice, social exclusion or stigma," and participants can ask them questions so as to "learn about the other person and also challenge their own prejudices." The Human Library Organization is active in over 85 countries, in which there are a few permanent Human Libraries but most happen as events.

== History ==
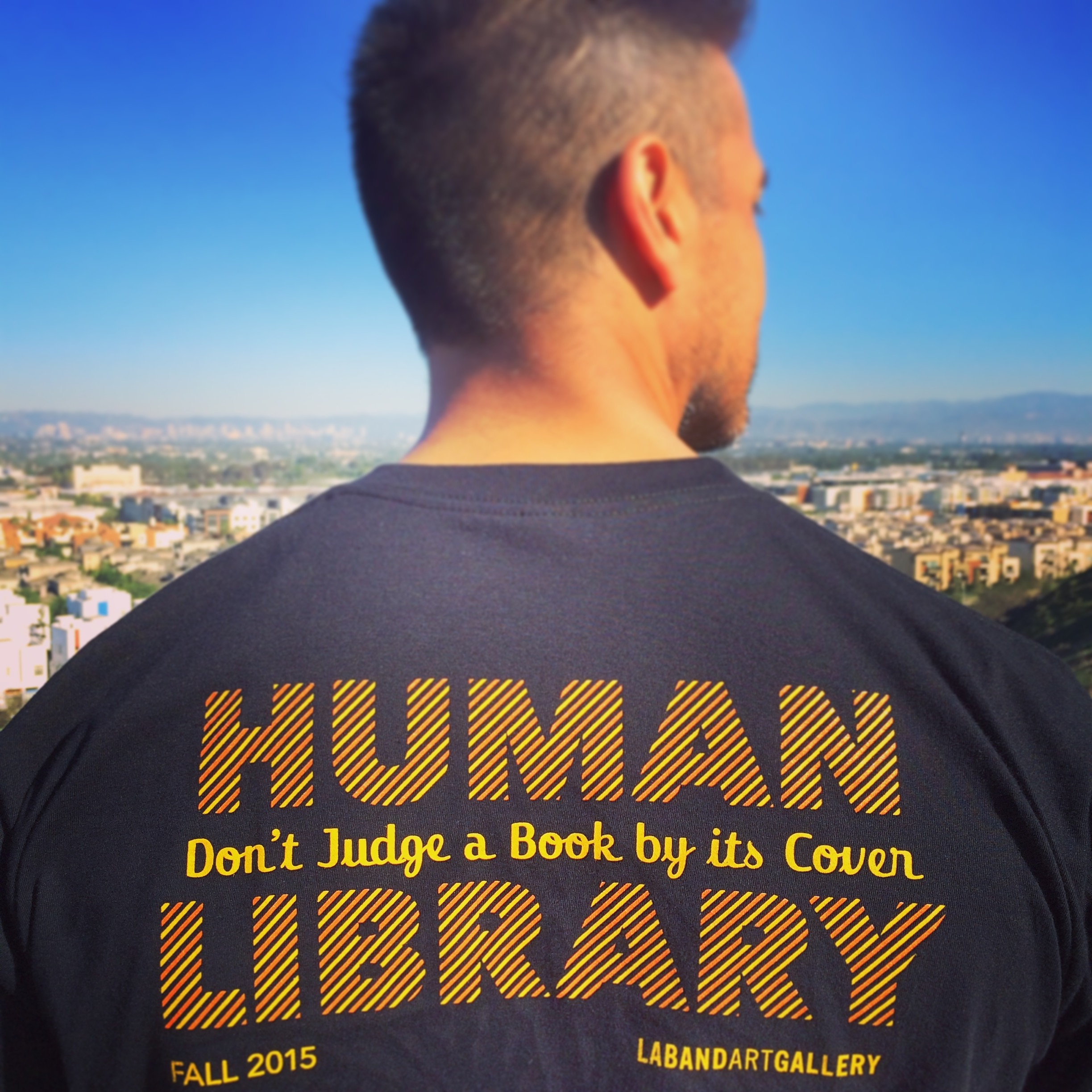
The Human Library t-shirt

The organization began in Copenhagen in 2000 when the first Human Library event was held at Roskilde Festival. The event was run by Ronni and Dany Abergel, Asma Mouna, and Christoffer Erichsen, then working at the Danish Youth NGO Stop Volden (which translates to Stop the Violence), inspired by the American Stop the Violence Movement. The first event ran four days with eight hours of conversations each day and more than 1000 people took part.

The next Human Library was hosted in Oslo, Norway, by Ronni Abergel for the Nordic Minister Councils youth assembly "Unge I Norden". The event was prepared in partnership with Terese Mungai-Foyn and went on to inspire the establishment of the Norwegian Human Library program in 2003.

The first permanent Human Library was established in Lismore, Australia, in 2006. As of 2025, the project has grown to have partners in more than 85 countries across the world.

In October 2025, The Human Library announced that it was closing its Reading Garden in Copenhagen due to funding shortfalls due to the loss of revenue from diversity, equity and inclusion initiatives, particularly in the US. “We’ve definitely felt the change of policy and change of administration in the US, where a lot of our partnerships were from,” Ronni Abergel said in an interview with The World radio show. “People have withdrawn, and we’ve had to reduce our activities and our programming. And, to be honest, we’re hurting.”
