= Mountain Leader Award =

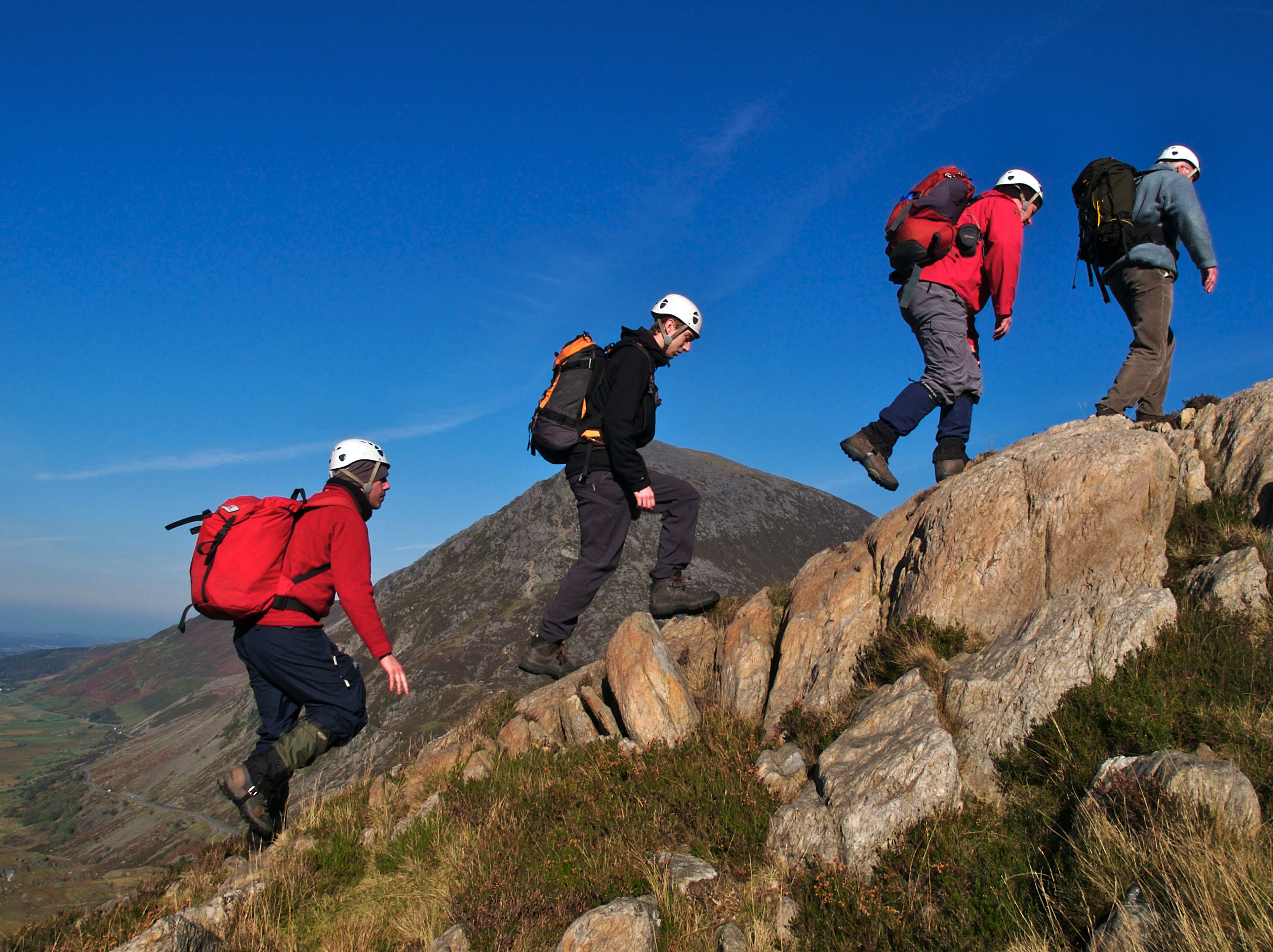
Mountain Leader Trainees from Ogwen Cottage

The Mountain Leader Award (ML) is a qualification for those who want to lead groups hillwalking, map reading and navigating in the uplands, mountains, hills and moorlands of the United Kingdom and Ireland. The awarding body is Mountain Training (MT), the co-ordinating body for mountain training schemes in the UK,

To gain the qualification the candidate must log a minimum of 20 days experience, undertake a Training Course, gain a further minimum of 40 days logged experience and then pass an Assessment Course. The Mountain Leader Award does not cover winter conditions for which there is a further qualification – Winter Mountain Leader. Those who wish to lead groups in the mountains abroad in countries which require a formal qualification usually need to have completed the International Mountain Leader Award (IML) and be a member of a professional association.

== See also ==
- International Mountain Leader
- BAIML
- UIMLA
