= Kenton Cool =

British mountain climber

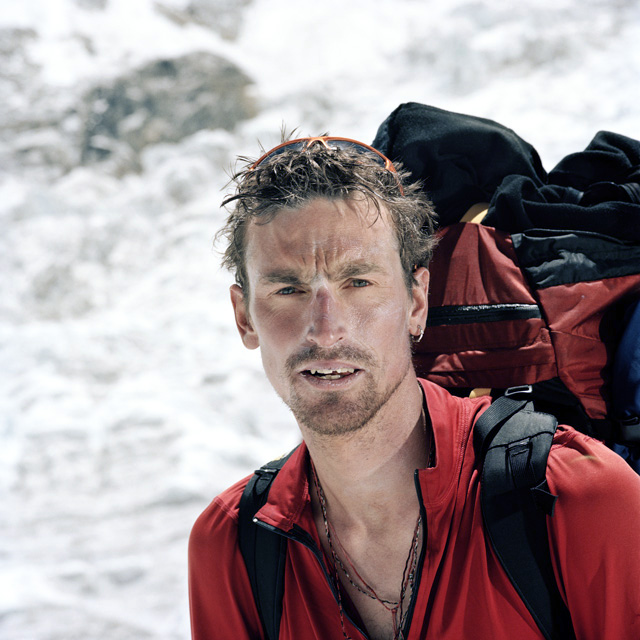
- Kenton Cool
- Born: 30 July 1973 (age 53); Slough, Buckinghamshire, England
- Education: University of Leeds
- Occupations: Mountain guide Motivational speaker
- Known for: Record holder for most number of Mount Everest summits (20) by a non-Sherpa; 1st British ski descent from 8 km peak; Nominee for Piolet d'Or; mountaineering award
- Spouse: Jasmine Black
- Children: 2
- Website: kentoncool.com

Kenton Edward Cool (born 30 July 1973, /kuːl/) is an English climber and mountain guide. He is one of Britain's leading alpine and high altitude climbers. He has reached the summit of Mount Everest 20 times—the most of any non-Nepali. His ascents of Everest include leading Ranulph Fiennes' 2008 and 2009 Expeditions.

He has completed over 45 expeditions in the Greater Ranges and, in 2013, became the first person to climb Nuptse, Everest and Lhotse in a single push without returning to base camp.

== Biography ==
Cool was born in Slough, Buckinghamshire (now Berkshire) in 1973. His family surname was originally Kuhle and was changed during the Second World War by his half-German grandfather. His father was a photographer and his mother a florist, and the family home was near Uxbridge, in Middlesex. He was educated at John Hampden Grammar School in High Wycombe and later at the University of Leeds. Cool graduated from the University of Leeds in 1994 after studying BSc Geological Sciences.

Cool was introduced to mountaineering while in the Scouts. An obsession with rock climbing developed at Leeds University and on graduating he moved to Sheffield to pursue it further.

In 1996 he suffered a fall from a rock face near the Llanberis Pass in north Wales, resulting in calcaneal fractures of both heel bones; he was told by a specialist that "the chances are you will walk with a stick for the rest of your life." A year of surgery and therapy saw him determined to regain his climbing form, and he joined the British Association of Mountain Guides scheme.

In his twenties he did not want to be a guide so worked at "industrial roped access" on tall buildings (including four months on the Millennium Dome). He then guided for Jagged Globe, and then co-founded 'Adventure Base' which is now an established worldwide adventure company. In 2004, when he first met Ranulph Fiennes, he had not completed his guiding qualifications for the Alps, although he had been guiding in Nepal and Everest, the UK and Alaska for years.

Cool married in 2008 and now lives in the village of Bibury in Gloucestershire in the UK. A leading Alpine climber, he operates in the Alps and Greater Ranges of the Himalayas as a fully qualified IFMGA (UIAGM) Guide and Expedition Leader.

Regarding the danger of mountaineering and the many friends he has lost in the sport, he has said: "It's completely unstylish to get stuffed in the mountains... I want to die with my feet up in front of the fire drinking a glass of red wine aged about 95."

In 2003, Cool was nominated alongside climbing partners for the Piolet d'Or award for a route on Annapurna III. In 2012 he made good on an 88-year-old Olympic pledge by taking one of the 1924 Olympic Gold Medals awarded to the 1922 British Everest Expedition (awarded for "Outstanding feats of human endeavour") to the summit of Everest. This prompted Lord Coe to personally thank Cool and his team for helping "kick start the 2012 Olympic Games".

Cool was made an honorary Doctor of Laws by the University of Leeds in July 2018.

== Expedition career ==
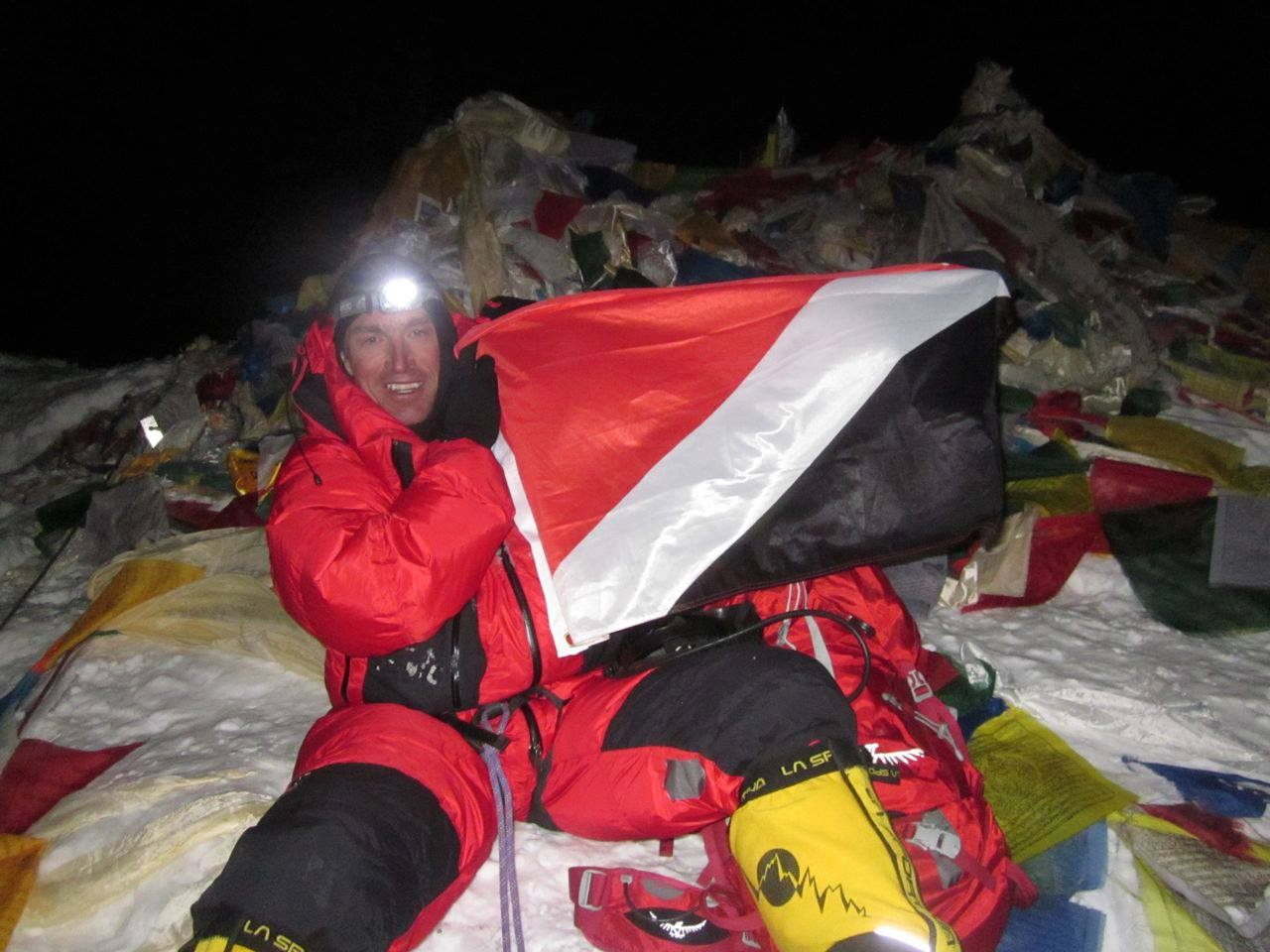
Cool with the flag of the Principality of Sealand at the peak of Mount Everest in 2015

Cool is one of the UK's top mountain and ski expedition leaders, having made several ascents of hard routes with clients, including the first British guided ascent of the north face of the Eiger in 2007 with polar explorer Sir Ranulph Fiennes, then in his sixties, who was initially afraid of heights.

In May 2008, Cool and Fiennes attempted to summit Mount Everest but Fiennes turned back 300m from the top. In 2009, Cool returned to Everest and successfully led Fiennes to the top, making Cool the most successful British expedition leader on the mountain.

In May 2013, Cool, along with climbing partner Dorje Gylgen, attained the Everest Triple Crown. In the space of seven days and without returning to Base Camp, he climbed the three mountains that make up the Everest Horseshoe – Nuptse (7,864 metres), Everest (8,850 metres) and Lhotse (8,516 metres). This was a feat many thought to be impossible, due to the amount of time spent at high altitude and the consequent effect on the human body.

As an expedition leader, Cool has completed over 40 successful expeditions in the Greater Ranges. On Everest, he holds the highest success rate of any mountain guide. He has personally reached the summit of Everest 20 times; in May 2007 he reached the summit twice in one week.

In October 2006, Cool was the first British person to complete a ski descent of an 8,000-metre peak, on Cho Oyu in Nepal, the 6th highest mountain in the world. In 2010 Cool made the third ski descent of Manaslu in Nepal, the world's 8th highest mountain.

In January 2015, Cool reached the summit of Everest for an 11th time. At the top, he held a flag for the Principality of Sealand to symbolize his support for the micronation.

On 12 May 2016, Kenton, at 42, was joined by two Sherpas and another Briton, Robert Lucas, on the summit of Everest. The Britons were the first foreign climbers to reach the 8,850 metre (29,035 ft) peak in two years, after a group of Sherpa guides fixing ropes got to the top the day before. On 15 May 2022, Cool achieved his record-breaking 16th Everest summit, the most climbs by any non-Sherpa. Cool was wearing a hand-painted protective helmet by British contemporary artist Teddy McDonald.

Cool broke his own Everest record four more times: in May 2023, May 2024, May 2025 and on 22 May 2026, reaching the summit for the 20th time. As of June 2026, this is 4 times more than any other non-Nepali climber and 10 times more than any other British climber.

== Major climbing routes ==
Climbing route ascents
Mountain/location	Route	Ascent info.
Mount Hunter Alaska	Moonflower Buttress	1st British ascent
Mount Hunter Alaska	Mini Moonflower	1st ascent
Denali Alaska	Extra Terrestrial Brothers, Father and Son's Wall	1st ascent
Denali Alaska	Denali Diamond, SW Face	2nd ascent
Arwa Spire India	East Ridge, East Spire	1st ascent
Annapurna III Nepal	SW Ridge	1st ascent
L'Olan, Ecrins, France	L'Olan couloir	1st ascent

== Television work ==
As part of the Eiger expedition in 2007, ITN set up a simulcast at the foot of the mountain, allowing Cool, Fiennes and Parnell to broadcast live from the mountain face and straight into the ITN News studio. Their summit attempt was broadcast on each live news section for five days. A further one-hour documentary of the successful climb was aired on BBC Four and The Discovery Channel.

As part of his 2007 Everest expedition, Cool took part in filming for the five-part BBC Television documentary Everest ER. As well as providing extensive interview material for the documentary, Cool was also given specialist high-altitude camera equipment to capture footage high on the mountain, including summit footage. Everest ER followed Cool's expedition as it unfolded, which included his double summit in one week. The programme was aired over five weeks on BBC1.

== Charitable activity ==
In March 2007, Cool was part of a three-man team (with Sir Ranulph Fiennes and Ian Parnell) to raise funds for the Marie Curie Eiger Challenge Appeal. A successful ascent of the north face of the Eiger raised £1.8 million for the Marie Curie Cancer Care charity. In May 2009, Cool and Fiennes raised a further £2.6 million for the charity as part of the Everest Challenge Appeal, Cool unfurling Marie Curie flag on the mountain's summit.

Annually, Cool provides a series of speaking events for the Royal Geographical Society and various outdoor clothing manufacturers and retailers, as well as giving keynote speeches at corporate conferences. He has also been invited to sit on specialist panels. At these events, he heavily supports and promotes Porters Progress, a foundation set up to support the mountain-portering community in Nepal. Porters Progress is now part of the dZi Foundation.

== Personal life ==
In 2008 Cool married Jazz Black, whom he had met in Chamonix, France. They were married in Fairford, Gloucestershire and have lived there and in Bibury, also in Gloucestershire. They have two children.

== Everest summits ==
1. 15 May 2004
2. 31 May 2005
3. 17 May 2006
4. 17 May 2007
5. 24 May 2007
6. 24 May 2008
7. 21 May 2009
8. 17 May 2010
9. 6 May 2011
10. 25 May 2012
11. 19 May 2013
12. 12 May 2016
13. 16 May 2018
14. 16 May 2019
15. 11 May 2021
16. 14 or 15 May 2022
17. 17 May 2023
18. 12 May 2024
19. 18 May 2025
20. 22 May 2026

== Other eight-thousanders summits ==
- Manaslu 30 September 2010
- Lhotse 20 May 2013
- Lhotse 12 May 2021
- K2 28 July 2021

== See also ==
- Cool, Kenton (2015). One Man's Everest. London: Preface (Penguin Random House). ISBN 9781848094482.
- List of Mount Everest summiters by number of times to the summit
