= Chomo =

Chomo may refer to:

- Prison slang for child molester
- The name of several mountains in the Himalayas, including Chomo Lhari, Chomo Yummo, and Chomo Lonzo
- the Chumbi Valley, called Chomo in Tibet
- Chomo County, also called Yadong County, which spans the Chumbi Valley
