= Roger Payne (mountaineer) =

British mountaineer (1956–2012)

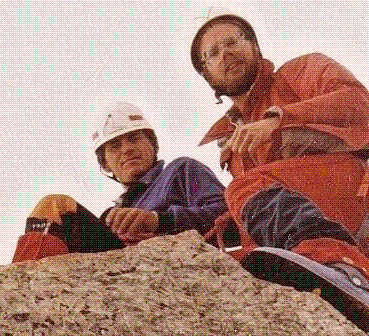
- Roger Payne and David Callaway on the summit of La Nonne in Chamonix

Personal information
- Nationality: British
- Born: Hammersmith, London England

Climbing career
- Type of climber: Alpine climbing
- Major ascents: Lobuje

Roger Payne (16 July 1956 – 12 July 2012) was a British mountaineer and alpinist. He was the general secretary of the British Mountaineering Council (BMC), and a qualified mountain guide from 1983, taking part in over 20 expeditions to the Karakoram and Himalayan ranges, including to K2 and the north face of Changabang. He was an avalanche instructor and climbed in the Alps every year from 1977.

== Biography ==
Payne grew up in Hammersmith, London, and took an education degree in 1983 at Sunderland Polytechnic where he was president of the mountaineering club. He then became a teacher and climbing instructor and he later moved to Leysin, Switzerland.

Payne was president of the British Mountain Guides Association and, after his death, was given honorary membership of the International Federation of Mountain Guide Associations (IFMGA)

== Death ==
Payne was killed aged 55 with eight other climbers by an avalanche whilst traversing Mont Maudit, on the Mont Blanc massif, near Chamonix in the French Alps on 12 July 2012.

== Notable climbs ==
- 2007 - Brumkhangshe, Pheling, Chombu, Eagle Peak
- 2006 - Chogyl, Frontier Peak, Koktang, Ratong
- 2005 - Lama Lamani, Mount Tinchenchang
- 2004 - Thangsing Valley
- 2004 - Chomolhari
- 2003 - Mount Grosvenor
- 2002 - Island Peak
- 2000 - Pumari Chhish
- 1999 - Pumari Chhish
- 1998 - Meru
- 1997 - Changabang
- 1996 - Changabang
- 1995 - Tirsuli West
- 1994 - Nanda Devi East
- 1993 - K2
- 1992 - Broad Peak
- 1991 - Khan Tengri, Pobeda
- 1989 - Lobuje East
- 1988 - Mount Foraker, Mount McKinley
- 1987 - Gasherbrum 6, Gasherbrum 2
- 1986 - Rusac, Peru
- 1985 - Millpuqrahu, Kayish
- 1983 - Meru
- 1982 - Mount McKinley

== See also ==
- Climbing
