= John Fischer (mountaineer) =

American mountaineer (1946–2010)

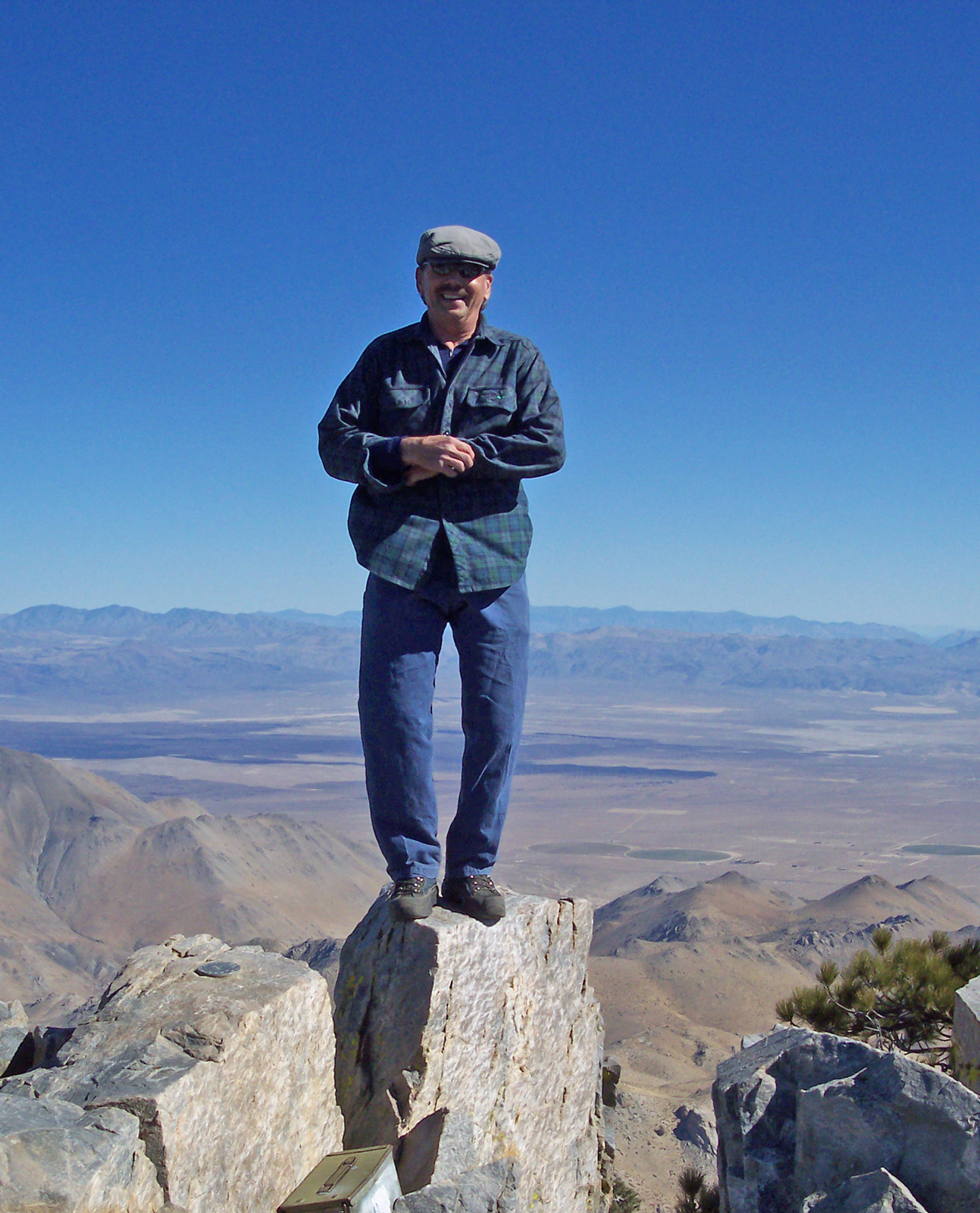
- John Fischer on Owens Peak

Personal information
- Nationality: American
- Born: September 13, 1946 Pontiac, Illinois
- Died: June 5, 2010 (aged 63) Mono County, CA
- Spouses: Lois Fischer; Alex Fischer
- Children: Zane Fischer Joy Fischer

Climbing career
- Major ascents: Palisade Crest Traverse, Sun Ribbon Aréte

John Fischer (September 13, 1946 – June 5, 2010) was an American mountaineer, climbing guide and route pioneer, and was one of the 11 founding members of the American Mountain Guides Association in 1979. He was the owner of the Palisade School of Mountaineering in Bishop, California.

Fischer was credited with starting the first mountain medicine courses in the United States, and made the first successful traverse of the crest of the Palisades from Southfork Pass in Big Pine Canyon to the summit of Mount Agassiz.

== Early life ==
John Fischer was born September 13, 1946, in Pontiac, Illinois. When he was in second grade his family moved to San Antonio, Texas.

By 1960 the Fischers had moved to California's Santa Clara Valley. He graduated from Pacific High School in the Santa Cruz Mountains. In the summer of 1964, at the age of 17, he hitchhiked to Alaska, where he and three other teens made the first ascent of Mount Carpathian in the Chugach Mountains.

== Climbing career ==
Fischer moved to the Haight-Ashbury, went to San Francisco Art Institute for a semester, and then dropped out of college. He registered for the draft as a conscientious objector at the onset of the Vietnam War and was assigned to civilian duty. In 1967 he discovered Yosemite Valley's big walls and started rock climbing. He moved to the Eastern Sierra, taking up residence first at the Cardinal Village Resort in Bishop, California, then at Fobes 40 in Crowley Lake, California, with his first wife, Alex Fischer and their son.

In 1969, Fischer made his first of several first ascents on Temple Crag, climbing the entire Sun Ribbon Aréte, one of the Celestial Arétes. In 1970, Fischer joined Mountain Travel as a guide on both domestic and international trips, working for Allen Steck, Leo LeBon, Barry Bishop and Alan Schmitz. He also guided for Mountain Travel's Palisade School of Mountaineering in Bishop, California, and was offered the job of director after two years, but declined and recommended Smoke Blanchard instead.

In 1976, Fischer bought Palisade School of Mountaineering from Mountain Travel, operating it for the next 13 years with second wife, Lois Fischer. He guided nearly 125 international trips, 47 of those to the mountains of Mexico. He made thousands of ascents with clients in the Sierra, including at least 150 ascents of Mount Sill (90 up the Swiss Aréte); and 50 ascents of Mount Whitney via its technical routes. The school closed in 1989, falling victim to "rogue guides who operated without permits."

In July, 1979, Fischer made one of the most important technical traverses in Sierra mountaineering history, successfully traversing the crest of the Palisade from Southfork Pass in Big Pine Canyon to the summit of Mt. Agassiz near Bishop Pass. In his 1980 account, published in the American Alpine Journal he wrote, "The Palisade, with many small glaciers and five peaks over 14,000 feet, is the most alpine region of the range. Atypical of the range in general, the mountains are precipitous on all sides and connected by narrow ridges . . . The traverse is eight miles long: a mile and a half of moderate 5th Class (editor's note: currently rated VI 5.9), some snow and mixed pitches, and acres of scrambling. The complete traverse took seven days and seven bivouacs, with approximately 12,000‐feet gained and lost respectively . . . Indeed, the situation is fantastic and the quality of the climbing outstanding: the rock varies from the finest High Sierra granite to teetering stacks of shattered diorite."

The first attempt to do the traverse was in 1969, followed by several more unsuccessful attempts by other parties. Vern Clevenger and Nigel Gifford attempted the route, but aborted four days into the venture having run out of food. Fischer made three attempts before successfully completing the traverse in July, 1979. Doug Robinson accompanied Fischer on the first attempt which ended within hours of starting. The second time Fischer attempted the traverse with Jerry Adams, one of his climbing clients, a severe electrical storm put an end to that trip.

The third time Fischer and Adams attempted the traverse, it was a success. Mountaineering historian Andy Selters described it: "...along eight miles of toothy stone...nabbing every significant summit and making over 20 rappels... It was a feat of technical endurance that few appreciated."

In his later years, Fischer was active with the Sierra Club, guiding many of the members of its Sierra Peaks Section up technical routes. His brother was Michael Fischer, executive director of the Sierra Club from 1987 to 1992.

== Death ==
Fischer was killed on June 5, 2010, in a motorcycle collision with a deer near Conway Summit on U.S. Route 395.

== Legacy ==
John’s daughter, Joy Fischer lives in Seattle with her husband Michael and their son Ethan. Michael works for Microsoft and Joy is very involved with St. Joseph School and several other volunteer activities.

His son Zane Fisher, a reporter in Santa Fe, New Mexico, erected a steel descanso, a roadside memorial at the spot where he died. The memorial combines an ice axe with a peace symbol.

His sister, Kate Farrell, continues to remember John as a storyteller in her published works as an author and online.

In 2011, the John Fischer Memorial Route in Pine Creek was established and climbed by Bishop residents Tai and Mary Devore.
