= Irish Mountaineering Club =

Mountaineering club in Ireland

The Irish Mountaineering Club (in Irish, Cumann Sléibhteoireachta na hÉireann, usually called "The IMC") is a mountaineering club whose activities include climbing. The club has over 200 members.

== History ==
The IMC was founded in 1942 by Bill Perrott and a group of other climbers in south Dublin, within easy reach of Dalkey Quarry. They established several climbs in Dalkey and at other locations around Dublin such as The Scalp, Bray Head, and Ireland's Eye; these were the first steps in the development of climbing in Ireland. This group, now known as "The Old IMC", disbanded in 1944.

In 1948, the IMC was revived on a more formal basis by Perrott, Joss Lynam, and others, with the intention that it become a national club drawing its membership from all around Ireland, with local branches in the major cities. The first president was the naturalist Robert Lloyd Praeger.

During the 1950s branches of the IMC were established in Dublin and Belfast, and one for the "Wild Geese", Irish emigrants living abroad. In 1957, with the aid of a grant from the Guinness brewing company, the club purchased a farmhouse at Glendasan, near Glendalough, County Wicklow, and converted it into a mountain hut, to be run by the Dublin section. Later another hut (called the "Bloat House") was established in the Annalong valley in the Mourne Mountains in County Down; this was to be run by the Belfast section.

The increasing affluence of the 1960s saw the emergence of other mountaineering clubs in Ireland, and the IMC's dominance began to weaken. In 1971, the Federation of Mountaineering Clubs of Ireland (FMCI, later the Mountaineering Council of Ireland (MCI), now Mountaineering Ireland) was formed, which ended the IMC's national aspirations. The struggling Belfast section was finally dissolved in 1991, two years after the Bloat House burnt down resulting in several serious injuries.

== Activities ==
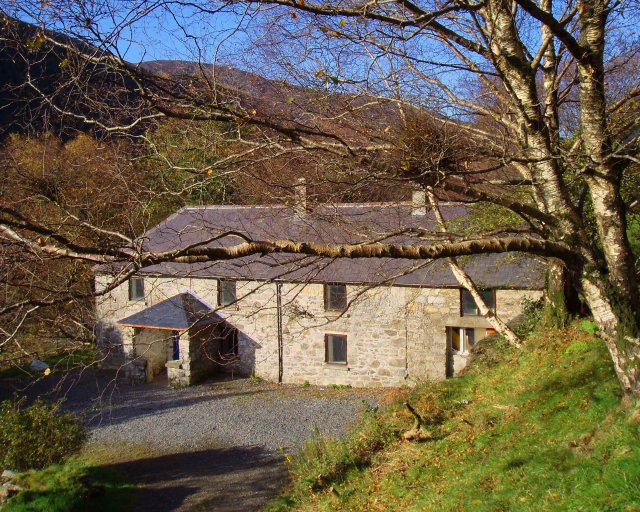
The IMC Hut

The IMC operates a programme of activities throughout the year. In the spring, the climbing season starts with the long-standing (since 1966) annual rock-climbing beginners' course conducted by experienced club members in Dalkey Quarry and Glendalough. Those beginners are then encouraged to develop their skills and join in the club's climbing activities in Ireland and abroad throughout the summer and beyond. Summer is also the peak alpine season, when many groups of members climb in alpine ranges throughout the world. In winter indoor climbing, hillwalking, ice climbing abroad, and rock climbing both at home and in sunnier climes in Europe and beyond.

The club's hut (called "The IMC Hut") is located in Glendasan, in the Wicklow Mountains and within walking distance of the popular crag at Glendalough. Its main use now is to serve as accommodation for pre-booked groups.

== See also ==
- Kangla Tarbo 1 - first climbed by IMC members
- Ramabang - first climbed by IMC members

== Notable members ==
- J. C. Coleman - geographer, archaeologist, speleologist and writer
- Harold Drasdo - climber, writer and educationalist
- Joss Lynam - mountaineer, explorer and writer
- Sé O Hanlon - cyclist and club treasurer
- Robert Lloyd Praeger - naturalist, writer and librarian
- Frank Winder - biochemist and naturalist

== References and sources ==
Notes

Sources

- IMC50: The Golden Jubilee of the Irish Mountaineering Club 1948-1998, edited by J. Lynam and P. O'Neill (IMC, 1998)
