= Hans Gmoser =

Mountain guide

- Born: Johann Wolfgang Gmoser; July 7, 1932; Linz, Austria
- Died: July 5, 2006 (aged 73); Canmore, Alberta, Canada
- Occupation: mountaineer
- Known for: Canadian Mountain Holidays
- Awards: Order of Canada, Golden Jubilee Medal, Honour Roll of Canadian Skiing

Johann Wolfgang "Hans" Gmoser, CM (July 7, 1932 – July 5, 2006) was a founder of modern mountaineering in Canada. Born in Austria in 1932, he moved to Canada in 1951, and was a major driving force behind the growing popularity of climbing, skiing and guiding.

In the 1950s he pioneered new rock climbs, most notably Grillmair Chimneys (1952), Calgary Route (1953) - with Franz Dopf leading, and Diretissima (1957) on Yamnuska. He made the third (and first Canadian) ascents of both Mount Alberta (1958) and Brussels Peak (1960). He participated in what may have been the first ascent of Alaska's Mount Blackburn in 1958, and led very successful expeditions to Mount Logan (east ridge) in 1959, and to Mount McKinley (Wickersham Wall) in 1963. In 1961 he climbed a difficult new route on the south face of Mount Louis. He was described as "a good leader. He always had plans and he did his darndest to make his dreams come true."

Gmoser a mountain guide. For years travelled throughout North America, presenting his films and promoting the Canadian mountain experience. In 1963 he was a founding member of the Association of Canadian Mountain Guides (ACMG) and was its first technical chairman. In 1957 he founded Rocky Mountain Guides which eventually grew to become Canadian Mountain Holidays (CMH), advertised as the largest mountain adventure operation in the world. CMH is where Gmoser made his mark in heliskiing.

== Honors ==
Gmoser was elected an honorary member of The Alpine Club of Canada (1986), was awarded the Order of Canada (1987) and Golden Jubilee Medal (2002), received the Banff Mountain Film Festival Summit of Excellence award (1989), was elected to the Honour Roll of Canadian Skiing (1989), was named an honorary member of the International Federation of Mountain Guides Association (1992), in 1997 was elected Honorary President of the ACMG, presented a Lifetime Achievement Award from the North American Snowsports Journalists Association in 1998, was inducted to the US National Ski Hall of Fame and the Canadian Tourism Hall of Fame.

== Works ==
=== Bibliography ===
- Gmoser, Hans (1986) Operations Guidelines Association of British Columbia Heli-Ski Operators
- Gmoser, Hans (1996) The CMH gallery: a visual celebration of CMH Heli-Skiing and Heli-Hiking Altitude Publishing, Ltd. ISBN 9781551531168

=== Filmography ===
- With skis and rope (1958)
- Ski trails (1959)
- Vagabonds of the mountains (1960)
- Of skiers and mountains (1961)
- Deep powder and steep rock (1962)
- To The Forbidden Snowfields (1963)
- Skis Over McKinley (1964)
- Adventure Bound #1 and #2 (1965)
- Roving skis (1966)
- High Road to Skiing (1967)
- Rendezvous in the Selkirks (1967)
