= Tribevine =

Tribevine, Inc.
- Company type: Private company
- Industry: Internet
- Founded: Oulu, Finland, Finland (2008)
- Headquarters: Oulu, Finland
- Key people: Juho Risku, Co-Founder in 2008, CEO, Riku Karjalainen, Co-Founder, Ossi Karhunen, Co-Founder, Mikko Hopia, Co-Founder, Ville Jurkkala, Co-Founder
- Website: www.tribevine.com

Tribevine is a company that collects sports and outdoor gear information using crowdsourcing into a user edited semi structured product information database. In effect it is a Wikipedia-type of free / open community edited product information database, where users can add their own items, enrich the existing items as well as rate and review them. Right now most of the content is climbing, mountaineering, ski touring and other mountain sports related. The business model of Tribevine relies on crowdsourcing of market research information. Tribevine has been established in 2008 by Juho Risku and four other co-founders. In 2011 Tribevine was selected to present at the Nordic Venture Forum among the roughly 50 other most promising start-ups from the northern Europe.

== How It Works ==
Tribevine gets the initial set of data from brand owners. Users can then edit this information, rate and review the products as well as add new products. As a part of this refining process Tribevine sees the users' relation to products and activities, information which is then used to match the products and the users that are interested in those products. Tribevine also re-packages and sells non identifiable market research data which is based on users activities in the system.

== History ==
- Founded in 18.12.2008
- Open beta opened in 29.3.2011
- IFMGA partnership announced in 21.2.2012

== See also ==
- Crowdsourcing
- Market Research
