= American Mountain Guides Association =

The American Mountain Guides Association (AMGA) is a non-profit organization that represents the interests of American mountain guides and climbing instructors by providing support, education, and standards. They are the sole US representative to International Federation of Mountain Guides Associations (IFMGA), the international governing body responsible for guiding standards and education around the world. The American Mountain Guide Certification is the highest credential for professional mountain guides in the US.

In addition to AMGA's mission to train guides, promote professional standards, and support its members, they also advocate for access to public lands and responsible stewardship of natural resources.

== History ==
In 1979, four guides met with the goal of creating an organization that built connections and resources between mountain guides. The guides were Yvon Chouinard, Jim Donini, Harry Frishman, and Peter Lev. They created what was called the Moose Bar Charter, named so because the first meeting was at Dornan's Bar in Moose, Wyoming. Doug Robinson was elected the first President.

In 1980, twelve guides met in Las Vegas and began the American Professional Mountain Guides Association (APMGA). Initially membership equaled certification and members were admitted by recommendation.

In 1985 a group of guides met in the Tetons due to insurance concerns. It was difficult for insurance companies to assess guide services and smaller companies were not able to get coverage. There was a push for making the APGMA a stronger national organization. Ian Wade was elected President and served for five years. The new board worked with insurance companies and communicated the risk management procedures.

Part of the new structure was to develop the Rock Guide program. Hans Gmoser and Karl Klassen were the first mentors. The first exam was held in Boulder, Colorado in 1990. In 1991 the first Alpine exam was in the North Cascades of Washington. The first ski guiding exam was in 1993. The program was led by Jean Pavillard and Bela Vadasz.

In 1991 the organization applied for admission to the International Federation of Mountain Guides Associations. For several years they developed the programs and worked on certification requirements. In 1995 Mark Houston presented the programs for admission. The Rock and Alpine were up to standard but the Ski program was not. They were admitted in 1997.

In 2010 the first Climbing Wall Instructor course manual was published. The Single Pitch Manual was released in 2014. Both received International Climbing and Mountaineering Federation endorsement in 2014.

== Programs ==
AMGA offers certification for both guides and instructors. Guides take certification in Alpine, Rock, and Ski Guiding. Completing all three programs takes 85 days in total. Additionally guides must maintain certification in CPR and Wilderness first responder. Those working in avalanche-prone areas also need avalanche specific training. It is possible to take any of the three guide courses individually, however only those who complete all three earn the title of American Mountain Guide.

The organization also has Climbing Instructor programs. There are two types, Single Pitch Instructor and Climbing Wall Instructor.

AMGA also provides business accreditation on a voluntary basis. Businesses are thoroughly evaluated to ensure they meet industry standards, that guides are rigorously trained, and that they promote ethical business practices. This involves things like examining guide resumes, checking emergency protocols, and analyzing communication to participants.

== Presidents ==
- Doug Robinson
- Ian Wade
- Rob Hess
- John Cleary
- Margaret Wheeler
- Angela Hawse
- Silas Rossi
