= Momentum Adventure =

- "Let Us Take You There."
- Industry: Adventure travel
- Founded: London, United Kingdom (January 1, 2005)
- Founder: Matthew Robertson
- Headquarters: East Sussex, United Kingdom
- Number of employees: 5 -10
- Website: www.momentumadventure.com

Momentum Adventure is a travel company founded in 2005 by Matthew Robertson. The company specializes in creating personalized itineraries tailored to clients' interests and aspirations regarding their travel needs.

Momentum Adventure offers unique experiences that expose clients to new activities and destinations.

== Reception ==
The Momentum guides with the highest IFMGA accreditation include: Johan Aregard, a former Swedish Special Forces soldier; Dave Pearce, a former Royal Marine and survival consultant for Bear Grylls; and John Falkiner, a film stunt coordinator.

== See also ==
- Adventure Travel
- Backpacking (travel)
- Backpacking (hiking)
- Experimental travel
- Long distance motorcycle riding
- Outdoor education
- Parachuting
- Travel documentary
- Travel writing
