= ACMG =

ACMG may refer to:

- Association of Canadian Mountain Guides
- American College of Medical Genetics and Genomics
