= Joss Lynam =

Irish mountaineer and civil engineer

Joss Lynam (born as James Perry O’Flaherty Lynam; 29 June 1924 – 9 January 2011) was an Irish civil engineer who was known as a mountaineer, hillwalker, orienteer, writer and sports administrator. He was one of Ireland's most influential figures in outdoor activities.

== Early life ==
Lynam was born in London to Irish parents Edward and Martha (née Perry). Lynam and his older sister Biddy were both raised in London, where his father worked as curator of maps in the British Museum. This is where Lynam was first introduced to cartography. The family would frequently return to the West coast of Ireland for holidays. Here, Lynam found his love for mountaineering, and climbed his first mountain - Knocknarea, County Sligo - with his aunt.

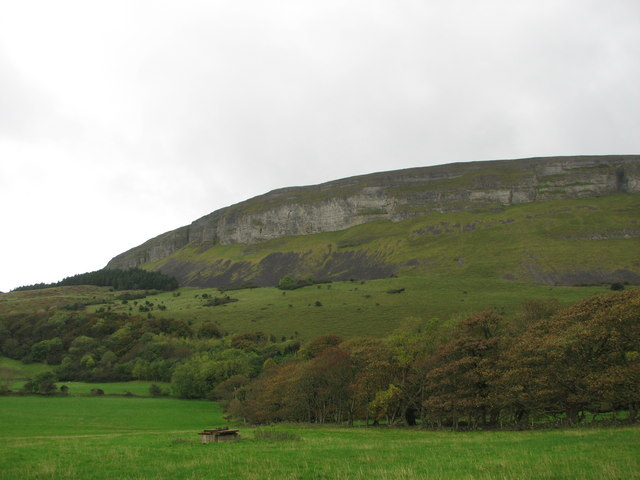
Knocknarea Mountain, in County Sligo, the first mountain Lynam climbed

At 18, Lynam joined the British army and trained as an officer. He was deployed to India in 1944 under the Corps of Royal Engineers where he spent the remainder of World War II. While there, he participated in the first of his many Himalayan expeditions, climbing Kolahoi Peak. Lynam returned to the UK in 1947, and the following year he moved to Dublin and enrolled in Trinity College Dublin to study engineering. He graduated in 1951.

== Biography ==
Lynam was a civil engineer by profession but devoted most of his life to mountaineering. He climbed extensively in Ireland, Britain, the Alps and in India. He was leader, or deputy leader, of expeditions to Greenland, the Andes, Kashmir, Tien Shan, Garhwal, Tibet and India, including the 1987 expedition to Changtse, which was the forerunner to the successful first Irish ascent of Everest in 1993.

He promoted access and developing waymarked trails. He was involved in the creation and administration of the Federation of Mountaineering Clubs of Ireland (now Mountaineering Ireland), the Association for Adventure Sports, Bord Oiliúint Sléibhte (Irish Mountain Training Board), Tiglin (National Outdoor Training Centre [now defunct]), Outdoor Education Ireland, and Cospóir (now the Irish Sports Council) and the National Waymarked Ways Advisory Committee.

He was a founder member of the Irish Mountaineering Club, IMC, serving as president from 1982 to 1984. and he was also a founder member of both the Irish Orienteers and Three Rock Orienteering Club. He was president of the Union Internationale des Associations d'Alpinisme's expeditions commission in the 1990s.

He wrote and edited guide books to walking and climbing in Ireland. He helped create and was editor of The Mountain Log (the journal of Mountaineering Ireland).

== Family life ==
Lynam met his future wife, Nora Gorevan, when she joined the IMC, the mountaineering club founded by Joss and Bill Perrott in 1948. The couple married on his graduation in 1951. Nora was among the first women to join this club. They had two daughters and a son.

Lynam's father, Edward, was a map curator and author of numerous books about maps and map-making. His parents loved the outdoors, and there were frequent family outings to destinations such as Connemara.

== Career ==
Joss Lynam, otherwise known formally as James Perry O’Flaherty, had multiple careers: A military career, an engineering career, and a mountaineering career which was the contribution he is best known for.

At just eighteen, Lynam arrived in India in order to carry out military service. However, he described his time there as “quiet”.

In 1948, upon arriving in Ireland, he began to study engineering at Trinity College Dublin. During his time there, Lynam and a friend, Bill Perrott, founded the Irish Mountaineering Club. One of Lynam's main priorities was for the club to be open to both men and women. Lynam led the club's first expedition to the Alps after just eight months of its founding.

Being an engineer allowed Lynam to travel to regions of quite mountainous terrain, beginning a crossover in two of his biggest passions, engineering and hill-walking. He was an expert in drystone construction and took his civil engineering job seriously. One of Lynam's biggest projects was at the Skellig Michael heritage site in County Kerry, where he was the project engineer.

Lynam had completed major expeditions such as the Alps and Mount Kolahoi before commencing his engineering career. However, he described his mountaineering skills as self-taught and is unsure of how he survived.

He was involved in the Irish Sports Council for 10 years, giving suggestions for outdoor activities being managed by Vocational Education Committees in Ireland. His volunteering work was recognized in 2005 after he received the Irish Sport's Council inaugural Sport Volunteer of the Year award.

He also re-analysed mountains in Connemara in 1988, after realizing that Ordnance Survey maps of the area were inaccurate.

In 1983, he became redundant but remained positive as if gave him time to focus on his love of mountaineering.

In 1991, Lynam and British climber Mike Banks were joint leaders in a veteran mountaineering trip to Jaonli peak in India, where an earthquake struck nearby within the proximity of only 15 km. In 1993, Lynam aided the foundation to the successful first Irish ascent of Everest from his previous leadership of the 1987 expedition to Changtse. Lynam led his sixth expedition in 1987 to the Himalayan Peak, Changtse at 7,500m at 67 years old, while also recovering from a coronary by-pass.

== Later life and death ==
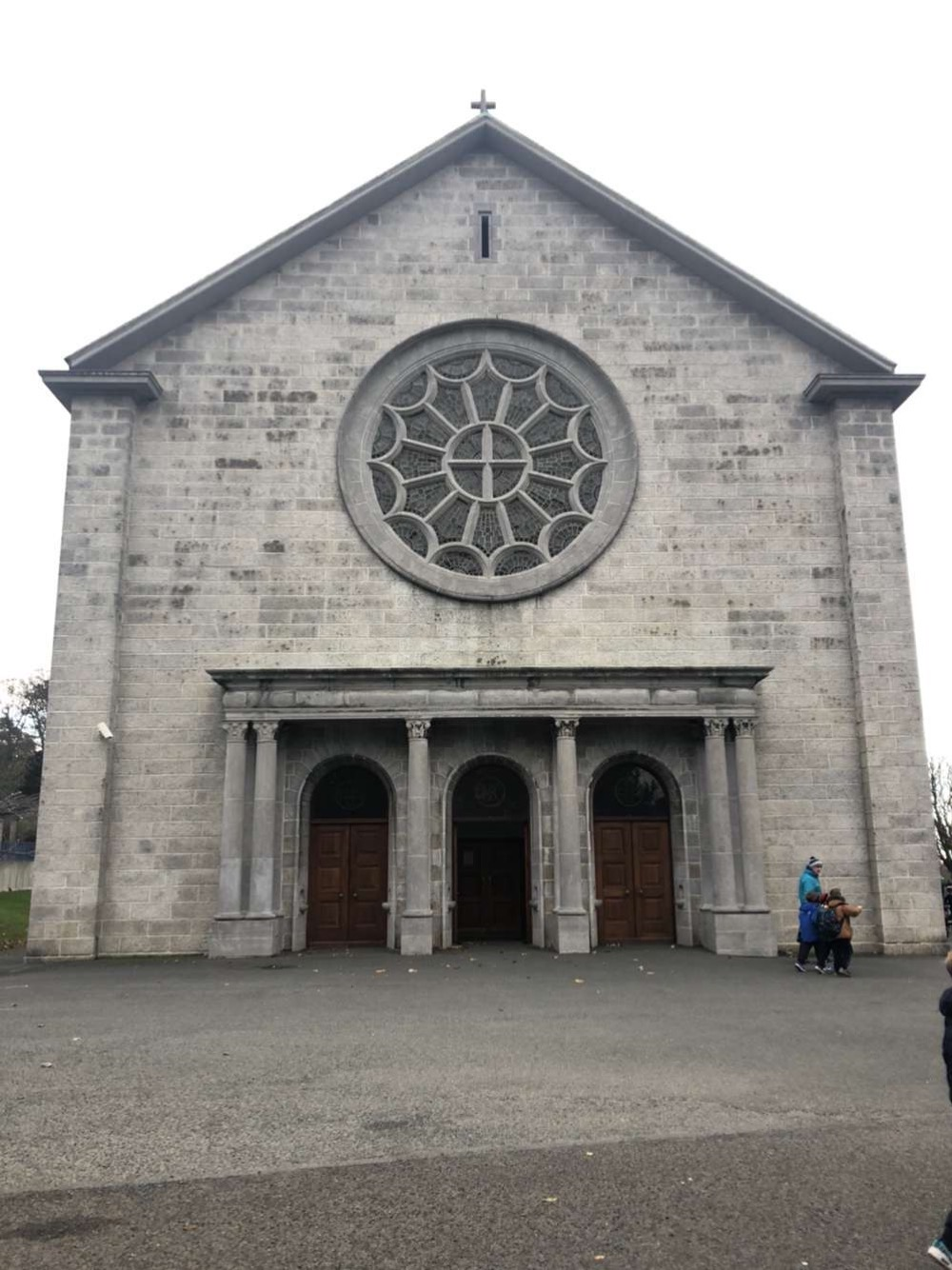
Church of St. Therésè, Mount Merrion, Dublin

In 2001, Lynam was awarded an honorary degree from Trinity College Dublin in acknowledgment of his volunteer work and remarkable achievements. Lynam celebrated his 80th birthday by climbing the Paradise Lost route in Dalkey Quarry, and for his 82nd birthday he abseiled down Winder's Slab in Dalkey Quarry. Both events were to raise funds for cancer research, as Lynam had been undergoing chemotherapy for Hodgkin's Disease. As a result of a short illness, he died on 9 January 2011, aged 86. Lynam's funeral was held in the Church of St. Therésè, Mount Merrion, Dublin.

Tributes to him included by Éamon Ó Cuív, who was the former Minister for Community, Rural and Gaeltacht Affairs, named Lynam the ‘Laoch ar lár’ which translates to ‘fallen hero’. His daughters donated his papers to his alma mater, Trinity College Dublin. The collection contains photos and slides that Lynam took of landscapes and mountaineering, and consists of maps that were collected by Lynam and his father.

Lynam's ashes were scattered over Knocknarea Mountain, Sligo on the 12 February 2011, being the first mountain he climbed. The Lynam Lecture was inaugurated in 2011 by Mountaineering Ireland, to commemorate him and his achievements. Every December the Lynam Lecture is delivered by leading national and international mountaineers and discusses the development and future of mountaineering in Ireland. Past speakers include Clare Sheridan, Frank Nugent and Paddy O'Leary.

== Legacy ==
Irish climber and chair of the Irish Upland Forum, Frank Nugent, referred to Joss Lynam as "one of the most significant people in Irish mountaineering" and that Lynam was also "... one of the few Irish climbers to be known internationally". He was a founding member of the Irish Mountaineering Club in 1948. Lynam had a significant impact on mountaineering through this club with Bill Perrot as he ensured the club was of a mixed group and allowed for anyone to join, which was somewhat unorthodox at this time as many English and international clubs were male only.

Lynam played a key role in the development for adventure sports in Ireland, and was a chairperson of the Association for Adventure Sports. Lynam was also the initiator in helping create the network of waymarked trails across Ireland, being chair of the National Waymarked Ways Advisory Committee (1984–2007), which extended over 2,000 miles on more than 30 routes.

Lynam's involvement continued throughout various committees and organisations, as well as clubs, where he participated in Cospóir, the national Sports council (1974–1984). In 1990s, Lynam was president of the Union Internationale des Associations d’Alpinisme's (UIAA) expeditions commission. Within this role he allowed for countries such as Pakistan, India, and Nepal in mountaineering “space” after years of being overlooked and also represented Ireland in a special council meeting within the union.

Dawson Stelfox, the first Irishman to conquer Everest described him as "The voice of Irish mountaineering on the international stage".

Lynam's books includeIrish Peaks (1982), and Leisure Walks Near Dublin (2004). His legacy includes handwritten and edited books, one especially being Best Irish Walks, which was first published in 1994, and known as the most useful guide available. He collaborated with cartographers Justin May and Tim Robinson to create the hillwalking guide The mountains of Connemara (1988). Lynam also edited Irish Mountain Log for over 25 years and later made some contributions to the journal.

Lynam's name is seen as historic in mountaineering as his name and list of peaks are preserved in an authoritative list of Irish summits over 600 m, and are known as Vandeleur-Lynams because of Lynam's issue of the first version of Irish mountains over 2,000 feet in 1952. His legacy continues with quotes in many publications, such as the author of A guide to Ireland’s mountain summits, regarding Lynam as a "...major authority in Irish hillwalking and his views will continue to be important for many years", published in 2013.
