= Chomolhari Kang =

Mountain in Bhutan

- Location within Bhutan Location within China

Highest point
- Elevation: 7,046 m (23,117 ft)
- Prominence: 1,369 m (4,491 ft)
- Coordinates: 28°09′52.86″N 90°10′57.01″E

Geography
- Countries: Bhutan and China
- Parent range: Himalayas

Climbing
- First ascent: 2013 by Zhou Peng and Li Shuang

Chomolhari Kang (Chinese: 卓木拉日康峰; pinyin: Zhuōmùlārì kāng fēng) is a 7,046-metre (23,117 ft) mountain in the Himalayas in Gasa District, Bhutan near the border with Tibet, China. Quotes on its height vary from 7034m to 7121m, but 7046m is the most common figure. A Chinese party who first climbed the mountain in 2013 reported a GPS height of 7,054m.

The term Chomo means "goddess" or "lady" in Tibetan.

== Location ==
Sources often characterize the mountain as being on the border between China and Bhutan.

== History ==
Chomolhari Kang was first climbed in 2013 by a Chinese crew consisting of Zhou Peng and Li Shuang. There exists no prior record of climbing.

In 2016, the Mountaineering Association of Peking University (MAPKU) made an attempt that ended at an altitude of 6600m.

== See also ==
- Mountains of Bhutan
- Chomo Lonzo
- Chomo Yummo
- Chomolungma
- Chomo Lhari
