= Kangla Tarbo 1 =

Mountain in the Himalayas

Kangla Tarbo I
- Location within Himachal Pradesh

Highest point
- Elevation: 6,315 m (20,719 ft)
- Coordinates: 32°08′N 77°50′E

Geography
- Location: Himachal Pradesh, India
- Parent range: Himalayas

Climbing
- First ascent: 9 September 2000 by Brian Geraghty, Colm Owens and Hubert Reynolds

Kangla Tarbo 1 (height 6315 m) is a mountain in the Himalayas, in the Lahaul and Spiti district of Himachal Pradesh, India.

It was first climbed in 2000 by an expedition from the Irish Mountaineering Club.
