= Doug Robinson (climber) =

American rock climber

Doug Robinson (b. 1945) is an American rock climber, climbing author and mountain guide. He has been called the father of clean climbing in Yosemite. Clean climbing was about encouraging aid climbers to stop using fixed climbing equipment, such as pitons and other hammered-in mechanical gear, and to instead switch to using temporary equipment, which can be removed and causes less damage to the rock surface.

In 1972, he was featured in a National Geographic article about his climb of Half Dome without using pitons, which brought great awareness to the success of clean climbing and catalyzed a rapid change of attitude in the climbing community against pitons. The philosophy was shared in the 1972 Chouinard Equipment catalog. It was also advocated in the catalog from company owners Yvon Chouinard and Tom Frost. Notable because at the time pitons were their best selling product.

Robinson grew up in Los Altos Hills, California. After high school he lived with John Fischer in tents on ranch land and attended Foothill College where he obtained an English degree. He later taught there with courses in guiding, climbing, and mountaineering.

Robinson was elected the first President of the American Mountain Guides Association.
