= Mountaineering Ireland =

Hillwalking organization

- Formation: 1971
- Headquarters: Irish Sport HQ
- Location: Blanchardstown, Dublin, Ireland
- Coordinates: 53.39630621°N 6.3569524°W
- Region served: island of Ireland
- Fields: mountaineering, hillwalking, climbing, bouldering
- Members: 14,000 (2020)
- Secretary General: Murrough McDonagh
- Chief Executive Officer: Paul Barron
- Chairperson: President
- Affiliations: International Climbing and Mountaineering Federation, Olympic Council of Ireland
- Funding: Irish Sports Council
- Staff: 10 (2019)
- Formerly called: Federation of Mountaineering Clubs of Ireland (1971–1990); Mountaineering Council of Ireland (1990–2009)

Mountaineering Ireland is the representative association for hikers and mountaineers on the island of Ireland. It is recognized by both Sport Ireland, the Irish authority for sport, and Sport Northern Ireland, the corresponding authority of the Government of Northern Ireland, thus operating across the island of Ireland. The association has been an International Climbing and Mountaineering Federation (UIAA) member since 2004, as well as a member of other federations. The association is also a publisher of walking and climbing guides.

== History ==
The association was founded in 1971 as the "Federation of Mountaineering Clubs of Ireland" (FMCI), by eight clubs with 300 members at the time. In 1990 it became the "Mountaineering Council of Ireland" (MCI). The current name was adopted in 2009.

Mountaineering Ireland became a member of the Olympic Council of Ireland (OCI) in June 2018, with Sport climbing set to become an Olympic sport at the 2020 Tokyo Olympics in 2021. Under the Good Friday Agreement, climbers from Northern Ireland are free to compete for Ireland, Northern Ireland or Team GB.

== Activities ==
In its work, the association concentrates on achieving and maintaining continuous access for everyone to the mountains and cliffs of Ireland and on building and maintaining the appropriate network of paths for this purpose. It also promotes and regulates the responsible use of hills and mountains in order to preserve them.

It works in the fields of mountain hiking, mountaineering, rock climbing, indoor climbing and bouldering. The MCI also runs competitions in the areas of indoor climbing and bouldering.

The association itself runs training courses for mountaineers, climbers and mountain guides and also awards its members grants for external courses. The training is carried out by Mountain Training Board Ireland (MTBI), the training committee of Mountaineering Ireland. Together with the relevant organisations for the other parts of the Islands of the North Atlantic, MTBI is a full member of Mountain Training UK and Ireland, a coordination body with the aim of a uniform training standard in the UK and Ireland.

Mountain Guide training for activities outside the British Isles is only available through Mountain Training UK and Ireland. The representation of such mountain guides in relation to the Union of International Mountain Leader Associations is carried out uniformly by the British Association of International Mountain Leaders.

Mountaineering Ireland provides information and maps of all of Ireland's mountains and hills through the MountainViews.ie website. There, members have the opportunity to add their own reports on their expeditions.

== Youth Funding ==
In order to encourage young people to climb indoors, the association works with the Association of British Climbing Walls Training Trust and supports the programs and training courses developed by them. At the same time, there is a separate program (Climbing Development Squad) to promote young climbers in general. There is also dedicated program (Climbing Development Squad) to support young climbers in general.

It also organises two weekend workshops for young mountaineers up to the age of 24 every year. Together with youth organisations, it runs programs with young people from economically or socially disadvantaged communities in climbing gyms, each lasting eight weeks.

== Memberships and Partnerships ==
Mountaineering Ireland is a member of the following organisations:

- UIAA member since 2004
- International Federation of Sport Climbing (IFSC)
- European Ramblers' Association
- Federation of Irish Sport
- Northern Ireland Environment link
- Northern Ireland Sports Forum
- The body has a working relationship with the British Mountaineering Council and Mountaineering Scotland.
- The body maintains a memorandum of understanding with Scouting Ireland for the assessment of SI's hillwalking adventure skill
