= Union of International Mountain Leader Associations =

Mountain guide association

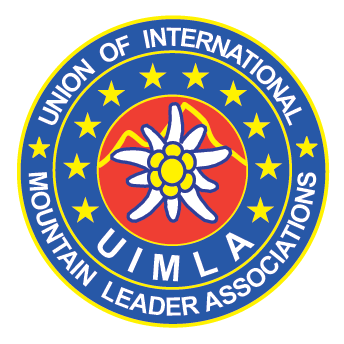
UIMLA Logo

The Union of International Mountain Leader Associations (UIMLA) was founded in November 2004. It was decided at the meeting that all mountain leader associations would be awarded the same carnet and badge giving an internationally recognised identity. It also paves the way for other countries from around the world to join UIMLA setting a world standard for mountain leaders. The principal aims of UIMLA are:

- To promote the profession of International Mountain Leader (IML) and to reinforce its identity beyond Europe;
- To develop relationships between the professionals of various nationalities and to take part in the evolution of the IML training and qualifications;
- To represent the profession at a European and international level.

The UIMLA International Mountain Leader and the IFMGA Mountain Guide are the only internationally recognised qualifications for those leading groups in the mountains.

The International Mountain Leader Award is the professional qualification for individuals who wish to lead trekking parties to all mountain areas, summer and winter, where the techniques or equipment of alpinism are not required. On successful completion of the full training and assessment programme, and by belonging to their recognised National Body, the individual will gain the full IML Award, a professional Carnet and Internationally recognised badge, giving them comparability with other IMLs worldwide.

UIMLA is a member of the International Climbing and Mountaineering Federation (UIAA) and the International Commission for Alpine Rescue

UIMLA is officially based in Switzerland in the commune of Villars-sur-Ollon in the canton of the Vaud.

== See also ==
- BAIML
- British Association of Mountain Guides
- IFMGA

== Member associations ==
- Andorra: L´Associació de Guies i Acompanyants de Muntanya d´Andorra (AGAMA)
- Argentina: Asociación Argentina de Guías de Montaña
- Austria: Verband der Österreichischen Berg- und Skiführer
- Belgium: Union Professionnelle des Métiers de la Montagne (UPMM)
- Bulgaria: Mountains & people association
- Chile Asociación Chilena de Guías/Instructores de Montaña y Escalada A.G. (ACGM)
- Croatia: Savez gorskih vodiča Hrvatske
- Czech Republic: Czech mountain leader association (CZIML)
- France: Syndicat National des Accompagnateurs en Montagne (LESAEM)
- Germany: Verband Deutscher Berg.- u. Skiführer (VDBS)
- Hungary Magyar Hegyivezetők és Hegyi Túravezetők Egyesülete (MHVE)
- Italy: Associazione Italiana Mountain Leaders (AIML)
- Japan: Japan Mountain Guides Association
- Netherlands: Nederlandse Associatie van International Mountain Leaders (NLAIML)
- Norway Norsk Naturguideforbund (NNGF)
- Peru: Asociación de Guías Oficiales de Caminata del Perú
- Poland: Stowarzyszenie Międzynarodowych Przewodników Górskich "LIDER’ (SMPG)
- Republic of North Macedonia - Macedonian Association of International Mountain Guides
- Romania: Societatea Ghizilor Liberilor Montani
- Slovenia - Združenje planinskih vodnikov Slovenije
- Slovakia - Slovenská asociácia horských sprievodcov
- Spain: Asociación Española de Guías de Montaña (AEGM)
- Sweden Svenska Fjälledarorganisationen (SFLO)
- Switzerland: Association Suisse des Accompagnateurs en Montagne (ASAM)
- United Kingdom: British Association of International Mountain Leaders (BAIML)
