= Ramabang =

Mountain in India

Highest point
- Elevation: 6,135 m (20,128 ft)

Naming
- English translation: Place of Rama
- Language of name: Hindu

Geography
- Location: Himachal Pradesh, India
- Parent range: Himalayas

Climbing
- First ascent: 22 June 2008 by Gerry Galligan, Paul Mitchell, and Darach Ó Murchú
- Easiest route: South-west ridge (AD)

Ramabang is a 6,135-metre (20,128 ft) mountain in the Himalayas, in the Lahaul and Spiti district of Himachal Pradesh, India.

It was first climbed and named in June 2008 by a team of Irish climbers, members of the Irish Mountaineering Club. The first-ascent route was via the south-west ridge, about AD grade.
