= Association of Canadian Mountain Guides =

These initials may also mean the American College of Medical Genetics.

The Association of Canadian Mountain Guides (ACMG) is Canada's only internationally recognised mountain guide association. The association has over 1400 members, and coordinates internationally recognised training and certification programmes.

The ACMG is a registered non-profit society with an elected, volunteer executive. The association and its activities are funded primarily by membership dues and donations.

In addition to training and certifying mountain guides, the ACMG has begun undertaking reviews after "critical incidents", such as fatalities or significant injuries to guides or their clients, and implementing a restorative justice approach to such events.

== History ==
The ACMG was formed in 1963 with the encouragement of Parks Canada. In 1972, the ACMG became the first non European member of the International Federation of Mountain Guides Associations (IFMGA), the international body that sets professional standards for mountain guides worldwide.
