= Mountaineering Association of Peking University =

Established im 1989

Logo of MAPKU. It is an ambiguous image of a snow-capped peak and an eagle, against a red background.

Mountaineering Association of Peking University (MAPKU) (Chinese: 北大山鹰社, lit. 'Peking University Mountain-Eagle Club') is a student's club at Peking University for mountaineering, hiking, Rock climbing, and other mountain sports. It was founded on April 1, 1989, and is the first student's club for such sports in China. It is recognised for its pioneering role in non-professional mountain sports engagement in China.

Regular activities of MAPKU include trainings on campus, weekly open climbing hours, weekend hiking, and so on. Each winter, MAPKU organises a 'winter training' for mountaineering skills on snow-and-ice terrain. Each summer, it organises a mountaineering team and a research-field trip team. It also hosts yearly national inter-university outdoor skill contests.

MAPKU organised its first high-altitude mountain expedition to Yuzhu Peak in 1990, with nine team members summiting the peak. As of 2026, the club has organised mountaineering teams to at least 37 different mountains. The mountaineering teams have made the first ascent of some peaks (e.g., Jiagang Peak, first ascent in official record) and the first ascent of Chinese people of some peaks (e.g., Nyenchen Tanglha Peak II, Kungur Peak V or 'Sarijiakaqi'). In 2018, the year of the 120th anniversary of Peking University, a team summited Mount Everest, the highest peak of earth. Besides mountaineering, MAPKU is also known for climbing and other outdoor sports. Its climbing team has won prizes in national competitions both in its early years and up until this day (2026 as of writing). It founded a ski mountaineering team in 2025, the first non-professional university student's ski mountaineering team in China, and has won national competitions.

There has been two fatal accidents in MAPKU's mountaineering history. In 1999, Zhou Huixia of the female mountaineering team to Xuebaoding died of falling on the summit attempt. In 2002, five members of the mountaineering team to Shishapangma West Peak, Lin Liqing, Lei Yu, Yang Lei, Lu Zhen, Zhang Xingbai, died in an avalanche.
