= Chomo Yummo =

Mountain in Himalayas

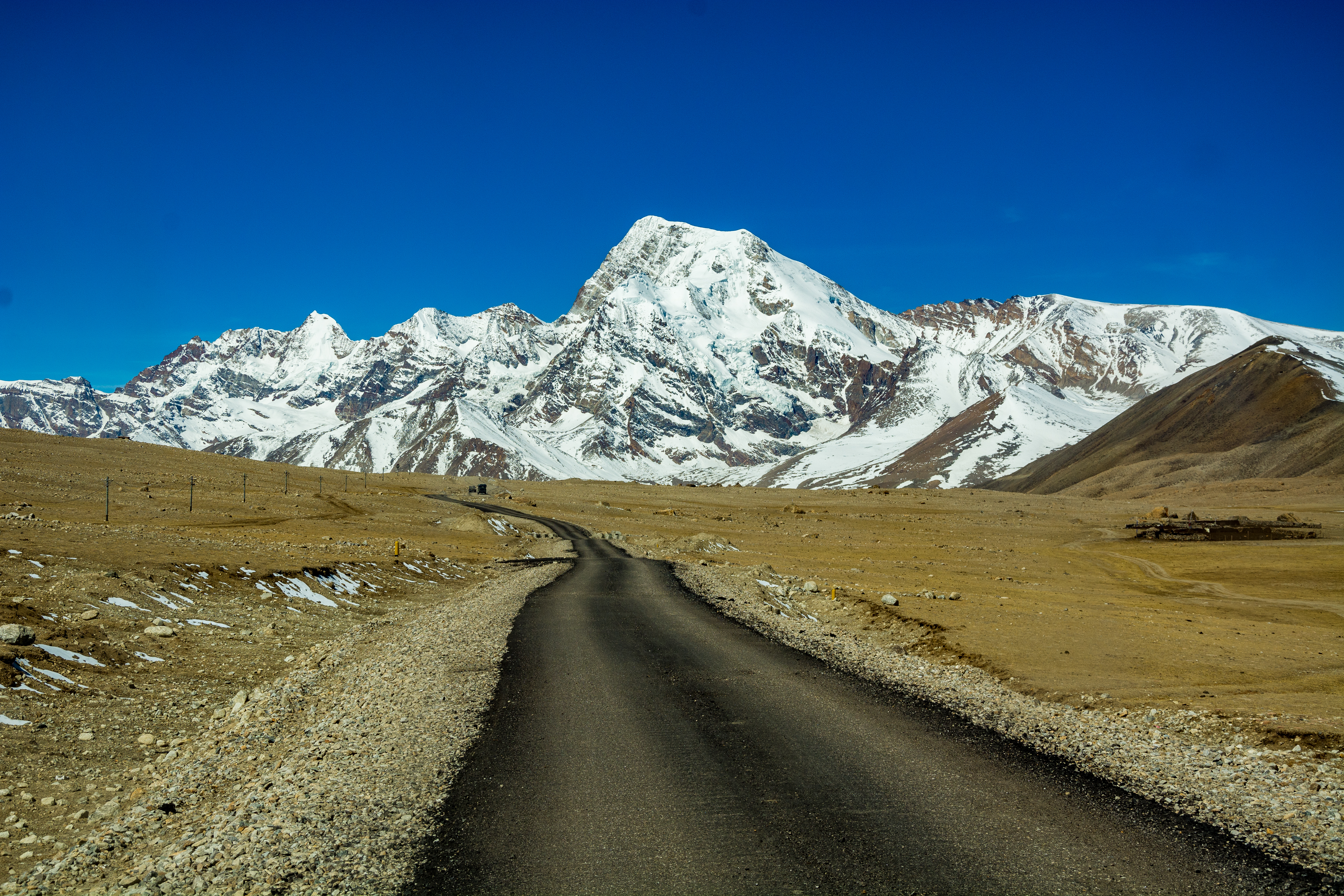
- Chomo Yummo from near Gurudongmar Lake

Highest point
- Elevation: 6,829 m (22,405 ft)
- Prominence: 1,557 m (5,108 ft)
- Coordinates: 28°2′1″N 88°32′42″E

Geography
- Location within Sikkim Location within India Location within Tibet
- Location: Sikkim, India; Tibet, China
- Parent range: Himalayas

Climbing
- First ascent: 1911

Chomo Yummo (Chinese: 卓木玉莫峰; pinyin: Zhuōmù yùmò fēng) is a 6,829-metre (22,405 ft) mountain in the Himalayas on the border between Sikkim in India and Tibet in China.

The term Chomo means "goddess" or "lady" in Tibetan.

== History ==
Chomo Yummo was first climbed in 1911 by the Scottish alpinist Alexander Kellas with the help of sherpas.

== See also ==
- Chomo Lhari
- Chomo Lonzo
- Chomolungma
- Chomolhari Kang
- List of ultras of the Himalayas
