= British Association of International Mountain Leaders =

British mountaineering organisation

The British Association of International Mountain Leaders (BAIML) is a professional association for those leading in mountains both in the United Kingdom and around the world. The group represents British International Mountain Leaders (IMLs) who work in the hills and mountains of their home country, the alpine regions and further afield. Before November 2004 the recognised qualification was the European Mountain Leader Award (EML). Following the establishment of the Union of International Mountain Leader Associations (UIMLA) in November 2004, EMLs have become International Mountain Leaders (IMLs). As an Association, BAIML now has over 600 members, most of whom hold the full IML award.

== Qualifications ==
British IMLs have been assessed in the skills required for leading walking parties in mountains. The IML award is administered by Mountain Leader Training UK and is only valid when the IML is a member of a national association (such as BAIML) and holds professional indemnity insurance.

== History ==
The IML award is a professional qualification, recognised since November 2004 by UIMLA. Before 2004, the appropriate qualification was the EML (European Mountain Leader Award) recognised since 1993 by the former Commission Européenne des Accompagnateurs en Montagne (CEAM). CEAM (La Commission Européenne des Accompagnateurs en Montagne) – the European Mountain Leader Commission – agreed in 1992 upon an accepted European Standard which would provide a framework for a walking leader's qualification recognised by the signing countries (Austria, Belgium, France, Ireland, Italy, Spain, and the UK). The first EML course ran at Plas y Brenin in November 1992. 25 people attended and completed the combined training and assessment course to become the first EML Award holders. In order for the award to be recognised as a professional qualification there needed to be an Association which would provide insurance, a Code of Conduct and a variety of other membership services. Only through membership of this Association would the award be valid. The first EML holders established the British Association of European Mountain Leaders (BAEML) in 1993, with Dave Bursnall being elected first President.

== See also ==
- Association of Mountaineering Instructors
- UIMLA
