= British Mountain Guides Association =

British mountain guide organisation

The British Mountain Guides (BMG) is a national association for professionally-trained guides. It originally formed under the name British Mountain Guides Association. It has over 140 members who are accredited and qualified in the skills to teach techniques and to guide others in climbing, mountaineering and skiing. It coordinates internationally recognized training and certification programmes.

The Association is a member of the International Federation of Mountain Guides Associations (IFMGA).

== History ==
The British Mountain Guides Association was formed in 1975 as an autonomous body to develop and enhance the training, skills and reputation of the increasing number of skilled mountaineers who wished to qualify as guides and follow this profession in the world's mountains. The mountaineer Roger Payne was president of the BMG for some years until his death in 2012 on Mont Maudit.
