= Mountain guide =

Mountaineering expert who guides travellers or other mountaineers on their path

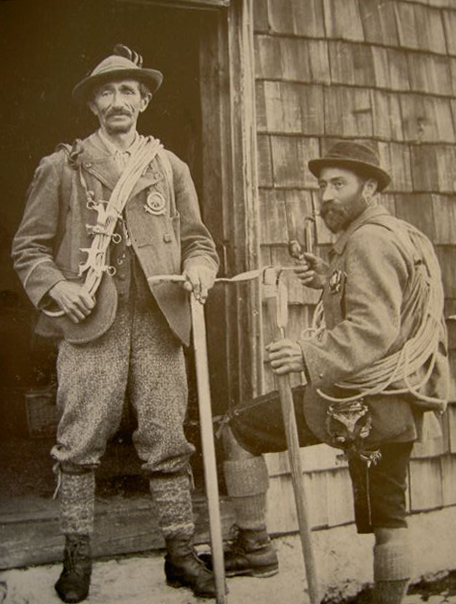
Austrian mountain guides Anselm Klotz (left) and Josef Frey (right), 19th century

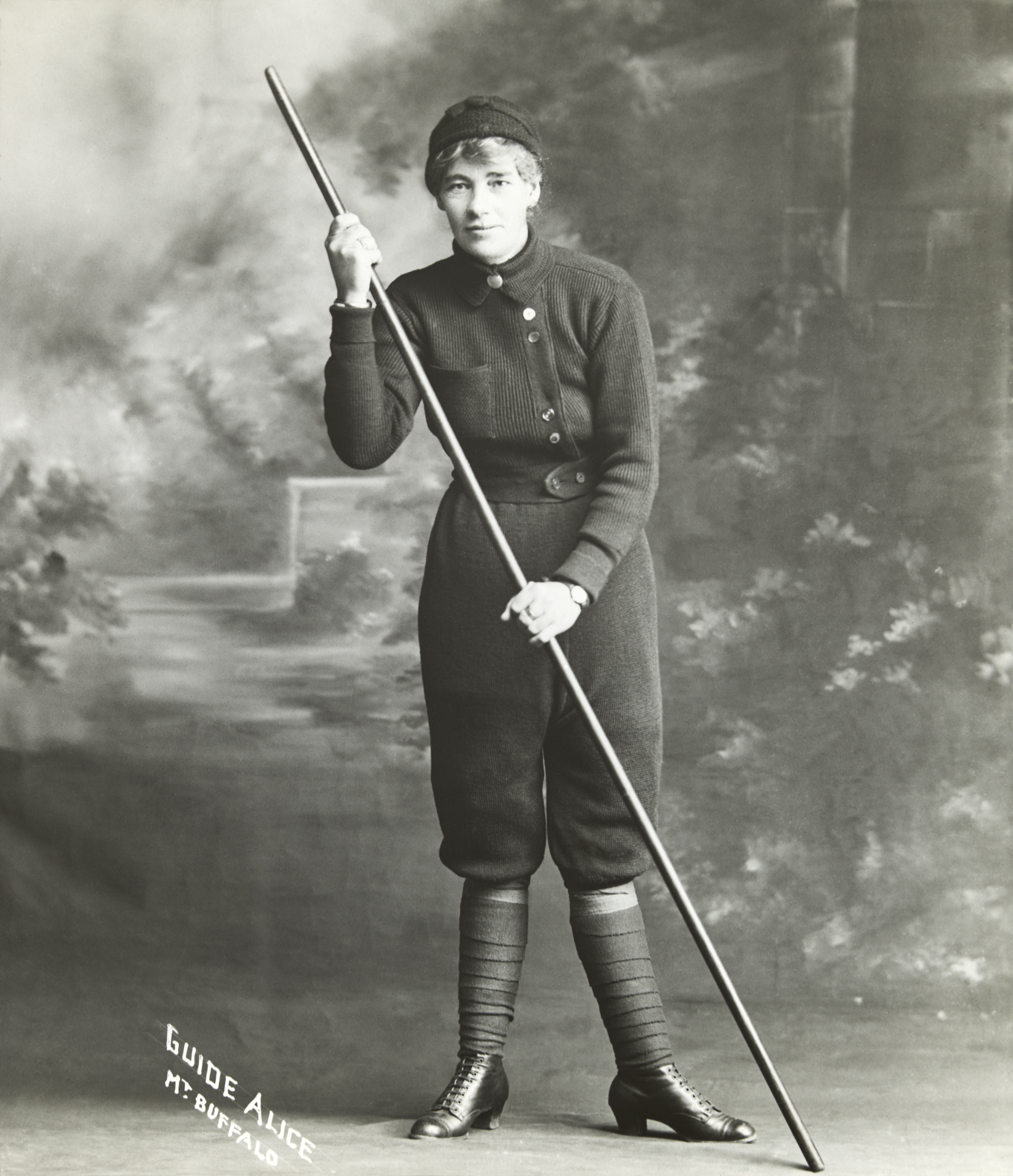
Alice Manfield, a pioneering female mountain guide in Australia in the early 1900s wearing self-designed clothing

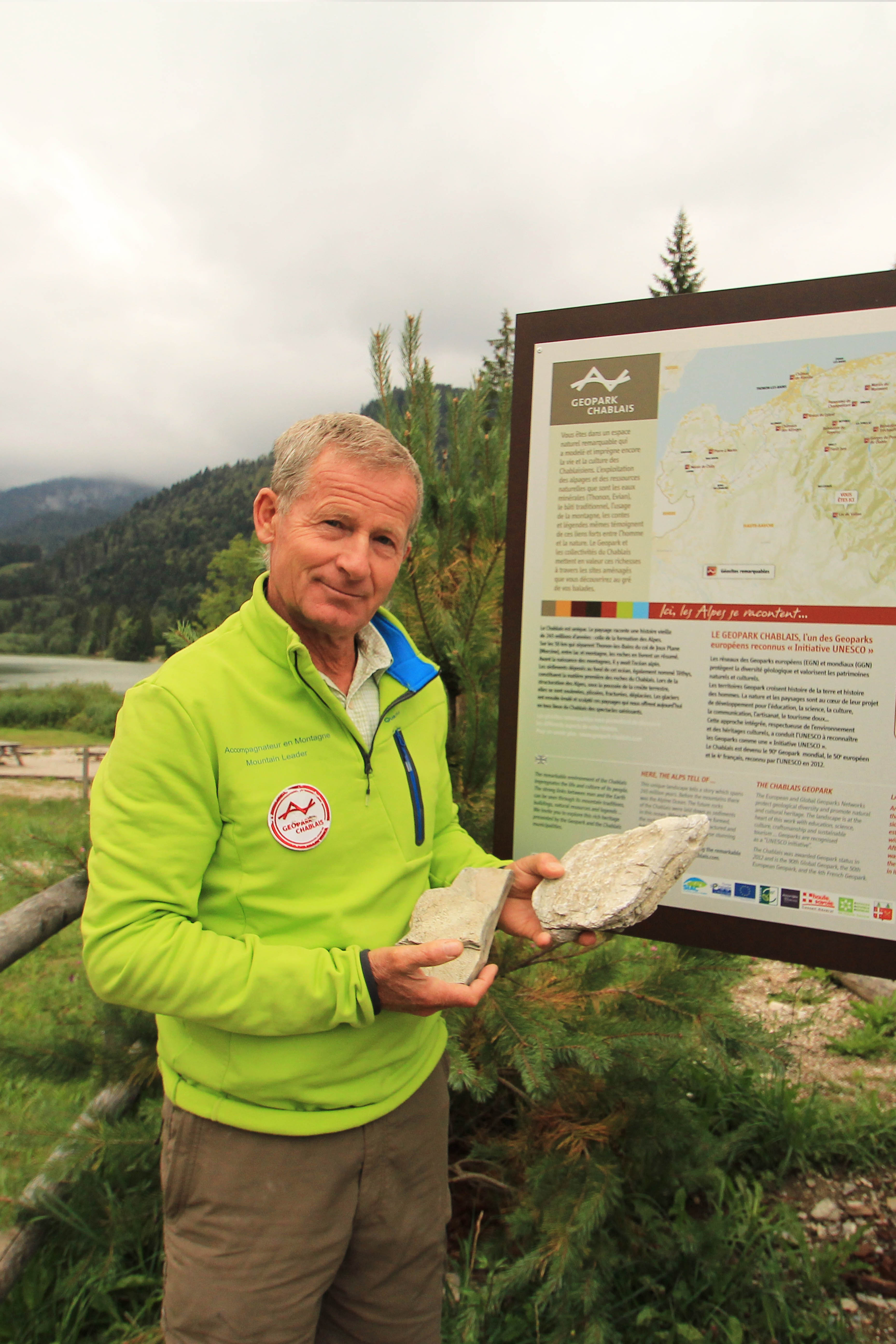
French mountain guides on the Lac de Vallon, in 2017

A mountain guide is a specially trained and experienced professional mountaineer who is certified by local authorities or mountain guide associations. They are considered to be high-level experts in mountaineering, and are hired to instruct or lead individuals or small groups who require this advanced expertise. This professional class of guides arose in the middle of the 19th century when alpine climbing became recognized as a sport.

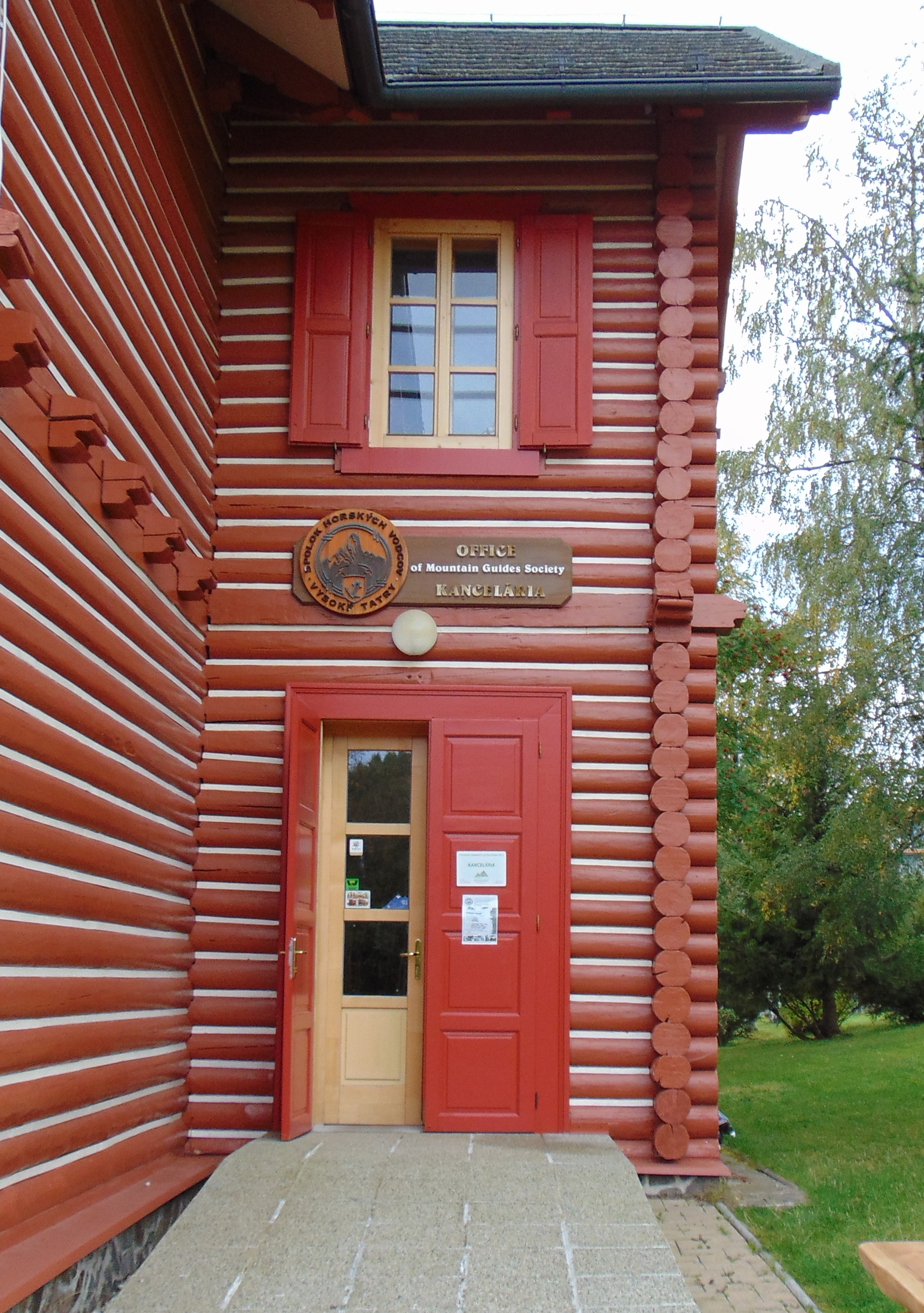
Office, Association of Mountain Guides High Tatras in Starý Smokovec

== Attributes ==
=== Skills ===
A mountain guide's skills include:

- Rock climbing
- Ice climbing
- Mountaineering
- Skiing

=== Knowledge ===
Supporting these are the theory and practice of:

- Snowcraft
- Weather appreciation and interpretation
- Navigation
- Risk assessment
- Avalanche hazards
- First aid

=== Certification in the IFMGA ===
The title of IFMGA Mountain Guide is (in most countries) reserved for individuals who have received full certification through their country's national mountain guides association of which the curriculum and training are approved by the International Federation of Mountain Guides Associations (IFMGA). Certification is earned through a rigorous examination process encompassing rock climbing, alpine climbing and ski mountaineering. Typically lasting between 3 and 7 years, mountain guide certification requires a high level of commitment, dedication and technical skill to achieve.

=== Services ===
In addition to assuring safety, professional mountain guides frequently offer other desirable services to their clients. These services can significantly improve the alpine experience, especially when the client climber has limited time or equipment, lacks a qualified partner or is visiting an unfamiliar area. These additional mountain guide services may include:

- Precise local knowledge of mountain routes, weather, snow & glacier conditions;
- Specific training in alpine skills like off-piste skiing, avalanche awareness, rock climbing, ice climbing, mountain navigation & the proper use of mountain tools like ice ax, crampons, rope, climbing anchor systems, avalanche beacons, etc.;
- The ability to contact helicopters for remote ski mountaineering access or heli-skiing;
- Preferential access to various ski lifts and trams;
- Sometimes, more immediate access to use-limited features in areas like the U.S. National Parks.

== Organizations ==
Mountain guides are commonly organized in national and international associations. The world's oldest guide association was formed in the Silesian Sudetes in 1817. It was in the Sudetes that the mountain guide Franz Pabel received probably the first ever state-confirmed license as a mountain guide. First alpine guide association was the Compagnie des Guides de Chamonix, which was established in Chamonix in 1821, which banned women until the 1980s. It remains today the largest association with nearly 250 mountain guides. The biggest international organization is the International Federation of Mountain Guides Associations, which is located in Gstaad, Switzerland.

== Military mountain guides ==
Several armed forces train mountain guides, who serve with specialist military alpine units. These include Gebirgs forces in Germany, Austria and Switzerland, with qualified guides in the German Bundeswehr wearing a special mountain guide badge.

During the First World War there were mountain guide companies in the Austro-Hungarian army. Its members were used for special tasks and particularly dangerous operations in the mountains with great success. K.u.K. Army mountain guides were, for example, Angelo Dibona, Luis Trenker and it:Sepp Innerkofler.

The birth of the training to become an Austrian army mountain guide began in 1906 when the first organization of mountain guide courses for the military came about. In 1915, experienced and enthusiastic volunteers from the Kaiserjäger regiments were put together in high mountain companies who were deployed in high alpine terrain. In December 1916, with the help of Georg Bilgeri and Mathias Zdarsky, the establishment of mountain guide companies began. Among the alpine instructors on the individual front sections were mountaineers such as Julius Kugy in the Julian Alps and Leo Handl in the Marmolada. The mountain guide companies had many tasks to perform in the mountains. They carried out the fight in extreme terrain, they were responsible for advising the troops in difficult terrain, they carried out the high-alpine reconnaissance service; organized the rescue service in the high mountains and were responsible for high-alpine pathways and protective structures. In contrast to the high mountain companies, the mountain guide companies were only exceptionally intended for a closed tactical combat mission. Georg Bilgeri's notes show that by January 22, 1918, 146 officers and 2,302 men were trained as military mountain guides. During this time, of course, many regulations and training documents were created that found international recognition and were adopted by other armies. A badge for military mountain guides was also introduced in June 1918, but was only available in small numbers.

== See also ==
- Category of famous alpine guides
- Sherpa
- Association of Canadian Mountain Guides, American Mountain Guides Association, British Association of Mountain Guides, Union of International Mountain Leader Associations, UIAGM
