= Jomolhari =

Mountain in Bhutan/China

- Chomo Lhari
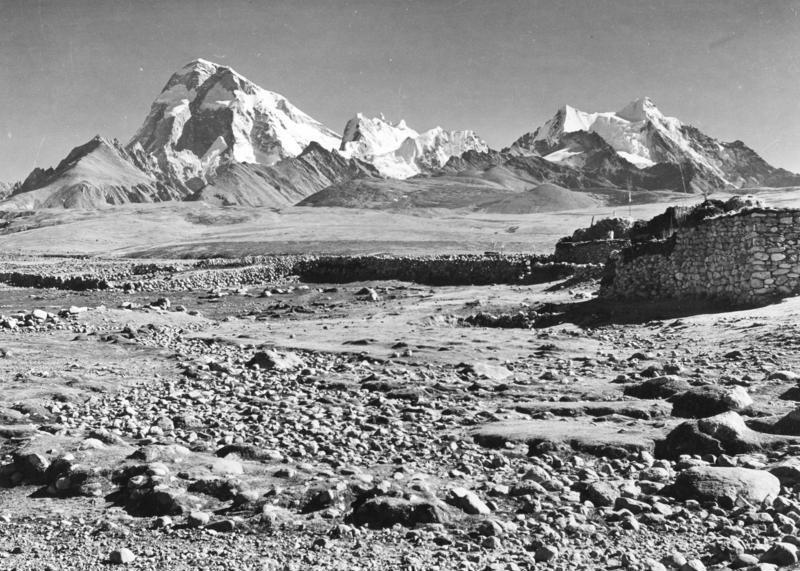
- Jomolhari seen from the southwest Picture taken in Phari, Tibet, in 1938

Highest point
- Elevation: 7,326 m (24,035 ft) (Note: Official Chinese PLA mapping); Ranked 78th
- Prominence: 2,077 m (6,814 ft)
- Listing: Ultra
- Coordinates: 27°49′27″N 89°16′12″E

Naming
- English translation: Mountain of the Goddess
- Language of name: Tibetan

Geography
- Location within Bhutan
- Location: Paro, Bhutan; Tibet Autonomous Region, China
- Parent range: Himalayas

Climbing
- First ascent: May 1937

Jomolhari or Chomolhari (Note: Also spelled Jomolari or Jumolhari) (Wylie: jo mo lha ri; sometimes known as "the bride of Kangchenjunga”, is a mountain in the Himalayas, straddling the border between Yadong County of Tibet, China and the Paro district of Bhutan. The north face rises over 2,700 metres (8,900 ft) above the barren plains. The mountain is the source of the Paro Chu (Paro river) which flows from the south side and the Amo Chu which flows from the north side.

== Religious significance ==
The mountain is sacred to Tibetan Buddhists who believe it is the abode of one of the Five Tsheringma Sisters; (jo mo tshe ring mched lnga) — female protector goddesses (Jomo) of Tibet and Bhutan, who were bound under oath by Padmasambhava to protect the land, the Buddhist faith and the local people.

On the Bhutanese side is a Jomolhari Temple, toward the south side of the mountain about a half-day's journey from the army outpost between Thangthangkha and Jangothang at an altitude of 4150 meters. Religious practitioners and pilgrims visiting Mt. Jomolhari stay at this temple. There are several other sacred sites near Jomolhari Temple, including meditation caves of Milarepa and Gyalwa Lorepa. Within an hour's walk up from the temple at an altitude of c. 4450 meters is Tseringma Lhatso, the "spirit lake" of Tsheringma.

In Tibet there is an annual pilgrimage from Pagri to a holy lake, Jomo Lharang, which lies at c. 5,100 metres (16,700 ft) elevation, just north of the mountain.

== Climbing history ==
Because Jomolhari was sacred and the home of goddesses, those living nearby believed it was impossible to climb, and that anyone who climbed too high would be thrown down.

Despite its notability and spectacular visibility from the old trade route between India and Lhasa that passes through the Chumbi Valley, the mountain has seen little climbing activity. It was known to climbers passing by on the way to Everest and was scouted by Odell as early as 1924. In 1937 a permission to climb the sacred mountain was granted to a British expedition headed by Freddie Spencer Chapman by both "the Tibetans" and the "Maharajah of Bhutan. Although no refusals are known of earlier climbing requests, Chapman believed this was the reason it had gone unclimbed until 1937. Six porters accompanied the 5 man climbing team from Phari across Sur La into Bhutan. Chapman and Pasang Dawa Lama (a Sherpa who was also part of the American K2 expedition fame) reached the summit via the southeast spur on 21 May 1937. The protracted and epic descent, which they were fortunate to survive, is described in detail in Chapman’s Helvellyn to Himalaya published in 1940.

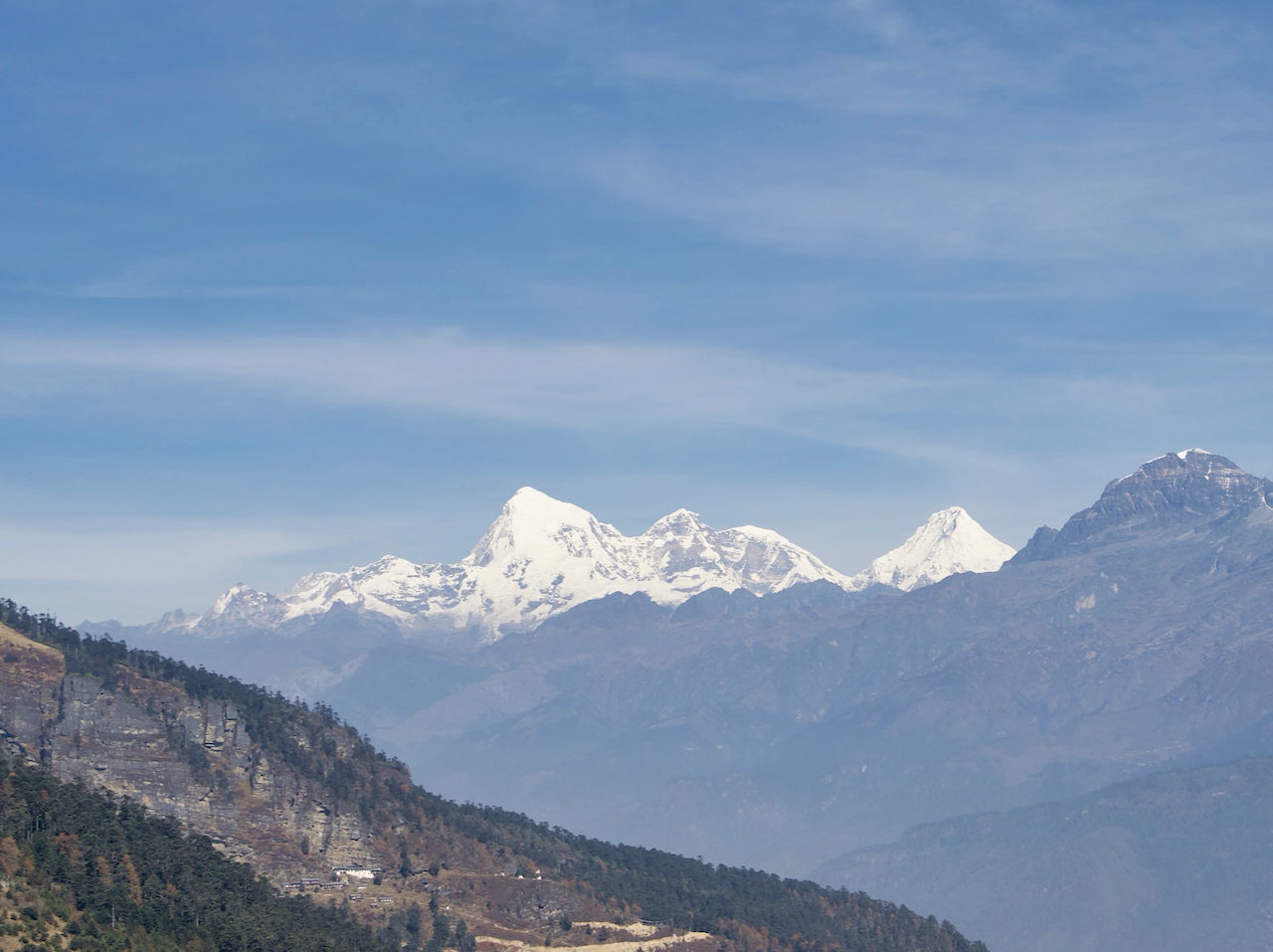
Mount Chomolhari (Jomolhari) from the road Paro - Chelela Pass, Bhutan

The second ascent was only on 24 April 1970 -over the same route- by a joint Bhutanese-Indian military expedition led by Colonel Narendra Kumar. This ascent was notable also for the disappearance of two climbing members and a sherpa in the second summit party the following day. Dorjee Lhatoo (Nanda Devi East 1975, West 1981) led the route, partnered with Prem Chand (2nd ascent Kanchenjunga 1977) all the way to the summit via two camps. Lhatoo was charged with laying a "Sachu Bumter" offering on the summit by the Bhutanese King in order to "appease" mountain deities - apparently a pot containing gold, silver and precious stones. The following day, the second party of three were spotted close to the ridge when they became obscured by cloud. When the cloud lifted, they were gone. A telephoto lens and fruit cans were found on the ridge by a search party. Prem Chand went up to the ridge and reported gunshots thudding into the ice and whipping up ice chips - thus ending any further attempts in locating the missing bodies. Lhatoo and Prem Chand, on their way up during their successful summit attempt had reported seeing a lot of PLA activity on the Lhasa-Chumbi highway. The reason for their disappearance remains speculative - did they fall or were they shot? All three were relatively inexperienced climbers and Lhatoo later speculated on the exposure on the knife-edged ridge leading to the summit slope as a possible incident site. He (an ex-Gurkha himself) is quoted as believing the shooting theory to be unlikely but possible, citing his difficulty in estimating the distance between the ridge and possible Chinese positions on the Tibetan side. An account of the expedition is available in the Himalayan Journal 2000. Prem Chand has not spoken publicly on the matter. Chinese displeasure with Bhutan over the expedition and sensitivities in New Delhi led to a complete media blackout of what was otherwise a notable Indian climb.

The third ascent was made in 1996 by a joint Japanese-Chinese expedition which reached the south col from the Tibetan side and climbed the peak over the south ridge. On 7 May 2004, British climbers Julie-Ann Clyma and Roger Payne reached the summit via the c. 5800 m south col as well, in a single day's dash from the col, after attempts to climb the impressive northwest pillar were thwarted by strong winds.

In October 2006, a six-member Slovenian team climbed two new routes, registering the fifth and sixth ascents. Rok Blagus, Tine Cuder, Samo Krmelj and Matej Kladnik took the left couloir of the north face to the East ridge at c. 7100 m, from which they followed the ridge to the top, while Marko Prezelj and Boris Lorencic climbed the northwest ridge in a six-day round trip. This climb earned Prezelj and Lorencic the Piolet d'Or in January 2007.

== See also ==
- Mountains of Bhutan
- Chomo Lonzo
- Chomo Yummo
- Chomolungma
- Chomolhari Kang
- List of ultras of the Himalayas

== Sources ==
- Chapman, F. Spencer (1940). Helvellyn to Himalaya: Including an Account of the First Ascent of Chomolhari. London: Chatto & Windus.
- Thinley, Lopon Kunzang; KMT Research Group (2008). Seeds of Faith: A Comprehensive Guide to the Sacred Places of Bhutan. Volume 1. Thimphu: KMT Publications. ISBN 978-99936-22-41-3.

== Gallery ==
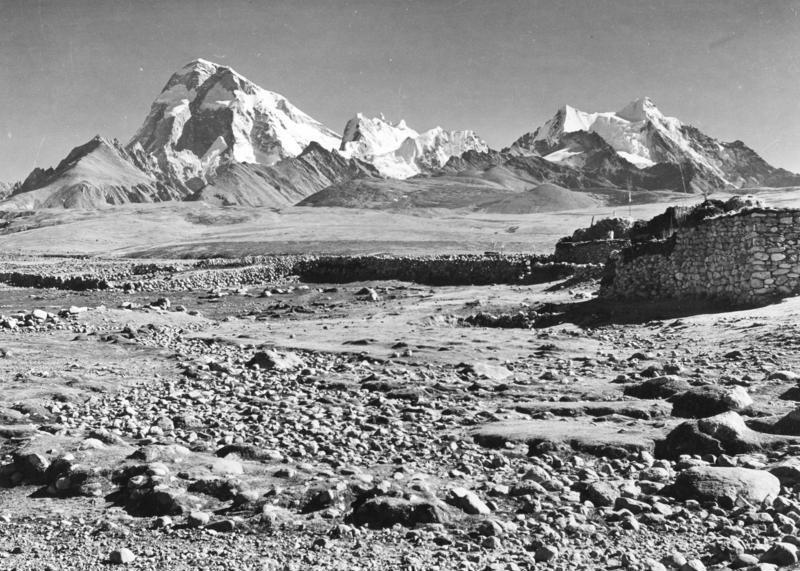

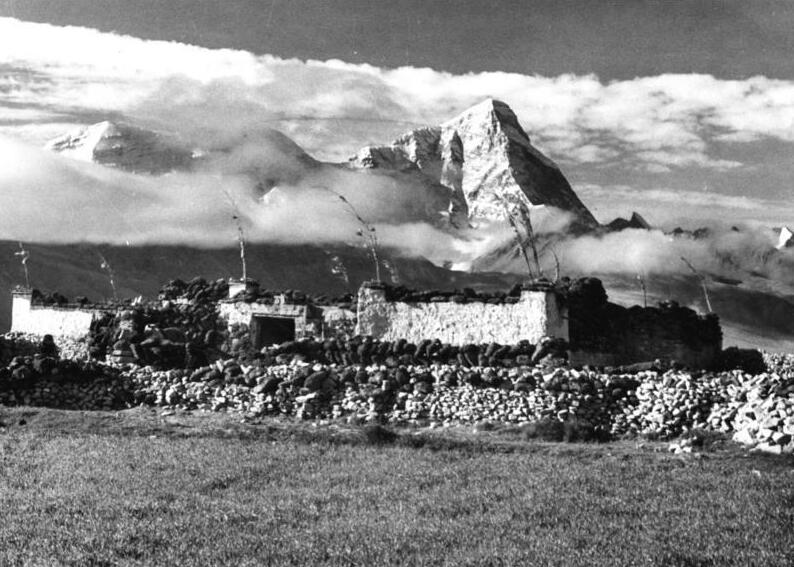

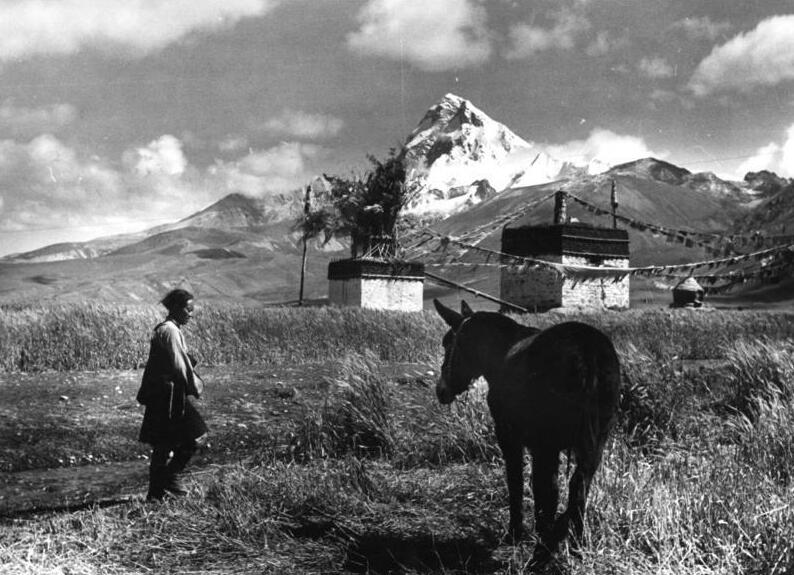

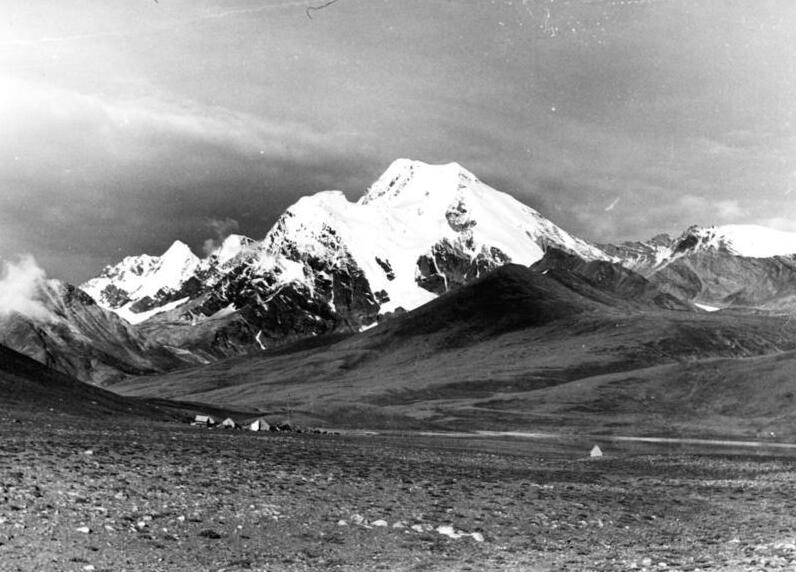

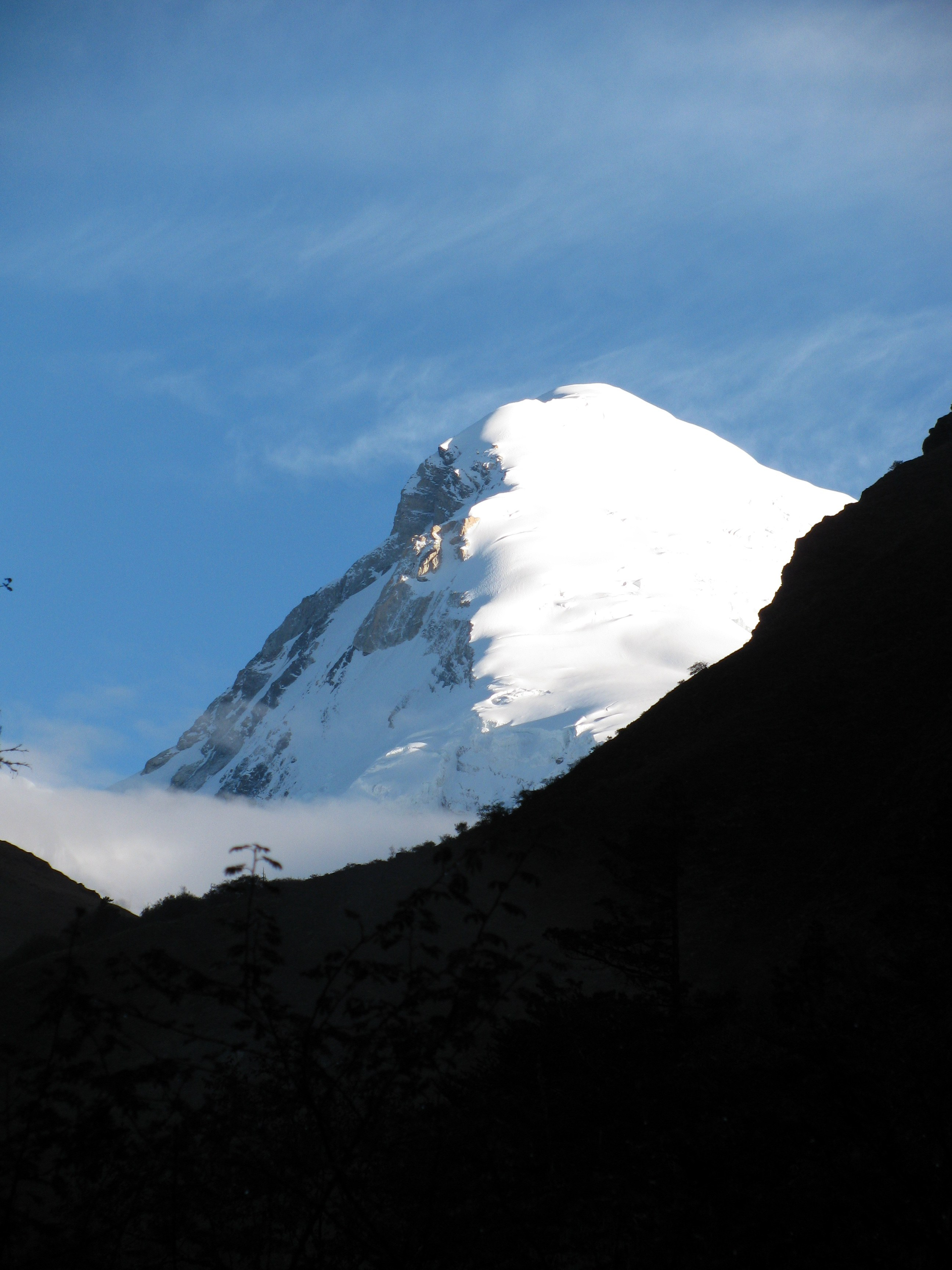
Mt. Jomolhari at dawn from Thangthangkha camp

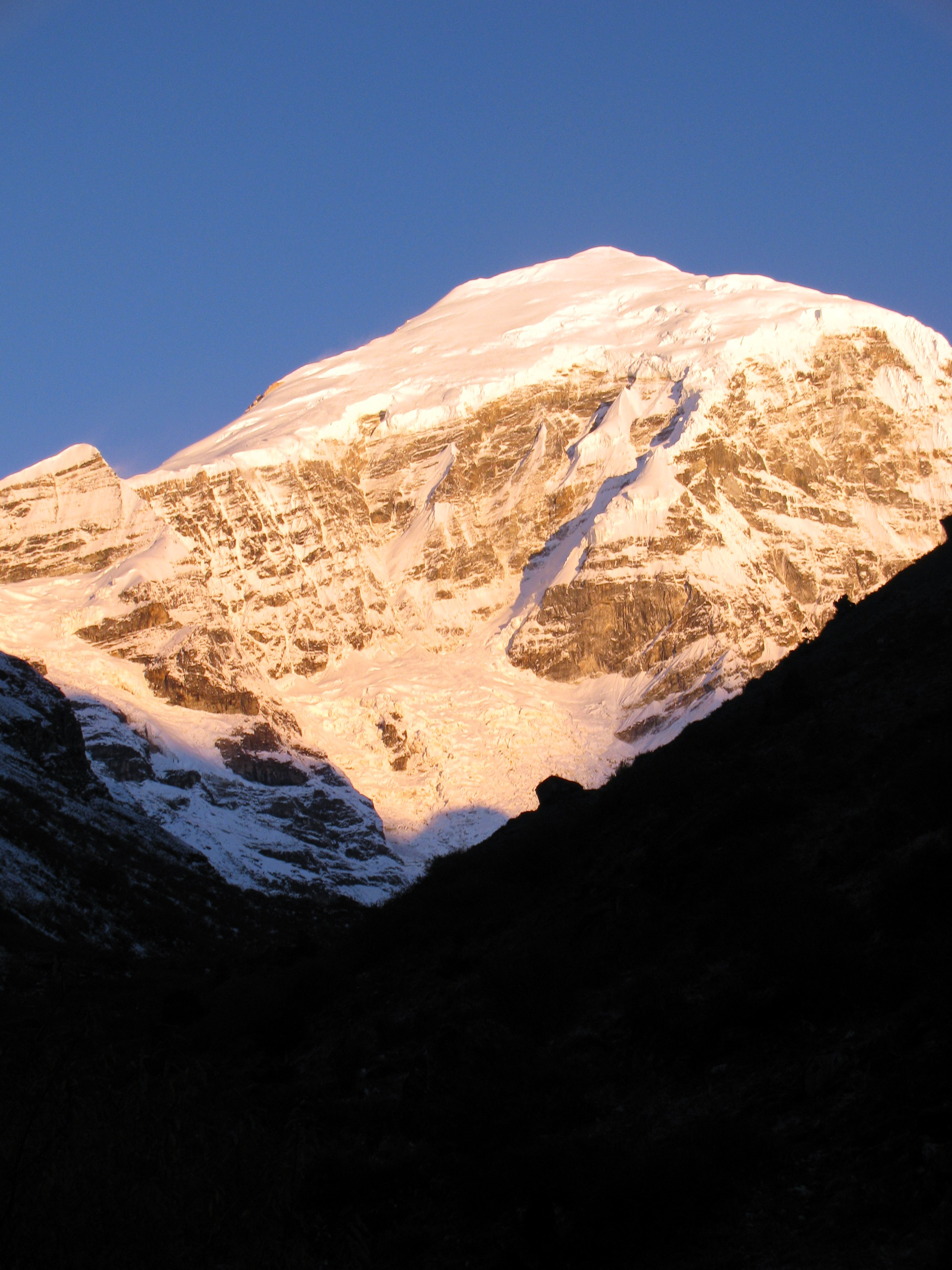
Mt. Jomolhari at dawn from Jangothang

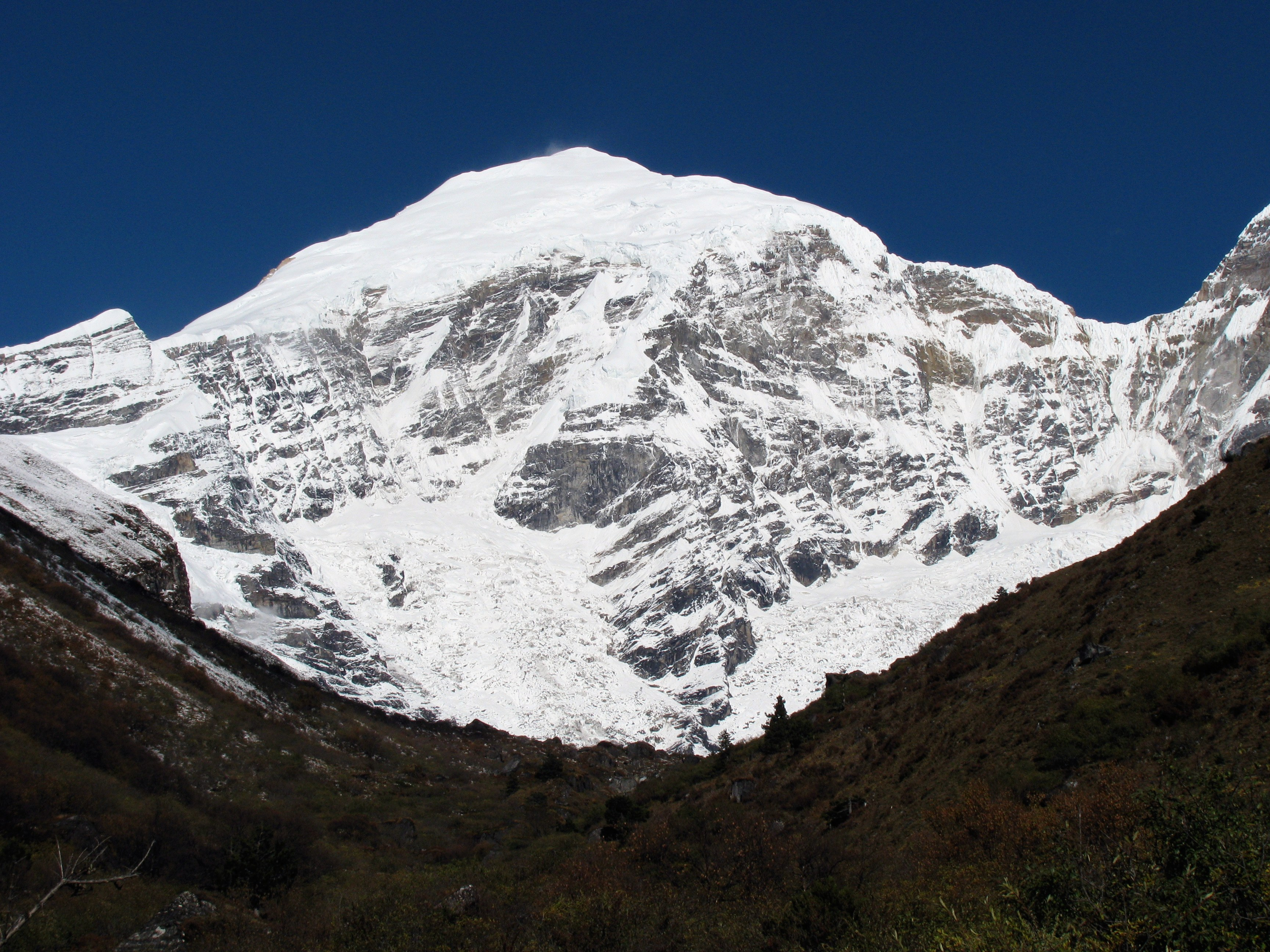
Mt. Jomolhari from Jangothang, Bhutan

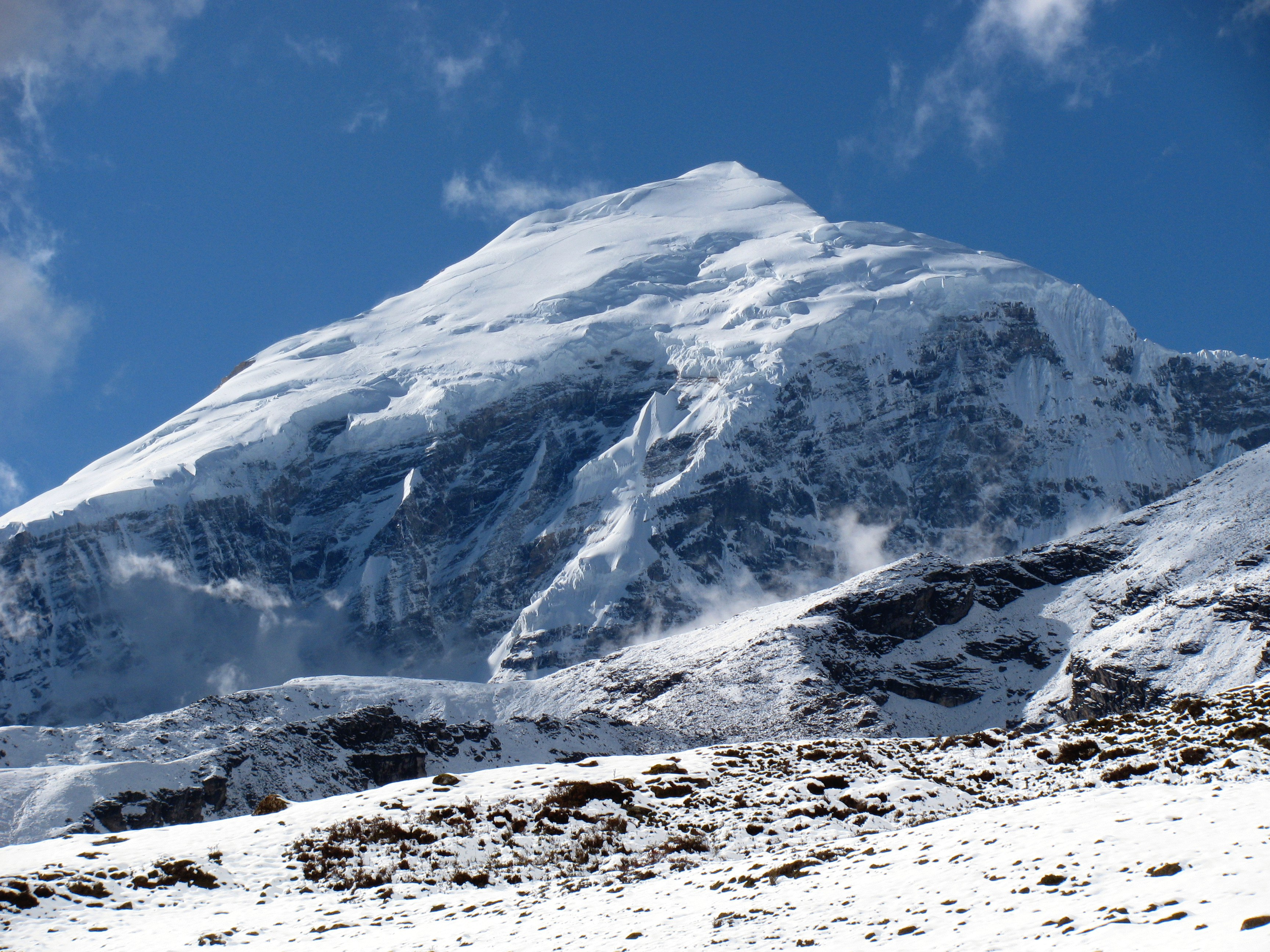
Mt Jomolhari viewed from near Neleyla pass

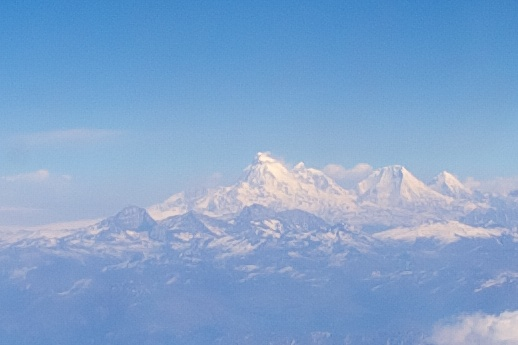
Mt Jomolhari viewed from flight Kathmandu - Paro

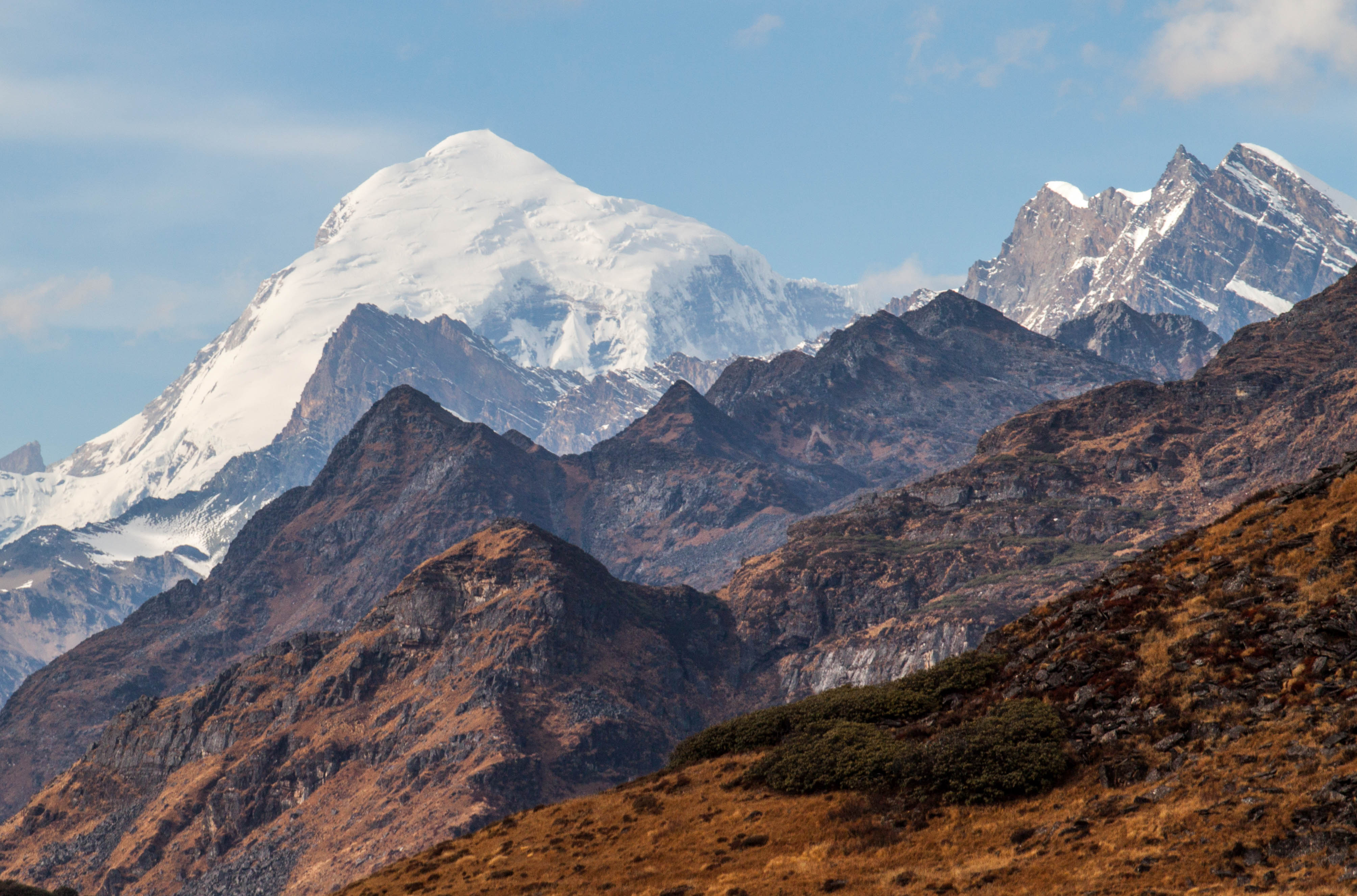
Mount Jomolhari
