= International Federation of Mountain Guides Associations =

International federation of mountain guides

UIAGM seal

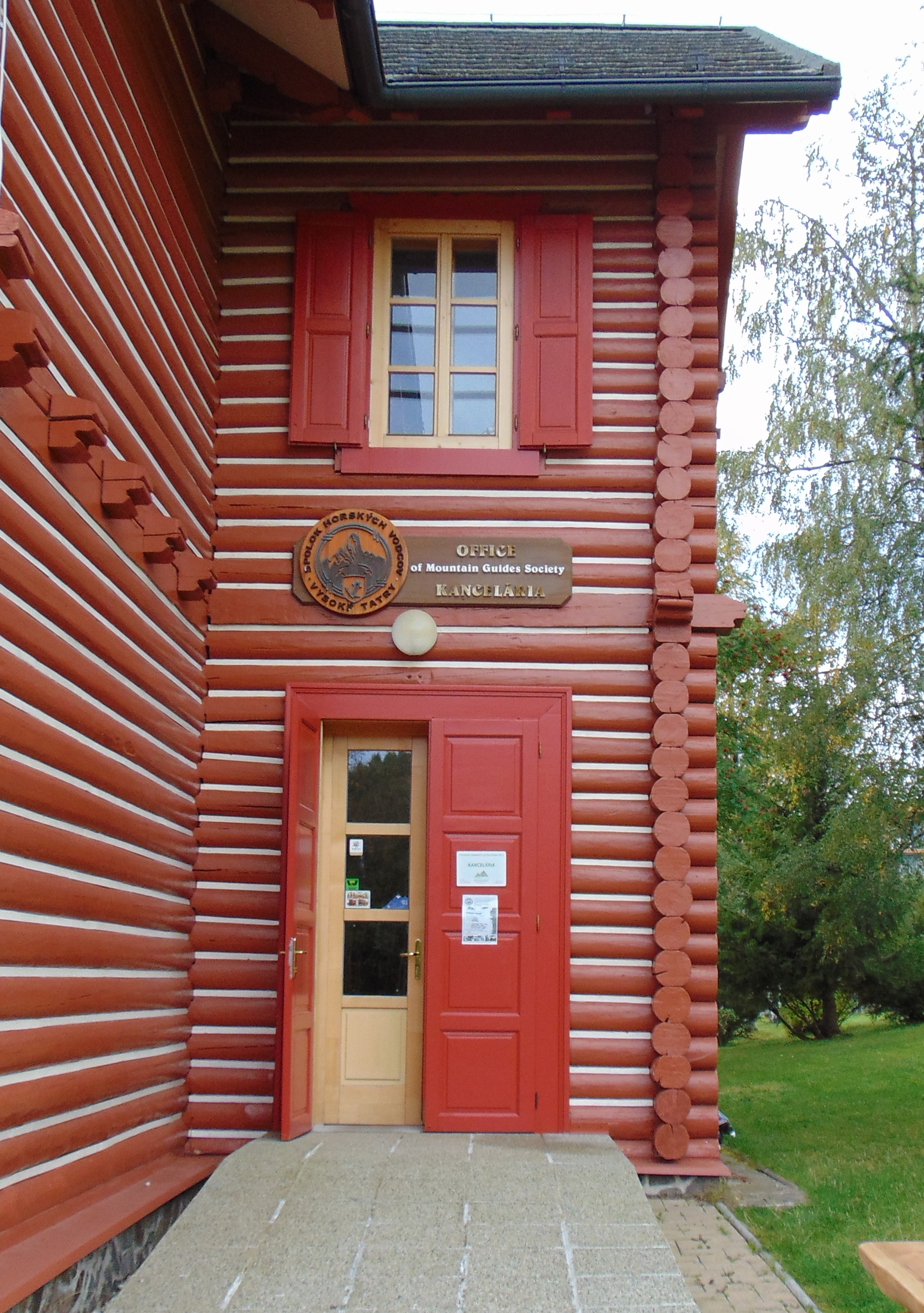
Office, Association of Mountain Guides High Tatras in Starý Smokovec (Slovakia)

The Union Internationale des Associations de Guides de Montagnes is the International Federation of Mountain Guides Associations, known alternatively by its French, German and English abbreviations: UIAGM, Union Internationale des Associations de Guides de Montagnes (French), IVBV, Internationale Vereinigung der Bergführerverbände (German), IFMGA, International Federation of Mountain Guide Associations (English).

== History ==
In 1965, in Zermatt (Switzerland) representatives of the mountain guides associations from Italy, France, Austria, and Switzerland decided to lay the foundations for an international federation of all mountain guides associations. The first statutes were in 1966.

== Activities ==
The purposes of the federation are:

- Adjustment of the laws of the mountain guides by promoting standardized professional training as possible, in order to facilitate the practice of the mountain guide occupation abroad. Among other things by issuing a common international document of identification.
- When needed to give an arbitral tribunal, that has an advisory function and serves as mediate in case of points of issue between members and third parties.
- To study problems of general and economic nature affecting the occupation of mountain guides.
- To order to arrange closer comradeship and the exchange of ideas amongst the mountain guides of all nations.
