= Middle Peak =

Middle Peak may refer to:

- Middle Peak (Colorado), in the San Miguel Mountains, United States
- Middle Peak (Nevada), United States
- Middle Peak (Washington), in the North Cascades, US

== See also ==
- Middle Triple Peak, in the Kichatna Mountains, Alaska, United States
