= Sue Fear =

Australian mountain climber (1963–2006)

Susan Erica Fear OAM
Personal information
- Nationality: Australian
- Born: 18 March 1963 St Ives, New South Wales
- Died: 28 May 2006 (aged 43) Manaslu

Climbing career
- Type of climber: Mountaineer
- Major ascents: Mount Everest
- Updated on 17 March 2013

Susan Erica Fear OAM (18 March 1963 – 28 May 2006) was an Australian mountaineer, supporter of the Fred Hollows Foundation and a 2005 recipient of the Order of Australia Medal. Her life and climbing career is illustrated in her biography Fear No Boundary: The Road to Everest and Beyond, written by Fear and fellow climber Lincoln Hall and published in 2005.

== Early life ==
Born on 18 March 1963, in St Ives, New South Wales, Australia, Fear was the middle child in her family and had two brothers, Grahame and John. Her parents were Ron and Joan Fear. Her mother, Joan, died from breast cancer in May 1988, and her father, Ron, died unexpectedly of a heart attack in June 2002.

Fear attended St Ives North Public School in her primary school years, where she was the School Captain, then Abbotsleigh (Years 7–10), where she was the softball captain, and Barker College (Years 11–12) on Sydney's north, where she was a school prefect and the captain of the girls' hockey and cricket teams. While at school, she attained the Duke of Edinburgh's Gold Award. In 2019, Fear was honoured by Barker College which, while extending their number of 'Houses' to cater for the influx of many more girls in Years 7-9, named Fear House house after her.

After finishing secondary school in 1980, Fear took an office job with Wilderness Expeditions, an adventure travel company founded by Tim Macartney-Snape. The company was later acquired by World Expeditions, and she moved out of the office and into the field. She became an adventure guide and led cross country ski trips in Australia as well as treks in Africa, South America, and Asia. She was recognised as one of the company's senior guides, leading many physically challenging mountaineering expeditions.

== Climbing career ==
Between 1995 and 2006, Fear climbed the Seven Summits and five of the fourteen eight-thousander peaks. Her first eight-thousander was Cho Oyu (8,201 m) in 1998, followed by Shishapangma (8,027 m) in 2002. In 2003, Fear climbed Everest (8,848 m) from the more difficult Tibetan side on the North Col. She was the first Australian-born woman and the second Australian woman overall to do so. She then successfully climbed Gasherbrum II (8,034 m) in Pakistan the following year (2004). Her final climb was Manaslu (8,163 m) in 2006, which she successfully summited.

Fear died on 28 May 2006, when she fell approx. on 7,400 m into a crevasse while descending from the summit of Manaslu. Her body remains on the mountain, honouring an earlier request if she were to die while climbing a mountain. A plaque now lies in the memory of her, just above the town of Bandipur, on a small hill facing Manaslu.

== Honours and awards ==
Fear was awarded the Order of Australia Medal (OAM) in 2005 for services to mountaineering and her work as Ambassador for The Fred Hollows Foundation, which will have an eye clinic named after her in Dhading Besi, Nepal. Fear was also named the 2003 Adventurer of the Year by the Australian Geographic Society. She was an ambassador for the Australian Himalayan Foundation and helped raise funds for the Australian Nepalese Medical Group.

== Climbing Achievements ==
1995 – Kilimanjaro (5,895 m)

1995 – Elbrus (5,642 m)

1996 – Kosciuszko (2,228 m)

1996 – Mont Blanc (4,810 m)

1996 – Aconcagua (6,961 m)

1997 – Denali (6,194 m)

1998 – Cho Oyu (8,201 m)

1999 – Puncak Jaya (4,884 m)

2001 – Vinson Massif (4,892 m)

2002 – Shishapangma (8,027 m)

2003 – Mount Everest (8,848 m)

2004 – K2 (8,611 m)

2005 – Nanga Parbat (8,126 m)

2006 – Manaslu (8,586 m)

== Book ==
Fear's life and climbing career is written about in the biographical book Fear No Boundary: The Road to Everest and Beyond, written by fellow climber Lincoln Hall (with Sue Fear), and first published in Melbourne by Lothian Books in 2005.
