= East Buttress =

East Buttress may refer to:

- a high point and a prominent point of Denali, Alaska
- one of the buttresses of Clogwyn Du'r Arddu, Wales
- one of the crags of Scafell, England
- a climbing route in Middle Cathedral Rock, Yosemite Valley, California
- a climbing route in Middle Triple Peak, Alaska
