= Matt Craven =

Canadian actor

- Born: Matthew John Crnkovich; November 10, 1956 (age 69); Port Colborne, Ontario, Canada
- Occupation: Actor
- Years active: 1979–present
- Spouse: Sally Sutton
- Children: 2

Matthew John Crnkovich (born November 10, 1956), known as Matt Craven, is a Canadian character actor. He has appeared in over 40 films including Happy Birthday to Me, Jacob's Ladder, K2, A Few Good Men, Crimson Tide, The Juror, Assault on Precinct 13, Disturbia, and X-Men: First Class.

Craven has also made several television appearances, most notably as Clayton Jarvis on the CBS series, NCIS, Officer Lenny Gayer on High Incident, Dr. Tim Lonner on L.A. Doctors, and Sheriff Fred Langston on the series Resurrection.

== Early life ==
Craven, a Canadian, spent his early life in Ontario. His father died six weeks after his birth and Craven ultimately dropped out of high school to work a variety of odd jobs to help support his mother and sister. He was about 20 when he discovered his love for acting - auditioning for, and starring in, a local production of Dracula as Jonathan Harker.

== Career ==
Matt Craven is best known as a character actor working in TV and film. His films include the Academy Award nominated Crimson Tide, A Few Good Men, the SAG nominated X-Men: First Class, Public Enemies, Disturbia, Déjà Vu, The Life of David Gale, Tin Men and K2. Craven's first film Meatballs opposite Bill Murray was a huge hit and launched Craven's career in film and comedy. Craven's second feature, the live action short Bravery in the Field was nominated for an Academy Award.

The next few years saw Craven starring in several comedy pilots. His first major dramatic film was the drama/horror/mystery cult favorite Jacob's Ladder which follows a haunted Vietnam vet as he attempts to discover his past while suffering from a severe case of dissociation. Craven starred as Michael, a chemist in the Army's chemical warfare division where he worked on a drug that was secretly given to the veteran's unit.

On television, Craven has worked with Steven Spielberg as a series regular on High Incident, on TNT's Nuremberg and Kingfish: A Story of Huey P. Long, opposite Jeff Goldblum on Raines, several seasons on the international hit NCIS, and extensively with producer/writer Graham Yost on Justified, From the Earth to the Moon, The Pacific and Boomtown. Most recently, Craven starred on the ABC series Resurrection.

Craven had two features for 2015 - Roland Emmerich's Stonewall and Unless in which he stars opposite Catherine Keener.

== Filmography ==
=== Movies ===
Year	Title	Role	Notes
1979	Bravery in the Field	Lennie	Short
1979	Meatballs	"Hardware" Renzetti	
1980	Hog Wild	"Chrome"	
1981	Happy Birthday to Me	Steve Maxwell	
1984	That's My Baby!	Andy	
1986	Agent on Ice	Joey Matera	
1987	Tin Men	Looney	
1988	Palais Royale	Gerald Price	
1989	Chattahoochee	Lonny	
1990	Blue Steel	Howard	
1990	Jacob's Ladder	Michael Newman	
1991	K2	Harold "H" Jameson	
1992	A Few Good Men	Lieutenant Dave Spradling	
1993	Indian Summer	Jamie Ross	
1994	Bulletproof Heart (aka Killer)	Archie	
1994	Double Cross	Bernard March	Video
1995	Crimson Tide	Lieutenant Roy Zimmer, USS Alabama Communications Officer	
1995	Breach of Trust	Rodney Powell	
1996	The Juror	Boone	
1996	The Final Cut	Emerson Lloyd	
1996	White Tiger	John Grogan	
1996	Never Too Late	Carl	
1997	Masterminds	Jake Paxton	
1998	Paulie	Warren Alweather	
2000	Things You Can Tell Just by Looking at Her	Walter	(segments "Fantasies About Rebecca" and "Love Waits For Kathy")
2002	Dragonfly	Eric	
2003	The Life of David Gale	Dusty Wright	
2003	Timeline	Steven Kramer	
2003	The Statement	David Manenbaum	
2004	The Clearing	FBI Agent Ray Fuller	
2004	Bandido	Fletcher	
2005	Assault on Precinct 13	Officer Kevin Capra	
2005	A Simple Curve	Matthew	
2006	Déjà Vu	ATF Special Agent Larry Minuti	
2007	Disturbia	Daniel Brecht	
2007	American Venus	Bob	
2008	The Longshots	Coach Fisher	
2009	Public Enemies	FBI Agent Gerry Campbell	
2010	Devil	Lustig	
2011	X-Men: First Class	CIA Director McCone	
2012	The Good Lie	Richard Francis	
2013	White House Down	Roy Kellerman	
2015	Stonewall	Deputy Seymour Pine	
2016	Unless	Tom	
2017	Awakening the Zodiac	Harvey	
2022	Lou	Sheriff Rankin	
2025	Stolen Girl	Joe	

=== Television ===
Year	Title	Role	Notes
1980–1983	The Littlest Hobo		3 Episodes: Ghost Rig, The Hero, Winner Take All
1981	The Intruder Within	Phil	TV movie
1982	Till Death Do Us Part	Tony Archer	TV movie
1983	The Terry Fox Story	Bob Cady	TV movie
1986	Classified Love	Howie	TV movie
1986	Tough Cookies	Richie Messina	6 Episodes
1986	Philip Marlowe, Private Eye	Pete	1 Episode: Red Wing
1986	Comedy Factory	Eddie	1 Episode: Hearts of Steel
1987	Harry	Bobby Kratz	7 Episodes
1987	American Playhouse	Norbert	1 Episode: Blue Window
1995	Kingfish: A Story of Huey P. Long	Seymour Weiss	TV movie
1995	The Outer Limits	Alan Wells	1 Episode: The Voyage Home
1995	Kansas	Matt	TV movie
1995	American Gothic	Barrett Stokes	1 Episode: Strong Arm of the Law
1996–1997	High Incident	Officer Lenny Gayer	32 Episodes
1998	Dead Man's Gun	Stuart "Snake Finger" Aikins	1 Episode: Snake Finger
1998	Tempting Fate	Emmett Lach	TV movie
1998	From the Earth to the Moon	Tom Kelly	1 Episode: Spider
1998–1999	L.A. Doctors	Dr. Tim Lonner	24 Episodes
2000	Nuremberg	Captain Gustave Gilbert	1 Episode: #1.1
2000–2001	ER	Gordon Price	3 Episodes: The Dance We Do; Rock, Paper, Scissors; Never Say Never
2001	Bleacher Bums	Greg	TV movie
2001	Varian's War	"Beamish"	TV movie
2002	Scared Silent	Scott Miller	TV movie
2002–2003	Boomtown	Dr. Michael Hirsch	2 Episodes: Coyote, Lost Child
2003	The Lyon's Den	George Riley	6 Episodes
2005	Karol: A Man Who Became Pope	Hans Frank	TV movie
2005	Without a Trace	Larry Hopkins	1 Episode: A Day in the Life
2007	Raines	Captain Daniel Lewis	
2009	Anatomy of Hope	Hal Davis	TV movie
2010	The Pacific	Dr. Grant	1 Episode: Gloucester/Pavuvu/Banika
2010–2014	Justified	Chief Deputy U.S. Marshal Dan Grant	4 Episodes: Fire in the Hole, The Moonshine War, Full Commitment, A Murder of Crowes
2011–2013	NCIS	Secretary of the Navy Clayton Jarvis	10 Episodes
2012	Alcatraz	Mr. K	1 Episode: Tommy Madsen
2014–2015	Resurrection	Sheriff Fred Langston	21 Episodes
2018	Sharp Objects	Bill Vickery	8 Episodes
2019	Unspeakable	Horace Krever	2 Episodes: Krever (1993–1996), Intent (1997–2005)
2020	Stumptown	Michael McConnell	2 Episodes: At All Costs: The Conrad Costas Chronicles, All Hands on Dex
2023–2026	The Last Thing He Told Me	Andrew Hall	2 Episodes
2023	Justified: City Primeval	Chief Deputy U.S. Marshal Dan Grant	1 Episode: The Question
2024	Under the Bridge	Roy Bentland	7 Episodes
2026–present	Silo	Victor Crnkovich	8 Episodes

== Personal life ==
Since 1992 Craven has been married to Sally Sutton, the makeup artist whom he met on the set of K2. They have two children, Nicholas and Josephine.

Craven is a strong supporter of One Heart Source an organisation designed to empower at risk children through education in Africa. He is an avid golfer. In his spare time, he enjoys gardening, cooking and woodworking. He worked as a doorman for the nightclub The Bitter End and is a lifelong fan of the Toronto Maple Leafs.
