= Operation Crossroads Africa =

Non-profit organization

Operation Crossroads Africa (OCA) is a non-profit, non-governmental organization working to build links between North America and Africa. It was founded in 1958 by Presbyterian clergyman James Herman Robinson. OCA annually sends groups of young volunteers from North America to work on projects in Africa. At its peak in the 1960s OCA sent about 350 people per year. As of 2014, it sends about 50 people per year. In total over 10,000 have been sent. The organization has also expanded to the Caribbean and Brazil. OCA is often cited as a forerunner of the Peace Corps.

== See also ==
- The New York Foundation
- One Heart Source
