= Greg Mortimer (ship) =

Cruise ship

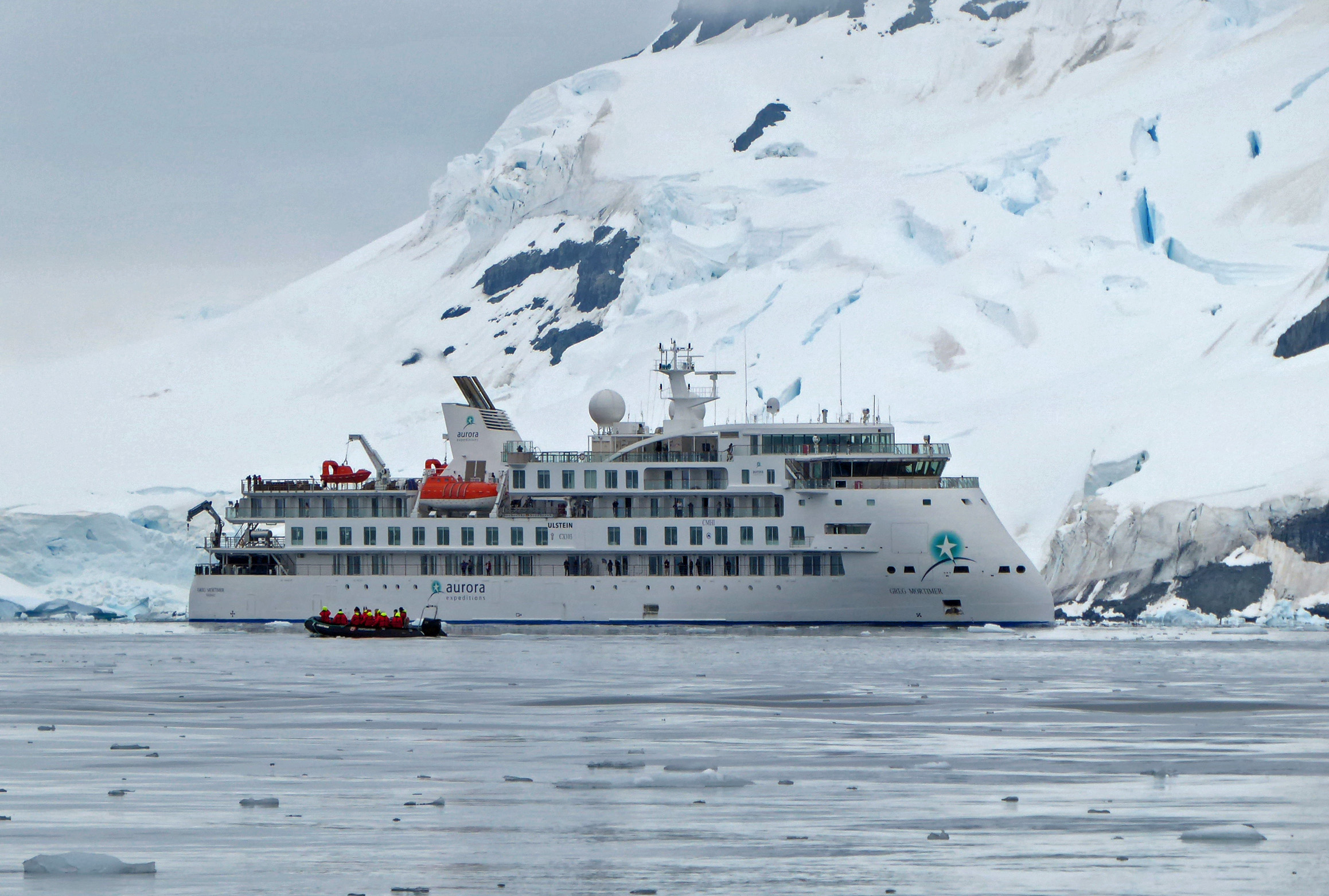
- Greg Mortimer off Antarctica in 2020

History

Bahamas
- Name: Greg Mortimer
- Namesake: Greg Mortimer
- Owner: SunStone Ships
- Operator: Aurora Expeditions
- Builder: China Merchants Heavy Industry, Jiangsu, China
- Yard number: Hull No. CMHI-196-1
- Laid down: 12 June 2018
- Launched: 12 March 2019
- Christened: 6 September 2019
- Identification: IMO number: 9834648; MMSI number: 311000866; Call sign: C6ED7
- Status: In service

General characteristics
- Class & type: Infinity-class cruise ship
- Tonnage: 7,892 GT
- Length: 104.4 m (343 ft)
- Beam: 18.4 m (60 ft)
- Draft: 5.3 m (17 ft)
- Decks: 8
- Ice class: PC6, Polar Category: B
- Propulsion: 2 x Ingeteam
- Speed: 12 knots (22 km/h; 14 mph)
- Capacity: 126

Greg Mortimer is a cruise ship operated by Aurora Expeditions. The ship was named in honour of the company's founder Greg Mortimer, in a combined naming and delivery ceremony at CMHI's Haimen base on 6 September 2019.

== Design and description ==
The ship one of seven Infinity-class vessels built by CMHI and owned by Sunstone Ships. It is a 104 m (341 ft 2 in) expedition ship with a state of the art x-bow design which has a piercing effect on smaller waves, making for a smoother ride. It has 80 cabins.

== Construction and career ==
The ship was named after the Australian mountaineer, polar explorer and founder of Aurora Expeditions, Greg Mortimer. Mortimer arguably became best known as one of the first two Australians (with Tim Macartney-Snape) to successfully climb Mount Everest, on 3 October 1984.

=== COVID-19 pandemic ===
On 7 April 2020, the cruise ship, which holds up to 216 passengers, became stranded in South American waters, asking for help after people exhibited symptoms such as fever, which prompted authorities to ban them from disembarking. Uruguay was the only country which allowed the cruise ship to dock, after Uruguayan medical teams boarded the cruise ship to test passengers on 1 April, 81 people tested positive for COVID-19. Six people found seriously ill with coronavirus were evacuated and transferred to a hospital in Montevideo.

The ship received permission to dock and Uruguayan authorities arranged an evacuation flight to Australia and New Zealand. By that time 128 persons on the vessel had tested positive for COVID-19. Six had transferred to a hospital in Montevideo. Passengers from Europe and America who had positive tests would not be allowed to travel to their home countries until their subsequent tests indicated negative results. On the night of 10 April some passengers were evacuated in order to fly to Australia. On 18 April, a 52-year-old Filipino crewman died of the coronavirus.

=== Repairs and substitution ===
In July 2023 the Greg Mortimer suffered propeller damage, and was placed in dry dock for repairs. While under repair, Aurora substituted a similar Infinity-class ship, the Ocean Explorer.
