= Rick Ridgeway =

American adventurer

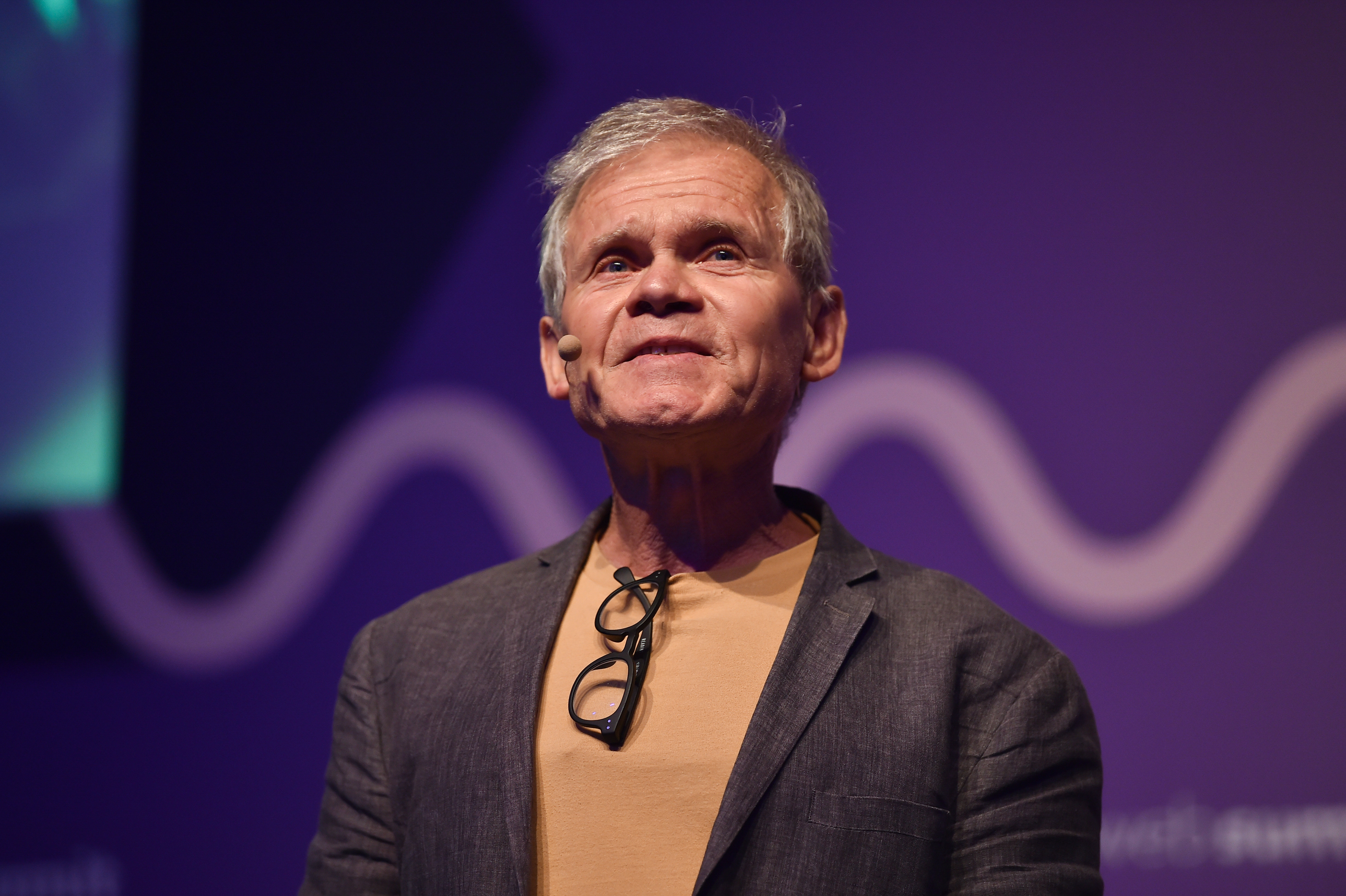
Rick Ridgeway in 2018

Rick Ridgeway (born August 12, 1949) is an American mountaineer and adventurer, who during his career has also been an environmentalist, writer, filmmaker and businessman. Ridgeway has climbed new routes and explored little-known regions on six continents. He was part of the 1978 team that were the first Americans to summit K2, the world's second-highest mountain. From 2005 until he retired in 2020 he oversaw environmental affairs and public engagement at the outdoor clothing company Patagonia. He has authored seven books and dozens of magazine articles, and produced or directed many documentary films.

== Mountaineering and adventure ==
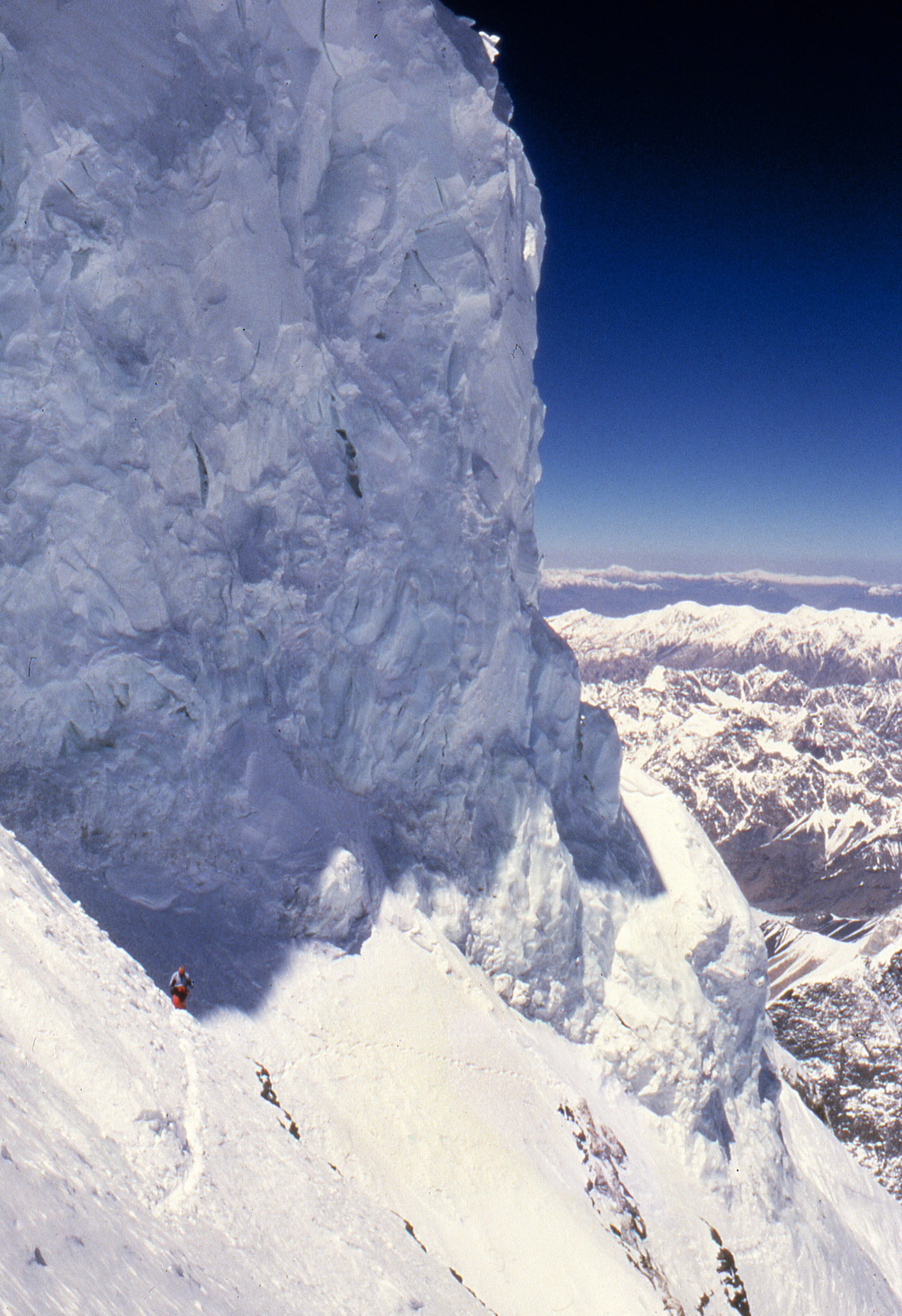
Formidable serac loom above the Bottleneck, 400m below the 28,251 ft summit of K2 – the second highest in the world, which Ridgeway reached without supplemental oxygen in 1978 (image from 1986)

Ridgeway started his mountaineering career in the late '60s and early '70s, making first ascents and new routes on a series of expeditions to the Peruvian Andes. In 1976 he joined the American Bicentennial Everest Expedition, and that led to joining the 1978 expedition to K2. Ridgeway and his three teammates were the first Americans to summit K2, the world's second highest mountain (8,611 m/28,251 ft) located in the Karakoram range. K2 is known for the inherent danger in climbing it, featuring a steep pyramidal relief and long sections of rock and ice, and unstable, overhanging serac. On September 6, 1978, Jim Wickwire and Louis Reichardt reached the summit of K2 via the Abruzzi Spur. The following day, Rick Ridgeway and John Roskelley abandoned a direct finish on the NE Ridge, and traversed under the summit pyramid to reach the summit via the Abruzzi finish. Ridgeway, Roskelley and Reichardt accomplished the feat without the use of supplemental oxygen.

In the early '80s Ridgeway joined the original Seven Summits expeditions, and also began to explore little known regions − making the first direct coast-to-coast traverse of Borneo, and exploring remote regions from the Amazon to Antarctica.

== Environmentalism ==
=== Conservation ===
During his explorations Ridgeway witnessed the degradations of the wildlands that had come to define his life: he saw firsthand remote grasslands in Patagonia turned to tourist cities, and the glaciers on Kilimanjaro disappear. He also witnessed the wildlife that inhabited those wildlands decline, and in the mid-'90s he began a series of journeys that allowed him to communicate, through books and films, what was happening to these formerly wild regions. In 1996 he and companions climbed Kilimanjaro and from the summit walked 500 kilometers (310.6 miles) to the sea, giving Ridgeway a vehicle to report on the fate of Africa's wildlife. In 2004 he and companions Jimmy Chin, Galen Rowell, and Conrad Anker followed the migration of the endangered chiru, walking without support 300 miles (482.8 km) across uninhabited grasslands in northwest Tibet to confirm the locations of the species' calving grounds. Ridgeway's book, The Big Open, and accompanying National Geographic television show and magazine article assisted the acclaimed wildlife conservationist George Schaller to convince the Chinese government to create a 15,000 square mile protected area around the calving grounds.

=== Sustainability ===
In 2009, while working with Patagonia, Ridgeway asked WalMart to partner with Patagonia to invite companies in the apparel and footwear sectors to build a standardized tool to measure both the environmental and social/labor impacts of products across their entire value chains. Ridgeway was subsequently founding Chairman of The Sustainable Apparel Coalition that has grown to 90 companies, NGO's, universities and government agencies, representing over 30% of global apparel and footwear production. In 2012 the Coalition released the Version 1.0 Higg Index tool that is being implemented across the supply chains of member companies to measure, and in that way to manage, environmental and social/labor impacts.

== Business career ==
In 1977 Ridgeway became a retained consultant for the Kelty Pack Company where for the next 25 years he assisted in marketing and product development. In the late '80s Kelty created a line of sleeping bags, packs and tents called Ridgeway by Kelty that were produced until 2015. In 1987 he launched Adventure Photo & Film, eventually representing over 150 photographers and filmmakers in what became the world's largest stock photo and film agency specializing in nature and adventure imagery. In 2000 Ridgeway successfully sold the business and returned to consulting, filmmaking and writing. I In 2005 he joined Patagonia as the VP of Environmental Affairs, then shifted to VP of Public Engagement until he retired in 2020. Today Ridgeway has returned to his lifelong passion for writing, releasing his memoir Life Lived Wild in 2021. He is an inspirational speaker at events and leading corporations.

== Writing and filmmaking ==
Ridgeway has written dozens of magazine articles for such publications as: Outside, National Geographic Magazine, and Harvard Business Review. He has also authored books, such as: The Boldest Dream (1978); The Last Step (1980); Seven Summits (1985), The Shadow of Kilimanjaro (1997), Below Another Sky (2002), and The Big Open (2006).

Ridgeway has produced and directed many adventure films; a notable recent effort was as co-producer of 180° South: Conquerors of the Useless.

== Boards and councils ==
- Board member of Earth Day Network
- Board member of the Kiewit Family Foundation
- Member of the World Wildlife Fund National Council
- Member of the National Geographic Expeditions Council
- Directors Guild of America
- Screen Actors Guild

== Recognitions ==
Ridgeway's writing has been recognized by American Alpine Club with a Halprin Award for Best Writing. His book A Life Lived Wild: Adventures at the Edge of the Map was a winner of the National Outdoor Book Awards in 2022.

His films have also won awards, including the Golden Eagle Award (1981), the Robert F. Kennedy Award (1983), and an Emmy (Everest, 1983).

In 2008, National Geographic recognized Rick's career contributions to adventure and exploration with its "Lifetime Achievement in Adventure" award.

In 2022 Rick received the Explorers Medal from the Explorers Club, its highest recognition.

== Bibliography ==
Books

- Ridgeway, Rick. Boldest Dream: Story of Twelve Who Climbed Mount Everest. New York: Harcourt Brace Jovanovich, 1979.
- Ridgeway, Rick. The Last Step: The American Ascent of K2. Seattle, WA: Mountaineers Books, 1980.
- Bass, Dick; Frank Wells, Rick Ridgeway. Seven Summits, New York: Warner Books, 1986.
- Ridgeway, Rick. The Shadow of Kilimanjaro. New York: Holt Paperbacks, 1998.
- Ridgeway, Rick. Below Another Sky: A Mountain Adventure in Search of a Lost Father. New York: Holt Paperbacks, 1998.
- Ridgeway, Rick. Big Open: On Foot Across Tibet's Chang Tang. National Geographic, 2005.
- Ridgeway, Rick. Life Lived Wild: Adventures at the Edge of the Map. Patagonia Works, 2021.

Magazines (Partial List)

- "The Heart of Whiteness" Outside Magazine December 1979
- "Part at the Top of the World" National Geographic Magazine June 1982
- "Race for the Seventh Summit" Outside Magazine August 1984
- "Wild and Windswept—Channel Islands National Park" National Geographic Traveler, Spring 1985
- "Walking Where the Wild Things Are" National Geographic Adventure October 2000
- "Below Another Sky" Outside Magazine December 2000
- "275 Miles on Foot through the Remote Chang Tang" National Geographic Magazine April 2003
- "Knocking on Heaven's Door" National Geographic Traveler July 2007
- The Big Idea: The Sustainable Economy. Chouinard, Yvon; Jib Ellison, Rick Ridgeway. 2011. Harvard Business Review

Film

Film Making Credits

- Minya Konka. ABC, 1980. Co-producer
- To Climb a Mountain. HBO, 1981. Director/Co-Producer
- Everest. ABC, 1983. Associate Producer/Co-Host
- Great Borneo Traverse. Disney, 1983. Director/Producer/Featured On-Camera
- Rafting into Siberia. ABC, 1988. Director
- Trans-Antarctica. ABC, 1989. Director/Producer
- Soviet Pamirs Rafting. ESPN, 1991. Director/Producer
- Climb the Amazon. ESPN, 1992. Director/Producer
- Rock N' Road. ESPN, 1993. Director/Producer
- Beyond Denali. ESPN, 1993. Director/Producer
- Kilimanjaro: Summit to Sea. Outdoor Life Channel, 1996. Director/Producer
- Far Side of Antarctica. National Geographic Explorer, 1997. Director/Producer
- Fashioned for Extinction. National Geographic Explorer, 2004. Director/Producer
- 180° South. Showtime Feature Release, 2008. Executive Producer/Co-Producer

Features and TV Drama

- Steadman. TV Series Pilot, 1977. Rigger/Stuntman
- Calloway's Climb. Robert Halmi Productions, 1978. Rigger/Stuntman/Short Acting Segment
- High Ice. NBC MOW, 1979. Rigger/Location Scout
- Ascent. Warner Bros., 1988. Associate Producer/2nd Unit Director.
