= Eric Francis (journalist) =

American investigative reporter

Eric Francis Coppolino
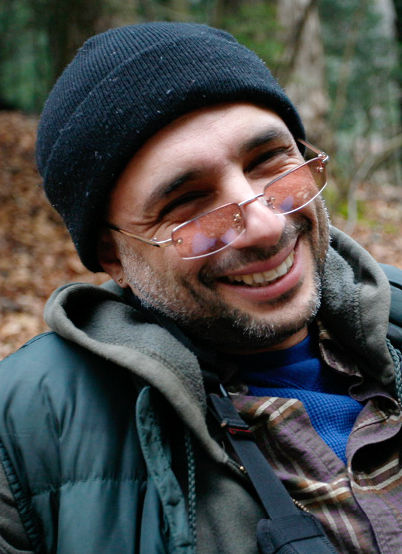
- Born: 1964 (age 61–62); Brooklyn, New York
- Education: SUNY Buffalo
- Occupation: Journalist
- Employer(s): Planet Waves, Inc., New York Daily News
- Known for: Planet Waves, Book of Blue
- Website: Planet Waves

Eric Francis Coppolino (born 1964) is an American investigative reporter who specializes in corporate fraud and toxic torts litigation, and also the former astrologer for the New York Daily News and Marie Claire magazine.

In 2005, while based in Paris, he created Book of Blue, a fine art photo studio and series of online books. He is currently the host of Planet Waves FM on Pacifica Radio Network and editor of the astrology website Planet Waves.

== Early life ==
Eric Francis was born in Brooklyn, New York to Joseph Coppolino, a professor of communications, and Camille Cacciatore, a language teacher. At John Dewey High School, he was editor in chief of Gadfly, the official social science journal.

In 1984 Francis founded Generation, a weekly student magazine at the University at Buffalo.

== Career ==
=== Journalist ===
Eric Francis' first journalism job was as a staff reporter for the Echoes-Sentinel in Warren Township, New Jersey.

He was a reporter/editor at Whitaker Newsletters, Inc., assigned to Health Professions Report, where he covered the American Medical Association, the American Nurses' Association and other medical industry issues, at the height of the nursing shortage in the late 1980s.

He then moved into investigative journalism, in 1989 founding New York State Student Leader, later the Student Leader News Service (SLNS), in New Paltz, New York. SLNS covered higher education for the State and City University systems in New York; it chronicled the chronic budget cuts and tuition increases of the time, and was the first dependable student news entity covering the State University Board of Trustees and the New York State Legislature. The New York Times described Francis as one of the few people not on the state payroll who understood the state budget. Beginning in the late 1990s, he also wrote a column for Chronogram magazine.

=== Coverage of PCBs and dioxins ===
As editor of SLNS, he covered the SUNY New Paltz PCB disaster of December 29, 1991, in which a transformer accident contaminated several dormitories with PCBs and dioxin, one of few reporters to do so after the first month of what became a decade-plus cleanup that cost state taxpayers $50 million by 1997. His investigative articles on the issue have been published in Sierra, the magazine of the Sierra Club, the Village Voice, Woodstock Times, the Las Vegas Sun, The St. Louis Journalism Review, Lies of Our Times, and other national and international publications.

His persistent coverage led to his being banned from the New Paltz campus as an alleged public nuisance on May 5, 1993. Challenging the ban, he brought a federal lawsuit against the State of New York in the persons of college president Dr. Alice Chandler and associate vice president for student affairs Dr. L. David Eaton, on freedom of speech and equal protection grounds (1st and 14th amendments), represented by civil rights attorney Alan Sussman. In summer 1994, the case was settled out of court, he was paid $20,000 damages, and the ban was rescinded with an acknowledgement from the state that his civil rights "may have been violated".

=== Investigative journalism and The Poison Papers ===
Coppolino has worked as an investigative journalist covering industrial pollution, chemical contamination, and corporate practices. His reporting has included investigations into dioxins and PCBs and the activities of companies associated with their manufacture and environmental release. In 1994, he began studying astrology while working on investigations involving chemical pollution. Coppolino contributed approximately 75,000 pages of corporate documents from his personal collection to The Poison Papers, an archive of internal corporate and government records concerning toxic substances, chemical safety, and environmental regulation.

=== Astrology and Planet Waves ===
Coppolino is an astrologer and the founder of Planet Waves, through which he publishes astrological commentary and writing on current affairs and culture. He began studying astrology intensively in 1994 while continuing his investigative reporting career and subsequently began writing horoscope columns for magazines. His work combines astrological interpretation with commentary on social and cultural developments. He also hosts Planet Waves FM, a program associated with the publication.

=== Coverage of the COVID-19 Pandemic ===
Coppolino is the founder of Chiron Return, a nonprofit organization that publishes Planet Waves FM and is the official nonprofit affiliate of the Pacifica Radio Network. The stated mission of Chiron Return is “mentorship in journalism.”

On March 3, 2020, 10 days before the national emergency was declared, Coppolino began a daily blog covering the COVID-19 crisis. The intent was to document news reports related to the COVID test and the provenance of viral source materials used in the polymerase chain reaction.

His group maintained the blog until May 31, 2023 and in the process, created a comprehensive primary source chronology of the crisis dating back to 2006.

=== Coverage of the East Palestine train derailment ===
Following the February 3, 2023, derailment of a Norfolk Southern freight train in East Palestine, Ohio, Coppolino published commentary on the potential environmental consequences of the incident, focusing particularly on dioxins and the combustion of chlorinated chemicals. His reporting drew on his previous work concerning industrial pollution and chemical contamination. In February 2023, he discussed the derailment and dioxin-related concerns in an interview featured on the Terrain Theory podcast.

=== Writing on Marshall McLuhan ===
In May 2026, Coppolino contributed an article titled “An Unsealed Letter: Astrology of McLuhan’s ‘The Medium is the Message’” to the McLuhan Newsletter, published by Andrew McLuhan. The article examined the astrological chart associated with Marshall McLuhan's May 5, 1958, presentation at the University of British Columbia, in which McLuhan publicly presented an early version of the phrase “the medium is the message.” Coppolino approached the event through astrological interpretation, connecting the chart to McLuhan's ideas about media, technology, and culture.
