= Chongtar Kangri =

Mountain peak in the Xinjiang region, China

- Chongtar Peak
- Location within Southern Xinjiang Location within Karakoram

Highest point
- Elevation: 7,315 m (23,999 ft); Ranked 80th
- Prominence: 1,300 m (4,300 ft)
- Listing: List of mountains in China
- Coordinates: 35°55′10″N 76°25′23″E

Geography
- Location: Xinjiang, China near Pakistan border
- Parent range: Karakoram

Climbing
- First ascent: 1994, Greg Mortimer

Chongtar Kangri or Chongtar Peak is a mountain peak in the Xinjiang region of China. Chongtar is situated about 10 km (6.2 mi) northwest of K2 and lies on China's border with Pakistan.

It was first summited by Australian climber Greg Mortimer, in 1994. It was the world's highest unclimbed peak at the time.

== See also ==
- Geography of China
