= Arthur Lander =

American biologist (born 1958)

Arthur D. Lander
- Born: September 12, 1958 (age 67)
- Spouse: Anne Calof
- Scientific career
- Institutions: University of California, Irvine; University of California, San Francisco; Massachusetts Institute of Technology; Yale University
- Thesis: Purification and characterization of "Neurite Outgrowth-Promoting Factors (1985)
- Website: lander-office.bio.uci.edu/landerfacts.html

Arthur D. Lander is an American biologist who is Director of the Center for Complex Biological Systems at the University of California, Irvine.

== Education ==
He was born in Brooklyn, New York, and is an alumnus of John Dewey High School there. He received a Bachelor of Arts from Yale University and a combined M.D., Ph.D. from the University of California, San Francisco, under the direction of Louis Reichardt. His first faculty position was jointly in the Department of Brain and Cognitive Sciences and the Department of Biology at Massachusetts Institute of Technology. He moved as Professor to Irvine in 1995.

== Research ==
Lander's research is focused on the Systems Biology of Development, and deals with topics in Developmental Biology, Cell Biology, Mathematical & Computational Biology, Glycobiology, Neurobiology, and Engineering for example, of Laminin.

== Academic service ==
Lander serves on the editorial boards of PLOS Biology and the Journal of Biology, is a member of the American Society for Clinical Investigation, a fellow of the American Association for the Advancement of Science, and a member of the Science Board of the Santa Fe Institute (SFI).

== Personal ==
His brother, Eric Lander, is a geneticist and Professor of Biology at the Massachusetts Institute of Technology (MIT), former member of the Whitehead Institute, and founding director of the Broad Institute of MIT and Harvard. His wife, Anne Calof, is a professor in the Department of Anatomy & Neurobiology at Irvine.
