= Marty Hoey =

American mountaineer

Marty Hoey (1951 – May 15, 1982) was a mountaineer and mountain guide who took part in a 1982 expedition to Mount Everest. During an attempted ascent that would have made her the first American woman to summit Everest, she plunged over the edge of the Great Couloir to her death, as the result of an unsecured climbing harness. She had scaled Washington's Mount Rainier over 100 times, and led expeditions on Alaska's Denali.

== Climbing career ==
For more than ten years, Hoey worked as a professional guide on Mount Rainier and on Mount McKinley, and she also climbed on more distant ranges. Hoey climbed Pik Lenin in 1974 and was a part of the 1976 Nanda Devi expedition.

Hoey also worked for Dick Bass, as safety patrol chief at the Snowbird ski resort. She befriended him and accompanied him on his own successful ascent of Mount McKinley, and he was a member of her climbing group when she perished on Mount Everest, in 1982. When Bass eventually summitted Everest in 1985, he dedicated his ascent to her.

=== Death on Everest ===
According to expedition teammate Jim Wickwire, on May 15, 1982, he and Hoey were perched on a 45-degree rock slope at about 26,600 feet (8,100 m), carrying gear to establish Camp 6, with the expectation of heading for the summit in the next day or two. Wickwire said that Hoey leaned back to let him go ahead, and a buckle on her harness opened, releasing her from the fixed rope and sending her plunging down 6,000 feet (1,800 m) into a crevasse.

Hoey's body was never recovered. Whittaker said, "I can't think of a more beautiful resting place; she fell into the prettiest place that ever was." Whittaker cited Hoey's death as a contributing factor to the expedition's failure to summit Everest, saying: "If Marty had been with us, we would have made it." The 16 remaining team members, all men, would make a third and final attempt, and ultimately be turned back, shy of the summit, by fierce weather.

Hoey was one of ten fatalities on Everest in the 1982 climbing season, but the only American. Some other fatalities that season were noted British climbers Peter Boardman and Joe Tasker.

== See also ==
- List of people who died climbing Mount Everest
