= Araminta's Wedding =

1993 novella by Jilly Cooper

- Author: Jilly Cooper
- Illustrator: Sue Macartney-Snape
- Cover artist: Sue Macartney-Snape
- Language: English
- Genre: Satire, romance
- Set in: 20th-century England
- Publication date: 1993
- Publication place: UK
- Website: www.jillycooper.co.uk/books/aramintas-wedding/

Araminta's Wedding is a 1993 satirical novella by English author Jilly Cooper, based on illustrations by artist Sue Macartney-Snape. The book was praised by The Daily Telegraph as a "comforting, childishly enjoyable, sumptuously illustrated read".

== Plot ==
The plot is based around the life of Lady Araminta Atherstone, who will inherit her father's Lincolnshire estate upon his death. Several men want to marry her, including her cousin Piggy Atherstone, and an aristocratic gambler known as Bounder Cartwright.

== Background ==
The illustrations for this book are a selection of works by Sue Macartney-Snape. These were not created specifically for the book, but were grouped together, and linked with new writing by Jilly Cooper. Cooper described how it was "jolly difficult" writing to existing illustrations and that the work was satirical in nature. Andrew Parker-Bowles contributed ideas to Cooper to be included in the prose.

== Reception ==
After the novella was published in 1993, the Vancouver Sun commented that it had relatively little sex in it, especially when compared to Cooper's other works. In one of several reviews by The Daily Telegraph, the text was described as "like a game of consequences" since the writing was linking the illustrations, rather than the illustrations describing the text. Another review by the same paper described Cooper's stereotypes as somewhat far-fetched on occasion, and praised the book as a "comforting, childishly enjoyable, sumptuously illustrated read". Macartney-Snape was described by The Telegraph as a "natural observer of the country set". She specialises in caricatures that feature the English upper classes, in a style described as "affectionate portraits". By June 1996 the book had sold 30,000 copies.

== Coincidental portrayals ==
The novella features a fox hunting association called the Atherstone Hunt; it was only after publication that Cooper realised there was also a real Atherstone Hunt Club. To apologise for accidentally featuring them, Cooper gave the hunt several copies of the book and gave a speech at a dinner event.

Illustrator Annie Tempest noted similarity between one of Macartney-Snape's figures in the book with one of her own characters.
