= Charlie Porter (mountaineer) =

American mountaineer and scientist (1950–2014)

Charlie Porter (June 12, 1950 in Massachusetts – February 23, 2014 in Punta Arenas) was an American rock climber, mountaineer and climate change scientist. He is best known for his first ascents of major big wall routes, often solo, in Yosemite (particularly on El Capitan), Canada and Alaska; and his significant influence on other notable climbers and the climbing community, in part due to his creation and development of innovative climbing equipment. He has also garnered a reputation as an adventurer (he was one of the first people to round Cape Horn in a kayak) and geoscientist in South America.

== Notable ascents ==
=== El Capitan, Yosemite, USA ===
Porter's notable big-wall first ascents on El Capitan include

- Zodiac 1972
- The Shield 1972
- Mescalito 1973
- Tangerine Trip 1973
- Excalibur 1975

Prior to the above routes, Porter's 1972 solo ascent of New Dawn (a variation of Warren Harding and Dean Caldwell's Wall of the Early Morning Light) in which he dropped his haul bag early in the route but continued to complete the climb 9 days later, sleeping in slings and an improvised sleeping bag made from ensolite foam, gained him significant notoriety in the climbing community.

=== Alaska ===
- First solo of the Cassin Ridge, Denali 1976. Described as "ahead of its time".
- West Face of Middle Triple Peak in the Kichatna Mountains with Russell McLean 1976.

=== Canada ===
- First-ever grade VII big wall climbing route, done solo on Baffin Island’s Mount Asgard 1975, described by Doug Scott as "a remarkable achievement".
- Polar Circus, V, WI 5, Cirrus Mountain, Banff National Park.

=== Tierra del Fuego ===
- Monte Sarmiento, West Peak. In 1995 he joined with Stephen Venables, John Roskelley, Jim Wickwire and Tim Macartney-Snape; however, during high winds Porter was blown off an icy ridge, managing to stop his slide off the mountain by jamming his arm in a crevasse, breaking a bone and dislocating his shoulder in the process, but saving his life.

== Adventurer and scientist ==
In 1979, Porter was the first person to kayak around Cape Horn. From the 1980s onward, he lived in South America where he continued his spirit of adventure, sailing to remote locations, regularly chartering his yacht and guiding services to marine and climate scientists whose research is based in southern South America.
