= Greg Mortimer =

Australian mountaineer (born 1952)

Personal information
- Nationality: Australian
- Born: 10 December 1952 (age 73) Sydney, New South Wales, Australia

Climbing career
- Type of climber: Mountaineer
- First ascents: Mount Everest, Nepal by a new route (1984), Mount Minto, Antarctica (1988), many first Australian ascents of major peaks.
- Major ascents: Annapurna II (1983), Mount Everest (1984), K2 (1990), Manaslu (2002),

Greg Mortimer OAM (born 10 December 1952) is an Australian climber. Mortimer is notable as one of the first two Australians (with Tim Macartney-Snape) to successfully climb Mount Everest, on 3 October 1984. Their ascent, without supplemental oxygen, was the first via the North Face and Norton Couloir. It is one of the climbing routes that has not been repeated often.

== Early life ==
Mortimer was born in 1952 in Sydney, New South Wales and grew up around Gladesville and Bondi Junction. He graduated in geochemistry and geology at Macquarie University, Sydney. He then worked as a survival-training instructor and as a Scientific Affairs Adviser for the New Zealand Antarctic Division.

== Mountaineering ==
Mortimer was the first to climb Annapurna II by its south face (1983), the first Australian to climb Antarctica's highest peak, Vinson Massif (1988), the first to climb Mount Minto in the Admiralty Mountains of Antarctica (1988) and, with Greg Child, one of the first two Australians to climb K2 (1990).

In 1991 Mortimer founded Aurora Expeditions.

Since 1992 he has led over 80 expeditions to Antarctica, many on a commercial basis with Aurora Expeditions.

In 1994, Mortimer summited Chongtar in China, which was then the world's highest unclimbed peak, some 10 km (6.2 mi) northwest of K2 in Pakistan.

== Honours and legacy ==
Mortimer is the recipient of a Medal of the Order of Australia (OAM) and three Australian Geographic Society medals. In 2019, Aurora Expeditions named its newbuild expedition vessel the Greg Mortimer.

The crux pitch on the North Face of Everest route pioneered by Mortimer is known as "Greg's Gully".

== Books about Greg Mortimer ==
- White Limbo: The First Australian Climb of Mt Everest (1985) by Lincoln Hall, Kevin Weldon, Sydney.
- The Loneliest Mountain: The Dramatic Story of the First Expedition to Climb Mt Minto, Antarctica (1989) by Lincoln Hall, Simon & Schuster, Sydney.
- First Ascent: The Life and Climbs of Greg Mortimer (1996) by Lincoln Hall, Simon & Schuster, Sydney.

== See also ==
- List of 20th-century summiters of Mount Everest
