= K2 (film) =

1991 film by Franc Roddam

- Theatrical movie poster
- Directed by: Franc Roddam
- Written by: Patrick Meyers; Scott Roberts
- Based on: K2 by Patrick Meyers
- Produced by: Jonathan Taplin; Tim Van Rellim
- Starring: Michael Biehn; Matt Craven; Raymond J. Barry; Hiroshi Fujioka; Patricia Charbonneau; Luca Bercovici
- Cinematography: Gabriel Beristain
- Edited by: Sean Barton
- Music by: Chaz Jankel; Hans Zimmer
- Production companies: Trans Pacific Films; Miramax Films; Screenscope; Phanos Development; Majestic Films International
- Distributed by: Paramount Pictures (United States); Entertainment Film Distributors (United Kingdom)
- Release dates: 22 November 1991 (United Kingdom); 1 May 1992 (United States)
- Running time: 104 minutes
- Countries: United Kingdom; United States; Japan; Canada
- Language: English
- Budget: $12 million
- Box office: $3.043 million

K2 is a 1991 survival drama film starring Michael Biehn and Matt Craven, directed by Franc Roddam, and written by Patrick Meyers and Scott Roberts, adapting Meyers' original 1982 stage play. It is loosely based on the story of Jim Wickwire and Louis Reichardt, the first Americans to summit the eponymous mountain, with Wickwire and Reichardt being acknowledged in the ending credits.

== Plot ==
Taylor Brooks and Harold Jameson are white-collar professionals by weekday, and accomplished mountain climbers on weekends. Though they share a love for scaling mountains, the two friends are opposites in their personal lives. Taylor is a thrill-seeking attorney and womanizer, while Harold is a married, level-headed scientist.

On a climb, the pair encounter billionaire Phillip Claiborne, who is accompanied by a team of fellow climbers. Taylor recognizes Dallas Woolf from law school, and the team lets slip that they are testing equipment for a Himalayan expedition. That night, two members of Claiborne's team ignore Harold's warnings of an impending avalanche and perish when snow careens down the mountain. Claiborne and the other survivors are rescued, thanks to quick action by Taylor and Harold. At the interment, Taylor begs Claiborne to take him and Harold on his expedition to K2, the second highest peak in the world. Claiborne ultimately allows the duo to fill the hole in his team.

The entire team heads to the Karakoram, in Pakistan, and starts the climb successfully, though Taylor butts heads with Dallas, while Harold feels guilt over leaving his wife for this adventure. As the ascent continues, the team's Balti porters go on strike (mirroring the real-world experiences of several expeditions in the 1970s), and altitude sickness incapacitates Claiborne. A four-man team (Taylor, Harold, Dallas, and Japanese climber Takane) continue toward the summit with minimal gear. They are stopped when Claiborne authorizes (talking via radio) only two men to go for the summit, while two wait in reserve at the high camp. Dallas chooses Takane as his climbing partner, despite argument from Taylor. Later, Takane returns to the high camp badly injured and in severe hypothermia, and dies soon afterward.

Taylor and Harold ascend, "searching for Dallas". After a grueling journey, the pair celebrate at the "top of the world". Their joy is short-lived, however, as Harold slips on the downclimb, breaks his leg badly, and loses the climbing rope. The pain is unbearable, and he cannot be moved. Over Taylor's objections, Harold sends Taylor to save himself, and Taylor begins a solo descent.

By luck, Taylor discovers Dallas's frozen body and scavenges his climbing rope, epinephrine (adrenaline), and an ice axe. Taylor injects Harold with an epinephrine autoinjector and then begins to lower his friend toward base camp, a few dozen feet at a time. They descend, until Taylor collapses on a ridge. Before dark, a Pakistani helicopter comes into view. The climbers are saved and rejoice.

== Cast ==
- Michael Biehn as Taylor Brooks
- Matt Craven as Harold "H" Jameson
- Raymond J. Barry as Phillip Claiborne
- Luca Bercovici as Dallas Woolf
- Patricia Charbonneau as Jackie Metcalf
- Julia Nickson-Soul as Cindy Jameson
- David Cubitt as Peter
- Hiroshi Fujioka as Takane Shimuzu
- Jamal Shah as Malik
- Cristian Caingin as Strygwyr

== Filming ==
K2 was filmed on location in Kashmir, Pakistan and British Columbia, Canada. Parts of the film were also shot in Snowbird, Utah.

== Source material ==
K2 was originally staged at the Brooks Atkinson Theatre in New York City in 1983. It had 10 previews and 85 performances. Writing in The New York Times, Frank Rich found the scenery “astounding” and “overpowering.” Of the dialogue, however, he wrote, “some of it sounds like padding and much of it is pretentious.” Indeed, Rich wrote, much of verbiage “sounds like warmed-over David Mamet"; he added that when they “are not force-feeding us their biographies or arguing like television debaters, the climbers can be saltily amusing.”

== Reception ==
K2 received negative reviews from critics. Kenneth Turan reviewed it favorably for the Los Angeles Times, remarking that "in truth, “K2" is something of a throwback, but a very sure-handed one. Once a cerebral two-character theater piece by Patrick Meyers, it has been adroitly turned inside out and transformed into an adventure film whose main asset is thrills and (quite literally) chills. Man-against-nature epics are hardly fashionable anymore, but director Franc Roddam shows how much life there is in the old dog yet." Vincent Canby's review in The New York Times was more mixed, writing that "the film's concerns and quality of imagination have very little to do with [Meyers'] play", that "the movie doesn't even make much of the cliches it introduces", that it "has some stunning if isolated sequences of physical daring", and that "both Mr. Biehn and Mr. Craven work hard but without success to bring life to their watered-down roles."

It currently holds a 35% rating on Rotten Tomatoes from 20 reviews.

=== Box office ===
The film didn't do very well at the box-office.
