= John Roskelley =

American mountain climber and author (born 1948)

- Born: December 1, 1948 (age 77); Spokane, Washington, U.S.
- Education: Washington State University (BS)
- Occupations: Mountaineer, author, politician
- Political party: Democratic
- Spouse: Joyce
- Children: 3, including Jess

John Roskelley (born December 1, 1948) is an American mountain climber and author. He made first ascents and notable ascents of 7,000-meter (22,966 ft.) and 8,000-meter peaks (26,247 ft.) in Nepal, India, and Pakistan. In 2014, he became the 6th winner of the Piolet d'Or Lifetime Achievement Award.

== Early life and education ==
Roskelley is an alumnus of Washington State University in Pullman, earning a bachelor's degree in 1971 in geology. He graduated from Shadle Park High School in west Spokane in 1967.

== Notable ascents ==
- 1973 Northeast Ridge Dhaulagiri, Nepal. Third ascent of peak. Summit reached with Louis Reichardt and Nawang Samden, May 12, 1973.
- 1976 Northwest Face Nanda Devi, U.P., India. New route and fifth ascent of peak. Summit reached by Roskelley, Louis Reichardt and Jim States on September 1, 1976. Because Nanda Devi Unsoeld, the daughter of Willi Unsoeld, died on the mountain, Roskelley's article describing the climb was called "Nanda Devi; the Tragic Expedition".
- 1977 First Ascent of Great Trango Tower with Galen Rowell, Dennis Hennek, Kim Schmitz and Jim Morrissey.
- 1978 Northeast Ridge/East Face and Abruzzi Ridge K2, Pakistan. New route and third ascent of peak. Summit reached by Louis Reichardt and Jim Wickwire on September 6, 1978; Roskelley and Rick Ridgeway reached the summit the next day. This was the first ascent of K2 by a team from the United States.
- 1979 West Face Gauri Sankar, Rolwaling Himalaya, Nepal. FA of Route and peak, with Sherpa Dorje, summitting on May 8, 1979.
- 1979 East Face (VII F8 A4) Uli Biaho, Karakorum, Pakistan. FA of route and peak with Ron Kauk, Bill Forrest and Kim Schmitz.
- 1980 Makalu, Nepal. Roskelley became the first American to climb the world's fifth highest mountain. He was the only one in a team of four from Spokane to reach the summit. The American Alpine Journal called the ascent "one of the ten outstanding alpinist achievements of the 20th century".
- 1982 Cholatse, Nepal. Cholatse is a landmark peak in the Solu Khumbu, known for its almost vertical north ridge. It was first-ascended by Roskelley, Galen Rowell, Vern Clevenger and Bill O'Connor via the southwest ridge.
- 1989 Northeast Face Taboche, Nepal. First ascent of route by Jeff Lowe and John Roskelley, reaching the summit on February 13, 1989. Climb chronicled in "Last Days" by John Roskelley (see Writings).
- 1995 Roskelley, Tim Macartney-Snape, Stephen Venables, Jim Wickwire and Charlie Porter attempted a new route on Monte Sarmiento, on the western shores of Tierra del Fuego, where Roskelley, Macartney-Snape and Venables summited via new route up the southwest face of the western summit.

== Conservation and public service ==
A noted conservationist, Roskelley served as Spokane County Commissioner from 1995 to 2004.

In 2012, Roskelley published Paddling the Columbia: A guide to all 1,200 miles of our scenic and historical river, a guidebook based on his journey by boat from the river’s source in British Columbia to the Pacific Ocean.

== Personal ==
Roskelley's son Jess (1982–2019) was also a mountain climber; the two successfully summited Mount Everest together on May 21, 2003. At that time Jess, aged 20, was the youngest American to have reached the summit of Everest.

John's father Fenton (1917–2013) was the son of a fly-fishing dentist, lived in rugged central Idaho as a youth (at Challis in Custer County), earned a journalism degree from the University of Idaho in Moscow, and was the longtime outdoor writer for the Spokane Daily Chronicle and The Spokesman-Review newspapers in Spokane. Fenton was married to Violet (1921–2012) for 67 years; she was from Yorkshire, England, and they met in Cornwall while both served during World War II. They married during leave in March 1945, and had three children; John is the middle child and only son.

== Writings ==
- Roskelley, John (1980). "The Obvious Line – Uli Biaho". American Alpine Journal. 22 (53). Golden, CO, USA: American Alpine Club: 405–416. ISBN 978-0-930410-76-6.
- Roskelley, John (1991). Last Days. Mechanicsburg, PA, USA: Stackpole Books. ISBN 978-0-8117-0889-0.
- Roskelley, John (1998). Stories Off the Wall. Seattle, WA: Mountaineers Books. ISBN 978-0-89886-609-4.
- Roskelley, John (2000). Nanda Devi: The Tragic Expedition. Seattle, WA: Mountaineers Books. ISBN 978-0-89886-739-8.
- Roskelley, John (2023). Fancy Dancer and the Seven Drums. Houston, TX: Di Angelo Publications. ISBN 978-1-955690-43-0.
