= Brandon Steiner =

American sports marketeer (born 1959)

- Born: June 23, 1959 (age 67); Flatbush, Brooklyn, New York
- Education: Syracuse University
- Occupation: Author
- Years active: 1987 - present
- Organization: Steiner Sports Marketing
- Spouse: Mara Steiner
- Children: 2
- Parent(s): Evelyn Sachs and Irving Steiner

Brandon Steiner (born June 23, 1959) is a sports marketer. He was the founder and former CEO of Steiner Sports now owned by Fanatics. He is currently the founder and CEO of CollectibleXchange and The Steiner Agency. He and his family live in Scarsdale, New York.

== Early life ==
Steiner was born in Flatbush, Brooklyn, New York. His parents, Evelyn Sachs and Irving Steiner, were both Jewish. According to Steiner, he was "extremely poor. I had no money." He is the middle of three sons: his older brother, Cary, is a writer and educator; his younger brother, Adam, is an anti-smoking activist.

Steiner graduated from John Dewey High School in Coney Island in 1977.

After graduation, he attended the Martin J. Whitman School of Management at Syracuse University. He was also a member of the Syracuse chapter of the Phi Gamma Delta fraternity serving as the treasurer. He graduated in 1981.

=== Everything bagel invention claim ===
Steiner has claimed to have invented the everything bagel in 1973. Steiner believes his invention at a bakery predates efforts by all the others. In a 2016 blog post, Steiner writes:

One night I was screwing around with different combinations of toppings – sesame, salt, poppy, onion and garlic – making braids, onion flats, and other unorthodox concoctions. Then, after a while, I had the thought to throw all the toppings on a bagel at once. That’s how I invented the everything bagel. This was 1973; I was 14.

== Career ==
=== Early years ===
After college, Steiner went to work for Hyatt Hotels and was part of the team that opened the Hyatt Inner Harbor in Baltimore, one of the company’s most successful hotels. In 1984, he moved back to New York City and helped open and manage operations at the new Hard Rock Cafe in New York City.

In 1985, Steiner and a team of investors opened the Sporting Club, one of the first modern sports bars in the country.

As the Sporting Club succeeded, Steiner was recruited by athletes such as Mickey Mantle, Ron Darling and Lawrence Taylor to help open their own sports bars. He also began to recruit athletes to make appearances at the Sporting Club.

=== Steiner Sports ===
In 1987, using his $8000 savings, Steiner launched Steiner Associates, a sports marketing company in New Rochelle, New York. It was an effort to pair up athletes with businesses that needed to draw customers. Steiner was reported as making company sales of $5 million by 1993, charging athletes between 10 and 20 percent commission.

Today the company is best known for its memorabilia. In 2000, Steiner sold Steiner Sports to Omnicom, but remains CEO and retains control over daily business operations.

In 2005 Steiner reached an agreement with the New York Yankees to create Yankees-Steiner Collectibles. As part of the agreement, Steiner would have license to "market a wide range of products, which will include game-used bases, bats, balls, player jerseys, caps and lineup cards." Later in 2005, Steiner reached a similar agreement with Notre Dame University to create Notre Dame Collectibles by Steiner In 2008, the Dallas Cowboys partnered with Steiner to form Cowboys-Steiner Collectibles. In 2010, the Madison Square Garden company partnered with Steiner to create MSG Steiner Collectibles. Under the deal, Steiner was given license to sell "artifacts, memorabilia and hand-signed items featuring the storied history – past and present – of the Knicks, Rangers, Liberty and The Garden."

Since 2006, Steiner has been the host of Memories of the Game on the YES Network.

In 2008, Steiner placed over a million athletes' signatures into the market.

In 2011, Newsday called Steiner "one of the most innovative, influential figures in the history of sports memorabilia."

As of 2012, Steiner Sports maintains relationships with over 5,000 athletes.

In June 2012, Steiner announced that he had acquired the rights to Don Larsen’s game-worn jersey from Game 5 of the 1956 World Series.

Steiner and Steiner Sports are perhaps best known for reaching an agreement with the New York Yankees in 2009 to sell off a wide variety of memorabilia from the Old Yankee Stadium including seats, signs, lockers and the Frieze.

In May 2019, Steiner Sports was sold to Fanatics.

==== CollectibleXchange and The Steiner Agency ====
After 32 years of overseeing Steiner Sports Marketing & Memorabilia, Brandon launched The Steiner Agency and the CollectibleXchange in late 2019.

The Steiner Agency connects clients with exclusive sports properties. They design and execute events on behalf of clients. CollectibleXchange (CX) is a marketplace within the collectibles space that allows individuals to buy, sell and appraise items, while also allowing players, coaches, executives, and agents to sell their collectibles (signed and game-used, for example).

==== Legal settlements ====
In 2005, Steiner Sports and MLB Advanced Media reached a settlement with the City of New York, after charges were brought that Steiner and MLB had deceived fans through e-mail promotions. As part of the settlement, Steiner paid $16,666 to the City of New York and contributed $33,333 worth of memorabilia to City Store.

In 2009, a class action lawsuit was filed against Steiner Sports and the Yankees, claiming that the two had repainted and made other modifications to seat pairs from the original Yankee Stadium that were advertised as completely unrefurbished. A settlement was reached in 2010, with Steiner admitting no wrongdoing.

== Author and speaker ==
Steiner has spoken at the Harvard Business School, Columbia, Yale, Financial Executives International, Manhattanville College, Syracuse University and others.

Steiner is the author of three books: The Business Playbook (2003), You Gotta Have Balls: How a Kid From Brooklyn Started From Scratch, Bought Yankee Stadium and Built a Sports Empire (September 2012) and Living on Purpose: Stories about Faith, Fortune, and Fitness That Will Lead You to an Extraordinary Life (December 2018).

== Personal life ==
In 1988, Steiner married his wife, Mara. They have two children, Crosby (1991) and Nicole (1994). Steiner is a longtime resident of Scarsdale, New York.
