= Jess Roskelley =

American mountain climber (1982–2019)

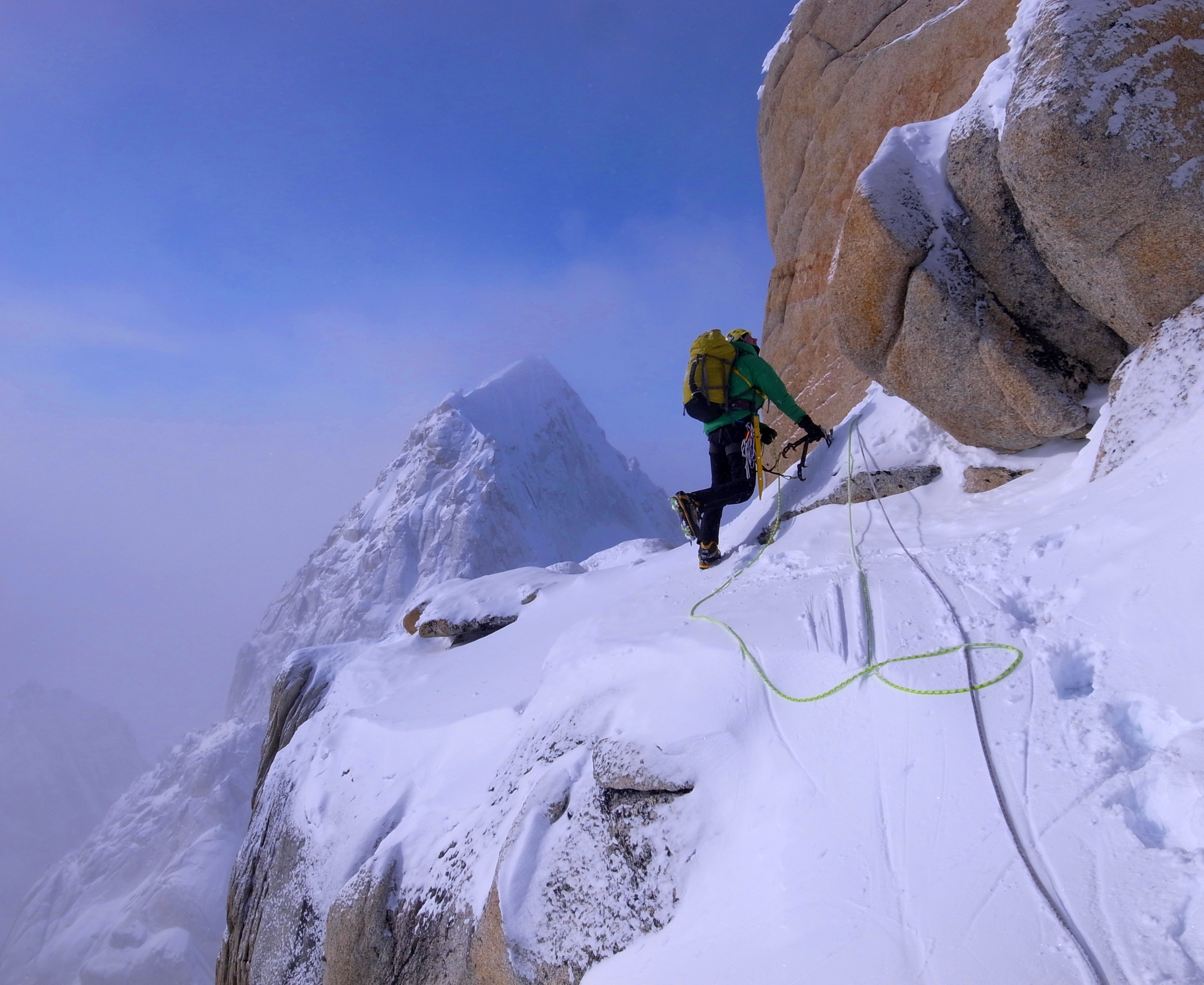
- Jess Roskelley near the summit of the Citadel during the first ascent of the Hypa Zypa Couloir, Alaska Range

Personal information
- Born: Jess Fenton Roskelley; July 13, 1982 Spokane, Washington, U.S.
- Died: April 16, 2019 (aged 36) Howse Peak, Alberta, Canada
- Education: University of Montana
- Occupations: Welder, mountaineer

Climbing career
- Type of climber: Sport climbing, bouldering, mountaineering
- Known for: Youngest American to reach the summit of Everest (2003) after Jordan Romero

Jess Fenton Roskelley (July 13, 1982 – April 16, 2019) was an American mountaineer. On May 21, 2003, at age twenty, he became the youngest American to reach the summit of Mount Everest. He died in an avalanche while climbing on Howse Peak in the Canadian Rockies.

== Early life ==
Roskelley was born on July 13, 1982, and raised in Spokane, Washington, where he attended Mt. Spokane High School. He was the son of mountaineer John Roskelley and Joyce Roskelley, a teacher. He later moved to Montana to attend the University of Montana.

== Career ==
Roskelley began his career in mountain climbing as a guide on Mount Rainier. He passed the Rainier Mountain Guides exam at the age of eighteen, and by the age of twenty (in 2003) he had reached the summit 35 times as a guide.

In March 2003, Roskelley and his father, mountaineer John Roskelley, traveled to Mount Everest as members of an expedition named "Generations on Everest". The expedition marked Jess's first attempt at the Everest summit, while it was his father's fourth attempt, having failed on three attempts earlier in his career. Father and son successfully reached the summit on May 21, 2003, at which time Jess Roskelley, at the age of 20, became the youngest American to have reached the summit of Mount Everest . In 2010, this record was surpassed by Jordan Romero, who summited Mount Everest at the age of 13.

Roskelley later while living in Spokane divided his time in Alaska between climbing and working as a tank welder. In October 2012, he and John Frieh climbed a new route on Mount Wake in the Alaska Range. They called the route The Cook Inlet. In April 2013, Roskelley, Ben Erdmann and Kristoffer Szilas forged a new route on the Citadel, a peak in the Kichatna Mountains of Alaska. The route, which is next to Supa Dupa Couloir, was named Hypa Zypa Couloir.

== Personal life and death ==
Roskelley was married on July 25, 2015, to Allison Spencer. Jess Roskelley has two sisters, Jordan and Dawn Roskelley. Roskelley was a sponsored athlete for Adidas Outdoor prior to joining The North Face Athlete Team in 2018.

Roskelley and Austrian climbers David Lama and Hansjörg Auer died on descent after reaching the summit of Howse Peak in Banff National Park of the Canadian Rockies on 16 April 2019. The group completed a difficult variation of a route on the east face of Howse Peak known as M-16 in under 7 hours. The Auer-Lama-Roskelley variation took a line to the left of M-16, after the first difficult waterfall pitch on that route. Their bodies were found on 21 April 2019.[12][13]

Photographic and GPS evidence recovered from the accident site and from Jess Roskelley's iPhone indicate they left their camp at the base of the east face at approximately 05:30 AM, climbed the first difficult ice pitch on M-16 by 07:19 AM, and then traversed left on new terrain into a left-leaning ramp. After a pitch and a half up the ramp, they traversed left again and climbed an exceptionally difficult unclimbed waterfall, which brought them to a long, steep snow gully. They climbed the gully and then traversed over a snow rib farther left into a large snow basin that is drained by the icefall route, "Life by the Drop". They climbed up the snow basin to the south ridge, which they ascended to the summit. Their summit photos were taken at 12:41 PM and 12:44 PM. The last photo on Auer's camera places them rappelling into the top of the snow basin at 13:27 PM. Between 13:27 PM and 13:58 PM, Roskelley, Auer, and Lama were caught in an avalanche and carried to their death, as they descended the basin un-roped and before they reached their ascent traverse. Reaching the traverse would have placed them out of the basin and taken them to safety. A photograph taken from the highway by Canmore climber Quentin Roberts shows a large avalanche swept the route above "Life by the Drop" at 13:58 PM. The men's bodies were recovered from an avalanche cone below that route. The shallow layer of snow covering their bodies indicates the avalanche was either a localized break in the snow gully of the basin they were descending or created by a cornice falling into their descent gully as the cause of the accident.

Professional mixed-martial artist Michael Chiesa dedicated his win at UFC 239 to Roskelley's memory.
