= Jim Wickwire =

American climber

- Born: James Wickwire; June 8, 1940 (age 86)
- Education: Gonzaga University; Gonzaga University School of Law
- Occupation: Attorney

Jim Wickwire (born June 8, 1940) is the first American to summit K2, the second highest mountain in the world (summit at 8,611 m (28,251 ft)). Wickwire is also known for surviving an overnight solo bivouac on K2 at an elevation above 27,000 ft or 8,200 m; considered "one of the most notorious bivouacs in mountaineering history".

== Early life ==
Wickwire was raised in the small town of Ephrata, Washington, by James and Dorothy Wickwire. He played football for Ephrata High School and Columbia Basin College in Pasco, Washington, where he was part of an unbeaten team in 1961 that was later invited to the Junior Rose Bowl. Wickwire chose to leave football and enroll in Gonzaga University, where he graduated law school. He trained and has practiced as a lawyer.

== Mount Rainier and the Willis Wall ==
Wickwire made several pioneering ascents of Mount Rainier's 3,600 feet (1,097 m) foot Willis Wall in the 1960s and 1970s, which had remained unclimbed until 1961. His ascent in 1963, was the first up the wall's East Rib. In 1970, he completed the first winter ascent of the Willis Wall. Wickwire's other ascents of the Willis Wall occurred in 1971 and 1974.

== K2: summit and bivouac ==
K2 has been termed the "Savage Mountain" in writings about its high altitude climbing. Its dangers include notorious weather conditions, stretches of technical climbing on rock and ice, marked cliff exposures, and enormous, high-altitude serac. It has the second-highest fatality rate among the "eight thousanders" for those who climb it; of every four people who have reached the summit, one has died trying.

When Wickwire finally climbed K2 for the first time, seven climbers had already died there. His first attempt on K2 was in a 1975 expedition that broke down in disputes and never got above 22,000 feet (6,700 m).

Wickwire reached the summit of K2 with Louis Reichardt on September 6, 1978. The pair took photos on the summit, and then Reichardt started his descent immediately because he had made the climb without supplemental oxygen. Wickwire lingered a little longer, with the intention of catching up. Upon his descent it was beginning to get dark however, and Wickwire did not have a headlamp. Concerned about being able to move safely in the dark, he decided to spend the night where he was, which was below the summit but above 27,000 ft or 8,200 m. Wickwire had done bivouacs before and knew he just needed to gut it out until daylight, which was risky because of the thin air and severe cold. Risks included hypoxia, hypothermia, frostbite, cerebral edema, pulmonary edema, and falling.

Wickwire did not have a tent, sleeping bag, or water. His oxygen ran out halfway through the night, and his gas stove became inoperable. His only protection, other than his immediate winter clothing, was a thin nylon bivvy sack, which is uninsulated but windproof and helps to retain body heat. He shivered uncontrollably from the extreme cold (estimated to be -35 °F) and kept slowly sliding down the slope. He was forced to get out of his sack to remedy the problem and discovered that he was at risk of sliding over an edge that rolled off to drop 10,000 ft or 3,000 m below. "No one had ever survived a solo bivouac above twenty-seven thousand feet".

Fortunately, I had been through enough miserable bivouacs to know that the night would end. I also think that having reached the summit was a critical element in my survival, it gave me an adrenaline rush and great sense of satisfaction that saw me through the night. The hardest thing was trying to get moving in the morning. By then I was pretty far gone. What motivated me were thoughts of my wife and children.

— Jim Wickwire on surviving a bivouac on K2

The next morning, John Roskelley and Rick Ridgeway found him continuing down while on their way to the summit. Wickwire lost parts of two toes and underwent lung surgery due to blood clots on his lungs (pulmonary emboli); he also caught pneumonia and pleurisy. The Pakistani army helicoptered Wickwire right from the glacier at the bottom of the mountain, and Wickwire immediately underwent lung surgery. The surgeon expressed uncertainty about Wickwire's ever climbing at high altitudes again. Nevertheless, Wickwire continued high-altitude climbing a couple of years later, climbing the slopes of Alaska's Denali in preparation for his climbing expedition on Mount Everest.

== Crevasse on Denali ==
In 1981, Wickwire was traversing a glacier on Denali, with 25-year-old Mount Rainier guide Chris Kerrebrock in the lead. They were roped together and dragging a sled. Glaciers often have deep crevasses, which can be concealed by thin layers of snow. A crevasse opened up beneath Kerrebrock who fell in headfirst, pulling Wickwire and the sled in on top of him, since they were roped together. Wickwire was able to slowly climb out with an ice axe but was unable to rescue Kerrebrock, who was alive but wedged in tightly, still wearing his backpack and upside down. (Kerrebrock couldn't feel his hand when Wickwire touched it.) Wickwire had broken his shoulder, but slowly scaled the ice walls of the crevasse, six inches at a time, with his ice axe and crampons. Once upon the rim surface he attempted to dislodge Kerrebrock, who was still very much conscious, by pulling forcefully on the rope. Wickwire then descended on rope anchored to a snow picket, and attempted moving Kerrebrock's tightly wedged backpack from within the crevasse, but all efforts were futile. Resigned to Kerrebrock's fate, the two men said their goodbyes. Kerrebrock subsequently died late in the night. (Kerrebrock had instructed Wickwire to leave it up to his father to decide whether to leave his body in the crevasse or not. Wickwire led park rangers to the site, and they extracted Kerrebrock from the location.)

Upon getting down from the mountain, which took several days and was fraught with more crevasse dangers, Wickwire was burdened by his guilt for months for being unable to save Kerrebrock. He thought about quitting the upcoming expedition to Mount Everest stating, "the furthest thought in my mind was Everest at that point". His wife convinced him to think about it for a length of time before deciding one way or the other, so there would be no regrets down the road. Wickwire heeded his wife's advice, and in 1982, he was climbing Everest's slopes with the planned group for the expedition.

== North face Everest attempts ==
Wickwire made four (unsuccessful) attempts on the north side of Mount Everest, in: 1982, 1984, 1993, and 2003. During the 1982 expedition, Wickwire formed a relationship with female climber Marty Hoey. While ascending Everest, one day Wickwire and Hoey were taking a brief rest on a slope within a steep and icy couloir at 26,000 ft (7,900 m). When the two climbers above needed more rope Hoey got up to allow Wickwire to move into position to ascend. As she did so, something went wrong. As Wickwire explains:

In the midst of lifting my pack I heard a sudden pinging sound and turned my head to see Marty pitching backward, head-down the icy slope. I yelled, "Grab the rope!" Though she rolled onto her side and reached out, she missed the fixed rope, sliding past it just as it curved away toward the edge of the Great Coulier. I watched in shock and disbelief as she slid at an ever increasing speed, disappearing into a tunnel of mist, over a huge ice cliff, and onto the glacier six thousand feet below. Not once did she cry out.

Wickwire looked back at the fixed rope and saw Hoey's open climbing waist harness still attached via a jumar. He couldn't compute at first what had happened, but later realized that her harness strap had not held, because Hoey hadn't threaded "the end of her belt back through the buckle (the only way to assure it would not come loose)". Retracing the route down, Wickwire found one of her crampons, but her body was lost below in the mountain's bergschrund. After Hoey's death, the three remaining climbers of the expedition's first summit team turned back.

== Other notable attempts ==
In 1995, Jim Wickwire, John Roskelley, Tim Macartney-Snape, Stephen Venables, and Charlie Porter attempted a new route on Monte Sarmiento, on the western shores of Tierra del Fuego. Wickwire and Porter were injured on the climb and did not reach the summit with Roskelley, Macartney-Snape, and Venables.

== Personal life ==
At the time of Kerrebrock's death, Wickwire had been working for 20 years to become "one of the world's most accomplished mountain climbers".

After his adventures came to a halt, Wickwire was still able to return to have a relationship with his wife, children, and now his grandchildren. His wife had supported him during the years that he was a risk taker in the mountains.

Wickwire is now a retired attorney living in Seattle, Washington.

== In media ==
=== Books ===
- Wickwire has published an autobiography, Addicted to Danger: A Memoir about Affirming Life in the Face of Death (with Dorothy C. Bullitt).

=== Film ===
The film K2 (1991) is based very loosely on Wickwire and Reichardt's 1978 K2 summit; there are significant differences between the film and reality.
