= Sue Macartney-Snape =

British illustrator (born 1957)

- Born: Tanganyika Territory
- Occupation: Caricaturist
- Notable work: Social Stereotypes (column)
- Relatives: Tim Macartney-Snape

Sue Macartney-Snape (born 1957) is a Tanzanian-born caricaturist who emigrated to the United Kingdom via Australia. She is best known for her illustrations for The Telegraph's Social Stereotypes column, written by Victoria Mather, which ran for fourteen years. Macartney-Snape's works have been compared by Nicholas Foulkes to P G Wodehouse, Beryl Cook, Henry Mayo Bateman and Osbert Lancaster. She was the recipient of the Pont Award in 2004.

== Early life ==
Her father was born in 1896, and fought in the First World War. He met Macartney-Snape's much younger mother due to a shared interest in stooking hay; he left his then wife and the new couple travelled to Tanzania to establish a family there. Her mother was a florist who supplied arrangements to hotels in Daar-es-Salaam, and her younger brother Tim Macartney-Snape was the first Australian to summit Everest. After independence, the family moved to Australia.

== Career ==
Initially trained as a botanical artist, Macartney-Snape's first exhibition of caricatures was held in Melbourne; she subsequently emigrated to the United Kingdom. An early venture was The Upper Crust Calendar, which was a calendar featuring Macartney-Snape's caricatures which was popular with the British upper-classes and sold in Harrods and at the General Trading Company in 1985. In 1993 several of her works were used by English author Jilly Cooper to structure the novella Araminta's Wedding, which satirised upper-class life and inheritance. She has also created new cover illustrations for the novels of Anthony Powell.

Best known for her illustrations for The Telegraph's Social Stereotypes column, written by Victoria Mather, which ran for fourteen years. Several volumes of collated columns were published as stand alone volumes, the first of which was 1996's Absolutely Typical. Ben Dowell, reviewing the volume for the Manchester Evening News, described the illustrations as "cruel" and criticised how the writing "perpetuated social divisions". This was followed by Absolutely Typical Too in 1997, which The Independent reviewed as "unfunny". In contrast The Grimsby Evening Telegraph reviewed the volume as one "that turns character assassination into an art form".

== Reception ==
Macartney-Snape's works have been compared by Nicholas Foulkes to P G Wodehouse, Beryl Cook, Henry Mayo Bateman and Osbert Lancaster. Similarities were observed by satirical artist Annie Tempest between a character in Araminta's Wedding and her own work. One bespoke commission for Barbara Amiel, of caricature of her by Macartney-Snape was priced at £10,000 in 2003. Other commissions were for Glyndebourne and the Metropolitan Opera. According to The Telegraph some of her caricatures are inspired by Albrecht Dürer. A copy of the 2006 book The Smelly Dog is in the National Trust's collection at Plas Newydd.

== Recognition ==
- Pont Award (2004)

== Selected works ==
- Araminta's Wedding written by Jilly Cooper (Methuen, 1993)
- Absolutely Typical with Victoria Mather (Methuen, 1996)
- Absolutely Typical Too with Victoria Mather (Methuen, 1997)
- The Party Blonde with Victoria Mather (Methuen, 2000)
- The Embarrassing Parents with Victoria Mather (Methuen, 2002)
- The Appalling Guests with Victoria Mather (Methuen, 2003)
- The Perfect Family with Victoria Mather (Methuen, 2004)
- The Mid-Life Crisis with Victoria Mather (Methuen, 2005)
- The Smelly Dog with Victoria Mather (Methuen, 2006)
- The Wicked Teenager with Victoria Mather (Methuen, 2007)
- There'll Always Be an England with Victoria Mather (Methuen, 2010)
