= John Dewey High School =

Public school in New York City

- Logo of the school

Location
- 50 Ave X Brooklyn, New York 11223; United States; 40.5877°N 73.9814°W

Information
- Type: Public
- Motto: Dewin' It Right!
- Established: 1969
- School district: New York City Department of Education
- School number: K540
- CEEB code: 330746
- NCES School ID: 360015204312
- Principal: Heather Adelle
- Teaching staff: 157.69 (on an FTE basis)
- Grades: 9-12
- Enrollment: 2,150 (2022–2023)
- Student to teacher ratio: 13.63
- Campus: City: Large
- Colors: Red and Gray
- Athletics conference: PSAL
- Mascot: Dragons
- Website: www.johndeweyhighschool.org

John Dewey High School (JDHS) is a public high school in Gravesend, Brooklyn, New York City. It was founded and based on the educational principles of John Dewey. The school, under the supervision of the New York City Department of Education, was named a New American High School in 2000.

The school opened on September 8, 1969, with 1,130 freshmen and sophomores. It grew in the next two academic years to include juniors and seniors. There currently are over 2,000 students. It counts among its alumni producer and director Larry Charles, filmmaker Spike Lee, Pulitzer Prize winner Donald Margulies, radio personality David Brody, photographer Gregory Crewdson, WWE wrestler Jayson Paul (aka JTG), scientist Robert Sapolsky, astrologer-journalist Eric Francis, news correspondent Ray Suarez, and film actress Michelle Ye.

John Dewey High School was also the first "educational-option" school in New York City, in which applicants were admitted through academic groups based on their citywide test scores: high, middle, and low-achieving. Dewey selected students from each of the three groups. Other schools in the city, such as Edward R. Murrow High School, Murry Bergtraum High School and Norman Thomas High School have since opened, following Dewey's "ed-op" system of admissions.

== Academics ==
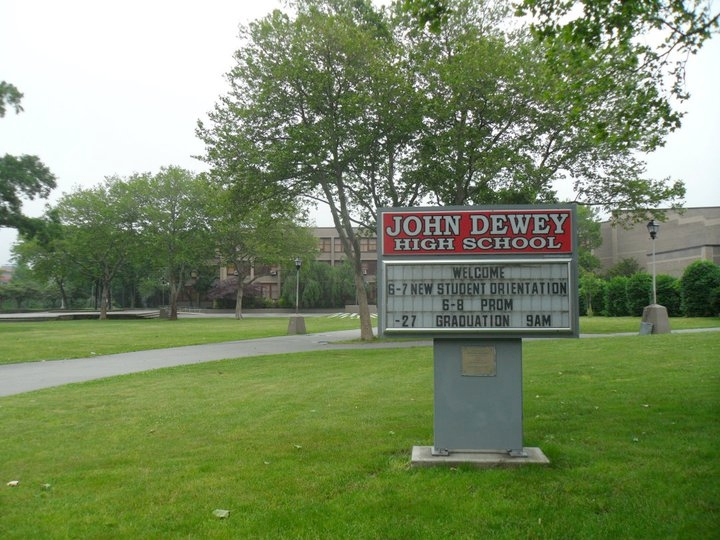
The campus entrance

John Dewey High School used to have an innovative educational model designed to mirror that of a college experience. It has since become more of a traditional school, while still offering specialized electives and CTE programs within six academies/small learning communities: Arts, Business & Hospitality, Law, Pre-Med, STEM, and Teaching & Learning.

Each academic year was split into four cycles. In order to graduate, students had to pass a certain number of classes in each department. For example, each student needed to take 16 cycles of English: 8 literature classes, 4 writing classes, 2 communication classes, and 2 electives. For Social Studies, each student had to take 16 cycles of classes. Students needed 8 global history courses, 4 American history, 2 economic classes, and 2 government classes. Mathematics required 12 cycles, and each student needed to complete Math A. The Science Department required students to take 12 cycles of classes. The foreign language options still offered today are Spanish and Chinese. When a student chose a preferred language, the course had to be taken for either 4 or 12 cycles.

Art and music were important in the Dewey curriculum, a student was able to take photography, music, or film classes. Each student had to take 2 cycles of each. As in all high schools in New York City, Dewey offers health education and physical education. Each student needed to take 14 cycles of physical education and 2 cycles of health, totaling 16 cycles. There were, and still are, many electives and extra curricular activities, such as dance, business education, technology, culinary, and health careers and occupations. There was also a COOP program for senior students. Dewey was once credited for being a college-like high school because classes were not restricted by the students' year, and for its campus.

=== Advanced Placement Courses ===
John Dewey High School offers over 17 Advanced Placement courses, one of the highest for New York City public high schools. These include courses in

- AP Biology
- AP Calculus AB
- AP Calculus BC
- AP Chemistry
- AP Chinese Language and Culture
- AP Computer Science A
- AP English Language
- AP English Literature
- AP US Government and Politics
- AP Art History
- AP Physics B
- AP Microeconomics
- AP Macroeconomics
- AP Psychology
- AP Spanish
- AP Statistics
- AP United States History
- AP World History

=== Academy of Finance ===
John Dewey High School housed the first Academy of Finance, which was started by Sandy Weill in 1982. The Academy of Finance prepared students for post-secondary education and careers through a theme-based, contextualized curriculum approach.

The Academy of Finance introduced high school students to the broad career opportunities of the financial services industry. One of three member programs of the National Academy Foundation, it operated as a small learning community and is now located in more than 275 high schools nationwide.

Each student was allowed to apply for the Academy of Finance. During the sophomore year, a student who was interested in joining submitted an application and waited for an interview with the Academy coordinator. The Academy of Finance was only available to juniors and seniors who have applied during their sophomore year.

This program is no longer available.

=== Council For Unity ===
John Dewey High School is home to the first Council For Unity, a national non-profit organization founded in 1975 Robert DeSena, who was a Dewey teacher at that time. Its mission is to establish racial harmony, respect, peace, and an end to violence in schools and the surrounding community.

The Council for Unity network currently is at more than sixty schools and community centers in New York City, Long Island, Texas, and California. There is a college chapter at the University of Vermont, and an international chapter in Balti, Moldova.

=== National Honor Society ===
Formerly known as ARISTA, the scholastic honor society is served through its National Honor Society chapter. Applicants must have achieved an overall scholastic average of 90 or above. The student must also have a record of service performed each cycle (term) in a school facility. In the early decades of its operation, Dewey had no letter or number grades, and there was no school-wide academic honor society.

== Incidents ==
From 2015–2016, there was a grade fixing scandal in which students were passed along easily to boost graduation rates. It was part of a credit recovery program to avoid school closure.

In 2017, there was also a threat made by a teen of a mass shooting of the school on Facebook. The comment was reported and he was taken into custody afterwards.

== School facilities ==
One of the many innovative features that existed in Dewey were the learning centers, which were commonly called "resource centers." These are located centrally between five or six classrooms, and used to be staffed by a teacher and a paraprofessional. Each major department had one — English & Literature, Mathematics, Social Studies, Science, Foreign Language, Music, Art and the Universal Resource Center. For each band (class period), subject teachers who were designated resource centers were there to facilitate students in academics. Students who were free would go to resource centers for assistance in homework, projects, or independent study, or to socialize with others. These "resource centers" have since been underutilized and are not used for the same purpose.

Unlike the majority of New York City public schools, Dewey does not share its campus with any other school. The campus includes the main building, a statue as well as stone plaques to honor alumni. The school has a football, soccer, lacrosse, and softball field which is utilized in various ways. The school also has an outdoor tennis field and two parking lots.

The library has a collections of more than 30,000 books, magazines, and about 12 computers for student, parent, and faculty use.

Most classrooms are outfitted with 2 to 40 computers or laptops. Classrooms are also equipped with Smart Boards, Promethean Boards and Elmo Projectors.

== Middle School Annex ==
On May 30, 2024, the school started construction of an annex that will host 553 middle school students for the 2026-2027 school year. It includes 20 classrooms, art and music rooms, two science labs, a gym, an exercise room, and a library. The building contains three floors and is behind the main school. It officially opened on September 8, 2026.

== Extracurricular activities ==
The Student Organization facilitates clubs in organizing and fundraising. John Dewey High School offers clubs such as: Anime, Asian, Art-Ink, Christian Culture, Ceramics, Classic Rock, Chess, Dance, Diversity, Fashion Design, Finance, Gardening Club, The Video Game Club, Cinema Club, Key Club, Hebrew Culture, Award Winning Robotics Team, Math, Marine Science, Muslim Culture, Modeling, Model Congress, Sci-Fi, Gay-Straight Alliance, Soccer, and Softball. New clubs are created every year.

There are annual events throughout the campus and the school, such as the Club Rush, International Night, Country Fair (now "Dewey Spirit Day" with games, inflatable balloons, caricatures, music, food, sports, and other activities are held all over the school), Spirit Weeks, and Blood Drive (students 16 or older have the option to donate blood to those in need).

During the 2016–2017 school year, John Dewey High School students participate in SING!, an annual student-run musical production which is exclusive to New York City public high schools.

=== Team #333 ===
Dewey's nationally ranked and award-winning robotics team, Team #333, also known as The Megalodons, has participated in various national and regional competitions. The team avidly participates in "FIRST Robotics," an international competition that attracts schools with robotics teams. The team has also been featured in various local newspapers, including the New York Daily News.

Their efforts have resulted in beating some of the top high schools in the country and some of the specialized high schools in New York City, such as Brooklyn Tech and Stuyvesant High School. Their accomplishments have led to visits from the previous New York City school chancellor Dennis Walcott and astronaut Gregory Olsen. The team has also participated in the opening pitch for the Brooklyn Cyclones.

The team originated as a small after-school club and gradually grew into a highly-selective program with its own classes and curriculum, and currently consists of over fifty members who work during and after school in an industrial arts shop located in the school.

=== Sports ===
For more than 30 years, Dewey did not have varsity sports teams. The lack of inter-school sports competition grew out of its educational design, meant to de-emphasize competition, winning and losing, and to encourage achievement for its own sake. However, the school has intramural athletic programs, in which students can play various sports for recreation.

However, starting in the 2011–2012 school year, the school changed its stance on competition and competitive sports with other public high schools began, following a majority vote for it. It started with boys' and girls' soccer teams and girls' basketball, cross country, and cheerleading. The team name for all sports is The Dewey Dragons. Teams have expanded to include lacrosse, boys' and girls' softball, boys' and girls' tennis, and girls' volleyball.

== Student demographics ==
Ethnic Group	2012-13	2013-14	2014-15
Asian/Native Hawaiian and Other Pacific Islander	33%	34%	36%
Black or African American	25%	26%	29%
Hispanic or Latino	21%	20%	20%
White (Non-Hispanic)	13%	13%	14%
American Indian or Alaska Native	0.4%	0.4%	0.5%
Native Hawaiian/Other Pacific Islander	0.2%	0.3%	0.3%

== Awards ==
In 1999, John Dewey High School was one of ten schools nationwide to receive the 10th Annual Businessweek Award for Instructional Innovation for incorporating technology into the classroom. The award and grant of $1,500 was presented at Businessweek's annual conference in San Francisco.

In 2000, John Dewey High School was named a New American High School for serving as a model for schools nationwide that have achieved high levels of success, and was showcased nationally at the White House.

In 2003, John Dewey High School was named as one of 209 successful schools that then-chancellor Joel L. Klein exempted from the citywide uniform curriculum.

In 2007, John Dewey High School was named one of America's Top 500 High Schools by U.S. News & World Report.

In 2008 and 2009, Newsweek named John Dewey High School one of America's Top 6% of high schools in its rankings, citing "how hard staffs work to challenge students with Advanced Placement college-level courses and tests."

In 2010, John Dewey High School's short film produced by the Film Class titled "A Block From Home" which was about an innocent victim who was caught in cross fire gun violence nearby Sheepshead Bay High School and takes on the progressive healing and the will to forge ahead. It was a part of Tribeca Film Festival in the Our City My Story event.

In 2013, U.S. News & World Report awarded John Dewey High School a silver medal for ranking as one of America's Top High Schools, and for ranking #127 in New York State.

In 2015, Niche named John Dewey High School as the fifth best high school in Brooklyn, the second best high school in the New York City Department of Education's District 21, top 100 most diverse schools in New York State, and was given an "Overall Niche Grade" of a B+, the only school in the district to achieve this grade.

In 2016, Niche gave John Dewey High School an "Overall Niche Grade" of an A−.

== Notable appearances ==
- The school is shown during the chase scene of the Academy Award-winning movie The French Connection, which was largely filmed on a train that was parked at the Bay 50th Street station, located right outside the school, which at that time was served by the New York City Subway's B train.
- Actor Michael J. Fox was the guest speaker for the Class of 1984, he was also given an honorary high school diploma.
- Dr. Ruth Westheimer, sex therapist, professor, author, and talk show host, was the guest speaker at graduation for the Class of 1985.
- First Lady Hillary Clinton visited in April 2000 as part of the "Principals For a Day" program.
- Radio personality David Brody from Z100 and Elvis Duran and the Morning Show was the guest speaker at graduation on June 26, 2012. Brody graduated from John Dewey High School in 1983.

== Notable alumni ==
The "Key to Knowledge" statue in front of John Dewey High School on the campus.

- Imam Johari Abdul-Malik, imam at Dar-Ul Hijrah Islamic Center (attended Dewey as Winslow Seale)
- David Brody (comedy writer and former radio producer) for Z100 NY Elvis Duran and the Morning Show
- Larry Charles, television/film writer, director, producer
- Gregory Crewdson, modern artist/photographer
- Eric Francis, investigative reporter and astrologer (attended Dewey as Eric Coppolino)
- Elliot Goldenthal (Class of 1971), composer
- Jerry Goldstein (Class of 1988), physicist
- Eric Gonzalez, Kings County District Attorney
- Pamela Harris (Class of 1977), former New York state assemblywoman
- Adam Kidan, businessman and lawyer
- Arthur Lander, biologist
- Spike Lee (Class of 1975), actor, director, producer, screenwriter
- Danny Leiner (Class of 1980), movie director
- Doris Ling-Cohan, New York State Supreme Court Justice
- Nadine Macaluso, psychologist, former model, and ex-wife of Jordan Belfort
- Michael Mandel, chief economist, BusinessWeek Magazine
- Donald Margulies, Pulitzer Prize winning-playwright
- Angie Martinez, radio personality
- Prince Nana, sports entertainer, actor
- John Ortiz, actor
- Geoffrey Owens, actor
- Monica Owusu-Breen, television producer and screenwriter
- Jayson Paul, professional wrestler, known by his ring name JTG
- Stacey Prussman (Class of 1988) comedian, 2021 New York City mayoral candidate
- Frank Pugliese, playwright and television writer
- Colin Quinn, comedian and television personality
- Johnny Reinhard, composer, bassoonist, author, and conductor
- Domenic M. Recchia, Jr. (Class of 1977), New York City Council member
- Stephen C. Robinson (Class of 1975), United States Attorney for the District of Connecticut (1998–2001) and United States District Judge in the Southern District of New York (2003–2010)
- Robert Sapolsky (Class of 1974), scientist
- Chris Matthew Sciabarra (Class of 1977), American political theorist
- Barry Sobel (Class of 1977), comedian and actor
- Brandon Steiner (Class of 1977), sports memorabilia marketer
- Ray Suarez (Class of 1974), journalist and author
- Michelle Ye, actress
