= Everything bagel =

Bagel with a wide range of toppings

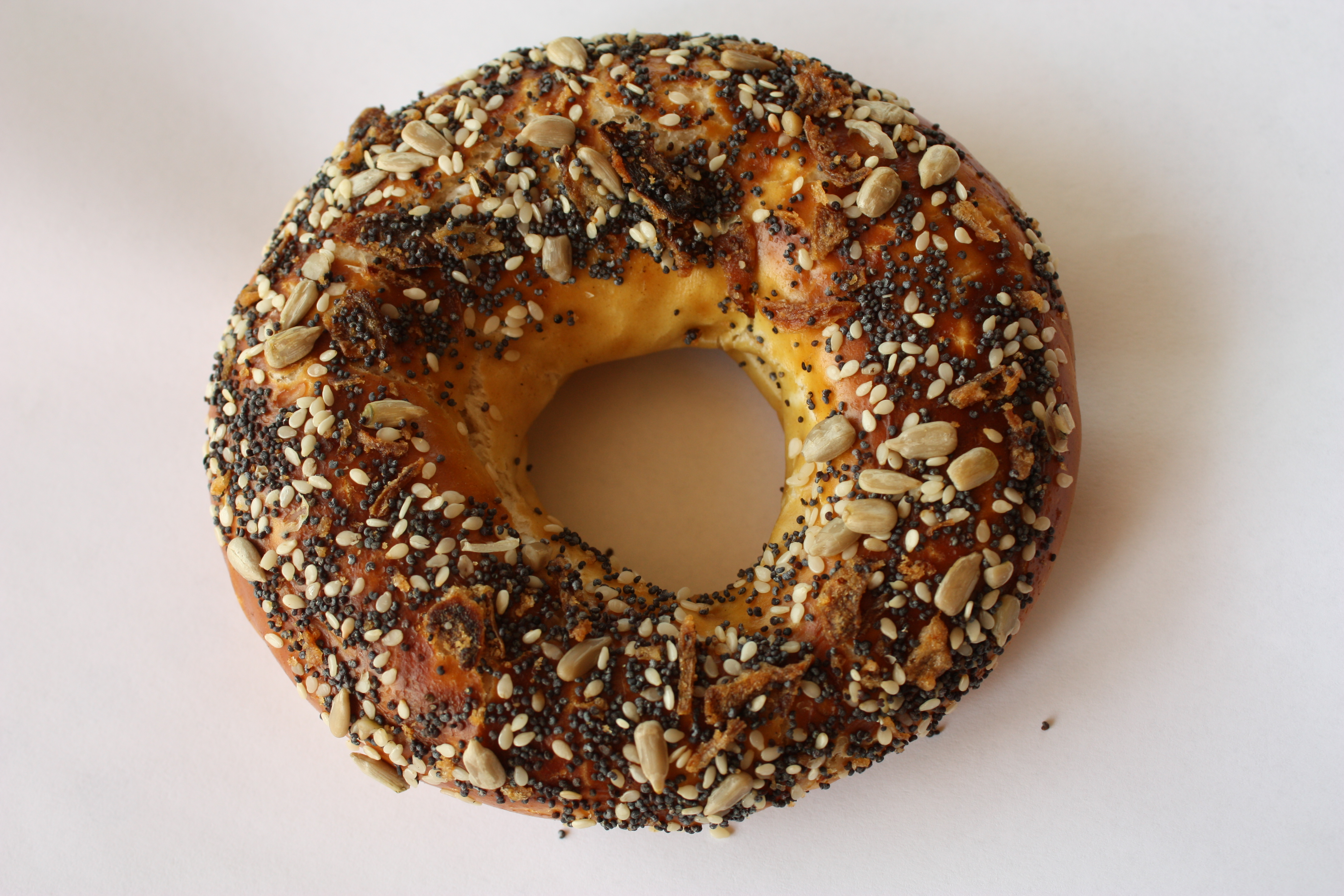
- The everything bagel is made with a variety of toppings.
- Type: Bagel
- Place of origin: United States
- Main ingredients: wheat dough; caraway seeds; garlic; onion; poppy seeds; salt; sesame seeds

An everything bagel is a type of bagel baked with a mix of toppings. The exact ingredients vary, but recipes often include garlic flakes, onion flakes, poppy seeds, sesame seeds and kosher salt. The bagels are made with regular dough, and the name is independent of additional fillings such as cream cheese.

The everything bagel inspired the creation of other food items with similar toppings, including bagel chips, croissants, rolls, roti, pasta, and mixed nuts. Pre-made mixes of everything bagel seasoning are also available.

Many bakeries and fast-casual restaurants offer the everything bagel. Its origins are disputed, but it was likely first created sometime between 1973 and 1980.

== Origin ==
The origin of the everything bagel is disputed. A 1977 article in Newsday on where to eat in Syosset, New York, noted that at Bagel Master, "for those who can never decide if they want plain, salt, poppy seed, sesame seed, garlic or onion, there's something called the everything bagel, which is topped with all of them."

David Gussin claims he invented it sometime around 1980: while sweeping up leftover bagel toppings from the oven, Gussin saved them in a bin and convinced the store owner to make bagels with them. He concurs that others might have previously invented the concept but insists that he coined the name "everything bagel".

Others who have claimed to have invented the everything bagel include American restaurateur Joe Bastianich and sports marketer Brandon Steiner. In his blog, Seth Godin said he worked in a bagel factory that produced everything bagels two years before Gussin. Brandon Steiner, who believes his invention at a bakery in 1973 predates the others, wrote in a 2016 blog post:

One night I was screwing around with different combinations of toppings – sesame, salt, poppy, onion and garlic – making braids, onion flats, and other unorthodox concoctions. Then, after a while, I had the thought to throw all the toppings on a bagel at once. That’s how I invented the everything bagel. This was 1973; I was 14.

== In popular culture ==
In the 2022 film Everything Everywhere All at Once, an everything bagel is a plot element as a black hole filled with literally everything in the film's multiverse.
