= Council For Unity =

American non-profit organization

Council for Unity is a national non-profit organization founded in 1975 at John Dewey High School, in Brooklyn, New York, United States. Council for Unity provides curriculum in schools, and programs in correctional facilities. "Its aim is to give kids a better way of life and keep them out of trouble, including away from gangs."

Council for Unity network comprises 60 schools and community centers in New York City, Long Island, Boys and Girls Clubs of America in Texas and California. Council for Unity also has a college chapter at The University of Vermont and has gone international with its chapter in Balti High School in Balti, Moldova.

== History ==
Robert J. DeSena, a teacher at John Dewey High School, founded Council for Unity in 1975. Mr. Desena brought leaders of different gangs together to bring peace to the school. These African American, Latino, Asian American, Jewish and Italian American leaders put a stop to the violence, and created new friendships. However that was not enough. They wanted to create a program that would promote respect for different cultures throughout the whole school. To do this, new students had to be recruited from all ethnic and racial groups.

A racial incident occurred in 1979 that changed the direction of Council for Unity forever. A conflict between Italian Americans and African Americans took place across the street from the school. Many young people were hurt, and the fight threatened to expand to the Dewey students. Immediate action had to be done, so Council mediated the conflict. Peace was restored, but tensions were still high. Council decided to produce a play about the incident titled: "A Lifting of Hands", which was written by Mr. DeSena. It was performed in the school auditorium. Community leaders, business leaders, politicians, and students from many schools were invited to attend the performance. The audience was extremely moved that requests for other Council chapters poured in from all over the city. At this point in Council's history our leaders realized that mediation was not enough. Something had to be done to prevent violence—not just react to it. It was then that the Four Pillars of Council for Unity were born.

When these four pillars were formed, Council began its expansion into elementary schools, junior high schools, and other high schools besides Dewey. Instead of just bringing students together in one school, it was possible to bring many schools together.

=== Violence ===
When a community is faced with violence, Council for Unity provides its anti-gang, violence reduction models to schools and community centers. The child's need for family, safety, self-esteem and responsibility are met through the application of our customized curriculum, obviating the tendency to join anti-social peer groups. By empowering alienated youth to address the problems that plague them, by teaching them values and democratic approaches to solving problems, their sense of impotency dissipates. They become part of the solutions to the issues that beset them and, in turn, become productive citizens.

=== Racial tensions ===
When a community is confronted with racial or ethnic tension, Council for Unity applies its unity model to bring conflicting groups together. Agendas are established that focus on attacking problems rather than individuals. Participants are then directed to seek a common good that benefits all parties.
