= Louis Reichardt =

American neuroscientist and mountaineer

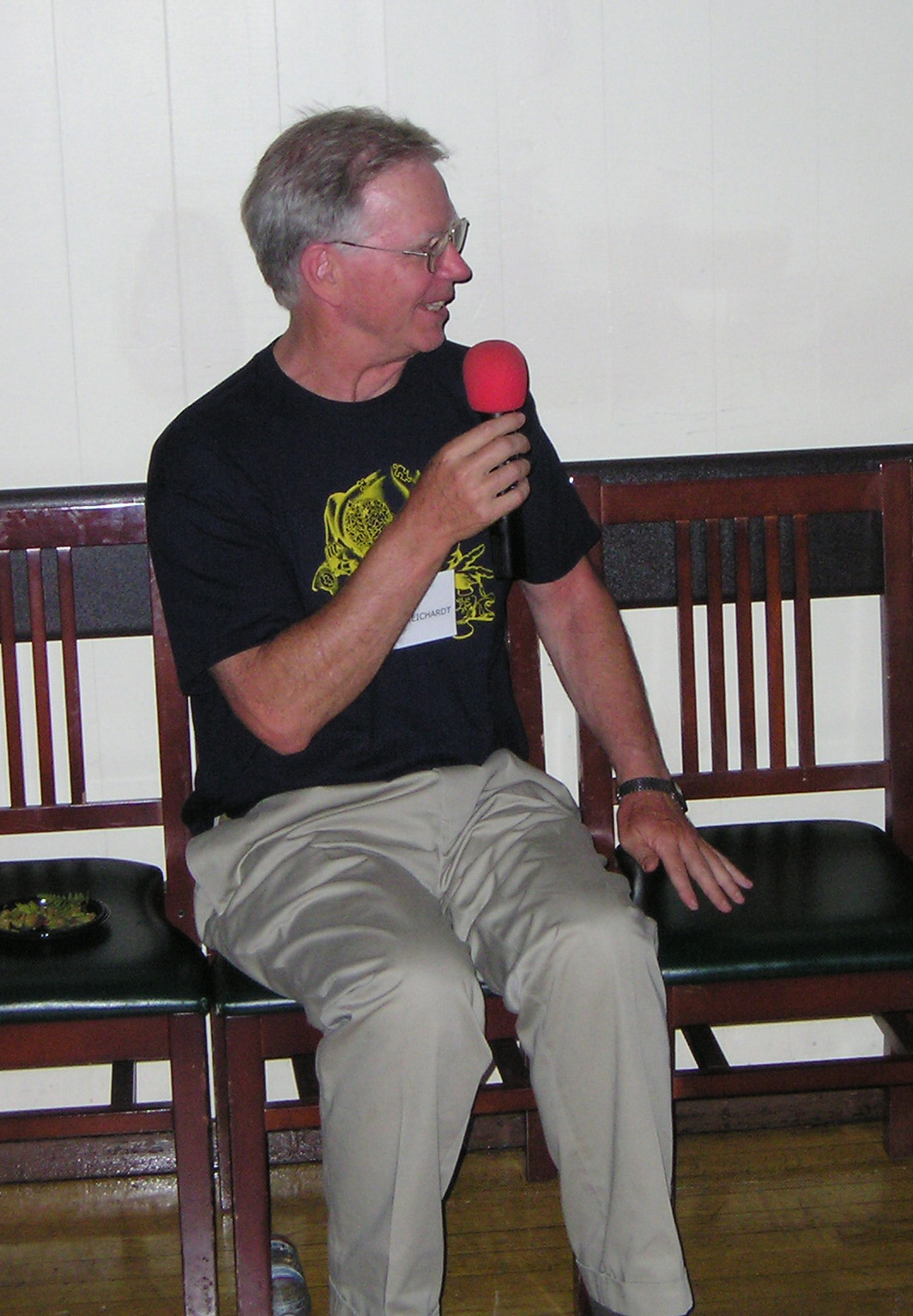
Louis Reichardt at the UCSF Neuroscience Graduate Program retreat in Asilomar

Louis French Reichardt (born June 4, 1942) is a noted American neuroscientist and mountaineer, the first American to summit both Everest and K2. He was also director of the Simons Foundation Autism Research Initiative, the largest non-federal supporter of scientific research into autism spectrum disorders and is an emeritus professor of physiology and biochemistry/biophysics at UCSF, where he studied neuroscience. The character of Harold Jameson, U.C.S.F. biophysicist and mountaineer in the film K2, is based on Reichardt, though the events of his actual 1978 K2 attempt with Jim Wickwire bear little resemblance to the plot of the film.

== Notable ascents and expeditions ==
- 1968 Abruzzi Route (substantial variation), Mount Saint Elias, Yukon/Alaska. Fifth ascent of peak with Paul Gerhard
- 1973 Northeast Ridge Dhaulagiri, Nepal. Third ascent of peak. Summit reached with John Roskelley and Nawang Samden, May 12, 1973.
- 1976: Summit team with John Roskelley and Jim States on Nanda Devi. Despite extreme adversity, the three were successful in reaching the summit. Tragically Nanda Devi Unsoeld died at high camp due to complications of a stomach virus and acute mountain sickness.
- 1978 Northeast Ridge/East Face and Abruzzi Ridge K2, Pakistan. New route and third ascent of peak, First summiter without supplemental oxygen. Summit reached with Jim Wickwire on September 6, 1978. John Roskelley and Rick Ridgeway reached the summit the next day.
- 1980: Member of the first American expedition granted permission to climb in Tibet, an expedition sponsored by the American Alpine Club to Minya Konka, led by Lance Owens and Andrew Harvard.
- 1981: As climbing leader of the 1981 American expedition to Everest, led by Richard Blum, Lou Reichardt faced what must have seemed an almost insurmountable task, to chart a path up the unclimbed East face of Everest, the Kangshung Face. And for that year at least the Kangshung Face remained unclimbed. The expedition, though well financed, was torn by strife, bad weather, threat of avalanche, and illness - and the attempt at the summit abandoned.
- 1983: Lou Reichardt, Kim Momb, and Carlos Buhler become the first to summit the Kangshung Face of Mount Everest

In its September 1986 issue, Backpacker magazine described Reichardt as a "climbing gorilla," able to "walk out of the lab and climb like an animal on no training at all."

== American Alpine Club ==
Reichardt was a director of the American Alpine Club from 1977 to 1980, and served as president from 1995 to 1997.

== Honors and awards ==
Reichardt was awarded the Robert and Miriam Underhill Award by the American Alpine Club in 1993, The David Brower Conservation Award in 1997, and The Angelo Heilprin Citation in 2000. On April 7, 2012, the American Alpine Club inducted Reichardt into its Hall of Mountaineering Excellence at an award ceremony in Golden, Colorado.

== Scientific career ==
Reichardt went to high school at the Midland School. He went on to Harvard University for undergraduate work (1960–1964), was a Fulbright Scholar at St. John's College, Cambridge and received a PhD in biochemistry from Stanford University in 1972. He was a research fellow at the University of Geneva and Harvard Medical School, before becoming a professor at The University of California, San Francisco. From 1988 to 2013, he served as co-director and director of the UCSF Neuroscience program, and from 2013 to 2020 he was director of the Simons Foundation Autism Research Initiative. He continued as an advisor for the foundation until the end of 2020.

Reichardt was an investigator at Howard Hughes Medical Institute (1985–2007). He is a fellow of American Academy of Arts and Sciences. He was a co-founder of the journal Neuron, in 1988, with Lily Jan, A. James Hudspeth, Roger Nicoll, and Zach Hall.

Arthur Lander, the UC Irvine developmental biologist, is one of his eminent students.

== Publications ==
- Reichardt, Louis (1974). "Dhauligiri 1973". American Alpine Journal. 19 (48). New York, NY, USA: American Alpine Club: 1–10. ISBN 0-930410-71-8.
- Reichardt, Louis (1979). "K2: The End of a 40-Year American Quest". American Alpine Journal. 22 (53). New York, NY, USA: American Alpine Club: 1–18. ISSN 0065-6925.
