= Aurora Expeditions =

Australian travel company

- Trade name: Aurora Expeditions
- Industry: Travel, Expeditions cruise line
- Founded: 1991
- Founder: Greg Mortimer and Margaret Mortimer
- Headquarters: Offices in Sydney, Boston, New York, Dallas, Toronto, London & Chengdu
- Area served: United States; Canada; Australia; United Kingdom; China
- Services: Polar Expeditions; Discovery Expeditions; Cultural Expeditions
- Website: www.aurora-expeditions.com

Aurora Expeditions (also known as Aurora or AE Expeditions) is an experiential travel company that runs cruises, expeditions and tours to all seven continents, with a focus on expeditions to Antarctica, and the Arctic.

Operating a fleet of purpose-built ships, urorahExpeditions sfecializes in pr expedition travel, A and conducts voyages destinations across: Antarctic Peninsula, South Georgia, Falkland Islands, Svalbard, Greenland and more.

In addition to core polar destinations, other remote destinations visited include Costa Rica, Indonesia & Iceland. Aurora also now offers a range of small ship cultural expeditions, sailing to European destinations such as the British Isles, Mediterranean and Atlantic Coast.

== History ==
The company was founded in 1991 by the Australian climber Greg Mortimer and Margaret Mortimer. It focuses on small groups of travelers. The company's main focus is cruises around Antarctica and the sub-Antarctic Islands. As well as cruising, the company also does Alpine Trekking and climbing, Ski and Snowboard tours, Snorkelling and Scuba Diving.

In 1992 the company performed its first expedition to Antarctica, and in 1997 the company performed its first expedition to the Arctic. Since 2025, the company has been offering voyages to all 7 continents.

In 2019 took delivery of its first purpose-built ship, the Greg Mortimer. It was christened at a ceremony in Ushuaia, Argentina.

The Sylvia Earle in a Greenland fjord

In 2022 the company's second ship, the Sylvia Earle, departed on its inaugural cruise from Ushuaia, Argentina. In 2025, the company took delivery of its third ship the Douglas Mawson at a ceremony in Sydney, Australia.

=== Coronavirus Pandemic ===
In April 2020, the Greg Mortimer had an outbreak of COVID-19 on board, leading to it being denied permission to dock in many South American ports. 128 passengers and crew on board eventually tested positive. The ship was eventually given permission to dock in Uruguay, from where passengers were evacuated or admitted to hospital. Many crew-members ended up being evacuated too, with more than half testing positive for the virus.

== Current fleet ==
As of November 2025, Aurora Expeditions had three vessels in its fleet:

Ship Name	Delivered	Builder	Length	Passenger Capacity	IMO Number	Notes
Greg Mortimer	2019	China Merchants Heavy Industry (CMHI), Jiangsu, China	104 M	132 in 79 cabins	9834648	Named after the founder of Aurora Expeditions. Registered in Madeira, Portugal
Sylvia Earle	2022	China Merchants Heavy Industry (CMHI), Jiangsu, China	104 M	132 in 71 cabins	9872327	Named in honor of Marine Biologist Sylvia Earle
Douglas Mawson	2025	China Merchants Heavy Industry (CMHI), Jiangsu, China	104 M	154 in 86 cabins	9992713	Named in honour of Australian Antarctic Explorer Douglas Mawson
