= Tim Macartney-Snape =

Australian mountain climber and author

Tim Macartney-Snape AM
Personal information
- Nationality: Australian
- Born: 5 January 1956 (age 70) Iringa, Tanganyika (now Tanzania)
- Website: www.timmacartneysnape.com

Climbing career
- Type of climber: Mountaineer
- First ascents: Mount Everest via the North Face to Norton Couloir route
- Known for: Co-founder of Sea to Summit
- Updated on 17 March 2013

Timothy John Macartney-Snape AM (born 5 January 1956) is an Australian mountaineer and author. On 3 October 1984, Macartney-Snape and Greg Mortimer were the first Australians to reach the summit of Mount Everest. They reached the summit, climbing without supplementary oxygen, via a new route on the North Face (North Face to Norton Couloir). In 1990, Macartney-Snape became the first person to walk and climb from sea level to the top of Mount Everest. Macartney-Snape is also the co-founder of the Sea to Summit range of outdoor and adventure gear and accessories, a guide for adventure travel company World Expeditions, and a founding director and patron of Fix The World.

== Early years ==
Macartney-Snape was born in Iringa, Tanganyika Territory (now Tanzania), where he lived on a farm with his Australian father and Irish mother and sister Sue, an illustrator. In 1967, the family moved to Australia to a farm in North East Victoria. He attended Geelong Grammar School and spent a year at the school's outdoor education campus Timbertop. Macartney-Snape studied at the Australian National University (ANU) in Canberra where he joined the ANU Mountaineering Club (ANUMC). He graduated with a BSc.

== Mountaineering ==
=== Australia and New Zealand ===
Having rock-climbed all over Australia, Macartney-Snape’s first mountaineering experience was two seasons in New Zealand's Southern Alps.

=== Dunagiri ===
In 1978, Macartney-Snape travelled to India as part of the ANUMC's expedition to Dunagiri (7,066 m). After prolonged bad weather he and Lincoln Hall radioed to the Expedition Leader, Peter Cocker, that they wanted to make another attempt on East Dunagiri. Cocker, who was alone at the time at Col Camp on Dunagiri, invited them instead to make a final attempt on Dunagiri. If they could force through a route to the Summit Ridge, they could then return to Col Camp and wait for support to make the summit attempt. Maccartney-Snape and Hall agreed, returned to Dunagiri, and then pushed through to the Summit Ridge. The weather cleared, and after they spent a clear but very cold night out without sleeping bags, Macartney-Snape and Hall made an audacious attempt for the summit of Dunagiri. They were successful and the pair then descended through an electrical storm. Maccartney-Snape reached Col Camp at 10.30 p.m.; however, Hall spent another night out on the mountain. During the night, Cocker ascended the fixed ropes to meet him and accompany him back to Col Camp. This was the first major Himalayan summit climbed by an Australian.

=== Ama Dablam ===
In 1981, Macartney-Snape climbed Ama Dablam (6812m) via the north ridge with a small lightweight team. Macartney-Snape reportedly cited this climb as the inspiration for later climbing Everest: "partway up the North ridge of Ama Dablam he looked over and could see Mt Everest and wondered what it might be like to experience the highest point of the world via a new route in good style".

=== Annapurna II ===
In 1983, Macartney-Snape planned and participated in an expedition to Annapurna II (7,937 m) successfully reaching the summit via the first ascent of the south spur. The descent was delayed by a blizzard and the expedition ran out of food during the last five days. They were reported missing and when the expedition eventually returned they received significant publicity.

=== Mount Everest ===
In July 1984, a small Australian team headed to the north side of Mt Everest where they prepared and ascended an unclimbed route on the north face, climbing without bottled oxygen in a lightweight alpine style and without the help of high altitude porters. On 3 October 1984, climbing in cross-country ski boots as substitutes for his high altitude climbing boots that had been lost in an earlier avalanche, Macartney-Snape and Greg Mortimer became the first Australians to climb Mt Everest, an achievement for which they were both awarded the Medal of the Order of Australia (OAM) for service to mountaineering. Mt Everest historian, Walt Unsworth, described it as "one of the greatest climbs ever done on the mountain" and American climber, John Roskelley, said, "the Aussies pulled off the coup of the century". The expedition was sponsored by Channel 9 who produced a television documentary about the expedition.

=== Gasherbrum IV – second ascent / first ascent of northwest ridge ===
In 1986, fellow Australian Greg Child was organising an international team to attempt Gasherbrum IV (7980m). The mountain's first and only ascent had been in 1958 by an elite team of Italian alpinists, as its sheer faces and rocky ridges had since thwarted many attempts. The climb up the previously-unclimbed north west ridge proved difficult; it was one "that challenged even Macartney-Snape’s legendary strength and endurance at high altitude." Macartney-Snape took a film movie camera on the climb, as he had done on Everest, and the subsequent film, was given the title Harder than Everest. After a night without sleeping bags or stove at just under 8000m Child, Macartney-Snape and American Tom Hargis had finally made the coveted second ascent of Gasherbrum IV.

=== Everest: Sea to Summit Expedition ===
In 1990, Macartney-Snape returned once again to Mt Everest with the idea of climbing the mountain from the sea to the summit. The idea had originally been floated by adventure cameraman Michael Dillon. With sponsorship provided by Australian Geographic, amongst others, it would take Macartney-Snape three months to achieve this goal.

This was the first time anyone had walked from sea level and reached the top of Mt Everest, as even the first expeditions started from Kathmandu, at 1400 m above sea level. While planning the expedition, Macartney-Snape and his then-wife, Ann Ward, were living in Meekatharra, Western Australia, where she was stationed with the Royal Flying Doctor Service. Macartney-Snape trained for the upcoming expedition with demanding runs in the 40-degree heat of the surrounding bush, as well as short, solo climbs on the large boulders around Meekatharra.

The 500 vertical metres from the Bay of Bengal involved a 1200 km walk from the sea, leaving Ganga Sagar on 5 February 1990, walking through India to the Nepalese border. He was joined by Ward, his sister Pip, film-maker Mike Dillon, Nepali cook Tenzing Sherpa, and Charles Norwood, who drove a Land Rover with gear for the trek.

Macartney-Snape planned to avoid three large expeditions attempting the South Col route, by climbing Everest via the more difficult West Ridge, then traversing to descend the standard South Col route. He reached nearly 7500m on acclimatisation sorties, but bad weather and a strong avalanche risk changed Macartney-Snape's plans to ascend via the South Col route. After two preparatory trips through the Khumbu Icefall to the Western Cwm, he left his team on 7 May to attempt the summit solo and without supplemental oxygen, carrying a pack with a tent, food, fuel and a movie camera to the South Col at 8000m. Light-headed and plagued by bouts of diarrhoea following the challenging solo climb up the Lhotse Face, Macartney-Snape rested a day before setting out for the summit of Everest at 9.30pm on 10 May in bright moonlight. Climbing solo, weak with nausea and diarrhea and having eaten little in the previous days, it took nearly six hours in −30 °C (−22 °F) cold for him to ascend from 8,230 m and 8,536 m, nearly falling to his death at midnight when stopping to adjust the movie camera he carried. Then he climbed the South-East Ridge from the South Summit to the true summit. He achieved his second ascent of Everest at about 9:45 am on 11 May, the first to climb from sea to summit. On the summit he unfurled the flag of the Australian Geographic Society, his sponsor, and that of the Foundation for Humanity's Adulthood (now named Fix The World).

In 1993, he was appointed a Member of the Order of Australia (AM) for service to mountaineering and to international relations.

=== Mt Sarmiento ===
In 1995, Macartney-Snape, Stephen Venables, John Roskelley, Jim Wickwire and Charlie Porter attempted a new route on Mt Sarmiento, on the western shores of Tierra del Fuego, where Macartney-Snape, Roskelley and Venables summited via new route up the southwest face of the western summit.

=== Yangma ===
In 2010, Macartney-Snape successfully summited a 6,500m unclimbed peak in remote Eastern Nepal with a team that included four members of the ANUMC Himalayan Expedition of 1978 to Dunagiri.

== Association with Jeremy Griffith and Fix The World ==
Macartney-Snape is a founding director and patron of Fix The World, an organisation dedicated to understanding and ameliorating the human condition. In particular Fix The World supports the work of Australian biologist Jeremy Griffith.

In 1987, the Australian Geographic Society, founded by businessman Dick Smith, arranged a function at which Macartney-Snape made a speech. Griffith attended the function and met with Macartney-Snape. Several months later they met again where Griffith discussed his ideas with Macartney-Snape and gave him a draft copy of his first book Free: The End of the Human Condition. Macartney-Snape said that the explanation given in the book for human nature "made total sense". Macartney-Snape subsequently became involved with Fix The World and in 1990 on Everest's summit filmed himself saying "It is time to climb the mountains of the mind". When Griffith published Beyond the Human Condition in 1991 it featured a foreword written by Macartney-Snape.

In 2020, Macartney-Snape explained his interest in Griffith’s work, saying, “Mountains are an apt metaphor for the urge to explore and ultimately get to the bottom of the greatest riddle of all, why humans are the way we are—the only animal capable of great works of art and acts of selflessness, yet at the same time capable of wilfully committing the greatest atrocities. The answer does lie in us ‘climbing the mountains of our mind’—in healing our psychosis through compassionate understanding of how we ended up in this predicament.”

In 2025, Macartney-Snape wrote that Griffith had answered what John Kenneth Galbraith referred to as "the search for a truly superior moral justification for selfishness."

=== Defamation case ===
In 1995, an Australian Broadcasting Corporation Four Corners program was broadcast and a feature article was published in The Sydney Morning Herald newspaper concerning Macartney-Snape, Griffith and Fix The World. In 2003 and 2005, respectively, the publications were found by NSW Supreme Court juries to be defamatory of Macartney-Snape, Griffith and Fix The World. In 2008, Macartney-Snape was awarded almost $500,000 plus costs for the loss and damage caused by the broadcast, with the total payout expected to exceed $1 million. Macartney-Snape said "Thirteen years later the truth has caught up with the lie". In 2009, The Sydney Morning Herald published an apology for the harm caused by the article.

== Awards ==
- Keys to the City of Sydney
- Medal of the Order of Australia (OAM) (1987). For service to mountaineering.
- Member of the Order of Australia (AM) (1993). For service to mountaineering and to international relations.
- Australian Sports Medal (2000). For Service To Mountaineering.

== Bibliography ==
=== Books ===
- Being Outside: A comprehensive manual for all who want to enjoy the outdoors Terrey Hills, N.S.W. : Australian Geographic, 1993.
- Mountain adventurer Milton, Qld. : Jacaranda Press, 1992.
- Everest from sea to summit Terrey Hills, N.S.W. : Australian Geographic, 1992.

=== Films ===
- Everest: The Australian Challenge: The First Australian Mt Everest Expedition's ascent of the great Couloir Route Autumn 1984 Channel 9. 1984.
- Harder than Everest: Gasherbrum IV Film Australia. 1987.
- Everest: from Sea to Summit Australian Geographic. 1992.
- The Australian Alps - Mirka's Palace of Dreams Kestrel Film Productions. 1986.

== Other Charitable Work ==
Macartney-Snape is a member of The Fred Hollows Foundation, Patron of the Outdoor Council of Australia, and a foundation director of World Expeditions Foundation.
