= Middle Peak (Nevada) =

Mountain in Nevada, United States

Coordinates: 35°13′57″N 114°44′21″W

Middle Widows Peak is a summit in the U.S. state of Nevada. The elevation is 4,081 feet (1,244 m).

Middle Peak was so named on account of its central location relative to nearby mountains.
