= World Expeditions =

Travel and holiday companies of Austria

- Type: Tour Operator
- Industry: Tourism
- Founded: 1975
- Headquarters: Sydney, Australia
- Products: Adventure Travel Holidays
- Website: worldexpeditions.com

World Expeditions is an adventure travel and ecotourism company that offers trekking and adventure holidays.

== History ==
The company was started in September 1975 as Australian Himalayan Expeditions to offer trekking holidays in the Himalayan. By 1990’s the company started offering adventure holidays on all continents. In 2007, the company started UTracks as an active European holiday division to offer a range of self-guided walking and cycling trips in Europe. In 2011, the company announced a collaboration with New Zealand’s Adventure South NZ which it eventually acquired outright in .

In 2013, The World Expeditions Travel Group was created through a corporate restructuring of World Expeditions and became the parent company of World Expeditions and several other subsidiaries.

In 2018 they were selected by National Geographic expeditions to operate the company’s Active Expeditions range of trips for the Australasian region. In January 2019, World Expeditions joined the coalition for the ethical wildlife tourism and in July 2019, the company signed World Animal Protection's elephant-friendly pledge and stopped promoting elephant rides to comply with the wildlife-friendly travel policies. In June 2019, the company announced that it has removed the eagle hunting festival program from its Mongolian program.

In September 2019, the company affiliated with WorldView project by gear company Kathmandu to render walks in New Zealand, Kilimanjaro and on the Larapinta Trail in Australia on Google Streetmap 3.

On 14 October 2019, the company announced that it will offset the carbon emissions of all their holidays from November 2019.

=== Acquisitions ===
- 2016: Completed the purchase of Sherpa Van.
- 2017: Completed acquisition of Trail Journeys
- 2018: Completed the acquisition of the Blue Mountains Adventure Company.

== Sibling and charitable projects ==
World Expeditions established World Expeditions Foundation in Australia to raise donations for education based projects in underprivileged communities across the globe. The company also established the Community Project Travel (CPT) program to assisting underprivileged communities. In 2013, World Expeditions set up a charity division, Huma Charity Challenge which raised funds across the globe.
