= Middle Triple Peak =

Mountain in Alaska, United States

- Location within Alaska
- Interactive map of Middle Triple Peak

Highest point
- Elevation: 8,835 ft (2,693 m)
- Prominence: 1,800 ft (550 m)
- Coordinates: 62°23′41″N 152°46′05″W

Geography
- Location: Denali National Park and Preserve, Alaska, United States
- Parent range: Kichatna Mountains, Alaska Range

Climbing
- First ascent: 1976 by R McLean, C Porter

Middle Triple Peak is the second highest peak in the Kichatna Mountains, a subrange of the Alaska Range in Alaska, United States. It is a striking rock tower, with immense, sheer walls on the east and west sides.

Its East Buttress route (roughly 3,600 feet/1,100 m high) is a classic hard rock climbing route, although the first pitch was destroyed by rockfall (discovered by Nancy Hansen in 2012) and the route has not been climbed since. Due to the remoteness of the range and the usually terrible weather, this peak has seen only a few ascents. The first ascent of the peak was in 1976 by Russell McLean and Charlie Porter (fresh from the first solo of the Cassin Ridge on Denali).

== Notable ascents and routes ==
- 1976 West Face. Charlie Porter and Russell McLean, June 21 to July 1, 1976.
- 1976 Illusory Ridge (north ridge) (NCCS V, F8 A3). David Black, Andrew Embick, Michael Graber, Alan Long. Summit reached July 10, 1976.
- 1977 East Buttress Andy Embick, Mike Graber, Al Long and George Schunk, June 2 to June 9, 1997.
- 1997 Ride the Lightning, VI 5.10 A4 WI3. Dan Osman, Kitty Calhoun, Steve Gerberding and Jay Smith
