= One Heart Source =

Humanitarian organisation

One Heart Source is a volunteer-led, humanitarian organization that believes in combatting conditions like poverty, disease, and illiteracy through education.

The organization also runs an academic-intensive children’s home and education center outside of Arusha, Tanzania, which serves as a home and family for twenty children who have been abandoned or orphaned due to the HIV/AIDS epidemic. The site on which the home rests also doubles as an after-school tuition and sports center for the children of the surrounding areas. The organization also provides general community health education, with an emphasis on HIV prevention, to students and community members. The educational programs are run year-round by teams of Tanzanian, American, and British university students whom the organization recruits from universities around the world. Volunteers live in homestays with families in the village where they work, teach in local primary and secondary schools, and run community programs - ranging from literacy programs for adults to after-school soccer programs for children. Participants must fundraise in order to volunteer with the organization and undergo an intensive pre-field training process before the program.

== Legal Information ==
One Heart Source is a registered non-profit organization in the United States and the state of California, and the charity is currently listed with the California State Attorney General's Office, registration number CT0144811. The California State Attorney General's Office shows that the organization is headed by CEO Hori Moroiaca. The organization is also a legally registered NGO in Tanzania.
