= Nyalam Tong La =

Chinese mountain pass

- Thong La, Tong La, Yakrushong La, Yarle Shung La, Yakri Shung La, Kuti Pass
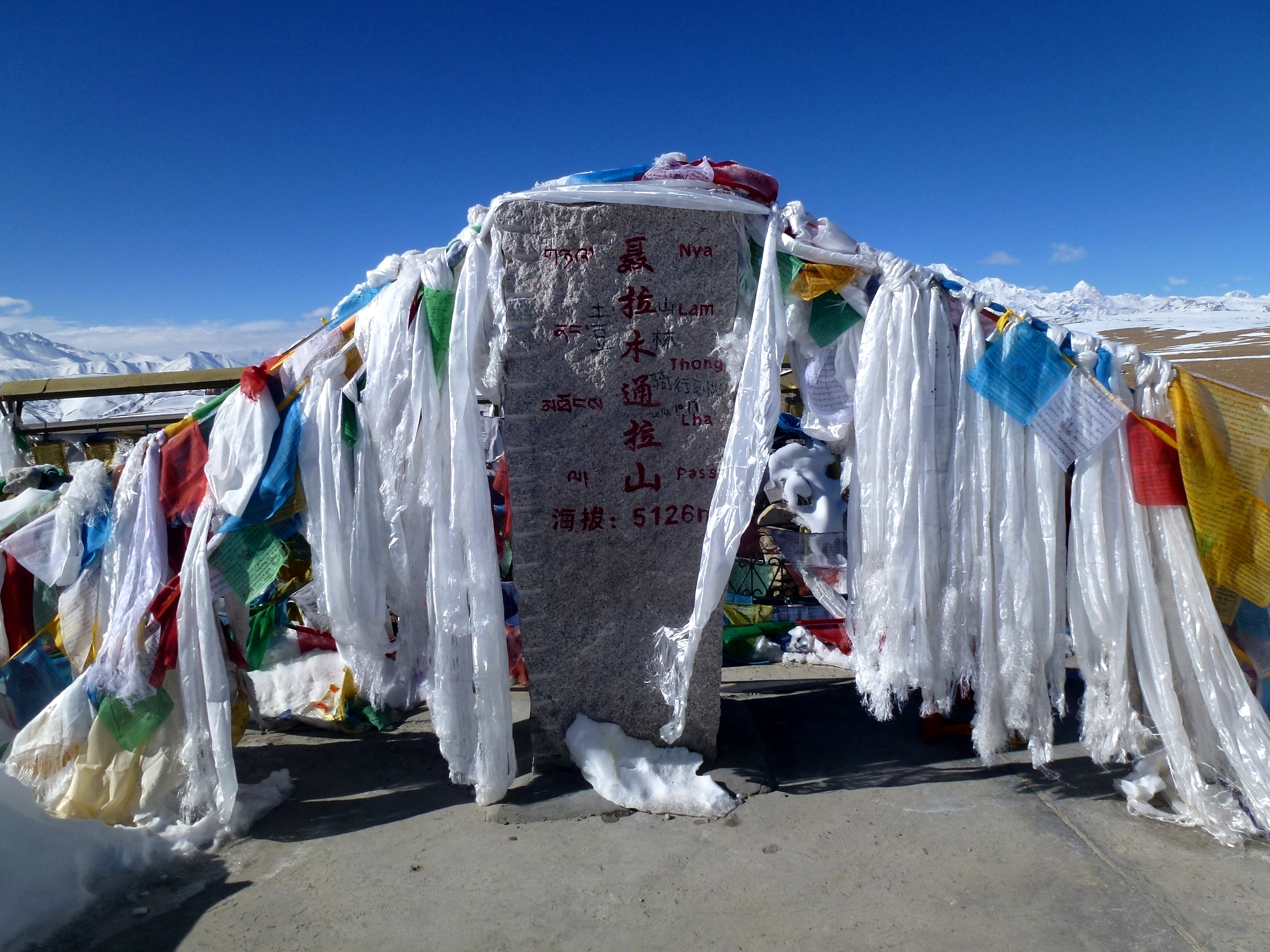
- Nyalam Tong La Pass

- Location within Tibet
- Elevation: 5,126 metres (16,820 ft)
- Traversed by: G318 (National Highway 318)

Third Approach
- Location: Nyalam, Shigatse, Tibet, China
- Range: Himalaya; Labuche Himal, Jugal Himal
- Coordinates: 28°31′N 86°10′E

Nyalam Tong La or Yakrushong La is a mountain pass in China on the Matsung Tsangpo-Phung Chhu watershed divide where the Friendship Highway connecting Kathmandu, Nepal and Lhasa, Tibet crosses at 5,150 metres (16,900 ft) elevation.

Originally called Yakrushong La and Kuti Pass by Nepalese traders, the pass is currently generally known as Nyalam Tong La ("pass from which Nyalam is visible"), or simply Tong La, although the original Tong La pass lies further east on the traditional Tingri-Nyalam trade route. About 11 km north, the Friendship Highway crosses another pass 5,050 metres (16,570 ft) Lalung La which is not a significant watershed divide.

From the Matsang Tsangpo-Phung Chhu divide, the Matsang flows directly south into Nepal where its name changes to Sun Kosi. North of the divide Men Chhu flows northeast into the Phung Chhu (or Bum Chhu in Tibetan; Peng Qu in Chinese) which flows east to 87d40'E where it combines with other streams and turns south to cut a deep valley between the Mahalangur (Mount Everest) and Kanchenjunga sections of the Himalaya. As it crosses into Nepal its name changes to Arun. Sun Kosi and Arun are both counted among the Kosi River's seven notable Himalayan tributaries.

Nyalam Tong La also separates the Jugal and Labuche sections of the Himalaya. The Jugal section to the west includes 8,013 meter Shishapangma while the less famous Labuche (or Lapche) section to the east includes 7,367 meter Labuche Kang.

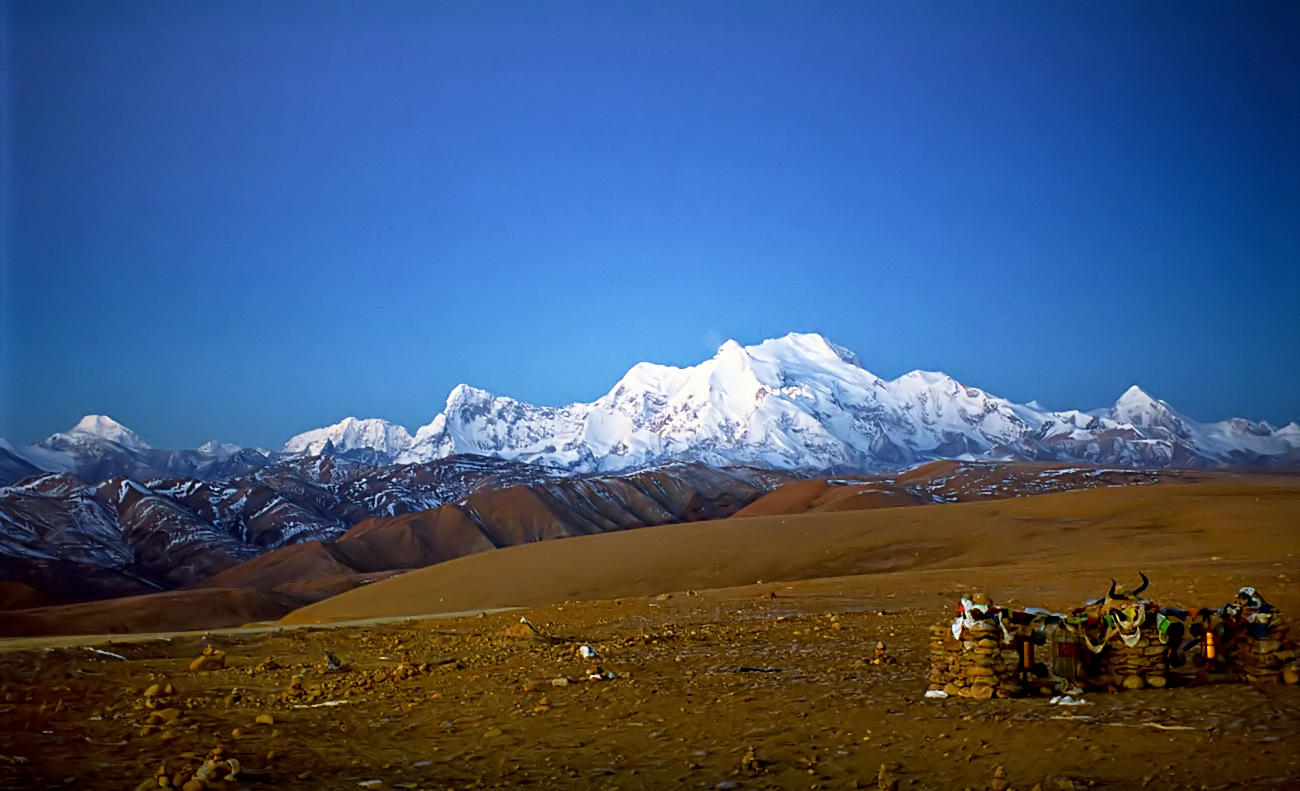
Shishapangma from Nyalam Tong La

== See also ==
- Friendship Highway (Tibet)
- Arun River
- Sun Kosi
