= Labuche Kang III/East =

Mountain in Tibet

Labuche Kang III
- Labuche Kang East
- Location within Tibet Location within China

Highest point
- Elevation: 7,250 m (23,790 ft); Ranked 93rd
- Prominence: 570 m (1,870 ft)
- Coordinates: 28°18′05″N 86°23′02″E

Geography
- Location: Tibet Autonomous Region, China
- Parent range: Himalayas

Climbing
- First ascent: Unclimbed
- Easiest route: Technical

Labuche Kang III, also known as Labuche Kang East (7,250 metres (23,790 ft)), is a mountain located on the Labuche Kang massif in Tibet Autonomous Region and is the highest unclimbed non-prohibited mountain in the world. (Note: Gangkhar Puensum is taller, but mountaineering in Bhutan is illegal. Kunyang Chhish Wes and Summa Ri are taller peaks, but have a low prominence (202 and 246 meters) and are considered sub-peaks rather than independent mountains) It is 3.17 km east of Labuche Kang, its parent. It has a prominence height of 570 m (1,870 ft).

== Secondary Peak ==
A sub-peak called East Labuche Kang II (7,040 m (23,100 ft)) is located about a mile east of the main summit. It has a prominence height of 180 m (590 ft).

== See also ==
- List of highest mountains
- List of Ultras of the Himalayas
