= Highest unclimbed mountain =

Highest summits never reached by mountaineers

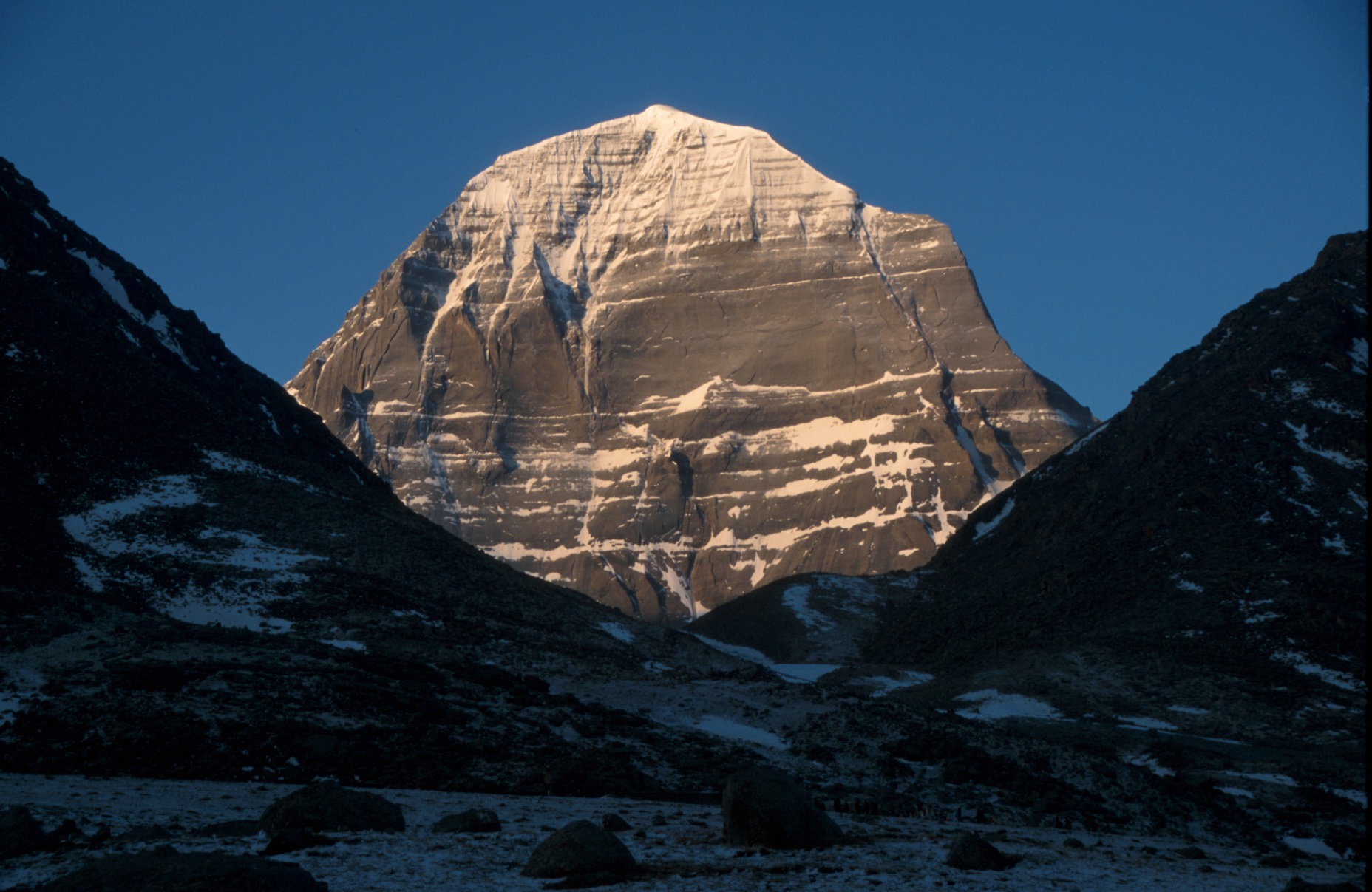
Mount Kailash is off limits due to religious beliefs.

An unclimbed mountain is a mountain peak that has not been climbed to the top. Determining which unclimbed peak is highest is often a matter of controversy. In some parts of the world, surveying and mapping are still unreliable. There are no comprehensive records of the routes of explorers, mountaineers, and local inhabitants. In some cases, even modern ascents by larger parties have been poorly documented and, with no universally recognized listing, the best that can be achieved in determining the world's highest unclimbed peaks is somewhat speculative. Most sources indicate that Gangkhar Puensum (7,570 metres, 24,840 ft) on the Bhutan-Tibet border is the tallest mountain in the world that has not been fully summited. Gangkhar Puensum has been off limits to climbers since 1994 when Bhutan prohibited all mountaineering above 6,000 m (20,000 ft), reportedly due to spiritual beliefs.

Unclimbed mountains are sometimes referred to as virgin peaks. Many virgin peaks exist because no one has had access to that mountain due to its geographic isolation or political instability. Some are off limits due to religious beliefs in that country or region which hold that a certain mountain is sacred and should remain inviolate. Of those, Mount Kailash, a mountain in the Ngari Prefecture, Tibet Autonomous Region of China, with an altitude of 6,638 m (21,778 ft), is one of the most prominent. It lies in the Kailash Range (Gangdisê Mountains) of the Transhimalaya, in the western part of the Tibetan Plateau. Mount Kailash is considered sacred in four religions: Hinduism, Buddhism, Jainism and Bon. Because of its status as a sacred mountain there are annual pilgrimages to see it, but any climbing activities on it are forbidden.

Additionally, since climbing tall mountains is usually a major undertaking and climbers are attracted to climbing the tallest ones, lower peaks (even if they are very formidable) simply get less attention, and instead the taller peaks are summited again, by parties following a new route, or perhaps during the winter when conditions are generally more treacherous.

== Challenges in definition ==
=== Definition of a mountain ===
Figure 1. Vertical arrows show the topographic prominence of three peaks on an island. The dashed horizontal lines show the lowest contours that do not encircle higher peaks. Curved arrows point from a peak to its parent.

Many mountains, in addition to their highest point or peak, also have subpeaks. There is no universally accepted way of deciding when a subpeak is distinct enough to be classified as a mountain in its own right; therefore, any list of the world's mountains is subject to dispute. The topographic prominence of each apex and the general topography of the area both come into consideration when determining their status. Although objective criteria have been proposed, there is no widely agreed standard. In 1994, the International Climbing and Mountaineering Federation classified 82 mountain peaks in the Alps whose summits were at least 4,000 m (13,000 ft) above sea level and with at least 30 m (98 ft) of topographic prominence over any adjacent mountain pass or col, as a distinct peak.

=== Verification of unclimbed status ===
It can be difficult sometimes to determine whether or not a mountain peak has been fully summited. Long before modern mountaineering commenced in the middle of the 19th century, evidence indicates that people did indeed travel up to the summits or near to the summits of major mountain peaks. Archaeological excavations in the Andes have shown that humans traveled up to 6,739 m (22,110 ft) in prehistoric times. Permanent settlements as high as 4,500 m (14,800 ft) were established as far back as 12,000 years ago in the Andes. In the Greater Himalaya region, Lhasa, in Tibet, sitting at 3,650 m (11,980 ft) has been permanently occupied since the 7th century and many smaller settlements across the Greater Himalaya thrive at elevations exceeding 4,000 m (13,000 ft). With humans living at high elevations for many millennia, nearby peaks to such settlements may or may not have been summited at some point in the past. However, many regions away from settlements may never have been explored, especially since some high peaks in the Greater Ranges are so remote that they were unknown to local inhabitants until they were sighted by explorers.

The world's third-tallest peak, Kangchenjunga, has been summited a number of times, but on the 1955 expedition the first climbers of the peak agreed to honor the wishes of locals and not set foot on the topmost part of the mountain. Succeeding mountaineering parties may (or may not) have followed this tradition. Machapuchare had only one summit attempt back in 1957 when climbers came within 150 m (490 ft) of the summit, but turned back to honour King Mahendra's words, as he had permitted them to climb without stepping foot on the summit itself; Nepal then banned future attempts, but Bill Denz may have climbed the mountain illegally decades later.

== Gangkhar Puensum ==
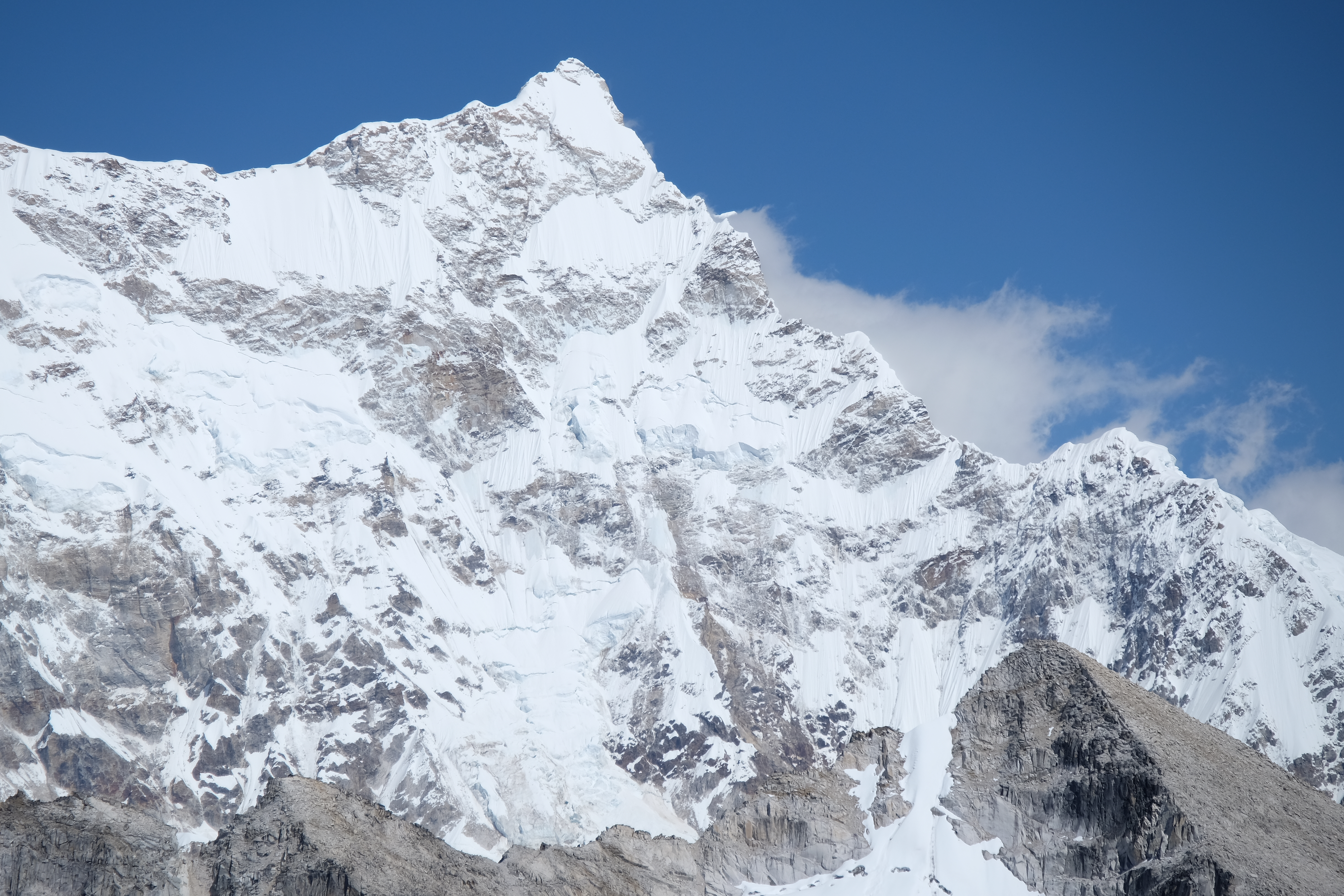
Summit of Gangkhar Puensum from Gophu La pass, Bhutan

The mountain most widely claimed to be the highest unclimbed mountain in the world in terms of elevation is Gangkhar Puensum (7,570 m, 24,840 ft). It is in Bhutan, on or near the border with China. In Bhutan, the climbing of mountains higher than 6,000 m (20,000 ft) has been prohibited since 1994. The rationale for this prohibition is based on local customs that consider this and similar peaks to be the sacred homes of protective deities and spirits, and the lack of high-altitude rescue resources from any locale closer than India. The prohibition was further expanded in 2003 when mountaineering of any kind was disallowed entirely within Bhutan. Gangkhar Puensum will likely remain unclimbed so long as the government of Bhutan prohibits it.

== Highest unclimbed non-prohibited peak ==
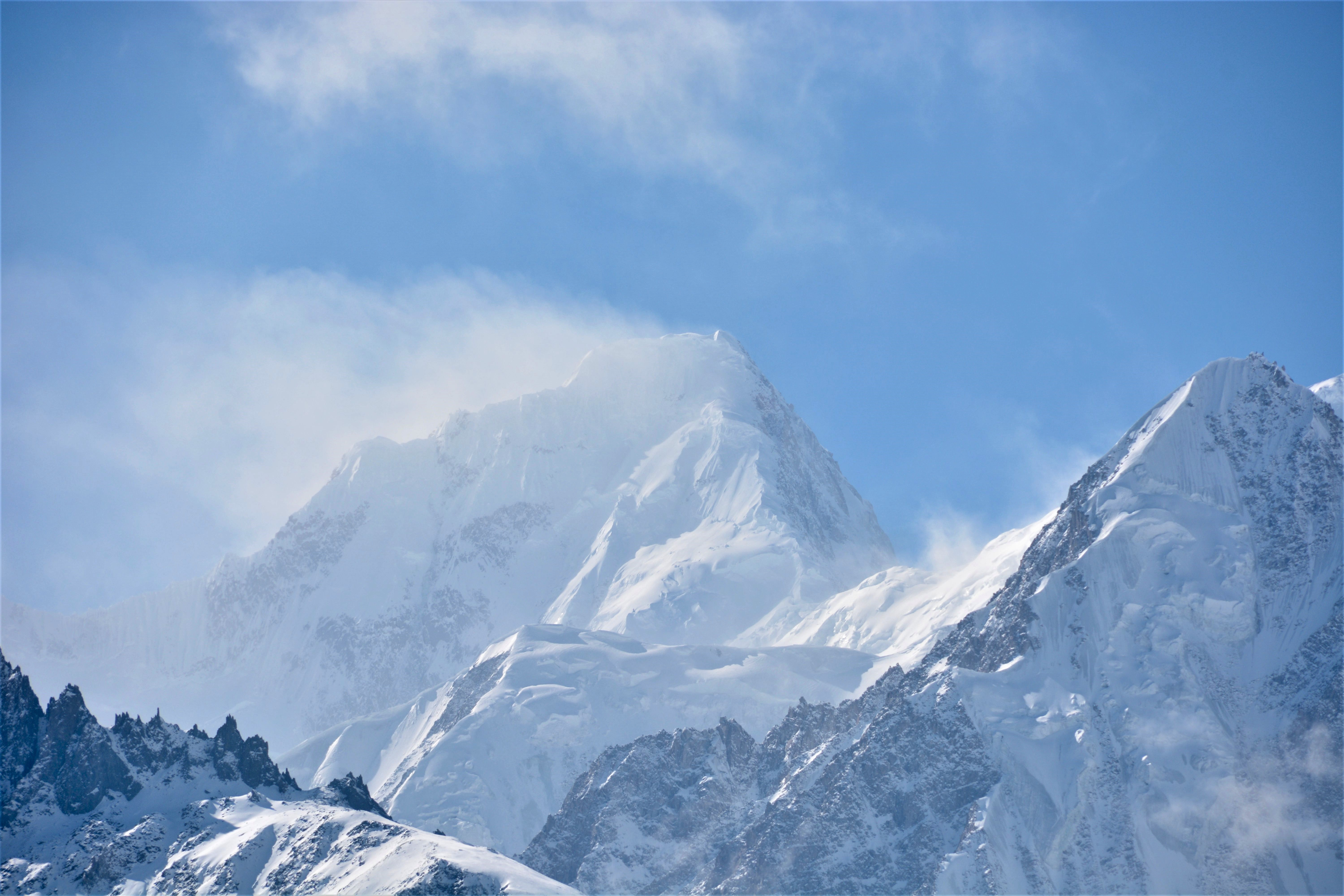
A sub-peak of Kunyang Chhish is one of the highest unclimbed non-prohibited peaks.

It is unclear which is the highest unclimbed non-prohibited mountain. While some recognize only peaks with 100 m (330 ft) of topographical prominence as individual summits, the International Climbing and Mountaineering Federation was using a 30 m (98 ft) cutoff for determining individual summits (from 1994 to at least 2013). Unclimbed summits includes Summa Ri (7,302 m or 23,957 ft) with prominence of 246 m or 807 ft, and Labuche Kang III/East (7,250 m, 23,790 ft) with prominence of 570 m (1,870 ft).

== Most prominent unclimbed peak ==
Mount Siple on Siple Island is one of the most prominent unclimbed peaks.

Unclimbed candidates with high topographic prominence are by definition independent mountains, but some have relatively modest elevations. With such peaks, there is a greater possibility of undocumented ascents, perhaps occurring long ago.

As of November 2025, Sauyr Zhotasy (3,840 m or 12,600 ft, prominence of 3,252 m or 10,669 ft), the high point in the Saur Range on the border between Kazakhstan and China, and Mount Siple (3,110 m or 10,200 ft, prominence of 3,110 m or 10,200 ft) on Siple Island off the coast of Antarctica, have no record of successful ascents. The unclimbed status of each of these peaks is difficult to confirm, although Mount Siple in particular is remote, uninhabited (and without any nearby habitation), and seldom visited.

== List of highest unclimbed peaks ==
The following peaks, with a minimum prominence of 150 m (490 ft), were thought to be unclimbed as of 12 November 2025. At least 21 peaks of over 7000 m are thought to have been unclimbed.

Rank	Peak	Height		Prominence		Parent	Location
Rank	Peak	m	ft	m	ft	Parent	Location
**1**	**Gangkhar Puensum**	**7570**	**24836**	**2995**	**9826**	**Kangchenjunga**	**Bhutan/China**
2	Kunyang Chhish West (Note: Also known as Pyramid Peak.)	7350	24114	202	663	Kunyang Chhish	Pakistan
3	Summa Ri (Note: Also known as Savoia Kangri.)	7302	23957	246	807	Skilbrum	Pakistan
**4**	**Labuche Kang III** (Note: Also known as Labuche Kang East.)	**7250**	**23786**	**570**	**1870**	**Labuche Kang**	**China**
**5**	**Apsarasas Kangri** (Note: Jurgalski considers the unclimbed peak known as "Apsarasis III" just higher than "Apsarasis I" (7241 m), which was climbed on August 7, 1976.)	**7243**	**23763**	**607**	**1991**	**Teram Kangri I**	**India**
**6**	**Tongshanjiabu** (Note: Also known as Gyalbu Kangri.)	**7207**	**23645**	**1757**	**5764**	**Gangkhar Puensum**	**Bhutan/China**
7	Skyang Kangri West	7174	23537	194	636	Skyang Kangri	Pakistan
8	Chamar South	7161	23494	219	719	Chamar	Nepal
9	Namcha Barwa II	7146	23445	166	545	Namcha Barwa	China
10	Chongtar Kangri NE	7145	23442	205	673	Chongtar Kangri	China
11	Asapurna I (Note: Also known as West Gangapurna.)	7140	23425	262	860	Annapurna I	Nepal
**12**	**Urdok Kangri II** (Note: Also known as Sia Kangri North.)	**7137**	**23415**	**321**	**1053**	**Sia Kangri**	**Pakistan/China**
**13**	**Praqpa Kangri I** (Note: Also known as Praqpa Ri.)	**7134**	**23406**	**668**	**2192**	**Skilbrum**	**Pakistan**
14	Annapurna Dakshin NE	7126	23379	151	495	Annapurna Dakshin	Nepal
**15**	**Teri Kang**	**7125**	**23376**	**454**	**1490**	**Tongshanjiabu**	**Bhutan/China**
**16**	**Sanglung**	**7095**	**23278**	**995**	**3264**	**Namcha Barwa**	**China**
**17**	**Sia Kangri II** (Note: Also known as Mount Hardinge or Sia Kangri South.)	**7075**	**23212**	**347**	**1134**	**Sia Kangri**	**Pakistan/China**
18	Asapurna II (Note: Also known as Tare Kang.)	7069	23192	156	512	Asapurna I	Nepal
19	Malangutti Sar South	7061	23166	157	515	Malangutti Sar	Pakistan
20	East Labuche Kang II (Note: Also known as Peak 7040.)	7040	23097	180	591	Labuche Kang II	China
**21**	**Shudu Tsenpa**	**7024**	**23045**	**547**	**1795**	**Pauhunri**	**India/China**
Mountains with prominence over 300 m have **rows in bold**.; Rows shaded red indicate prohibited peaks.

== See also ==
- List of mountain peaks by prominence
- List of highest mountains on Earth
