= Shudu Tsenpa =

Unclimbed peak on China–India Border

- Location within Tibet

Highest point
- Elevation: 7,024 m (23,045 ft)
- Prominence: 547 m (1,795 ft)
- Coordinates: 27°55′36″N 88°51′39″E

Geography
- Location: China; India
- Region: Tibet Autonomous Region, China; Sikkim State, India
- Parent range: Himalayas

Climbing
- First ascent: Unclimbed

Shudu Tsenpa is a mountain in the Himalayas, on the border between Sikkim in India and Tibet in China. It is 7,024 m (23,045 ft) above sea level and has a promience of 547 m (1,795 ft). It is one of the highest unclimbed mountains in the world with no recorded attempts. It is located 3.38 km southeast of Pauhunri. A glacier flowing to the northeast separates the two mountains. Three catchment areas meet at Shudu Tsenpa. The northwest flank flows to the Yarlung Tsangpo River, the upper reaches of the Brahmaputra. The eastern flank is drained by the Torsa River and the southwest flank by the Lachung River, the left tributary of the Tista River.

== See also ==
- Sanglung
