= Asapurna =

Two sub-peaks of Annapurna in the Himalayas

Asapurna I & II
- West Gangapurna
- View from south (Machapuchare base camp)

Highest point
- Elevation: 7,140 m (23,430 ft)
- Prominence: 262 m (860 ft)
- Coordinates: 28°36′4″N 83°56′30″E

Geography
- Location within Nepal
- Location: Nepal
- Province: Gandaki Province
- District(s): Kaski and Myagdi
- Parent range: Annapurna

Climbing
- First ascent: Unclimbed

Asapurna (also known as Asapurna I and II and West Gangapurna) are two sub-peaks of Annapurna I in the Himalayan Range. It is located in the Gandaki Pradesh in central Nepal.

It is among the highest unclimbed mountains in the world with no recorded ascents. However, an attempt in 2016 by Kim Chang-Ho and his two colleagues reached within 100 m of the summit.

== Location ==
Asapurna I has a height of 7,140 m (23,430 ft) and a prominence of 262 m (860 ft). The summit is located 1.58 km west of Gangapurna. Its parent, however is Annapurna I, which is west of the summit.

Asapurna II (also known as Tare Kang) has a height of 7,069 m (23,192 ft) and a prominence of 156 m (512 ft). The summit is located 1.96 km west of Asapurna I, its parent.

North slope of Asapurna (centre) between Annapurna III and Gangapurna (left) and Tare Kang, Tarke Kang (Glacier Dome) and Khangsar Kang (Roc Noir) (right)

== See also ==
- Summa Ri
