= Nyalam =

Nyalam may refer to:

- Nyalam County, county in Tibet
- Nyalam Town, town in Tibet
