= Shigatse Dzong =

Fortress in Samzhubzê District, China

- Tibetan transcription(s); Tibetan: གཞིས་ཀ་རྩེ་ རྫོང་ Chinese transcription(s); Traditional: 日喀則宗; Simplified: 日喀则宗; Pinyin: Rìkāzé Zōng, Xigazê Dzong
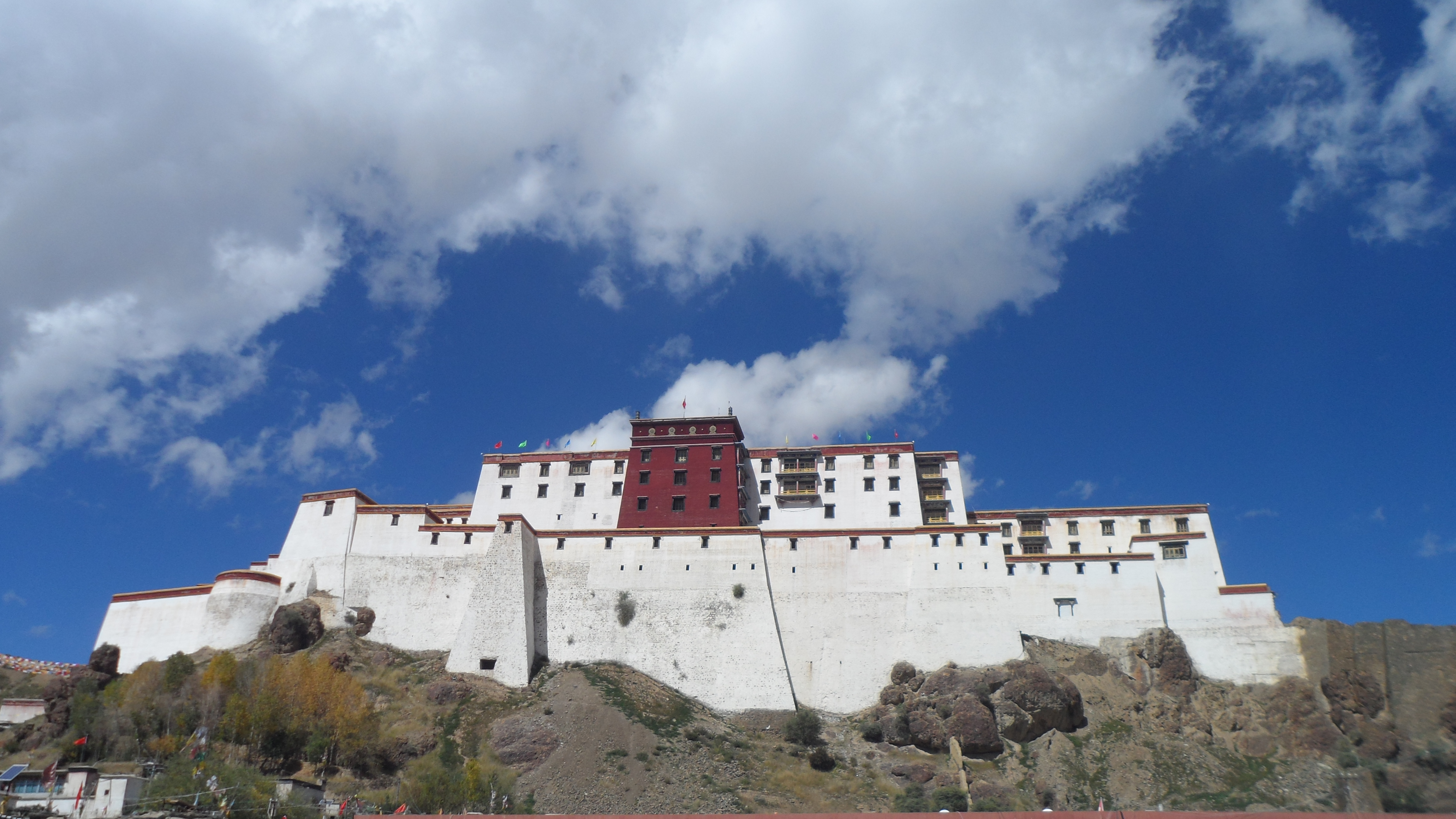
- Refurbished Shigatse Dzong, 2007

- Location within Tibet

Religion
- Affiliation: Tibetan Buddhism

Location
- Location: Tibet
- Country: China
- Interactive map of Shigatse Dzong
- Coordinates: 29°16′38″N 88°52′32″E

Architecture
- Style: Dzong
- Founder: First Dalai Lama
- Established: 1439; 587 years ago

The Shigatse Dzong, also known as Samdruptse Dzong, is located in Shigatse, Tibet, China. It is spelt Rikaze Dzong (official spelling: Xigazê Dzong; other spellings: Shigatse Dzong, Shikatse Dzong, Zhigatsey Dzong, simplified Chinese: 日喀则宗; traditional Chinese: 日喀則宗; pinyin: Rìkāzé Zōng, Standard Tibetan: གཞིས་ཀ་རྩེ་རྫོང་).

Shigatse Dzong was originally built by Karma Phuntsok Namgyal (1611–1621), the second in the line of the Nyak family who ruled Tibet from 1565 to 1642, after which the capital was moved to Lhasa. Shigtse Dzong's historic importance was accentuated by the fact that the Mongol ruler Gusri Khan installed the Fifth Dalai Lama as the supreme ruler of Tibet, which then covered territory from Tachienlu in the east up to the Ladakh border in the west in the 17th century. In later years, the fort became the residence of the governor of Tsang. The modern city of Shigatse has developed around the base of the Dzong.

The Dzong was destroyed in 1961, after the 1959 Tibetan uprising, but was rebuilt in 2007 at the same location, though on a smaller scale.

The large Tashilhunpo Monastery, founded in 1447 by Gendun Drup, the First Dalai Lama, is close to the base of the fort in Shigatse.

== Geography ==
The Shigatse Dzong and the city called Shigatse are located at an altitude of about 3,860 metres (12,660 ft), slightly higher than Lhasa. The oxygen content of the air is only 67 percent of that at sea level, while the average annual temperatures are 16 °C (61 °F) in mid-summer and −5 °C (23 °F) in mid-winter. The Shigatse Dzong is situated at the confluence of the Yarlung Tsangpo (aka Brahmaputra River and Niang chu (Nyang Chu) rivers in West Tibet. Shigatse was the ancient capital of Ü-Tsang province. The location of the Dzong on the hilltop dominates the scenic views of the town and the Tashilhunpo Monastery. Shigatse is also the name of the surrounding county, whose population is approximately 94,000.

The city of Shigatse is the second-largest city in Tibet, with a population of about 12,000. It is the hub of the road network between Lhasa, Nepal, and western Tibet. The road follows both the north and south banks of the Tsongpo via the northern route of Yangpachen. It is expected that the Qinghai-Tibet railway will be extended to Shigatse by 2010.China National Highway 318 also passes through Shigatse.

== History ==
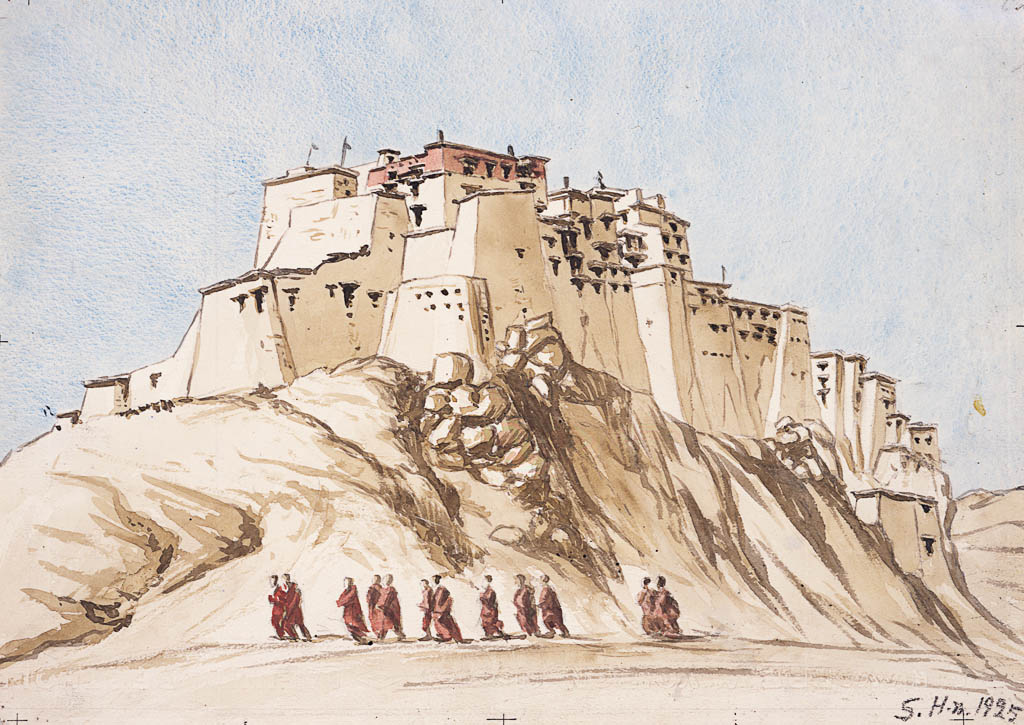
drawing of Shigatse Dzong by Sven Hedin from Southern Tibet (1917)

The imposing Shigatse Dzong was built in the 17th century as a smaller prototype of the Potala in Lhasa, and had turret-like fortifications at the ends and a central Red Palace. In the 17th century, the Mongols (by Gusri Khan in 1642) supported the Fifth Dalai Lama and defeated Prince Tsang at Shigatse. After this event, the Tashilhunpo Monastery came under the control of the Yellow Hat sect. The rivalry between the Sakya and the Gelukpa orders is traced to this event; the Geukpa sect of the Dalai Lama controlled from Central Tibet and the Panchen Lama controlled from Shigatse.

Shigatse was previously the seat of the kings of Ü-Tsang and the capital of the province of Ü-Tsang or Tsang. It was sacked when the Gurkhas invaded Tibet and captured Shigatse in 1791 before a combined Tibetan and Chinese army drove the Gurkhas back as far as the outskirts of Kathmandu. The Gurkhas were forced to agree to keep the peace in future, pay tribute every five years, and return what they had looted from Tashilhunpo.

Shigatse was also the traditional seat of the Panchen Lamas. Until the Chinese arrived in the 1950s, the "Tashi" or Panchen Lama wielded temporal power over three small districts, though not over the town of Shigatse itself, which was administered by a dzongpön (general) appointed from Lhasa.

== Destruction and rebuilding of the Dzong ==
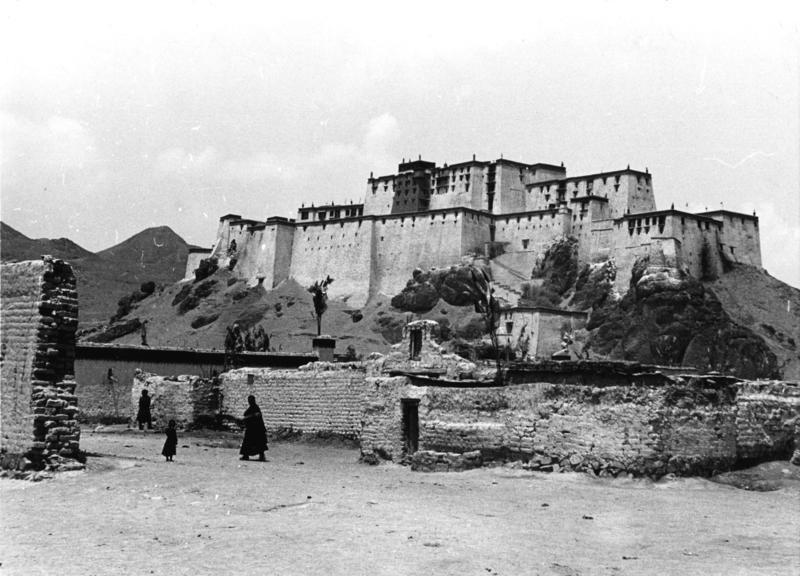
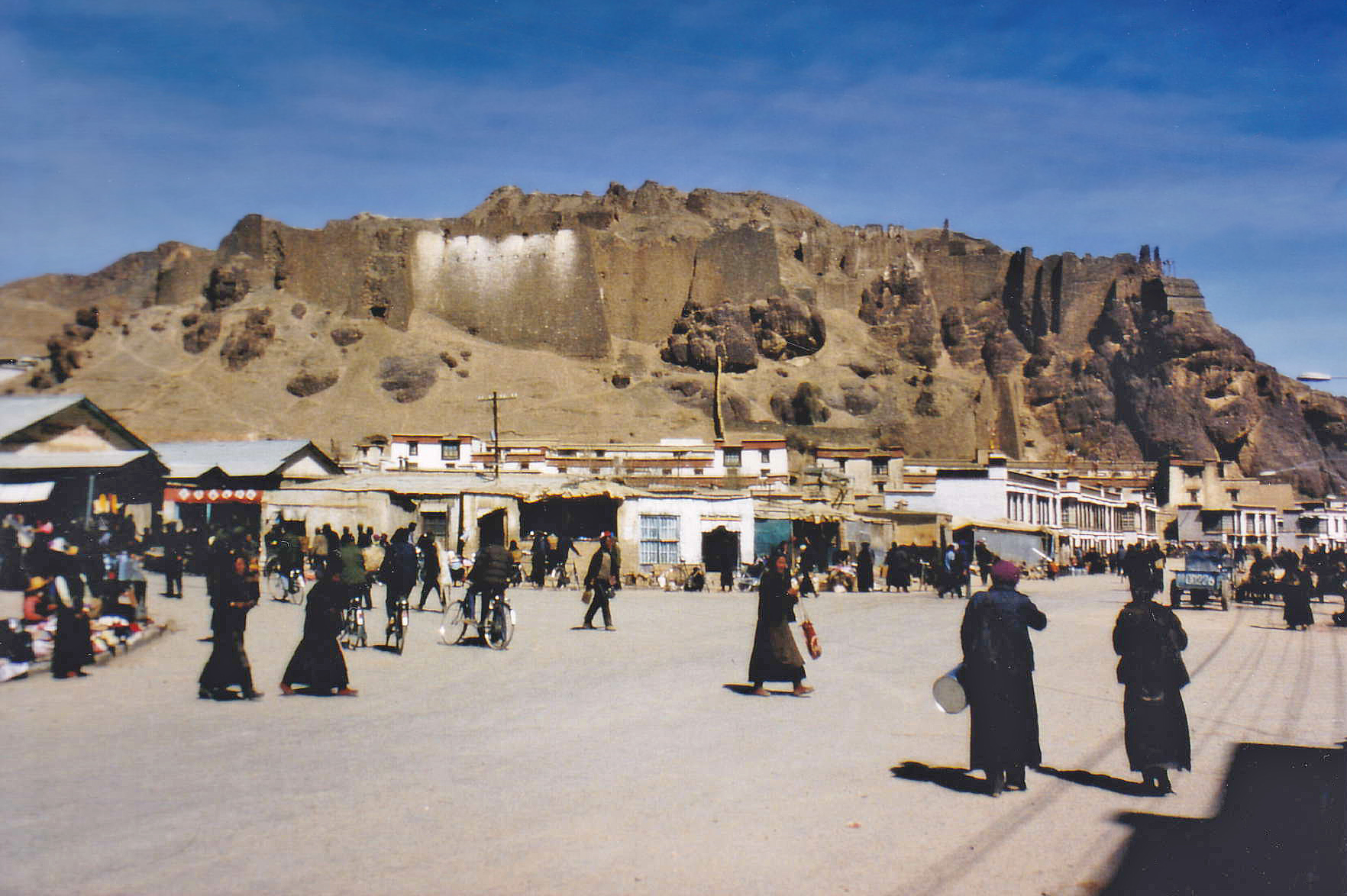
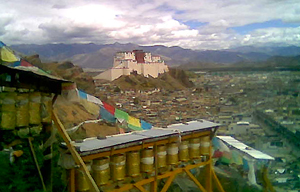
Left: Shigatse fortress or Samdrubtse Dzong in 1938: Center: The destroyed castle in 1987: Right:The reconstructed castle (dzong) of Shigatse in 2007.

During the Chinese Cultural Revolution in Tibet in 1961, the Dzong was demolished "stone by stone". This destruction was instigated by the Chinese and resulted in the complete razing of the Dzong, which held an imposing view above the Shigatse town; only a few ramparts were left.

Between 2005 and 2007, the building was reconstructed, financed by donations from Shanghai. The basis of the reconstruction were old photos, yet reconstruction was executed in cement/concrete. Since then, the outside has been wainscotted with natural stones. The Dzong has become a museum on Tibetan culture.

== Nearby attractions ==
Within the precincts of the Dzong and the city of Shigatse are many monuments of religious importance, such as the Tashilhunpo Monastery and the Shalu Monastery. Another important structure is the Narthang Monastery, a 12th-century monastery of the Kadampa order which housed the first printing establishment in Central Tibet.

=== Tashilhunpo Monastery ===
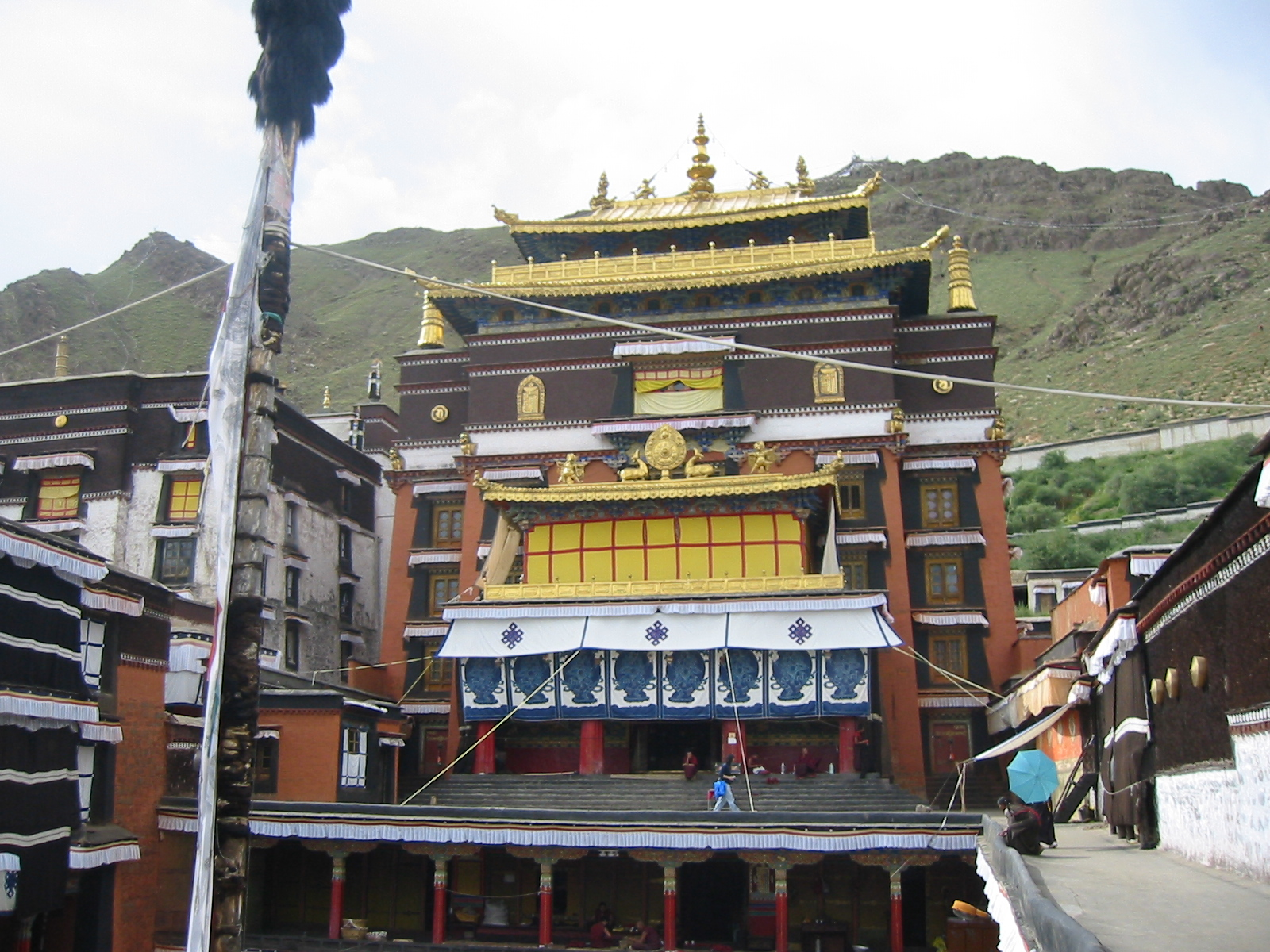
Tashilhunpo Monastery

Tashilhunpo Monastery (Tibetan: བཀྲ་ཤིས་ལྷུན་པོ་), founded in 1447 by Gendun Drup, the First Dalai Lama, is a historic and culturally important monastery next to Shigatse, the second-largest city in Tibet.

The monastery is the traditional seat of successive Panchen Lamas, the second-highest-ranking tulku lineage in the Gelukpa tradition. The monastery is one of the six great Gelukpa-order monasteries founded in 1447 by Gendup Drup. On the eastern side of the monastery stands the old living quarters of the Panchen Lama — the Panchen Lama's Palace, known as Gudong. Within, a narrow courtyard gives access to the temple containing the Fourth Panchen Lama's tomb.

In the 1960s many senior lamas and monastics left Tibet and established new monasteries in India, Nepal and Bhutan. However, the Panchen Lama stayed in Tibet, and many of the senior lamas from the Tashilhunpo Monastery therefore stayed as well. In 1972 a new campus of Tashilhunpo Monastery was built by Tibetan exiles at a settlement in Bylakuppe, Karnātakā, in southern India. Since the early 1980s, parts of the Tashilhunpo Monastery have been open to the public and it is an important tourist attraction in Tibet.

=== Shalu Monastery ===
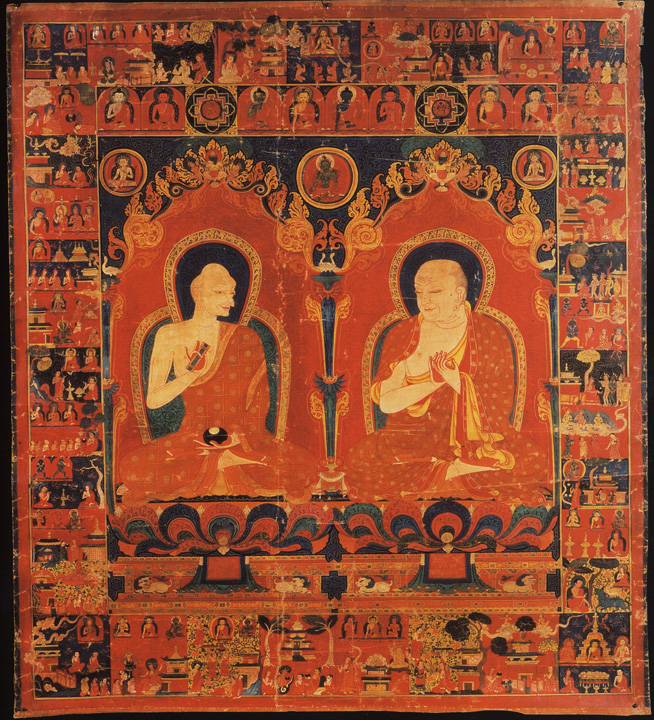
A 14th- century depiction of the 11th Abbot of Shalu, Buton Rinchen Drub (left), and his successor, on a wall painting inside the Shalu Monastery.

The Shalu monastery, established in the 11th century, became famous in the 14th century as a centre of learning under Butön Rinpoche, its abbot. He was an authoritative translator of his times in Tibet and interpreter of Sanskrit Buddhist texts. The title of 'Butön' was prefixed to his name, Rinchen Drup. The monastery was famous for psychic learning of trans-walking and thumo (generating internal heat to survive in cold weather). Located 40 km south of Shigatse, it was also famous for Pala art paintings of the Newari-Tibetan-Mongol school. This art, which developed in the 13th century, is traced to Arniko of the court of Kublai Khan in Beijing. This style influenced art in Northern and Eastern Asia for several centuries. Some of the paintings are still well preserved. Repair and reconstruction of the monastery began in May 2009 to preserve the heritage monument and its famed paintings.

=== Kora ===
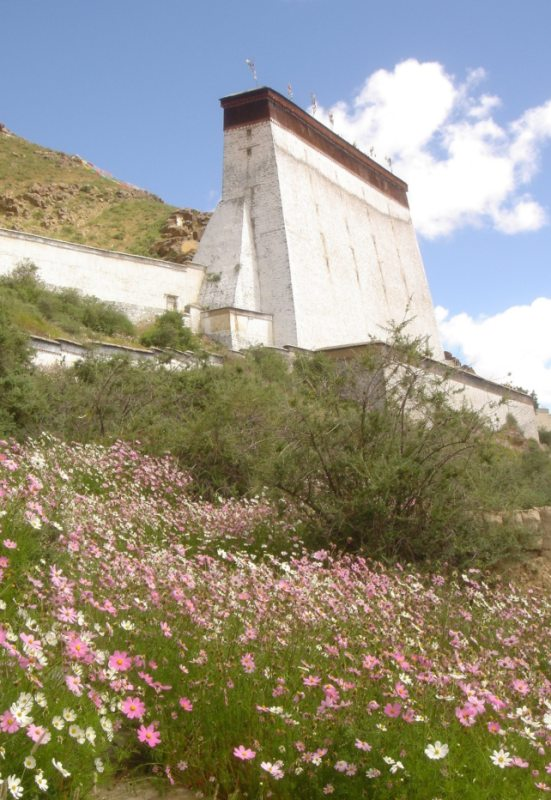
The Thanka Wall along the Kora route where Koku is displayed.

Kora, a pilgrimage and a type of meditation in the Tibetan Buddhist tradition, is performed in Shigatse along a set route covering the Tashilhunpo Monastery, the Mani walls, sacred rocks, a small temple, the Shigatse Dzong, and back to the monastery through the town. It is a walking circumambulation starting with the Tashilhunpo's entrance and moving round along a set route in a clockwise direction. The Kora first covers the boundary wall of the Tashilhunpo Monastery (90 m), then proceeds north to the prayer wheels, climbs up the hills to another row of prayer wheels, passes a large chorten, visits the small Gyelwa Jampa Temple (maroon-coloured) on the right, passes through a series of rocks which are worshipped by pilgrims by rubbing against the rocks and offering incense, tsampa or chang to a sacred fireplace, and then climbs up and passes through a stone edifice in the form of a cinema screen where a large Koku (Thangka religious painting) is displayed on particular occasions (in late July corresponding to the fifth Tibetan month during an annual festival held at Tashilhunpho Monastery). Further up, the route forks towards the Dzong to continue the Kora and is completed past a Mani temple, returning to the entrance of the Tashilhunpho Monastery after passing through the town.
