= Nancy Hansen =

Canadian mountaineer

Nancy Joanne Hansen (born 1968) is a Canadian sport climber and mountaineer. She is an ambassador for the Alpine Club of Canada and has been a professional alpinist for nearly thirty years.

== Life ==
Hansen moved to Canmore, Alberta in 1993 and began climbing in 1995. By 2003, she had summited all 54 of Canada's peaks above 11,000 feet, becoming the first woman, and sixth person ever to do so.

Hansen grew up on a rural property near Edmonton. She fell in love with climbing after a trip to Mount Fay, despite terrible conditions where she nearly became hypothermic. She is known for her mountain, rock and ice climbing in North America, after completing 46 of the 50 routes in the guidebook Fifty Classic Climbs of North America. She has gone on to climb across many regions of the world, including the Himalayas, Antarctica, Thailand, Europe and South America.

In 2010, Hansen, alongside her climbing partners Felix Camire and Doug Fulford were selected by park rangers at Denali National Park to receive the Mislow-Swanson Denali Pro Award, for their assistance in rescuing a guide who was suffering altitude sickness.

In 2014, she won the Guy Lacelle Pure Spirit Award for reaching the "11,000er club". That year, she made plans to climb Mount Everest with Ralf Dujmovits after meeting him at the Banff Mountain Film Festival, where she worked at the time. She travelled to the Alps to train for the attempt via the Norton Couloir. She was attempting to become the first woman from North America to summit the peak without supplementary oxygen. After arriving in the Himalayas, their plans were delayed due to the 2015 Nepali Earthquake. That year she also attempted Gasherbrum IV, but had to turn around at 6,400 after conditions deteriorated.

In 2016, she and Dujmovits attempted the first summit of the unclimbed Praqpa Kangri (7,134m), winning a grant from the Shipton-Tilman grant program to support the climb. The pair were unsuccessful, after a two-month expedition, they reached 6,300 meters before descending due to snow conditions.

The following year, Hansen and Dujmovits traveled to Nepal where they summited the south-west ridge of Cholatse (6,440m) after a seven-day trek.

In 2018, Hansen and Dujmovits took part in a hypoxia study at the German Aerospace Centre to measure the impact of low oxygen environments on the brain. For the study, they spent weeks living at the Centre in a low oxygen environment.

Several years after becoming climbing partners in 2015, Hansen and Dujmovits married, taking their honeymoon in Antarctica. In 2021, the two returned to the Himalayas and made an attempt on the unclimbed Biarchedi I (6,781 m). The pair were unsuccessful after heavy snowfall prevented their summit attempt.
