= Shigatse Photovoltaic Power Plant =

Photovoltaic power station in Tibet, China

Coordinates: 29.3008°N 88.8544°E

The Shigatse Photovoltaic Power Plant (Chinese: 日喀则太阳能光伏电站; pinyin: rìkāzé tàiyángnéng guāngfú diànzhàn) is a solar power plant located 3 km northwest of Shigatse, the second largest city in Tibet, China. It was connected to the grid in July 2011.

== Description ==
The plant sits in the industrial photovoltaic area of Shigatse about 3 km northwest of the city in the Xigaze Prefecture, at an altitude of 3895 meters. According to Suntech CEO, "with intense sunlight and cool temperatures, Tibet is extremely well-suited for the utilisation of advanced photovoltaic technology". Tibet has abundant solar energy with more than 3,000 hours of sunshine annually.

Construction was undertaken by the Linuo Power Group, a provider of solar photovoltaic panels with headquarters in the Shandong province; the province has provided funding under the assistance program "Tibet2". The solar projects are intended to ease local power shortages. Panels are mounted on screw piles driven into the soil to a depth of 1.5 m, thus avoiding the use of concrete slabs.

The plant covers 30 hectares, and was connected to the grid in July 2011. It is expected to produce up to 20 million kWh per year.

In 2012, two other power projects were under construction in the industrial photovoltaic area of Shigatse, one by LDK Solar (60 MW), the other by Chaorisolar (10 MW).

== See also ==
- List of photovoltaic power stations
