= Sanglung =

Unclimbed peak in China

- Location within Tibet

Highest point
- Elevation: 7,095 m (23,278 ft)
- Prominence: 995 m (3,264 ft)
- Coordinates: 29°39′47″N 95°8′8″E

Geography
- Location: China
- Region: Tibet
- Parent range: Himalayas

Climbing
- First ascent: Unclimbed

Sanglung is a mountain peak in the eastern Himalayas. It is 7,095 m (23,278 ft) above sea level and has a promience height of 995 m (3,264 ft). It is located in a relatively isolated part of southeastern Tibet, little visited by foreigners. It is surrounded by the 400 km large gorge formed by the Yarlung Tsangpo River as it crosses the Himalayas, before it becomes the Brahmaputra when it enters India. It is located just over 8 km east of Namcha Barwa, the highest peak of the mountain range.

It is among the highest unclimbed mountains in the world with no recorded ascents.

== See also ==
- Praqpa Kangri
