= Praqpa Kangri =

Unclimbed peak in the Karakoram

Praqpa Kangri – Praqpa Ri
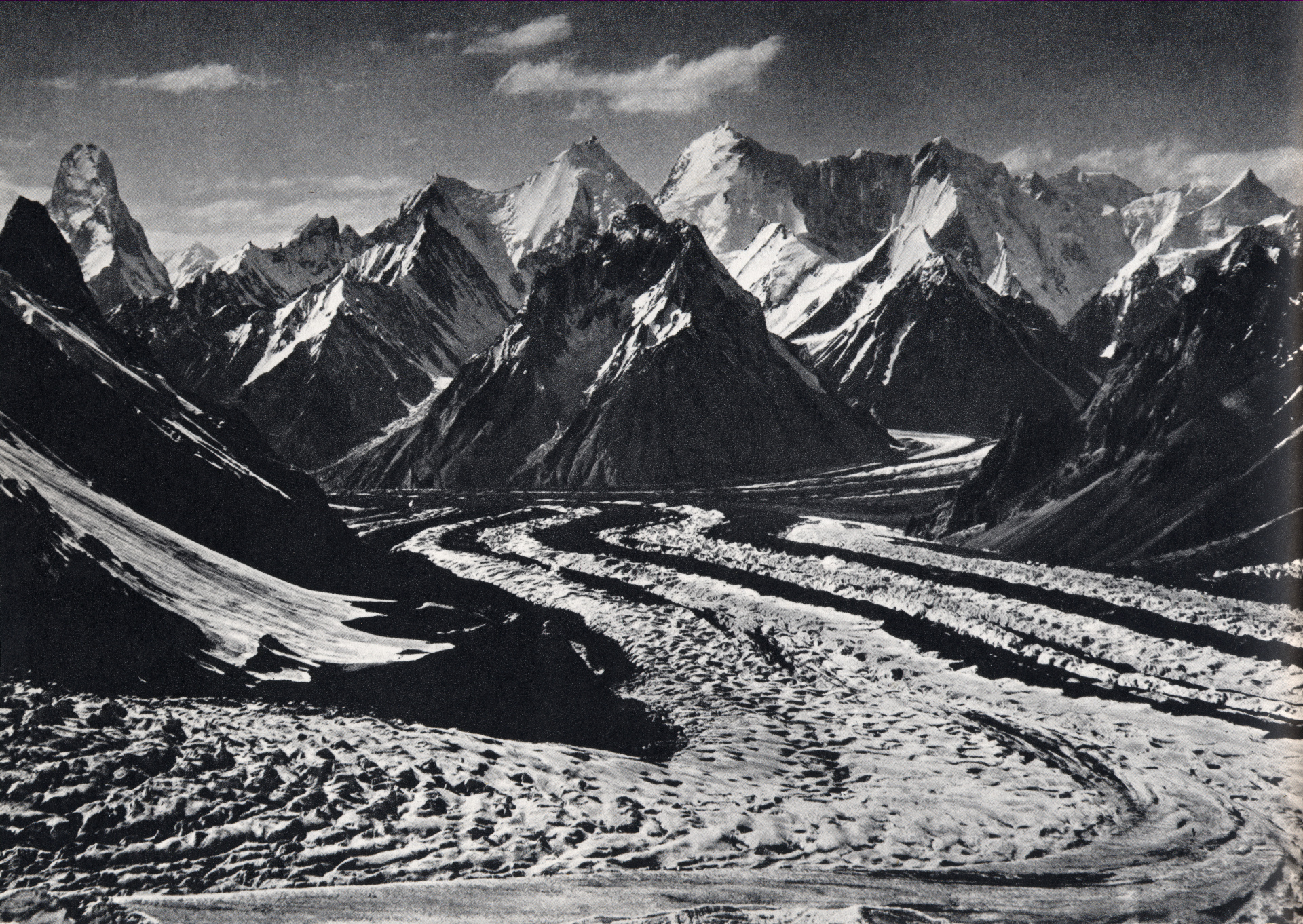
- Praqpa Kangri is just left of the middle of the photo.

Highest point
- Elevation: 7,134 m (23,406 ft)
- Prominence: 233 m (764 ft)
- Listing: Skil Brum
- Coordinates: 35°49′46″N 76°25′59″E

Geography
- Location within Pakistan
- Location: Gilgit-Baltistan (Pakistan)
- Parent range: Baltoro Muztagh

Climbing
- First ascent: Unclimbed

Praqpa Kangri (or Praqpa Ri) is a mountain in Pakistan's Karakoram range in the territory of Gilgit-Baltistan, Pakistan. Praqpa Kangri has an altitude of 7,134 m (some sources put the summit at 7,156 m). The main summit is located 2.33 km south of Skil Brum (7,410 m). The peak's prominence is 668 m. The Savoia glacier flows from the east flank of the mountain towards the Godwin-Austen-Glacier. The Biango Glacier lies to the west of the peak, as do eight-thousanders K2 and Broad Peak.

It is considered one of the world's highest unclimbed mountains, with no successful recorded summits on the main peak as of 2024.

In 2016, Canadian climber Nancy Hansen and German climber Ralf Dujmovits made the first recorded ascent attempt on Praqpa Ri. Hansen received the Hiding in Plain Sight: Unclimbed Summits in the Karakorum award from the Shipton-Tilman Grant program to support the climb. The pair spent two months attempting to climb the peak, ultimately reaching 6,300 m (20,700 ft) before turning back due to poor snow conditions.

In 2021, Martin Sieberer and Simon Messner made a second attempt to climb Praqpa Ri. They were prevented from the summit after reaching 6,000 twice, as the higher sections were impassable due to snow conditions. After returning from the expedition, Messner recounted the steepness of the mountain's slopes are prone to avalanches, requiring good weather to climb safely. He suggested that the increasing risk of climate change meant the likelihood of a successful summit on Praqpa Ri is growing increasingly rare.

Praqpa Kangri North

Highest point
- Elevation: 7,096 m (23,281 ft)
- Prominence: 136 m (446 ft)
- Parent peak: Praqpa Kangri
- Coordinates: 35°49′59″N 76°25′33″E

Geography
- Location: Gilgit-Baltistan

Climbing
- First ascent: Unclimbed

== Subsidiary peaks ==
The mountain has three high points: the main summit, the north summit, and the south summit.

The north summit lies 790 m northwest of the main summit, rising 7,096 m (23,281 ft) in elevation. The prominence between the main peak and this subsidiary peak is 136 m (446 ft).

Praqpa Kangri South

Highest point
- Elevation: 7,089 m (23,258 ft)
- Prominence: 129 m (423 ft)

Geography
- Location: Gilgit-Baltistan

Climbing
- First ascent: 16 July 2017 by Andres Bosch and Armando Montero
- Easiest route: Southeast

The south summit is located 830 m south-southeast of the main summit, reaching a height of 7,089 m (23,258 ft) with a col height of 129 m. In 2017, a Chilean expedition team consisting of Andres Bosch, Alejandro Mora and Armando Montero attempted Praqpa Ri's south peak. On 16 July, Andres Bosch and Armando Montero reached the summit via the Southeast ridge after a 9-day expedition, establishing the route Praqpa Ri South Ridge TD+, 1500 m, M3, 50-90°.
