= Ralf Dujmovits =

German mountaineer

- Born: 5 December 1961 (age 64)
- Occupation: Alpine guide
- Known for: First German to summit all 14 eight-thousanders
- Spouse(s): Gerlinde Kaltenbrunner (m. 2007; div. 2015) Nancy Hansen

Ralf Dujmovits (born 5 December 1961) is a German mountaineer. In May 2009 he became the 16th person, and the first German, to climb the 14 eight-thousanders.

== Early life ==
Dujmovits was born in 1961 in Bühl, Baden-Württemberg. After completing his Abitur (final school exams) in 1981 he spent a year traveling around South America and climbing in the Andes before commencing his degree in medicine at the University of Heidelberg. He left the university after eight semesters and in 1985 began his training to become a certified mountain guide instead.

== Career ==
Dujmovits' mountaineering career began with the German Alpine Club, where he worked as a guide and led clients on international expeditions including highest mountains on six of the seven continents. He also climbed extensively in the Alps, with and without clients, making successful ascents of the Matterhorn, the Eiger, Mont Blanc, the Grosshorn, Les Courtes, Laliderer, the Reissend Nollen, and peaks in the Engelhorn Range. In 1989, he left the German Alpine Club to start up his own trekking outfitter, Amical Alpin.

Dujmovits began climbing in the Himalaya and Karakorum in the 1990s, starting with successful ascents of Dhaulagiri I (1990), Mount Everest (1992), K2 (1994), Cho Oyu (1995), and Shisha Pangma (1997). He began to attract attention from the wider public in 1999, when his climb of the Eiger's north wall in Switzerland was publicized as a 33-hour-long live television broadcast. Dujmovits went on to summit Broad Peak (1999) and Gasherbrum II (2000), but it was not until he climbed Nanga Parbat in 2001 that he decided to attempt to climb all 14 mountains in the world above 8000 meters ("eight-thousanders"). In 2004, he climbed Annapurna I and Gasherbrum I within a two-month period, followed by ascents of Shisha Pangma (2005), Kangchenjunga (2006), Manaslu (2007), Broad Peak (2007), and Makalu (2008). On 20 May 2009, Dujmovits climbed Lhotse—his final 8000-metre peak—with his former wife Gerlinde Kaltenbrunner, Hirotaka Takeuchi and David Göttler. Dujmovits became the 16th person to climb all 14 eight-thousanders, and the first German person to do so.

Dujmovits returned to Mount Everest in 2012 for the sixth time, attempting to climb it without bottled oxygen (Mount Everest is the only eight-thousander he has not climbed without bottled oxygen). Although he did not reach the summit, while he was descending he took a photo of a long queue of climbers queuing to ascend the mountain; the photo subsequently went viral and was described by Outside magazine as "the year's most iconic photo" and "the image that embodied a disastrous year on Everest". In 2014, he and Darek Zaluski attempted to make the first winter ascent of Nanga Parbat, but abandoned the expedition, citing dangerous conditions.

Dujmovits has made more than 40 mountaineering expeditions in the Himalaya and Karakorum. In addition to climbing all 14 eight-thousanders, he has completed the Seven Summits challenge, which involves climbing the highest mountains on each continent.

== Personal life ==
Dujmovits lives in the Black Forest, Germany.

In 2007, Dujmovits married his mountaineering partner Gerlinde Kaltenbrunner. They divorced in 2015. Later he married Canadian climber Nancy Hansen.
