= Shigatse =

Shigatse 日喀则市 གཞིས་ཀ་རྩེ་གྲོང་ཁྱེར། Xigazê
- Prefecture-level city
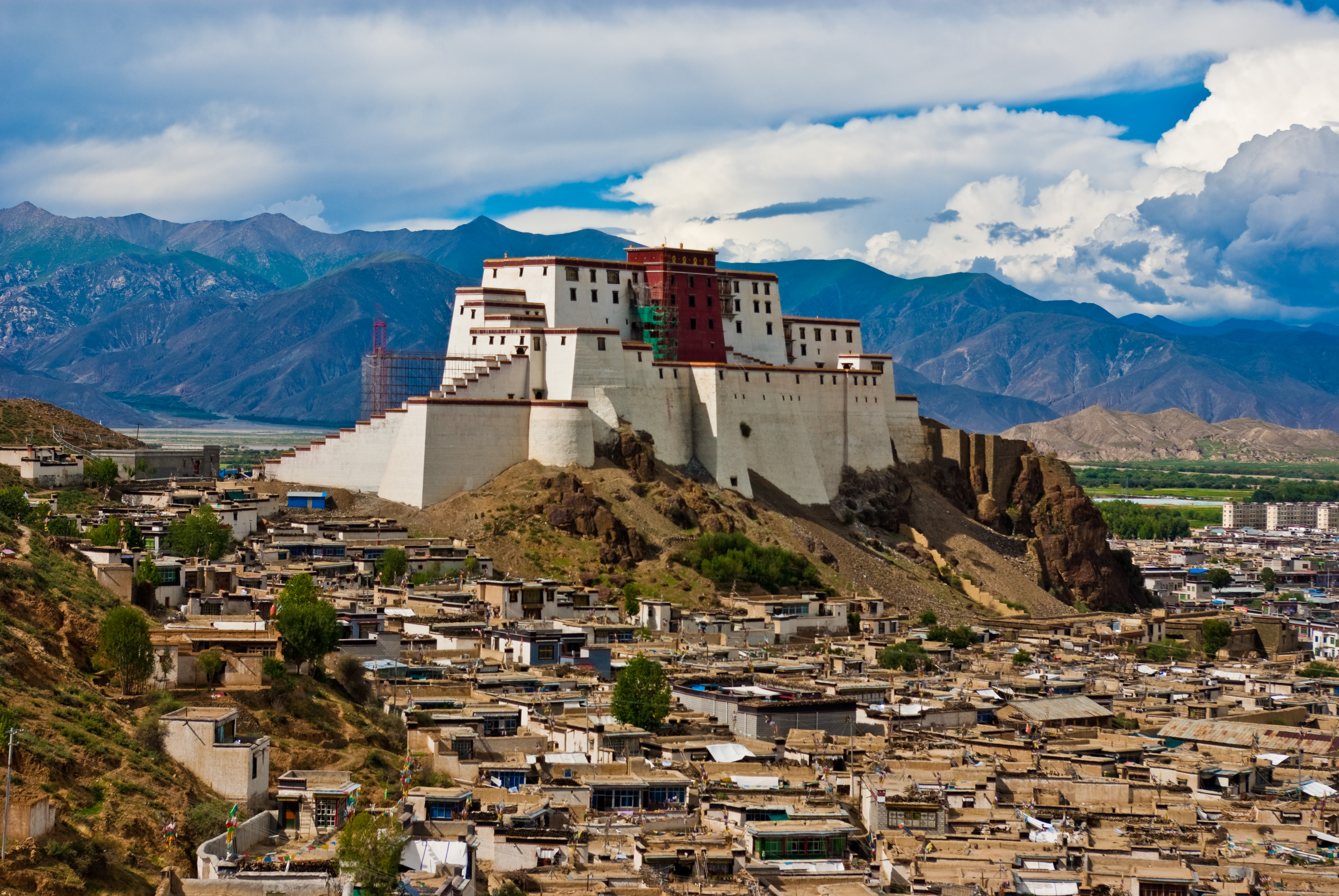
- Samdruptse Dzong
- Nickname: Gateway to Everest
- Location of Shigatse within Tibet
- Coordinates: 29°16′01″N 88°52′52″E
- Country: People's Republic of China
- Autonomous region: Tibet
- County-level divisions: 1 district; 17 counties
- Municipal seat: Samzhubzê District

Area
  - Total: 182,000 km^{2} (70,000 sq mi)

Population (2020)
  - Total: 798,153
  - Density: 4.39/km^{2} (11.4/sq mi)

GDP
  - Total: CN¥ 16.7 billion US$ 2.7 billion
  - Per capita: CN¥ 22,469; US$ 3,608
- Time zone: UTC+8 (China Standard)
- ISO 3166 code: CN-XZ-02

Shigatse

Chinese name
- Simplified Chinese: 日喀则
- Traditional Chinese: 日喀則
- Hanyu Pinyin: Rìkāzé
Transcriptions
Standard Mandarin
- Hanyu Pinyin: Rìkāzé
- Bopomofo: ㄖˋ ㄎㄚ ㄗㄜˊ
- Gwoyeu Romatzyh: Ryhkatzer
- Wade–Giles: Jih^{4}-kʻa^{1}-tsê^{2}
- Tongyong Pinyin: Rìhkazé
- Yale Romanization: R̀kādzé
- IPA: [ɻɻ̩̂.kʰá.tsɤ̌]

Tibetan name
- Tibetan: གཞིས་ཀ་རྩེ་
Transcriptions
- Wylie: gzhis ka rtse
- Tibetan Pinyin: Xigazê
- Lhasa IPA: /ɕi˩˨.kə˥˥.t͡seˑ/

Shigatse, officially known as Xigazê (Tibetan: གཞིས་ཀ་རྩེ་, Wylie: gzhis ka rtse, ZWPY: xigazê) or Rikaze (Chinese: 日喀则; pinyin: Rìkāzé), is a prefecture-level city in the south-central and southwestern parts of the Tibet Autonomous Region of the People's Republic of China. Its area of jurisdiction, with an area of 182,000 km^{2} (70,271 sq mi), corresponds to the historical Ü-Tsang region of Tibet, and is most notable for containing the Chinese half of Mount Everest.

== Overview ==
The administrative center of the prefecture-level city is the Samzhubzê District. It is roughly equivalent to the historical Shigatse urban center, Tibet's second-largest city, about 280 km (170 mi) southwest of Lhasa and home to the Tashilhunpo Monastery, traditionally the seat of the Panchen Lama.

Towns in the prefecture include Gyantse (Gyantse County), Tingri (Tingri County), and Nyalam (Nyalam County).

On 11 July 2014 Shigatse Prefecture was upgraded into a prefecture-level city (the same status as Lhasa).

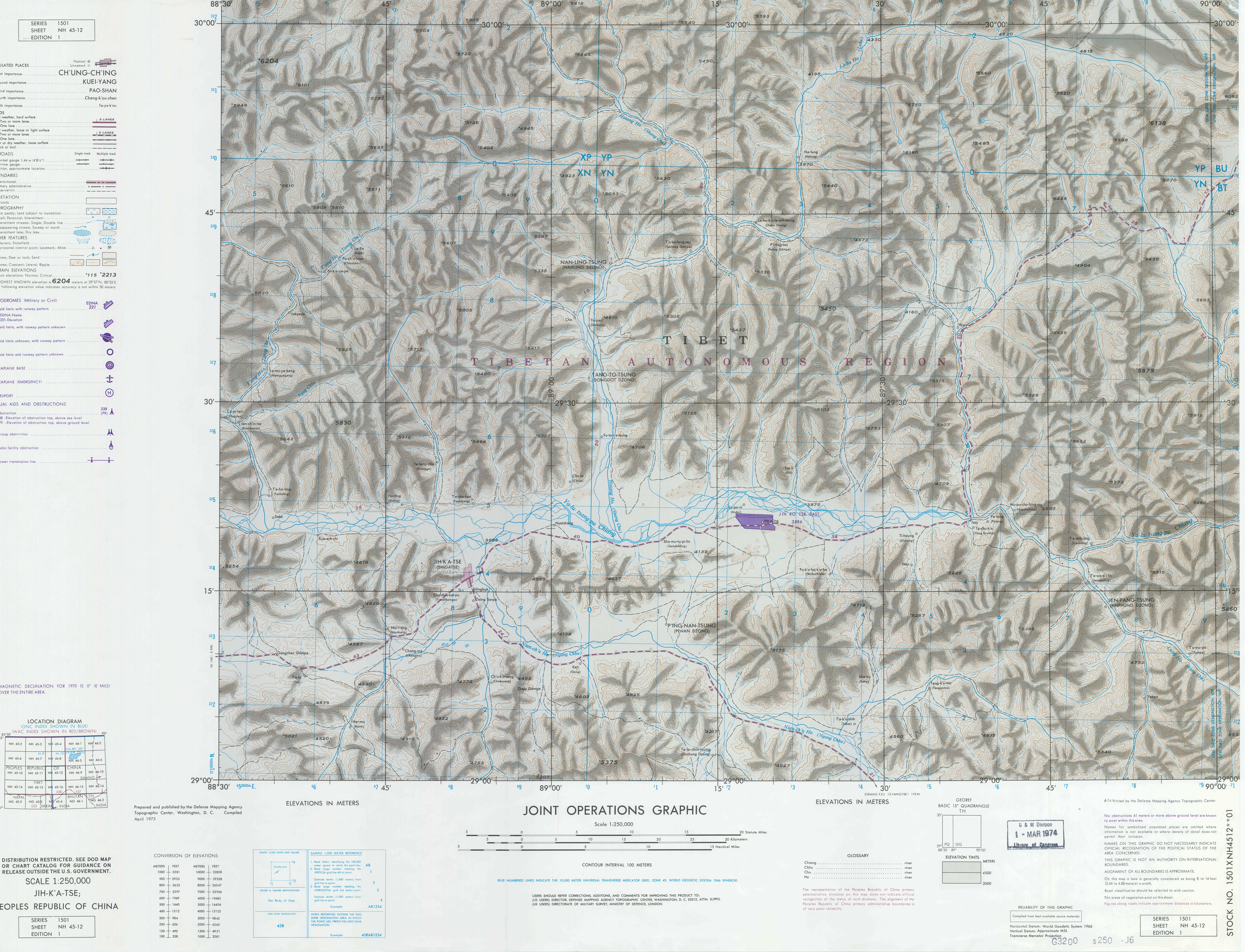
Map including Shigatse (Jih-k'a-tse) (DMA, 1973)

== History ==
In the 8th century, the Tibetan Empire of King Trisong Detsen invited the Indian monk Padmasambhava into Tibet to build the Samye monastery, and predicted Lhasa as the center of the snowy plateau, followed by Shigatse. In the 11th century, during the Sakya dynasty, Shigatse began urbanization.

In October 1959, Rikaze prefecture was established. In 1970, Rikaze Prefecture was abolished and Rikaze District was established. On 26 June 2014, the State Council of the People's Republic of China abolished the original Rikaze area and established prefecture-level Shigatse city. The original county-level Shigatse city merged into the Sangzhuzi District. This was the second prefecture-level city established in the Tibet Autonomous Region.

Prefecture-level Shigatse City was officially established on 18 December 2014.

== Population ==
According to the 2020 Chinese census, the resident population of the city was 798,153. Compared to 703,292 in the 6th Chinese Census, there was a total increase of 94,861 or 13.49% in ten years, with an average annual growth rate of 1.27%. Among them, the male population was 416,384, 52.17% of the total, while the female population was 381,769, or 47.83%. The sex ratio of the total population (100 females) was 109.07. The population aged 0–14 years was 209,900, accounting for 26.3% of the total; the population aged 15–59 years was 516,838, accounting for 64.75% of the total; and the population aged 60 years and above was 71,415, accounting for 8.95% of the total. 44,772 were aged 65 and above, accounting for 5.61% of the total. The population living in towns and cities was 184,323, or 23.09% of the total, while the population living in villages was 613,830, or 76.91% of the total.

=== Ethnicity ===
Of the city's resident population, 42,501, or 5.32%, were Han Chinese; 748,443, or 93.77%, were Tibetans; and 7,209, or 0.9%, were other ethnic minorities. Compared with the 2010 Chinese Census, the Han population increased by 16,691, or 64.67%, and accounted for 1.66 percentage points of the total population; the populations of various ethnic minorities increased by 78,170, or 11.54%, and accounted for 1.66 percentage points of the total population. Among them, the Tibetan population increased by 76,779, an increase of 11.43%, accounting for a decrease of 1.73 percentage points in the proportion of the total population.According to the population sample survey, the total resident population of the city by the end of 2024 will be 814,500. Among them, the urban population is 203,600, accounting for 25% of the resident population.

Ethnic composition of Shigatse (November 2010)
Ethnic Group	Tibetan	Han	Kirghiz	Hui	Unidentified Ethnic Groups	Kazakh	Tu	Dongxiang	Manchu	Hmong	Other Ethnic Groups
Population	671664	25810	2669	1434	703	250	162	138	98	66	298
Proportion of total population (%)	95.50	3.67	0.38	0.20	0.10	0.04	0.02	0.02	0.01	0.01	0.04
Proportion of ethnic minority population (%)	99.14	---	0.39	0.21	0.10	0.04	0.02	0.02	0.01	0.01	0.04

== Transport ==
=== Rail ===
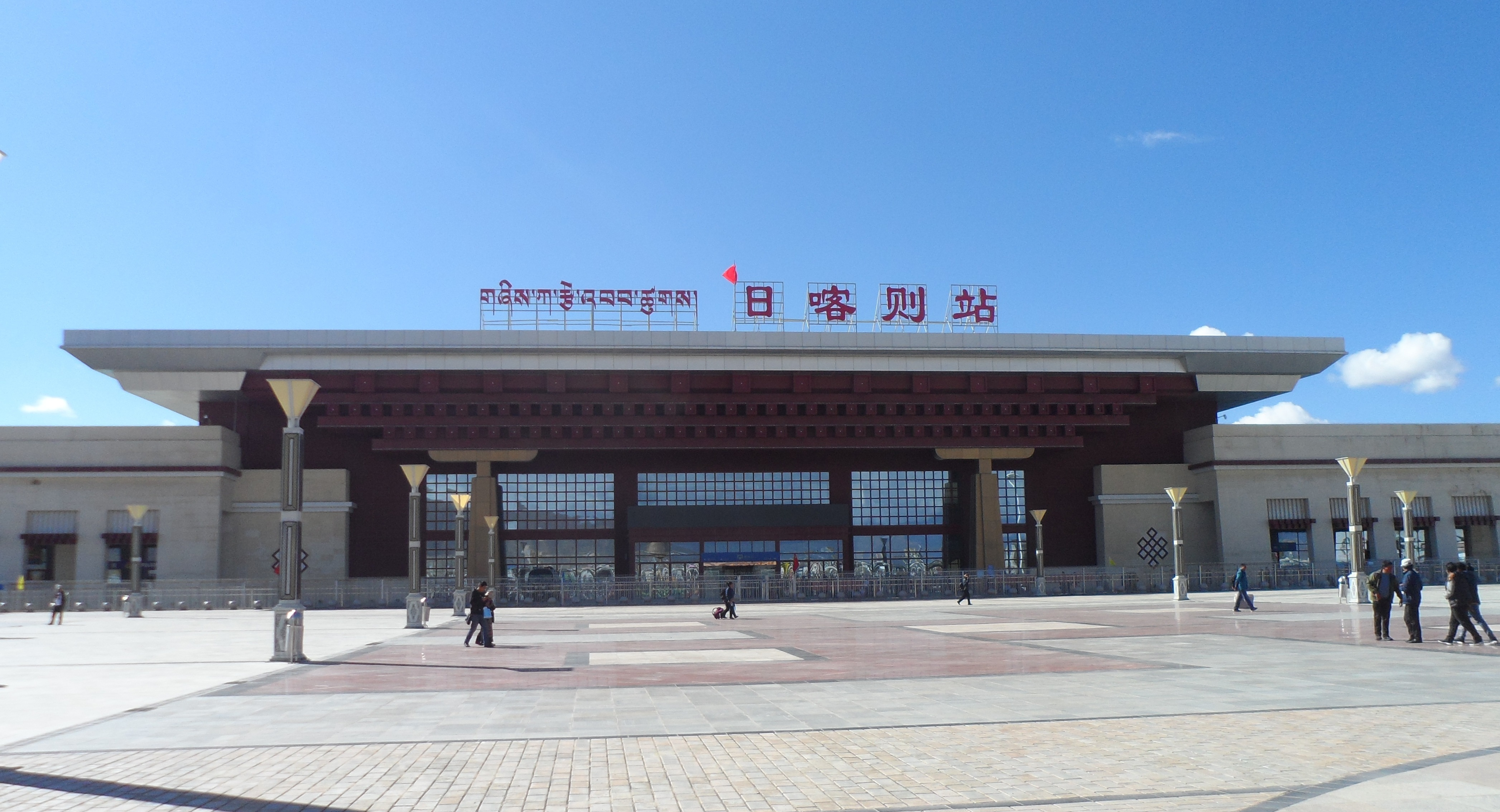
Shigatse Railway Station

The Lhasa–Shigatse Railway connects Shigatse Railway Station with Lhasa and further connects with Qinghai via Qinghai–Tibet Railway. It takes about three hours to travel between Lhasa and Shigatse by train. It is possible to get back to Lhasa within the same day by train.

=== Air ===
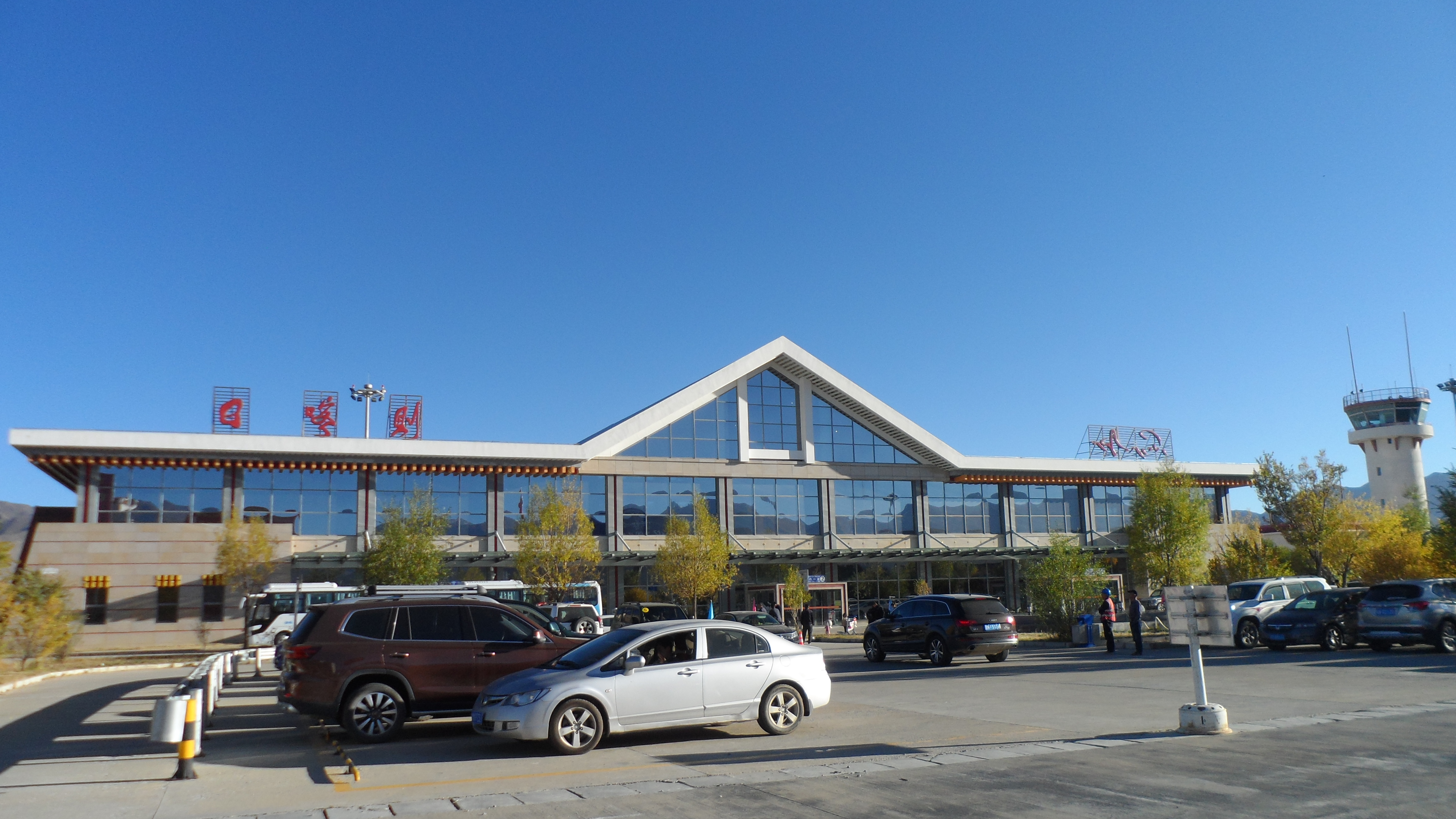
Shigatse Peace Airport

Shigatse Peace Airport began operations on 30 October 2010 after an Airbus A319 landed safely, making it Tibet's fifth commercial airport. It is 43 kilometres from Samzhubzê District at Jangdam Township at an elevation of 3,782 metres. The airport sees about 230,000 passengers annually.

Shigatse Tingri Airport opened in 2022.

=== Road ===
China National Highway 318 and China National Highway 219 are the main roads in and out of Shigatse.

== Administrative divisions ==
Map
Name	Simplified Chinese	Hanyu Pinyin	Tibetan	Wylie	Population (2010 Census)	Area (km^{2})	Density (/km^{2})
City proper
Samzhubzê District	桑珠孜区	Sāngzhūzī Qū	བསམ་འགྲུབ་རྩེ་ཆུས།	bsam 'grub rtse chus	120,374	3,654	32.94
Rural
Namling County	南木林县	Nánmùlín Xiàn	རྣམ་གླིང་རྫོང་།	rnam gling rdzong	74,930	8,113	9.23
Gyantse County	江孜县	Jiāngzī Xiàn	རྒྱལ་རྩེ་རྫོང་།	rgyal rtse rdzong	63,503	3,859	16.45
Tingri County	定日县	Dìngrì Xiàn	དིང་རི་རྫོང་།	ding ri rdzong	50,818	13,859	3.66
Sa'gya County	萨迦县	Sàjiā Xiàn	ས་སྐྱ་རྫོང་།	sa skya rdzong	47,304	7,510	6.29
Lhatse County	拉孜县	Lāzī Xiàn	ལྷ་རྩེ་རྫོང་།	lha rtse rdzong	49,286	4,505	10.94
Ngamring County	昂仁县	Ángrén Xiàn	ངམ་རིང་རྫོང་།	ngam ring rdzong	51,472	20,105	2.56
Xaitongmoin County	谢通门县	Xiètōngmén Xiàn	བཞད་མཐོང་སྨོན་རྫོང་།	bzhad mthong smon rdzong	42,280	13,960	3.02
Bainang County	白朗县	Báilǎng Xiàn	པ་སྣམ་རྫོང་།	pa snam rdzong	42,551	2,806	15.16
Rinbung County	仁布县	Rénbù Xiàn	རིན་སྤུངས་རྫོང་།	rin spungs rdzong	27,826	2,123	13.10
Kangmar County	康马县	Kāngmǎ Xiàn	ཁང་དམར་རྫོང་།	khang dmar rdzong	20,522	6,165	3.32
Dinggyê County	定结县	Dìngjié Xiàn	གཏིང་སྐྱེས་རྫོང་།	gding skyes rdzong	20,319	5,816	3.49
Zhongba County	仲巴县	Zhòngbā Xiàn	འབྲོང་པ་རྫོང་།	'brong pa rdzong	22,147	43,594	0.50
Yadong County	亚东县	Yàdōng Xiàn	གྲོ་མོ་རྫོང་།	gro mo rdzong	12,920	4,306	3.00
Gyirong County	吉隆县	Jílóng Xiàn	སྐྱིད་གྲོང་རྫོང་།	skyid grong rdzong	14,972	9,009	1.66
Nyalam County	聂拉木县	Nièlāmù Xiàn	གཉའ་ལམ་རྫོང་།	gnya' lam rdzong	17,568	7,903	2.22
Saga County	萨嘎县	Sàgā Xiàn	ས་དགའ་རྫོང་།	sa dga' rdzong	14,036	12,411	1.13
Kamba County	岗巴县	Gǎngbā Xiàn	གམ་པ་རྫོང་།	gam pa rdzong	10,464	3,936	2.65

== Climate ==
Shigatse has an elevation-influenced monsoonal humid continental climate (Köppen climate classification: Dwb, Trewartha Dclo) When using the −3 °C (27 °F) isotherm, Shigatse has a subtropical highland climate (Köppen climate classification: Cwb, Trewartha Dolo).

Climate data for Shigatse, elevation 3,836 m (12,585 ft), (1991–2020 normals, extremes 1971–2000)
Month	Jan	Feb	Mar	Apr	May	Jun	Jul	Aug	Sep	Oct	Nov	Dec	Year
Record high °C (°F)	18.6 (65.5)	18.8 (65.8)	22.9 (73.2)	23.9 (75.0)	28.5 (83.3)	28.2 (82.8)	28.2 (82.8)	26.2 (79.2)	24.4 (75.9)	22.2 (72.0)	21.1 (70.0)	17.3 (63.1)	28.5 (83.3)
Mean daily maximum °C (°F)	7.0 (44.6)	9.0 (48.2)	12.5 (54.5)	16.0 (60.8)	19.9 (67.8)	22.9 (73.2)	21.8 (71.2)	21.0 (69.8)	20.0 (68.0)	16.7 (62.1)	11.9 (53.4)	8.4 (47.1)	15.6 (60.1)
Daily mean °C (°F)	−2.6 (27.3)	0.5 (32.9)	4.6 (40.3)	8.1 (46.6)	12.0 (53.6)	15.3 (59.5)	14.9 (58.8)	14.1 (57.4)	12.6 (54.7)	7.4 (45.3)	1.2 (34.2)	−2.5 (27.5)	7.1 (44.8)
Mean daily minimum °C (°F)	−12.2 (10.0)	−8.9 (16.0)	−4.0 (24.8)	0.4 (32.7)	4.5 (40.1)	8.6 (47.5)	9.8 (49.6)	9.2 (48.6)	6.8 (44.2)	−0.8 (30.6)	−8.0 (17.6)	−11.9 (10.6)	−0.5 (31.0)
Record low °C (°F)	−21.3 (−6.3)	−19.4 (−2.9)	−14.4 (6.1)	−9.5 (14.9)	−4.9 (23.2)	0.6 (33.1)	2.2 (36.0)	0.5 (32.9)	−1.6 (29.1)	−9.8 (14.4)	−15.5 (4.1)	−18.6 (−1.5)	−21.3 (−6.3)
Average precipitation mm (inches)	0.1 (0.00)	0.4 (0.02)	0.6 (0.02)	5.2 (0.20)	20.7 (0.81)	66.0 (2.60)	149.8 (5.90)	145.2 (5.72)	52.0 (2.05)	3.7 (0.15)	0.5 (0.02)	0.5 (0.02)	444.7 (17.51)
Average precipitation days (≥ 0.1 mm)	0.3	0.4	0.8	2.6	6.1	12.6	20.2	20.7	12.5	1.8	0.3	0.1	78.4
Average snowy days	0.6	1.2	1.7	4.3	1.6	0.1	0	0	0	0.6	0.6	0.4	11.1
Average relative humidity (%)	28	25	25	32	40	50	64	68	61	44	34	33	42
Mean monthly sunshine hours	260.4	244.0	280.0	278.5	301.8	278.6	227.4	222.5	247.5	286.3	276.5	267.8	3,171.3
Percentage possible sunshine	80	77	75	72	71	67	54	55	68	82	87	84	73
Source 1: China Meteorological Administration
Source 2: Weather China

== Gallery ==
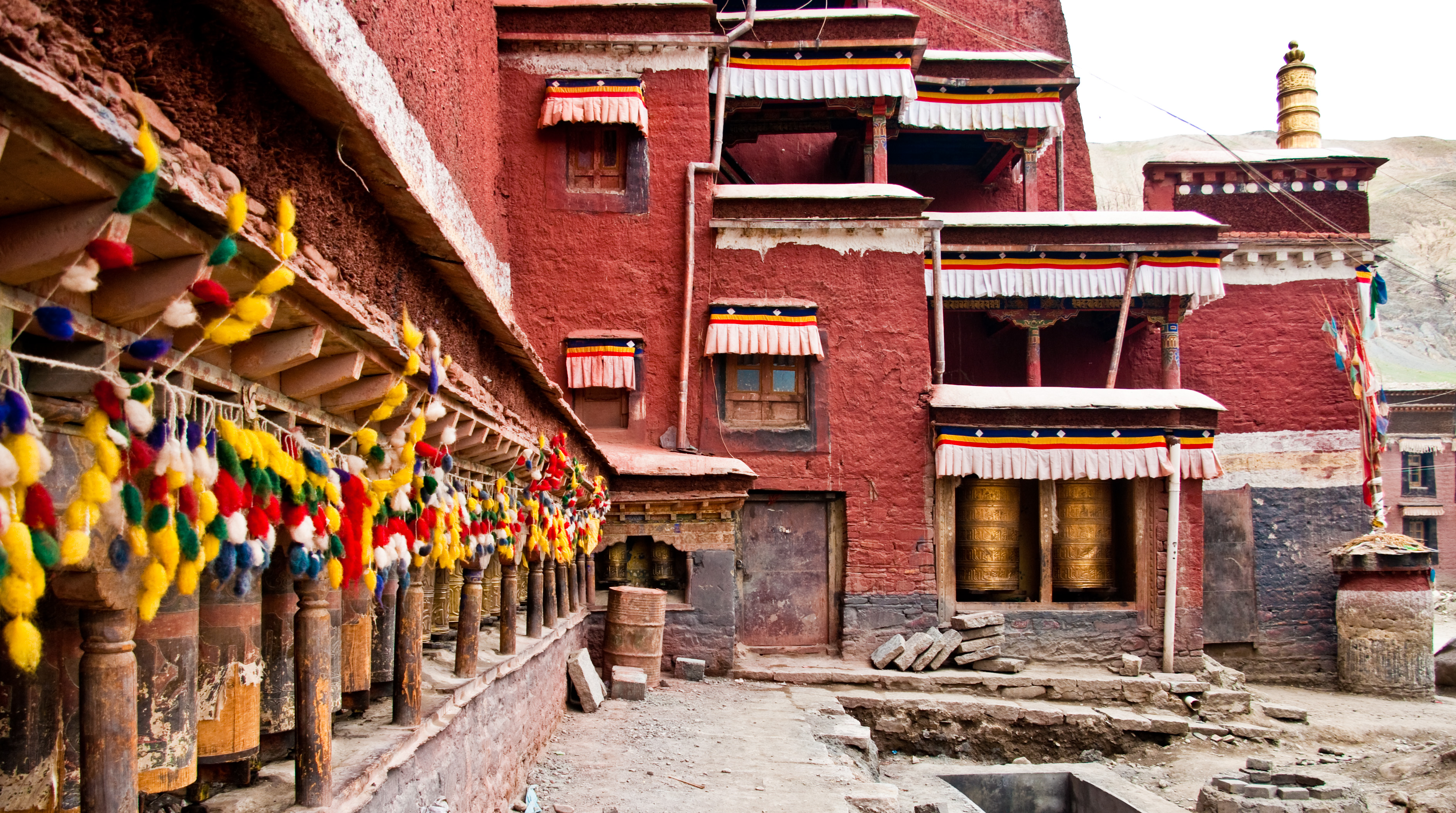
Sakya Monastery

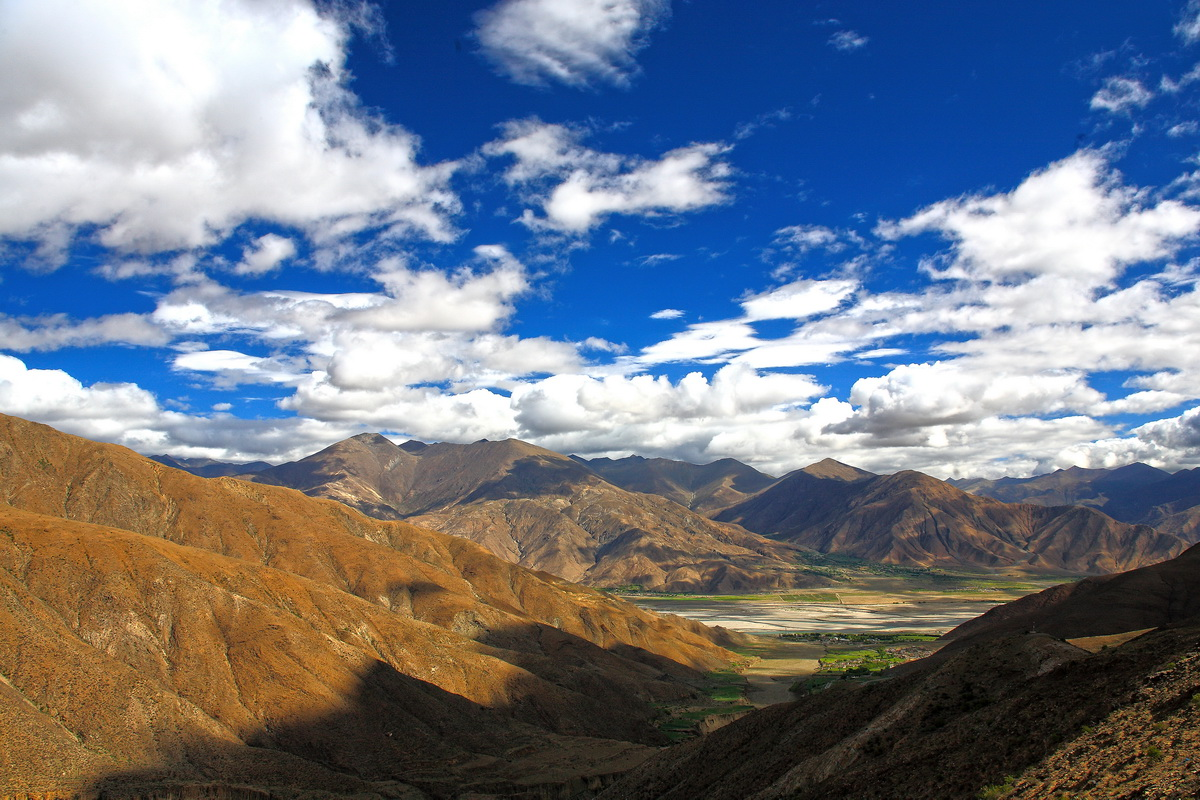
Mountains in Shigatse Prefecture

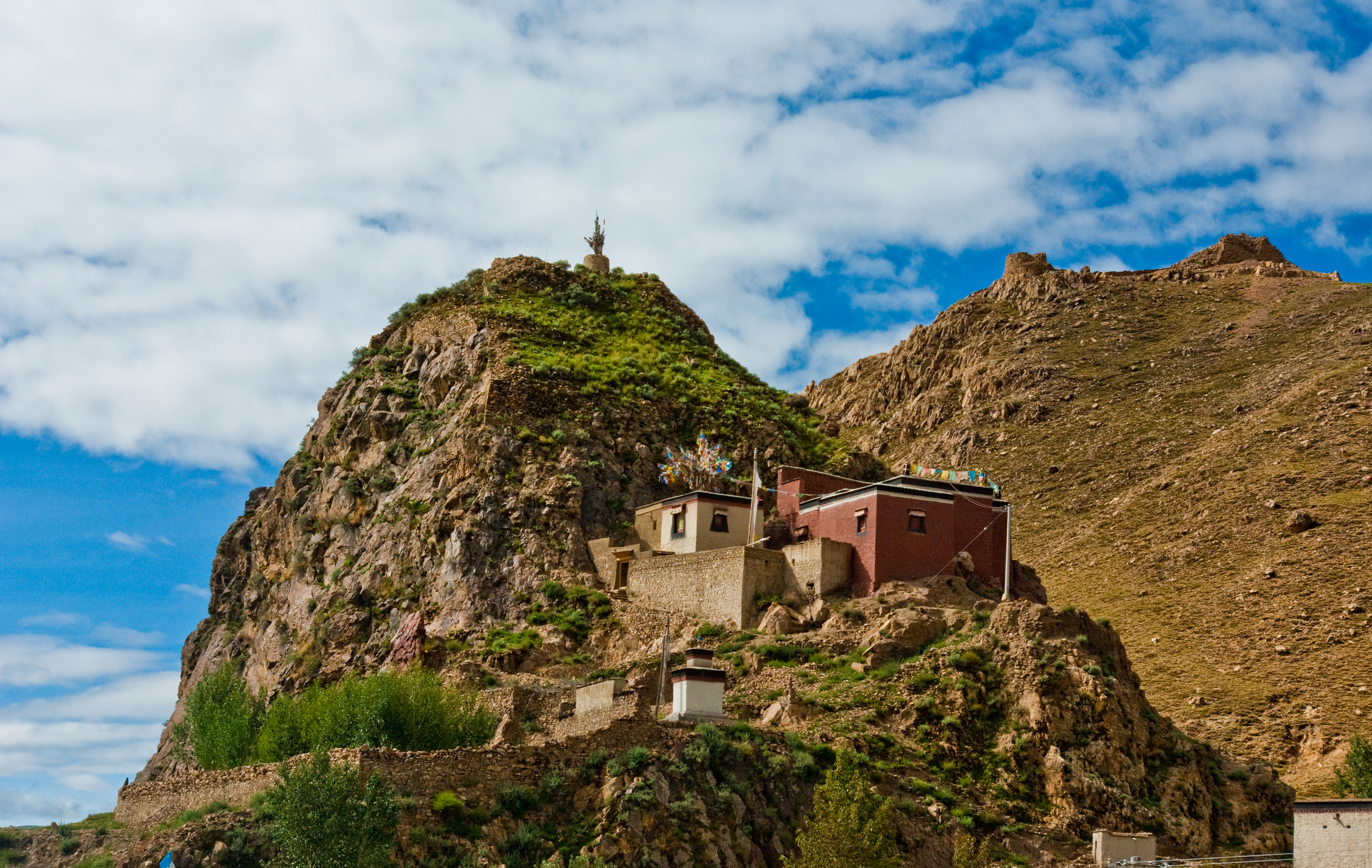
Monastery along the road from Shigatse to Mount Everest

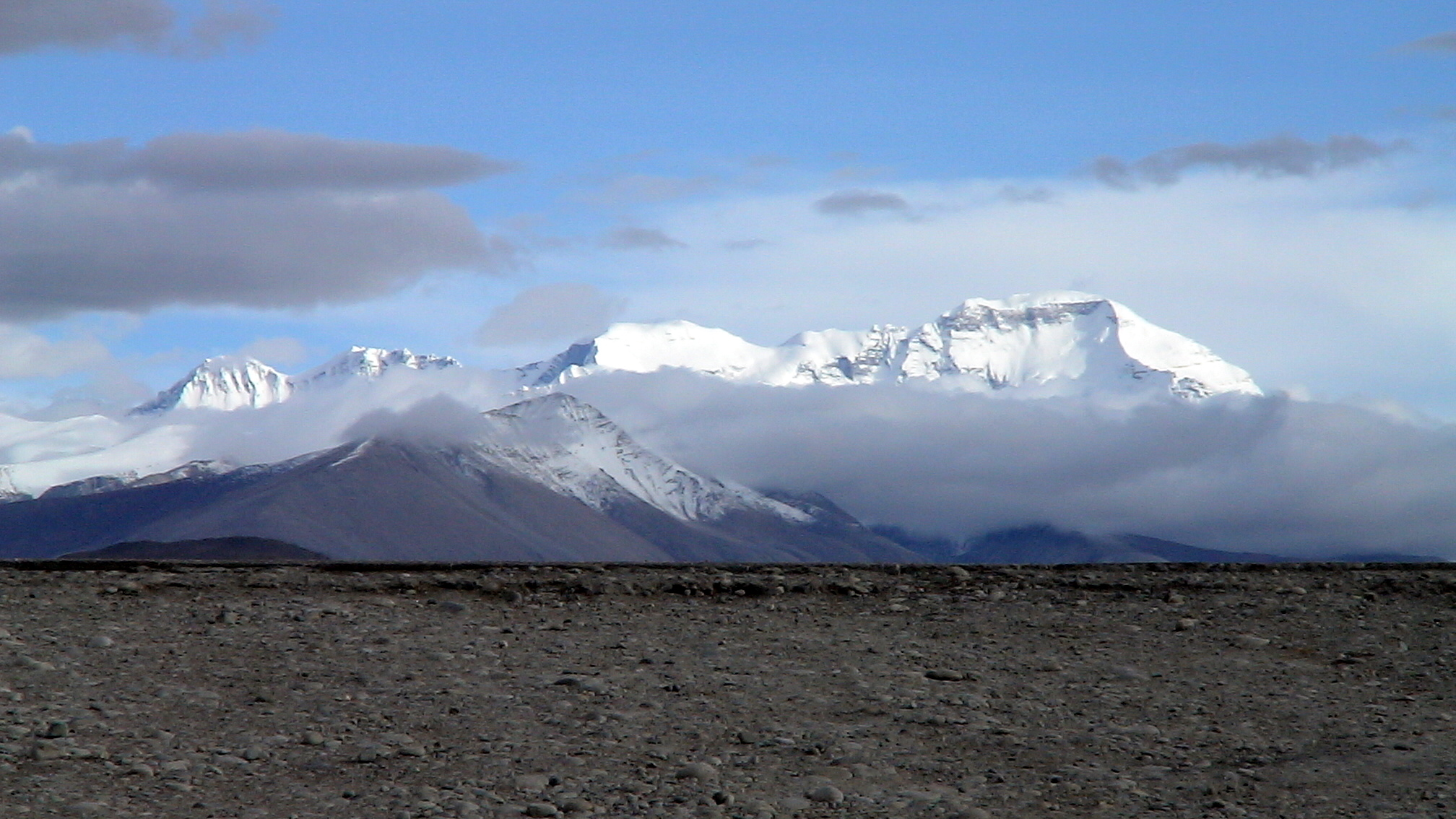
Cho Oyu from Tingri

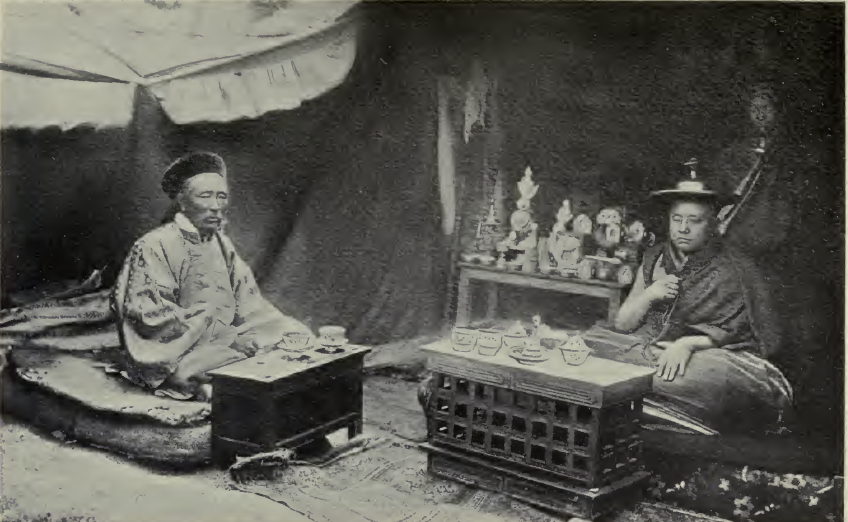
Photo of the Shigatse abbot taken around 1910

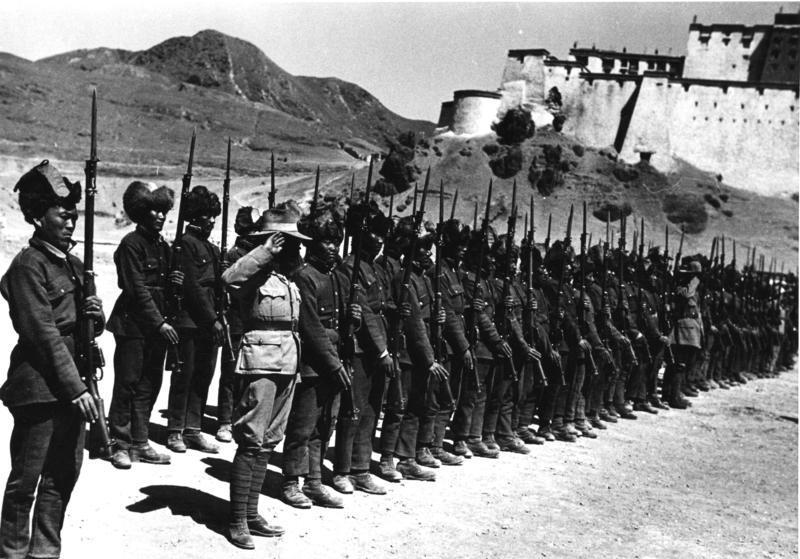
Tibetan Army soldiers circa 1938 on parade. They are equipped with Lee-Enfield rifles.

== See also ==
- Shigatse Photovoltaic Power Plant
- Shigatse People's Hospital
