= Summa Ri =

Mountain peaks

Summa Ri I & II
- Summa Ri I

Highest point
- Elevation: 7,286 m (23,904 ft)
- Prominence: 246 m (807 ft)
- Coordinates: 35°51′52″N 76°27′2″E

Geography
- Location within Pakistan Location within Gilgit Baltistan
- 1 Summa Ri I (7,286 m /23,904 ft); 2 Summa Ri II (7,133 m /23,402 ft) Location in Gilgit-Baltistan
- Location: Karakoram

Climbing
- First ascent: Unclimbed

Summa Ri (also known as Summa Ri I & II) comprises two of the sub-peaks of Skil Brum (7,410 m) in the Hindu Kush-Karakoram range. It is on the border between Gilgit-Baltistan region of Pakistan-administered Kashmir and Xinjiang Autonomous Region in China.

== Location ==
Summa Ri I has a height of 7,286 m (23,904 ft) and a prominence of 246 m (807 ft). The summit is located 2.39 km northeast of the Skil Brum, the 66th highest mountain in the world. The Savoy Glacier flows from the eastern flank of the mountain in an easterly direction to the Godwin-Austen Glacier. (Coordinates: 35° 51' 52'' N, 76° 27' 2'' E)

Summa Ri II has a height of 7,133 m (23,402 ft) and at a prominence of 53 m (174 ft). This peak is located at the west of Summa Ri I. (Coordinates: 35° 51' 41'' N, 76° 26' 18'' E)

Both Summa Ri I and Summa Ri II are considered to be among the highest unclimbed peaks.
