= Labuche Kang =

Mountain in Tibet, China

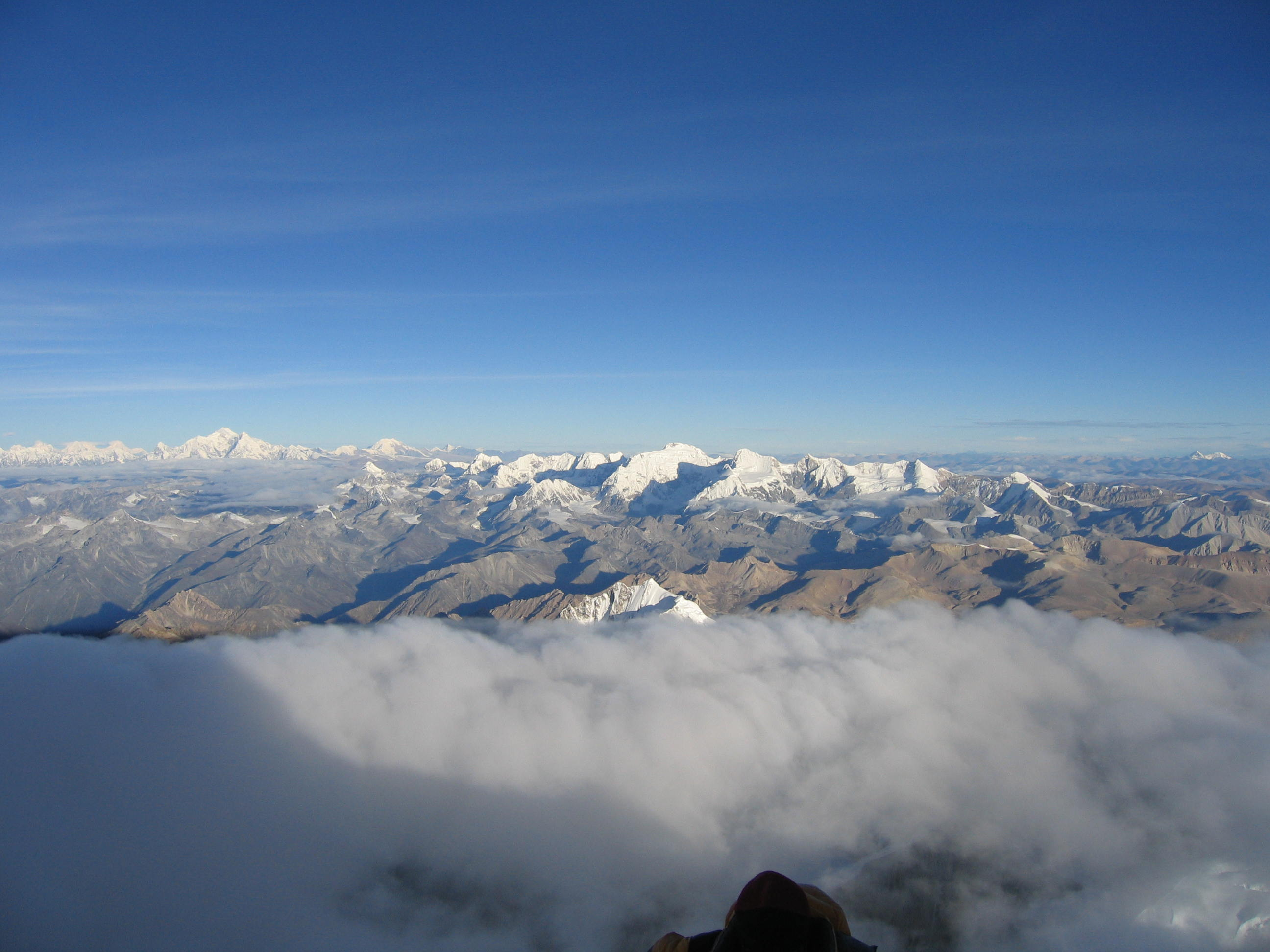
- Labuche Kang (Centre) and Shishapangma (left) as seen from Cho Oyu

Highest point
- Elevation: 7,367 m (24,170 ft); Ranked 75th
- Prominence: 1,957 m (6,421 ft)
- Listing: Ultra; Mountains of China
- Coordinates: 28°18′15″N 86°21′03″E

Geography
- Location within Tibet
- Country: China
- Region: Tibet
- Parent range: Labuche Himal, Himalaya

Climbing
- First ascent: October 26, 1987 by A. Deuchi, H. Furukawa, K. Sudo (Japanese); Diaqiog, Gyala, Lhaji, Wanjia (Chinese)
- Easiest route: West Ridge: glacier/snow climb

Labuche Kang (or Lapche Kang, Lobuche Kang I, Choksiam) is a northern outlier of the Himalayas inside Tibet. It rises northwest of Rolwaling Himal and east of Shishapangma. The peak belongs to a little-known section of the Himalaya variously called Labuche Himal, Pamari Himal and Lapchi Kang that extends from the valley of the Tamakosi River west to the valley of the Sun Kosi and Nyalam Tong La pass where Arniko-Friendship Highway cross the Himalaya. This section extends south into Nepal east of Arniko Highway. It is wholly within the catchment of the Kosi, a Ganges tributary.

Labuche Kang was first climbed in 1987 by a Sino-Japanese expedition, via the West Ridge. No other attempts are recorded until September 2010 when American climber Joe Puryear fell to his death during an unsuccessful attempt.

== See also ==
- List of highest mountains
- List of ultras of the Himalayas

Media related to Labuche Himal at Wikimedia Commons
