= Nyalam Town =

Nyalam Town གཉའ་ལམ་གྲོང་བརྡལ · 聂拉木镇
- Town
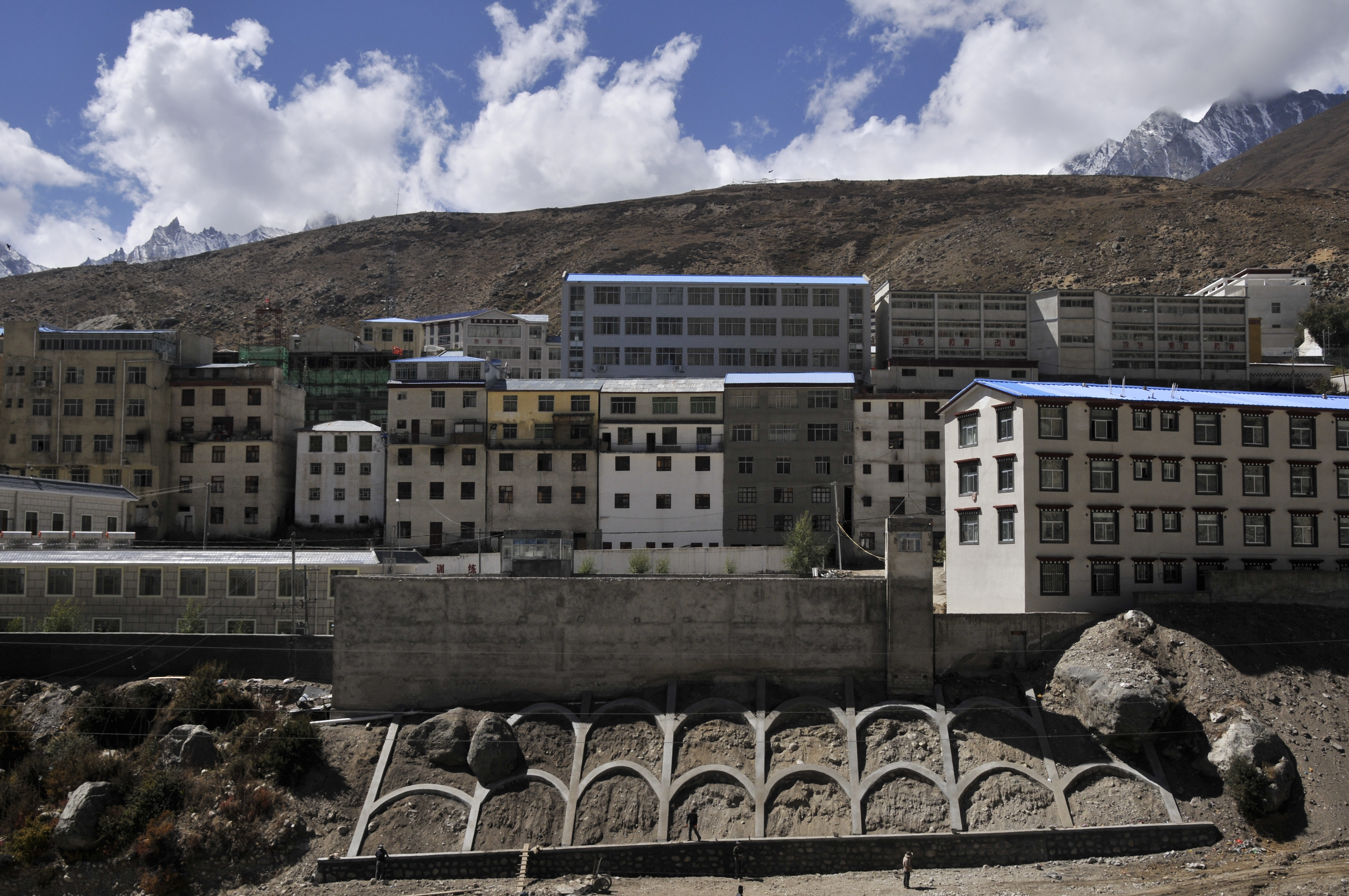

- Location within Tibet
- Coordinates (Nyalam Town government): 28°09′26″N 85°58′45″E
- Country: People's Republic of China
- Autonomous region: Tibet
- Prefecture-level city: Shigatse
- Elevation: 3,750 m (12,300 ft)

Nyalam Town

Chinese name
- Traditional Chinese: 聶拉木鎮
- Simplified Chinese: 聂拉木镇
Transcriptions
Standard Mandarin
- Hanyu Pinyin: Nièlāmù Zhèn

Tibetan name
- Tibetan: གཉའ་ལམ་གྲོང་བརྡལ
Transcriptions
- Wylie: gnya' lam grong brdal
- Tibetan Pinyin: Nyalam Chongdai

Nyalam (Tibetan: གཉའ་ལམ; Chinese: 聂拉木) is a small town in and the county seat of Nyalam County in the Shigatse Prefecture of the Tibet Autonomous Region, near the Nepal border. It is 35 km from Zhangmu town in the same county, which is the point of entry to Nepal. Nyalam is situated at 3,750 metres (12,300 ft) above sea level.

Once a town of stone buildings and tin roofs, Nyalam was known as Tsongdu (Tibetan: ཚོང་འདུས) and was part of the historical Tsang Province of Tibet before the annexation by China. Nepalese trans-himalayan traders called it Kuti (Nepali: कुती) and also 'The Gate of Hell' because the old trail down to the Nepalese border was very treacherous.

Today Nyalam is a fast-growing little town made of concrete buildings located on the Friendship Highway between Lhasa and the Nepal border. South of Nyalam the road drops abruptly through the gorge of the Matsang Tsangpo (a.k.a. Poiqu, Bhotekoshi River), which is the upper section or main tributary of Sun Kosi in Nepal. The town is about 40 km from the Nepalese border and 150 km from Kathmandu.

== See also ==
- Milarepa's Cave, Nyalam
- China National Highway 318
- Friendship Highway
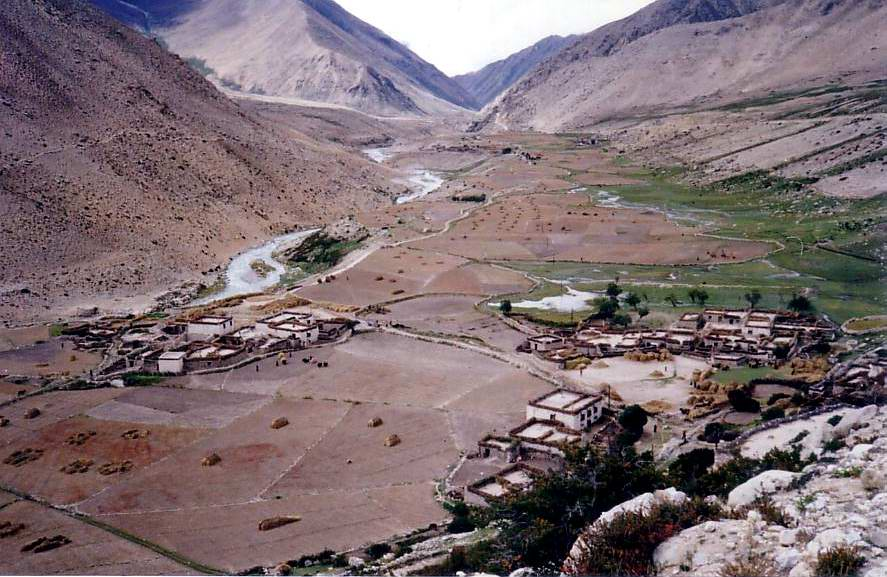
Outside Milarepa's Cave, about 10 km north of Nyalam Town

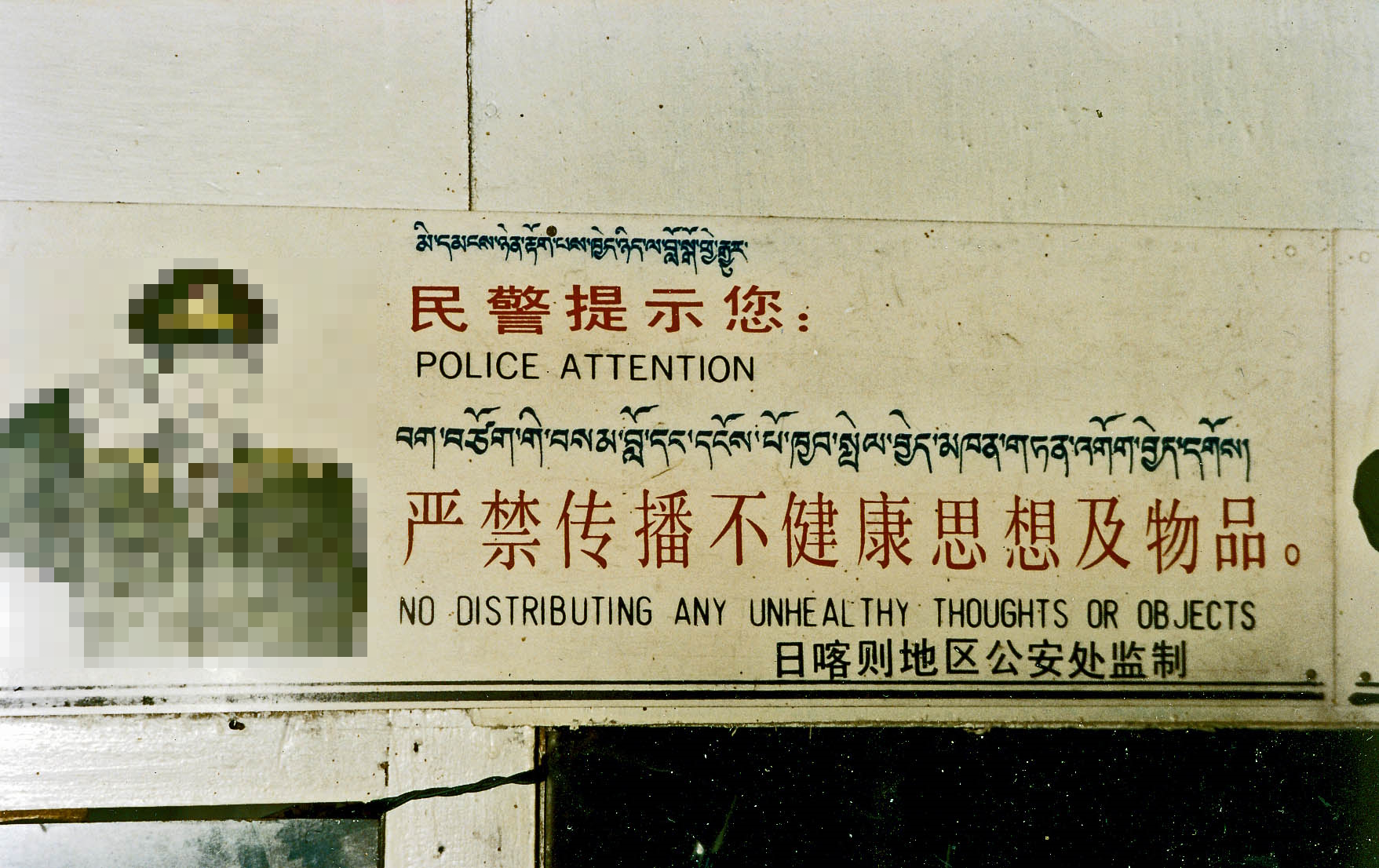
"Police Attention: No distributing any unhealthy thoughts or objects." A trilingual (Tibetan - Chinese- English) sign above the entrance to a small cafe in Nyalam Town, Tibet, 1993.
