= List of highest mountains on Earth =

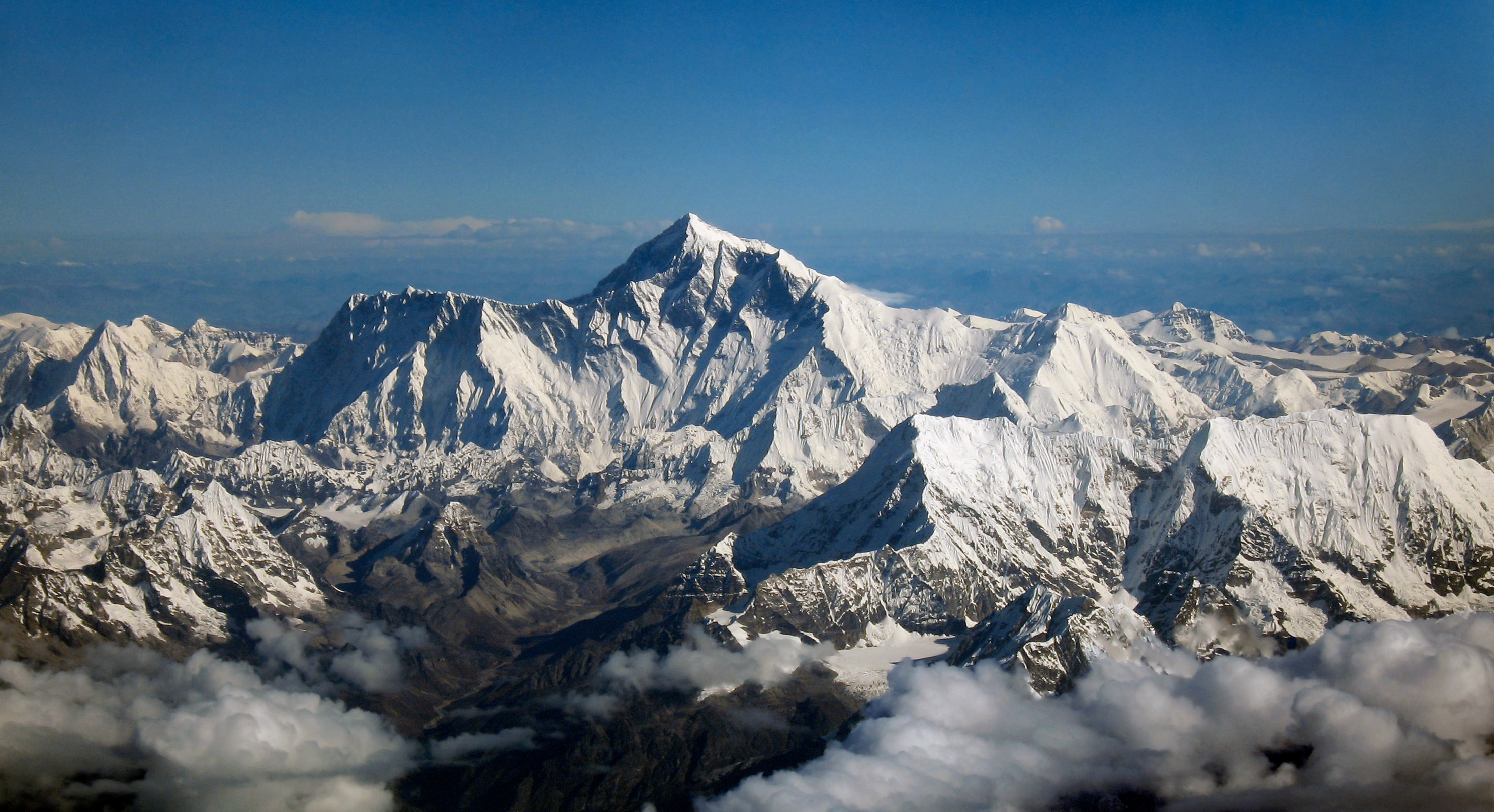
Aerial view of Mount Everest from the south. The peak rises over Lhotse, while Nuptse is the ridge on the left.

There are at least 108 mountains on Earth with elevations of 7,200 m (23,622.0 ft; 4.5 mi) or greater above sea level. Of these, 14 have an elevation of more than 8,000 m (26,246.7 ft; 5.0 mi). The vast majority of these mountains are part of either the Himalayas or the Karakoram mountain ranges located on the edge of the Indian plate and Eurasian plate in China, India, Nepal, and Pakistan. (Note: The sovereignty over the Kashmir region, containing much of the area of Karakoram and Western Himalayas, is disputed and the region is partly administered by India, Pakistan and China.)

== Discussion ==
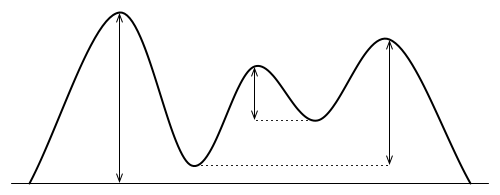
Figure demonstrating the concept of topographic prominence: The prominence of a peak is the height of the peak's summit above the lowest contour line encircling it and no higher summit. For example, vertical arrows show the topographic prominence of three peaks on an island. A dotted horizontal line links each peak (except the highest) to its key col.

The dividing line between a mountain with multiple peaks and separate mountains is not always clear (see also Highest unclimbed mountain). A popular and intuitive way to distinguish mountains from subsidiary peaks is by their height above the highest saddle connecting it to a higher summit, a measure called topographic prominence or re-ascent (the higher summit is called the "parent peak"). A common definition of a mountain is a summit with 300 m (984 ft) prominence. Alternatively, a relative prominence (prominence/height) is used (usually 7–8%) to reflect that in higher mountain ranges everything is on a larger scale. The table below lists the highest 100 summits with at least 500 m (1,640 ft) prominence, approximating a 7% relative prominence. A drawback of a prominence-based list is that it may exclude well-known or spectacular mountains that are connected via a high ridge to a taller summit, such as Eiger, Nuptse or Annapurna IV. A few such peaks and mountains with nearly sufficient prominence are included in this list, and given a rank of "S".

It is very unlikely that all given heights are correct to the nearest metre; indeed, the sea level is often problematic to define when a mountain is remote from the sea. Different sources often differ by many metres, and the heights given below may well differ from those elsewhere in this encyclopedia. As an extreme example, Ulugh Muztagh on the north Tibetan Plateau is often listed as 7,723 m (25,338 ft) to 7,754 m (25,440 ft), but appears to be only 6,973 m (22,877 ft) to 6,987 m (22,923 ft). Some mountains differ by more than 100 m (330 ft) on different maps, while even very thorough current measurements of Mount Everest range from 8,840 m (29,003 ft) to 8,849 m (29,032 ft). These discrepancies serve to emphasize the uncertainties in the listed heights.

Though some parts of the world, especially the most mountainous parts, have never been thoroughly mapped, it is unlikely that any mountains this high have been overlooked, because synthetic aperture radar can and has been used to measure elevations of most otherwise inaccessible places. Still, heights or prominences may be revised, so that the order of the list may change and even new mountains could enter the list over time. To be safe, the list has been extended to include all 7,200 m (23,622 ft) peaks.

The highest mountains above sea level are generally not the highest mountains above the surrounding terrain, also called the highest free-standing mountains. There is no precise definition of surrounding base, but Denali, Mount Kilimanjaro and Nanga Parbat are possible candidates for the tallest mountain on land by this measure.

The bases of mountain islands are below sea level, and given this consideration. Mauna Kea (4,207 m (13,802 ft) above sea level) is the world's tallest mountain and volcano, rising about 10,203 m (33,474 ft) from the Pacific Ocean floor. Mount Lamlam on Guam is periodically claimed to be among the world's highest mountains because it is adjacent to the Mariana Trench; the most extreme claim is that, measured from Challenger Deep 313 kilometres (194 mi) away, Mount Lamlam is 11,530 metres (37,820 ft) tall. Ojos del Salado has the greatest rise on Earth: 13,420 m (44,029 ft) vertically to the summit from the bottom of the Atacama Trench, which is about 560 km (350 mi) away, although most of this rise is not part of the mountain.

The highest mountains are also not generally the most voluminous. Mauna Loa (4,169 m or 13,678 ft) is the largest mountain on Earth in terms of base area (about 5,200 km^{2} or 2,000 sq mi) and volume (about 42,000 km^{3} or 10,000 mi^{3}), although, due to the intergrade of lava from Kilauea, Hualalai and Mauna Kea, the volume can only be estimated based on surface area and height of the edifice. Mount Kilimanjaro is the largest non-shield volcano in terms of both base area (635 km^{2} or 245 sq mi) and volume (4,793 km^{3} or 1,150 mi^{3}). Mount Logan is the largest non-volcanic mountain in base area (311 km^{2} or 120 sq mi).

The highest mountains above sea level are also not those with peaks farthest from the centre of the Earth, because the shape of the Earth is not spherical. Sea level closer to the equator is several kilometres farther from the centre of the Earth. The summit of Chimborazo, Ecuador's tallest mountain, is usually considered to be the farthest point from the Earth's centre, although the southern summit of Peru's tallest mountain, Huascarán, is another contender. Both have elevations above sea level more than 2 km (1.2 mi) less than that of Everest.

== Geographical distribution ==
Number of mountain peaks over 7,200 metres (23,622 ft) above sea level, including subsidiary peaks.
China	50
Pakistan	42
Nepal	34
India	27
Bhutan	5
Afghanistan	1
Kyrgyzstan	1
Tajikistan	1

Almost all mountains in the list are located in the Himalaya and Karakoram ranges to the south and west of the Tibetan Plateau. All peaks 7,000 m (22,966 ft) or higher are located in East, Central or South Asia in a rectangle edged by Noshaq (7,492 m or 24,580 ft) on the Afghanistan–Pakistan border in the west, Jengish Chokusu (Tuōmù'ěr Fēng, 7,439 m or 24,406 ft) on the Kyrgyzstan–Xinjiang border to the north, Gongga Shan (Minya Konka, 7,556 m or 24,790 ft) in Sichuan to the east, and Kabru (7,412 m or 24,318 ft) on the Sikkim–Nepal border to the south.

As of November 2025, the highest peaks on four of the mountains — Gangkhar Puensum, Labuche Kang III, Tongshanjiabu and Apsarasas Kangri, (Note: Only the lower Apsarasis I (7241 m) has been climbed, the higher Apsarasis II and Apsarasis III have not been climbed.) all located in India, Bhutan or China — have not been ascended. The most recent peak to have its first ever ascent is Karjiang, in China, on 13 August 2024.

The highest mountain outside of Asia is Aconcagua (6,962 m or 22,841 ft), the 189th highest in the world.

== List of highest peaks ==
List of Earth's highest peaks with their prominence and parent mountain
Rank (Note: Peaks which are considered sub-prominences are given a rank of "S".)	Mountain name(s)	Height (rounded) (Note: For Nepal, the heights indicated on the Nepal Topographic Maps are followed. For China and the Baltoro Karakoram, the heights are those of Mi Desheng's "The Maps of Snow Mountains in China". For the Hispar Karakoram the heights on a Russian 1:100,000 topo map. Elsewhere, unless otherwise indicated, heights are those in Neate (1989).)	Prominence (rounded) (Note: Prominences over 1,500 m (4,900 ft) are from Peaklist.org, the remainder from Jurgalski and de Ferrantin.)	Range	Coordinates (Note: Coordinates were established by comparing topographical maps with satellite images and SRTM-derived terrain maps. The terrain maps and satellite images often do not match exactly. An asterisk (*) indicates that the map and image are shifted by more than 100 m (330 ft) and/or that the landscapes around the summit do not match.)	Parent mountain (Note: The first higher mountain beyond the key saddle with at least 500 m (1,600 ft) prominence itself.)	First ascent (Note: The number of ascents and failed attempts up to 2004 is extracted from Alpine Club Himalayan Index. These are the number of expeditions (not individuals) that announced their ascent or attempt in a journal. They are probably quite accurate for the rarely climbed peaks (though omissions were noted), but greatly underestimate the number of ascending parties on the easier and/or more popular mountains, like most eight-thousanders. For instance, up to 2004 Mount Everest was scaled 2,251 times by individuals.)	Country/ Region administered by	Image
1	Mount Everest; Sagarmatha; Chomolungma	8,849 metres (29,032 ft) (Note: Given the large differences between multiple "definitive" measurements of Mount Everest, the height agreed by China and Nepal on 8 December 2020 8,848.86 m (29,031.7 ft) is used for the rounded values. For more information, see Mount Everest#Surveys.)	8,849 metres (29,032 ft)	Mahalangur Himalaya	27°59′17″N 86°55′30″E	—N/a	1953	Nepal; China	
2	K2	8,611 metres (28,251 ft)	4,020 metres (13,190 ft)	Baltoro Karakoram	35°52′53″N 76°30′48″E	Mount Everest	1954	Pakistan, China	
3	Kangchenjunga	8,586 metres (28,169 ft)	3,922 metres (12,867 ft)	Kangchenjunga Himalaya	27°42′12″N 88°08′51″E *	Mount Everest	1955	Nepal; India	
4	Lhotse	8,516 metres (27,940 ft)	610 metres (2,000 ft)	Mahalangur Himalaya	27°57′42″N 86°55′59″E	Mount Everest	1956	China; Nepal	
5	Makalu	8,485 metres (27,838 ft)	2,378 metres (7,802 ft)	Mahalangur Himalaya	27°53′23″N 87°05′20″E	Mount Everest	1955	Nepal; China	
6	Cho Oyu	8,188 metres (26,864 ft) (Note: Cho Oyu's height is 8,188 m (26,864 ft) according to the Nepal Survey's 1996 topographical map, which represents the best known measurement to date. Previous estimates have been 8,153 m (26,749 ft) and 8,201 m (26,906 ft).)	2,340 metres (7,680 ft)	Mahalangur Himalaya	28°05′39″N 86°39′39″E	Mount Everest	1954	China; Nepal	
7	Dhaulagiri I	8,167 metres (26,795 ft)	3,357 metres (11,014 ft)	Dhaulagiri Himalaya	28°41′48″N 83°29′35″E	K2	1960	Nepal	
8	Manaslu	8,163 metres (26,781 ft)	3,092 metres (10,144 ft)	Manaslu Himalaya	28°33′00″N 84°33′35″E	Cho Oyu	1956	Nepal	
9	Nanga Parbat	8,126 metres (26,660 ft)	4,608 metres (15,118 ft)	Nanga Parbat Himalaya	35°14′14″N 74°35′21″E	Dhaulagiri	1953	Pakistan (Note: In Pakistani-administered Gilgit-Baltistan)	
10	Annapurna I	8,091 metres (26,545 ft)	2,984 metres (9,790 ft)	Annapurna Himalaya	28°35′44″N 83°49′13″E	Cho Oyu	1950	Nepal	
11	Gasherbrum I; Hidden Peak; K5	8,080 metres (26,510 ft)	2,155 metres (7,070 ft)	Baltoro Karakoram	35°43′28″N 76°41′47″E	K2	1958	Pakistan; China	
12	Broad Peak	8,051 metres (26,414 ft)	1,701 metres (5,581 ft)	Baltoro Karakoram	35°48′38″N 76°34′06″E	Gasherbrum I	1957	Pakistan, China	
13	Gasherbrum II; K4	8,035 metres (26,362 ft)	1,524 metres (5,000 ft)	Baltoro Karakoram	35°45′28″N 76°39′12″E	Gasherbrum I	1956	Pakistan, China	
14	Shishapangma; Gosainthan	8,027 metres (26,335 ft)	2,897 metres (9,505 ft)	Jugal Himalaya	28°21′12″N 85°46′43″E	Cho Oyu	1964	China	
15	Gyachung Kang	7,952 metres (26,089 ft)	672 metres (2,205 ft)	Mahalangur Himalaya	28°05′53″N 86°44′42″E	Cho Oyu	1964	Nepal; China	
S	Gasherbrum III; K3a	7,946 metres (26,070 ft)	355 metres (1,165 ft)	Baltoro Karakoram	35°45′33″N 76°38′30″E	Gasherbrum II	1975	Pakistan, China	
16	Annapurna II	7,937 metres (26,040 ft)	2,437 metres (7,995 ft)	Annapurna Himalaya	28°32′05″N 84°07′19″E	Annapurna I	1960	Nepal	
17	Gasherbrum IV; K3	7,932 metres (26,024 ft)	712 metres (2,336 ft)	Baltoro Karakoram	35°45′38″N 76°36′58″E	Gasherbrum III	1958	Pakistan	
18	Himalchuli	7,893 metres (25,896 ft)	1,633 metres (5,358 ft)	Manaslu Himalaya	28°26′12″N 84°38′23″E *	Manaslu	1960	Nepal	
19	Distaghil Sar	7,884 metres (25,866 ft)	2,525 metres (8,284 ft)	Hispar Karakoram	36°19′33″N 75°11′16″E	K2	1960	Pakistan	
20	Ngadi Chuli	7,871 metres (25,823 ft)	1,011 metres (3,317 ft)	Manaslu Himalaya	28°30′12″N 84°34′00″E	Manaslu	1979	Nepal	
S	Nuptse	7,864 metres (25,801 ft)	305 metres (1,001 ft)	Mahalangur Himalaya	27°58′03″N 86°53′13″E	Lhotse	1961	Nepal	
21	Khunyang Chhish	7,823 metres (25,666 ft)	1,765 metres (5,791 ft)	Hispar Karakoram	36°12′19″N 75°12′28″E *	Distaghil Sar	1971	Pakistan	
22	Masherbrum; K1	7,821 metres (25,659 ft)	2,457 metres (8,061 ft)	Masherbrum Karakoram	35°38′28″N 76°18′21″E	Gasherbrum I	1960	Pakistan	
23	Nanda Devi	7,817 metres (25,646 ft)	3,139 metres (10,299 ft)	Garhwal Himalaya	30°22′33″N 79°58′15″E	Dhaulagiri	1936	India	
24	Chomo Lonzo	7,804 metres (25,604 ft)	590 metres (1,940 ft)	Mahalangur Himalaya	27°55′50″N 87°06′28″E	Makalu	1954	China	
25	Batura Sar	7,795 metres (25,574 ft)	3,118 metres (10,230 ft)	Batura Karakoram	36°30′37″N 74°31′21″E	Distaghil Sar	1976	Pakistan	
26	Rakaposhi	7,788 metres (25,551 ft)	2,818 metres (9,245 ft)	Rakaposhi-Haramosh Karakoram	36°08′33″N 74°29′22″E	Khunyang Chhish	1958	Pakistan	
27	Namcha Barwa	7,782 metres (25,531 ft)	4,106 metres (13,471 ft)	Assam Himalaya	29°37′52″N 95°03′19″E	Kangchenjunga	1992	China	
28	Kanjut Sar	7,760 metres (25,460 ft)	1,660 metres (5,450 ft)	Hispar Karakoram	36°12′20″N 75°25′01″E	Khunyang Chhish	1959	Pakistan	
29	Kamet	7,756 metres (25,446 ft)	2,825 metres (9,268 ft)	Garhwal Himalaya	30°55′12″N 79°35′30″E *	Nanda Devi	1931	India	
30	Dhaulagiri II	7,751 metres (25,430 ft)	2,397 metres (7,864 ft)	Dhaulagiri Himalaya	28°45′46″N 83°23′18″E	Dhaulagiri	1971	Nepal	
31	Saltoro Kangri; K10	7,742 metres (25,400 ft)	2,160 metres (7,090 ft)	Saltoro Karakoram	35°23′57″N 76°50′53″E *	Gasherbrum I	1962	Pakistan, India	
32	Kumbhakarna; Jannu	7,711 metres (25,299 ft)	1,036 metres (3,399 ft)	Kangchenjunga Himalaya	27°40′56″N 88°02′40″E *	Kangchenjunga	1962	Nepal	
33	Tirich Mir	7,708 metres (25,289 ft)	3,910 metres (12,830 ft)	Hindu Kush	36°15′19″N 71°50′30″E *	Batura Sar	1950	Pakistan	
S	Molamenqing	7,703 metres (25,272 ft)	433 metres (1,421 ft)	Langtang Himalaya	28°21′18″N 85°48′35″E	Shishapangma	1981	China	
34	Gurla Mandhata	7,694 metres (25,243 ft)	2,788 metres (9,147 ft)	Nalakankar Himalaya	30°26′19″N 81°17′48″E	Dhaulagiri	1985	China	
35	Saser Kangri I; K22	7,672 metres (25,171 ft)	2,304 metres (7,559 ft)	Saser Karakoram	34°52′00″N 77°45′09″E	Gasherbrum I	1973	India	
36	Chogolisa	7,665 metres (25,148 ft)	1,624 metres (5,328 ft)	Masherbrum Karakoram	35°36′47″N 76°34′29″E	Gasherbrum I	1975	Pakistan	
S	Dhaulagiri IV	7,661 metres (25,135 ft)	469 metres (1,539 ft)	Dhaulagiri Himalaya	28°44′09″N 83°18′55″E	Dhaulagiri II	1975	Nepal	
37	Kongur Tagh	7,649 metres (25,095 ft)	3,585 metres (11,762 ft)	Kongur Shan (Eastern Pamirs)	38°35′36″N 75°18′48″E	Distaghil Sar	1981	China	
S	Dhaulagiri V	7,618 metres (24,993 ft)	340 metres (1,120 ft)	Dhaulagiri Himalaya	28°44′02″N 83°21′41″E *	Dhaulagiri IV	1975	Nepal	
38	Shispare	7,611 metres (24,970 ft)	1,240 metres (4,070 ft)	Batura Karakoram	36°26′26″N 74°40′51″E	Batura Sar	1974	Pakistan	
39	Trivor	7,577 metres (24,859 ft)	997 metres (3,271 ft)	Hispar Karakoram	36°17′15″N 75°05′06″E *	Distaghil Sar	1960	Pakistan	
40	Gangkhar Puensum	7,570 metres (24,840 ft)	2,995 metres (9,826 ft)	Kula Kangri Himalaya	28°02′50″N 90°27′19″E *	Kangchenjunga	none	Bhutan; China	
41	Gongga Shan; Minya Konka	7,556 metres (24,790 ft)	3,642 metres (11,949 ft)	Daxue Mountains (Hengduan Shan)	29°35′43″N 101°52′47″E	Mount Everest	1932	China	
42	Annapurna III	7,555 metres (24,787 ft)	703 metres (2,306 ft)	Annapurna Himalaya	28°35′06″N 83°59′24″E	Annapurna I	1961	Nepal	
43	Skyang Kangri	7,545 metres (24,754 ft)	1,085 metres (3,560 ft)	Baltoro Karakoram	35°55′35″N 76°34′03″E	K2	1976	Pakistan, China	
44	Changtse	7,543 metres (24,747 ft)	514 metres (1,686 ft)	Mahalangur Himalaya	28°01′29″N 86°54′51″E	Mount Everest	1982	China	
45	Kula Kangri	7,538 metres (24,731 ft)	1,654 metres (5,427 ft)	Kula Kangri Himalaya	28°13′37″N 90°36′59″E	Gangkhar Puensum	1986	China; Bhutan; (Note: Wholly claimed by China as a part of its Tibet Autonomous Region; on the border with Bhutan according to Bhutan)	
46	Kongur Tiube	7,530 metres (24,700 ft)	840 metres (2,760 ft)	Kongur Shan (Eastern Pamirs)	38°36′57″N 75°11′45″E	Kongur Tagh	1956	China	
S	Annapurna IV	7,525 metres (24,688 ft)	255 metres (837 ft)	Annapurna Himalaya	28°32′15″N 84°4′58″E	Annapurna	1955	Nepal	
47	Mamostong Kangri	7,516 metres (24,659 ft)	1,803 metres (5,915 ft)	Rimo Karakoram	35°08′31″N 77°34′39″E	Gasherbrum I	1984	India	
48	Saser Kangri II E	7,513 metres (24,649 ft)	1,458 metres (4,783 ft)	Saser Karakoram	34°48′17″N 77°48′24″E	Saser Kangri I	2011 (Note: The lower West peak, 2.5 km (1.6 mi) away, was climbed in 1984 and twice since.)	India	
49	Muztagh Ata	7,546 metres (24,757 ft)	2,698 metres (8,852 ft)	Muztagata (Eastern Pamirs)	38°16′33″N 75°06′58″E	Kongur Tagh	1956	China	
50	Ismoil Somoni Peak	7,495 metres (24,590 ft)	3,402 metres (11,161 ft)	Pamir (Academy of Sciences Range)	38°56′35″N 72°00′57″E	Muztagh Ata	1933	Tajikistan	
51	Saser Kangri III	7,495 metres (24,590 ft)	835 metres (2,740 ft)	Saser Karakoram	34°50′44″N 77°47′06″E	Saser Kangri I	1986	India (Note: In Indian-administered Ladakh of the disputed Kashmir region)	
52	Noshaq	7,492 metres (24,580 ft)	2,024 metres (6,640 ft)	Hindu Kush	36°25′56″N 71°49′43″E	Tirich Mir	1960	Afghanistan; Pakistan	
53	Pumari Chhish	7,492 metres (24,580 ft)	884 metres (2,900 ft)	Hispar Karakoram	36°12′41″N 75°15′01″E	Khunyang Chhish	1979	Pakistan	
54	Passu Sar	7,476 metres (24,528 ft)	647 metres (2,123 ft)	Batura Karakoram	36°29′16″N 74°35′16″E	Batura Sar	1994	Pakistan	
55	Yukshin Gardan Sar	7,469 metres (24,505 ft)	1,374 metres (4,508 ft)	Hispar Karakoram	36°15′04″N 75°22′29″E	Pumari Chhish	1984	Pakistan	
56	Teram Kangri I	7,462 metres (24,482 ft)	1,703 metres (5,587 ft)	Siachen Karakoram	35°34′48″N 77°04′42″E	Gasherbrum I	1975	China; India; (Note: In Chinese-administered Trans-Karakoram Tract in the disputed Kashmir region) (Note: On the border of Indian-controlled Siachen Glacier in the disputed Kashmir region)	
57	Jongsong Peak	7,462 metres (24,482 ft)	1,298 metres (4,259 ft)	Kangchenjunga Himalaya	27°52′54″N 88°08′09″E	Kangchenjunga	1930	India; China; Nepal	
58	Malubiting	7,458 metres (24,469 ft)	2,193 metres (7,195 ft)	Rakaposhi-Haramosh Karakoram	36°00′12″N 74°52′31″E	Rakaposhi	1971	Pakistan	
59	Gangapurna	7,455 metres (24,459 ft)	563 metres (1,847 ft)	Annapurna Himalaya	28°36′18″N 83°57′49″E	Annapurna III	1965	Nepal	
60	Jengish Chokusu; Tömür; Pik Pobedy	7,439 metres (24,406 ft)	4,148 metres (13,609 ft)	Tian Shan	42°02′05″N 80°07′47″E	Ismail Samani Peak	1956	Kyrgyzstan; China	
S	Sunanda Devi; Nanda Devi East	7,434 metres (24,390 ft)	229 metres (751 ft)	Garhwal Himalaya	30°22′00″N 79°59′40″E	Nanda Devi	1939	India	
61	K12	7,428 metres (24,370 ft)	1,978 metres (6,490 ft)	Saltoro Karakoram	35°17′45″N 77°01′20″E	Saltoro Kangri	1974	Pakistan, India	
62	Yangra; Ganesh I	7,422 metres (24,350 ft)	2,352 metres (7,717 ft)	Ganesh Himalaya	28°23′29″N 85°07′38″E	Shishapangma	1955	China; Nepal	
63	Sia Kangri	7,422 metres (24,350 ft)	642 metres (2,106 ft)	Siachen Karakoram	35°39′48″N 76°45′42″E	Gasherbrum I	1934	Pakistan; China	
64	Momhil Sar	7,414 metres (24,324 ft)	907 metres (2,976 ft)	Hispar Karakoram	36°19′04″N 75°02′11″E *	Trivor	1964	Pakistan	
65	Kabru North	7,412 metres (24,318 ft)	720 metres (2,360 ft)	Kangchenjunga Himalaya	27°38′02″N 88°07′00″E	Kangchenjunga	1994	India; Nepal	
66	Skil Brum	7,410 metres (24,310 ft)	1,152 metres (3,780 ft)	Baltoro Karakoram	35°51′03″N 76°25′43″E	K2	1957	Pakistan	
67	Haramosh Peak	7,409 metres (24,308 ft)	2,277 metres (7,470 ft)	Rakaposhi-Haramosh Karakoram	35°50′24″N 74°53′51″E	Malubiting	1958	Pakistan	
68	Istor-o-Nal	7,403 metres (24,288 ft)	1,043 metres (3,422 ft)	Hindu Kush	36°22′32″N 71°53′54″E	Noshaq	1969	Pakistan	
69	Ghent Kangri	7,401 metres (24,281 ft)	1,493 metres (4,898 ft)	Saltoro Karakoram	35°31′04″N 76°48′02″E	Saltoro Kangri	1961	Pakistan, India	
70	Ultar	7,388 metres (24,239 ft)	688 metres (2,257 ft)	Batura Karakoram	36°23′27″N 74°43′00″E	Shispare	1996	Pakistan	
71	Rimo I	7,385 metres (24,229 ft)	1,428 metres (4,685 ft)	Rimo Karakoram	35°21′18″N 77°22′08″E	Teram Kangri I	1988	India	
72	Churen Himal	7,385 metres (24,229 ft)	650 metres (2,130 ft)	Dhaulagiri Himalaya	28°44′05″N 83°13′03″E	Dhaulagiri IV	1970	Nepal	
73	Teram Kangri III	7,382 metres (24,219 ft)	520 metres (1,710 ft)	Siachen Karakoram	35°35′59″N 77°02′53″E	Teram Kangri I	1979	India; China	
74	Sherpi Kangri	7,380 metres (24,210 ft)	1,320 metres (4,330 ft)	Saltoro Karakoram	35°27′58″N 76°46′53″E *	Ghent Kangri	1976	Pakistan	
75	Labuche Kang	7,367 metres (24,170 ft)	1,957 metres (6,421 ft)	Labuche Himalaya	28°18′15″N 86°21′03″E	Cho Oyu	1987	China	
76	Kirat Chuli	7,362 metres (24,154 ft)	1,168 metres (3,832 ft)	Kangchenjunga Himalaya	27°47′16″N 88°11′43″E	Kangchenjunga	1939	Nepal; India	
S	Abi Gamin	7,355 metres (24,131 ft)	217 metres (712 ft)	Garhwal Himalaya	30°55′57″N 79°36′09″E	Kamet	1950	India; China	
S	Gimmigela Chuli; The Twins	7,350 metres (24,110 ft)	432 metres (1,417 ft)	Kangchenjunga Himalaya	27°44′27″N 88°09′31″E	Kangchenjunga	1994	India; Nepal	
S	Nangpai Gosum	7,350 metres (24,110 ft)	427 metres (1,401 ft)	Mahalangur Himalaya	28°04′24″N 86°36′51″E	Cho Oyu	1986	Nepal; China	
77	Saraghrar	7,349 metres (24,111 ft)	1,979 metres (6,493 ft)	Hindu Kush	36°32′51″N 72°06′54″E	Noshaq	1959	Pakistan	
S	Talung	7,349 metres (24,111 ft)	366 metres (1,201 ft)	Kangchenjunga Himalaya	27°39′18″N 88°07′51″E *	Kabru	1964	Nepal; India	
78	Jomolhari; Chomo Lhari	7,326 metres (24,035 ft)	2,341 metres (7,680 ft)	Jomolhari Himalaya	27°49′36″N 89°16′04″E *	Gangkhar Puensum	1937	Bhutan; China	
79	Chamlang	7,321 metres (24,019 ft)	1,241 metres (4,072 ft)	Mahalangur Himalaya	27°46′30″N 86°58′47″E	Lhotse	1961	Nepal	
80	Chongtar	7,315 metres (23,999 ft)	1,295 metres (4,249 ft)	Baltoro Karakoram	35°54′55″N 76°25′45″E	Skil Brum	1994	China	
81	Baltoro Kangri	7,312 metres (23,990 ft)	1,140 metres (3,740 ft)	Masherbrum Karakoram	35°38′21″N 76°40′24″E	Chogolisa	1963	Pakistan	
82	Siguang Ri	7,309 metres (23,980 ft)	669 metres (2,195 ft)	Mahalangur Himalaya	28°08′50″N 86°41′06″E	Cho Oyu	1989	China	
83	The Crown; Huang Guan Shan	7,295 metres (23,934 ft)	1,919 metres (6,296 ft)	Yengisogat Karakoram	36°06′24″N 76°12′21″E	Skil Brum (K2)	1993	China	
84	Gyala Peri	7,294 metres (23,930 ft)	2,942 metres (9,652 ft)	Assam Himalaya	29°48′52″N 94°58′07″E	Mount Everest	1986	China	
85	Porong Ri	7,292 metres (23,924 ft)	512 metres (1,680 ft)	Langtang Himalaya	28°23′22″N 85°43′12″E	Shishapangma	1982	China	
86	Baintha Brakk; The Ogre	7,285 metres (23,901 ft)	1,891 metres (6,204 ft)	Panmah Karakoram	35°56′51″N 75°45′12″E *	Kanjut Sar	1977	Pakistan	
87	Yutmaru Sar	7,283 metres (23,894 ft)	680 metres (2,230 ft)	Hispar Karakoram	36°13′35″N 75°22′02″E	Yukshin Gardan Sar	1980	Pakistan	
88	K6; Baltistan Peak	7,282 metres (23,891 ft)	1,962 metres (6,437 ft)	Masherbrum Karakoram	35°25′06″N 76°33′06″E	Chogolisa	1970	Pakistan	
89	Kangpenqing; Gang Benchhen	7,281 metres (23,888 ft)	1,345 metres (4,413 ft)	Himalaya	28°33′03″N 85°32′44″E	Shishapangma	1982	China	
90	Muztagh Tower	7,276 metres (23,871 ft)	1,710 metres (5,610 ft)	Baltoro Karakoram	35°49′40″N 76°21′40″E	Skil Brum	1956	Pakistan, China	
91	Mana Peak	7,272 metres (23,858 ft)	732 metres (2,402 ft)	Garhwal Himalaya	30°52′50″N 79°36′55″E	Kamet	1937	India	
S	Dhaulagiri VI	7,268 metres (23,845 ft)	488 metres (1,601 ft)	Dhaulagiri Himalaya	28°42′31″N 83°16′27″E	Dhaulagiri IV	1970	Nepal	
92	Diran	7,266 metres (23,839 ft)	1,329 metres (4,360 ft)	Rakaposhi-Haramosh Karakoram	36°07′13″N 74°39′42″E	Malubiting	1968	Pakistan	
93	Labuche Kang III; Labuche Kang East	7,250 metres (23,790 ft) (Note: The height is unknown, but over 7,200 m (23,600 ft) on both Chinese and Russian maps of the area.)	570 metres (1,870 ft)	Labuche Himalaya	28°18′05″N 86°23′02″E	Labuche Himalaya	none	China	
94	Putha Hiunchuli	7,246 metres (23,773 ft)	1,151 metres (3,776 ft)	Dhaulagiri Himalaya	28°44′52″N 83°08′46″E	Churen Himal	1954	Nepal	
95	Apsarasas Kangri	7,245 metres (23,770 ft)	607 metres (1,991 ft)	Siachen Karakoram	35°32′19″N 77°08′55″E	Teram Kangri I	none	India; China	
96	Mukut Parbat	7,242 metres (23,760 ft)	683 metres (2,241 ft)	Garhwal Himalaya	30°56′57″N 79°34′12″E	Kamet	1951	India; China	
97	Rimo III	7,233 metres (23,730 ft)	613 metres (2,011 ft)	Rimo Karakoram	35°22′31″N 77°21′42″E	Rimo I	1985	India (Note: In the Siachen Glacier region controlled by India.)	
98	Langtang Lirung	7,227 metres (23,711 ft)	1,534 metres (5,033 ft)	Langtang Himalaya	28°15′22″N 85°31′01″E	Shishapangma	1978	Nepal	
99	Karjiang	7,221 metres (23,691 ft)	895 metres (2,936 ft)	Kula Kangri Himalaya	28°15′27″N 90°38′49″E	Kula Kangri	2024	China	
100	Annapurna Dakshin (Annapurna South)	7,219 metres (23,684 ft)	769 metres (2,523 ft)	Annapurna Himalaya	28°31′06″N 83°48′22″E	Annapurna	1964	Nepal	
101	Khartaphu	7,213 metres (23,665 ft)	712 metres (2,336 ft)	Mahalangur Himalaya	28°03′49″N 86°58′39″E	Mount Everest	1935	China	
102	Tongshanjiabu	7,207 metres (23,645 ft)	1,757 metres (5,764 ft)	Lunana Himalaya	28°11′12″N 89°57′27″E	Gangkhar Puensum	none	Bhutan; China; (Note: Wholly claimed by Bhutan, but on the border of the Tibet Autonomous Region according to China)	
103	Malangutti Sar	7,207 metres (23,645 ft)	507 metres (1,663 ft)	Hispar Karakoram	36°21′47″N 75°08′57″E	Distaghil Sar	1985	Pakistan	
104	Noijin Kangsang; Norin Kang	7,206 metres (23,642 ft)	2,160 metres (7,090 ft)	Nagarze Himalaya	28°56′48″N 90°10′42″E	Gangkhar Puensum	1986	China	
105	Langtang Ri	7,205 metres (23,638 ft)	665 metres (2,182 ft)	Langtang Himalaya	28°22′53″N 85°41′01″E	Shishapangma	1981	Nepal; China	
106	Kangphu Kang; Shimokangri	7,204 metres (23,635 ft)	1,244 metres (4,081 ft)	Lunana Himalaya	28°09′24″N 90°04′15″E	Tongshanjiabu	2002	Bhutan; China	
107	Singhi Kangri	7,202 metres (23,629 ft)	730 metres (2,400 ft)	Siachen Karakoram	35°35′59″N 76°59′01″E	Teram Kangri III	1976	India; China	
108	Lupghar Sar	7,200 metres (23,600 ft)	730 metres (2,400 ft)	Hispar Karakoram	36°21′01″N 75°02′13″E *	Momhil Sar	1979	Pakistan	

== Gallery ==
The fourteen eight-thousanders
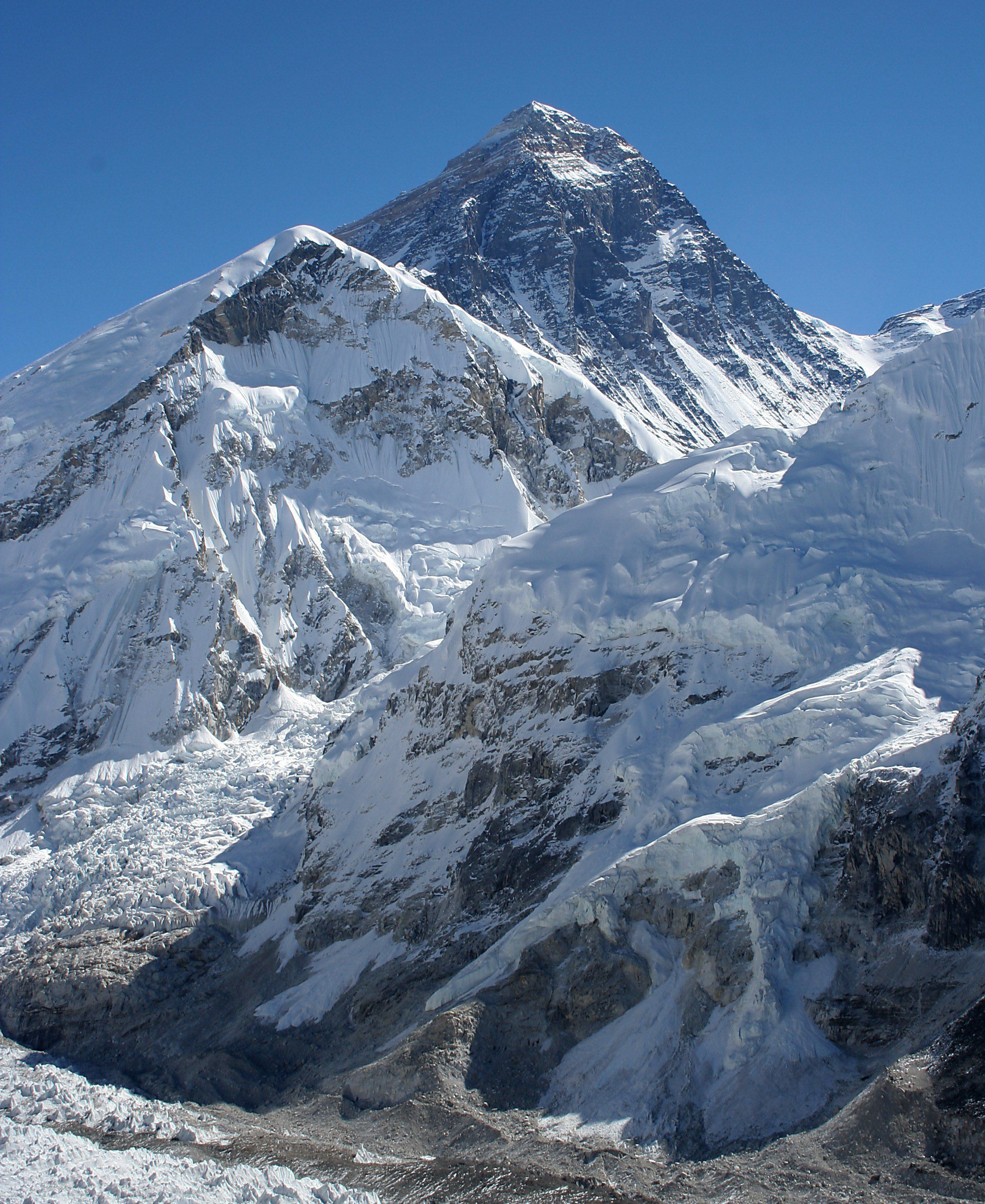
The summit of Mount Everest, the highest point above sea level on Earth

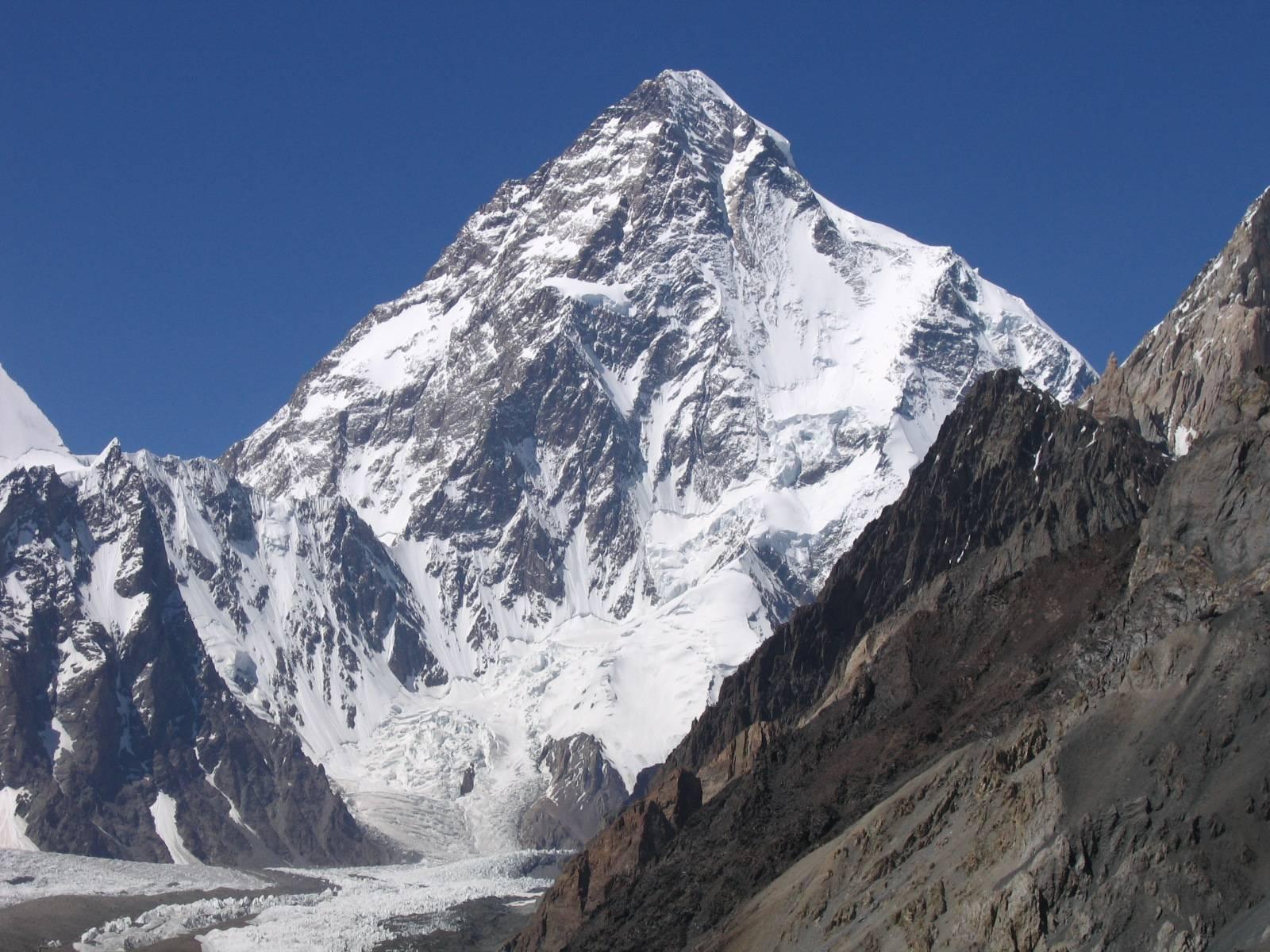
K2, the highest summit of the Karakoram

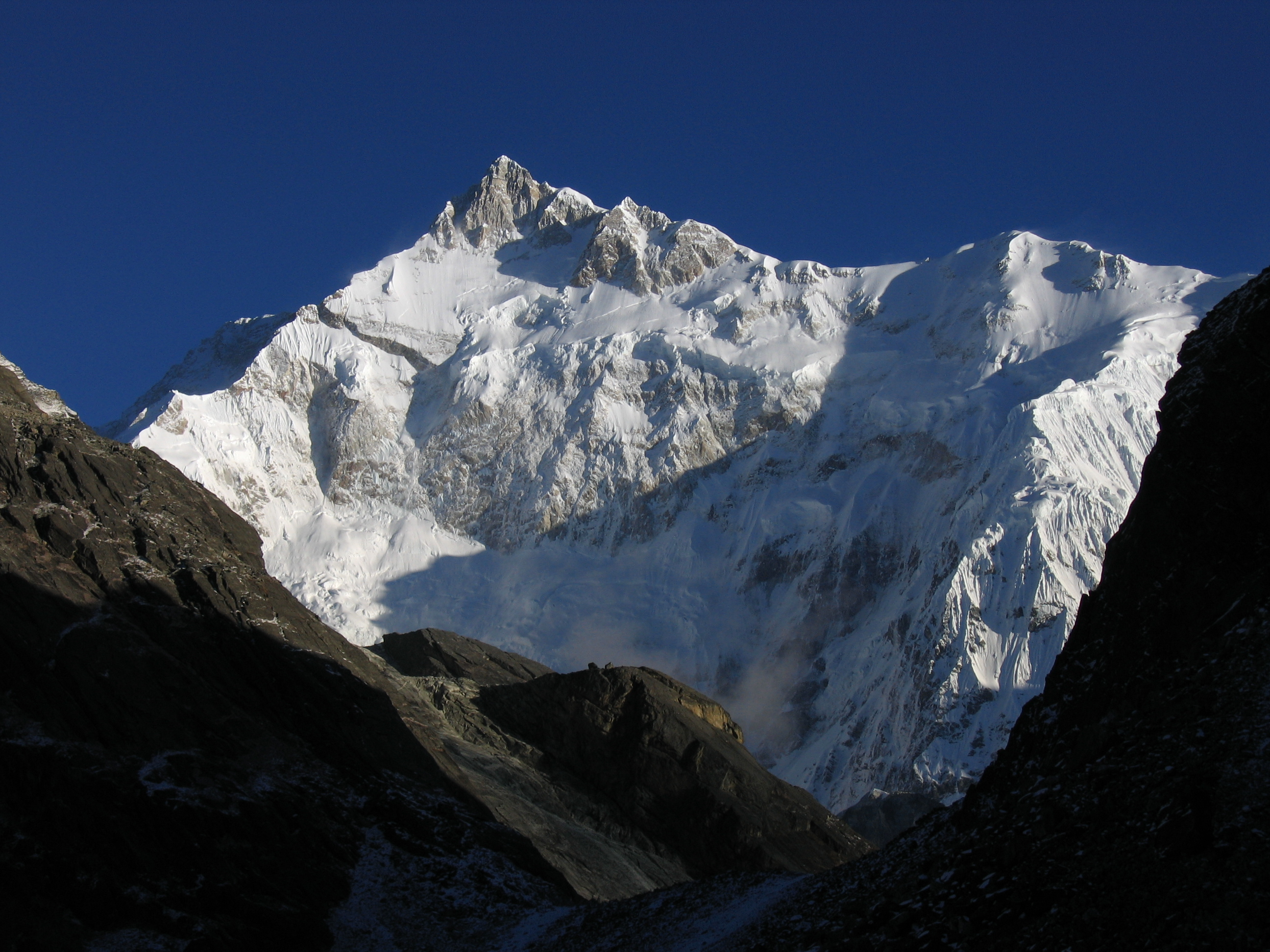
Kangchenjunga, the second-highest mountain of the Himalaya

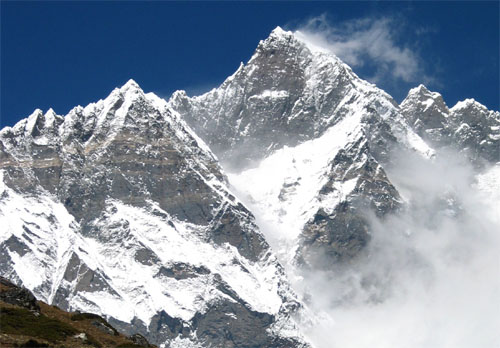
Lhotse, the third-highest mountain of the Himalaya

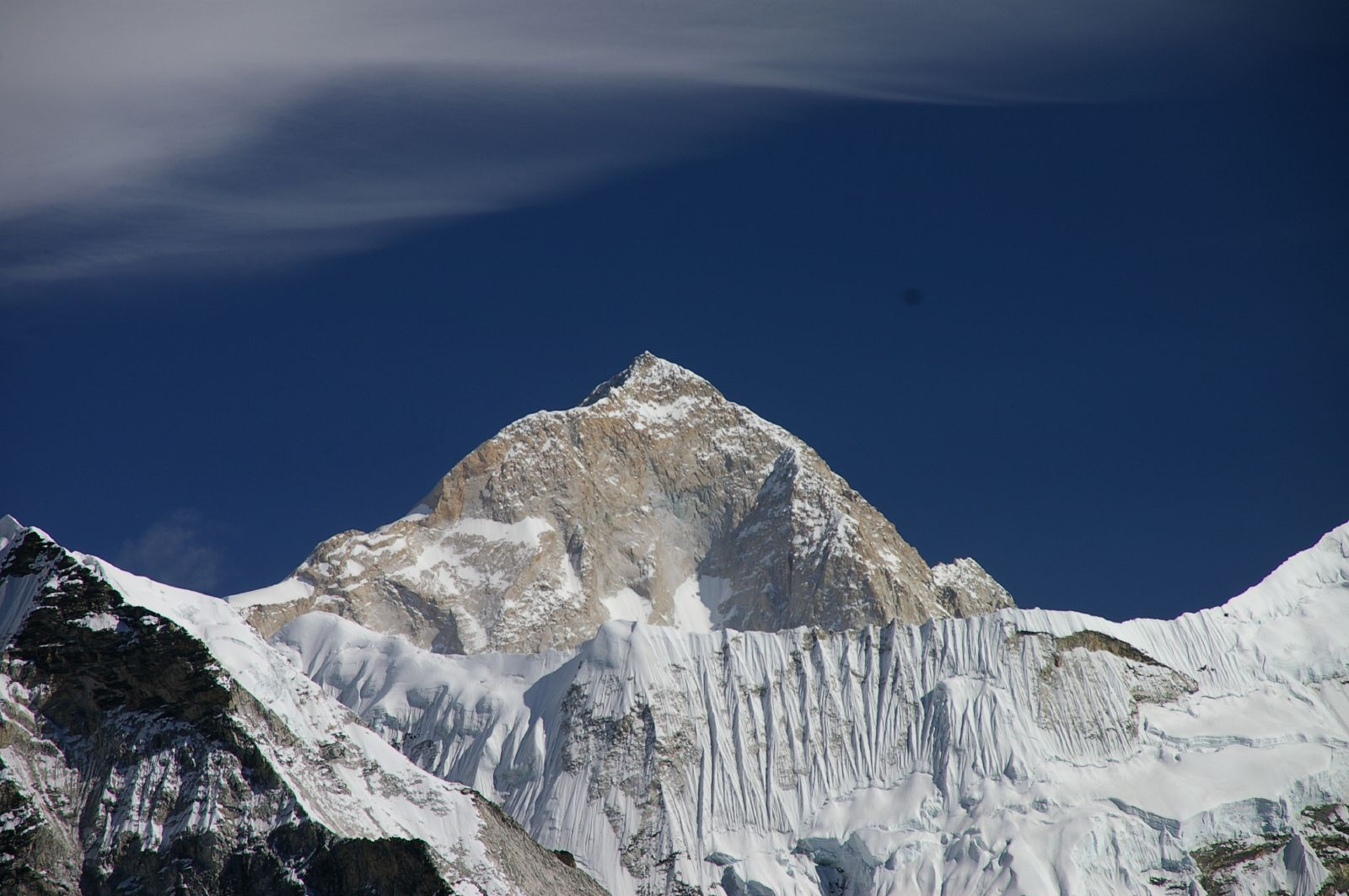
Makalu in the Himalaya

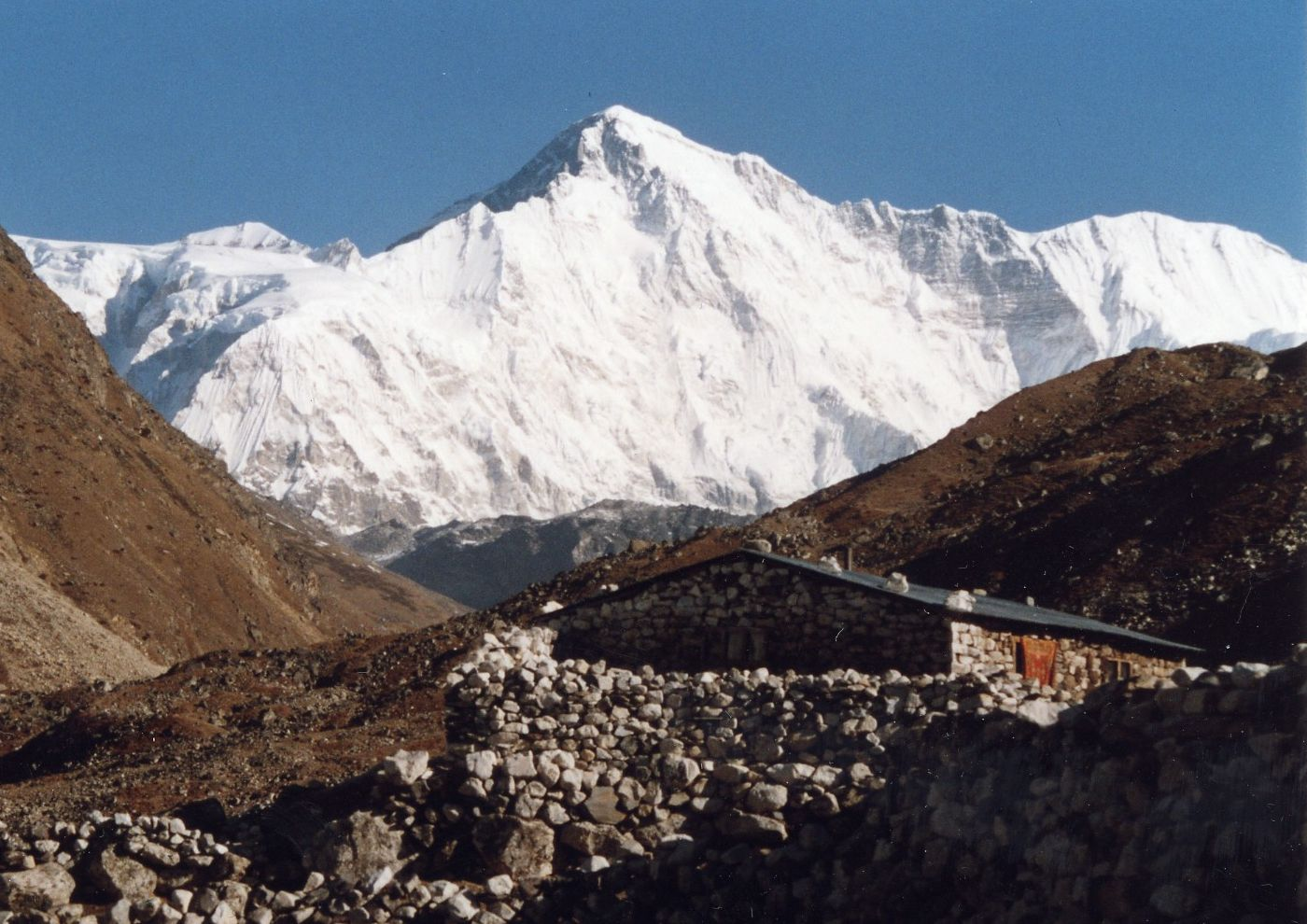
Cho Oyu in the Himalaya

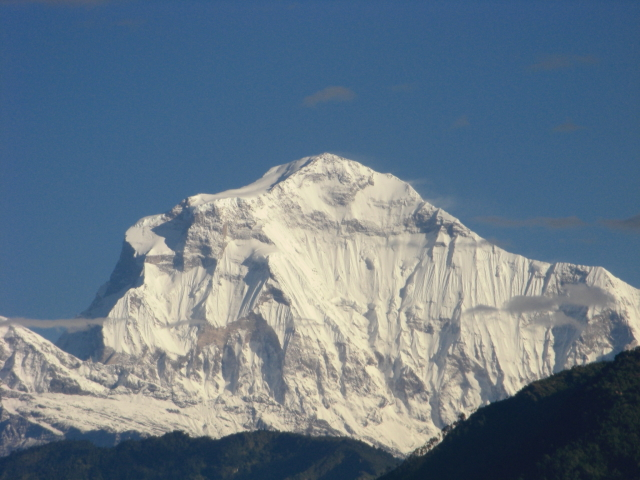
Dhaulagiri in the Himalaya

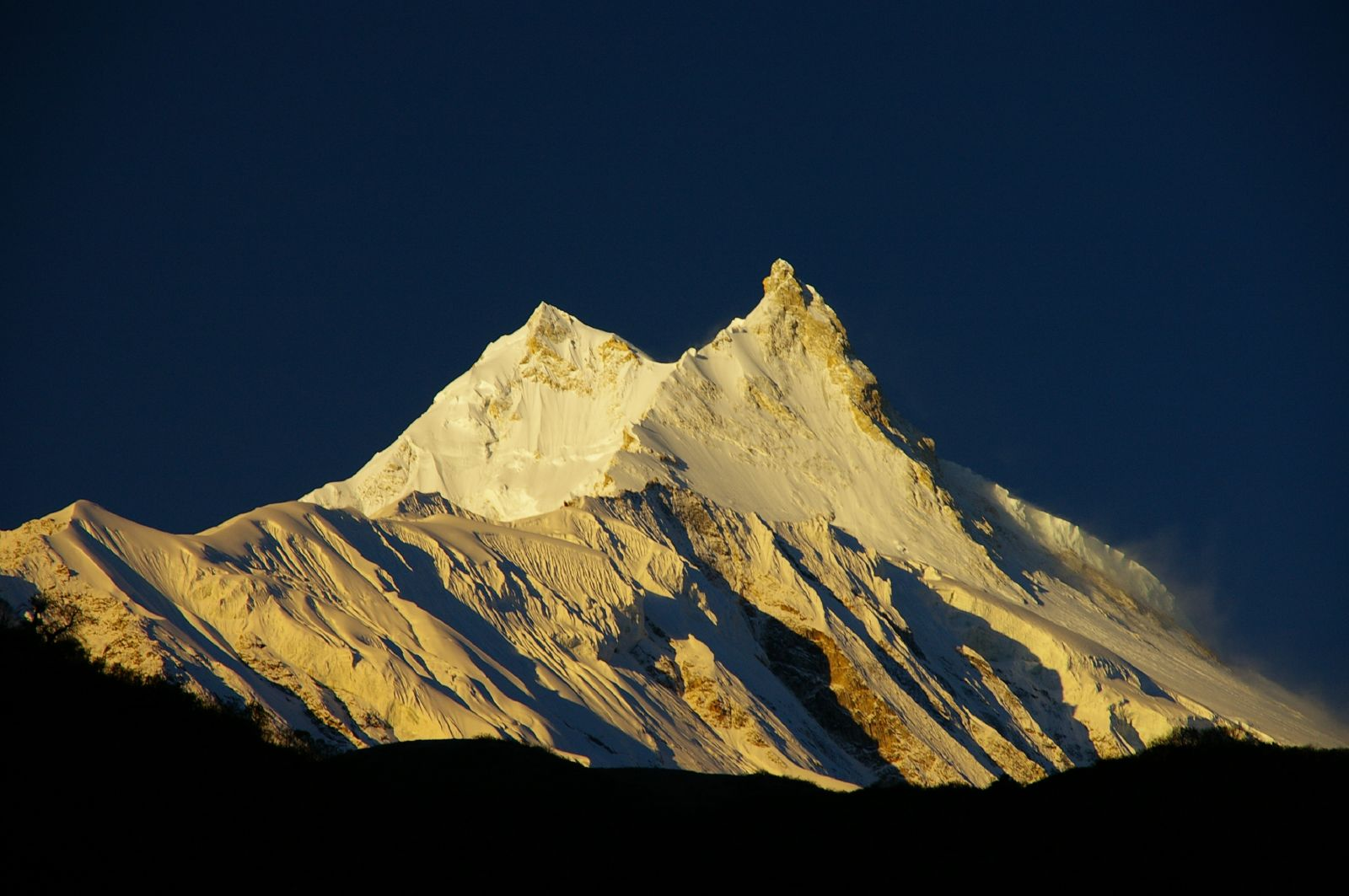
Manaslu in the Himalaya

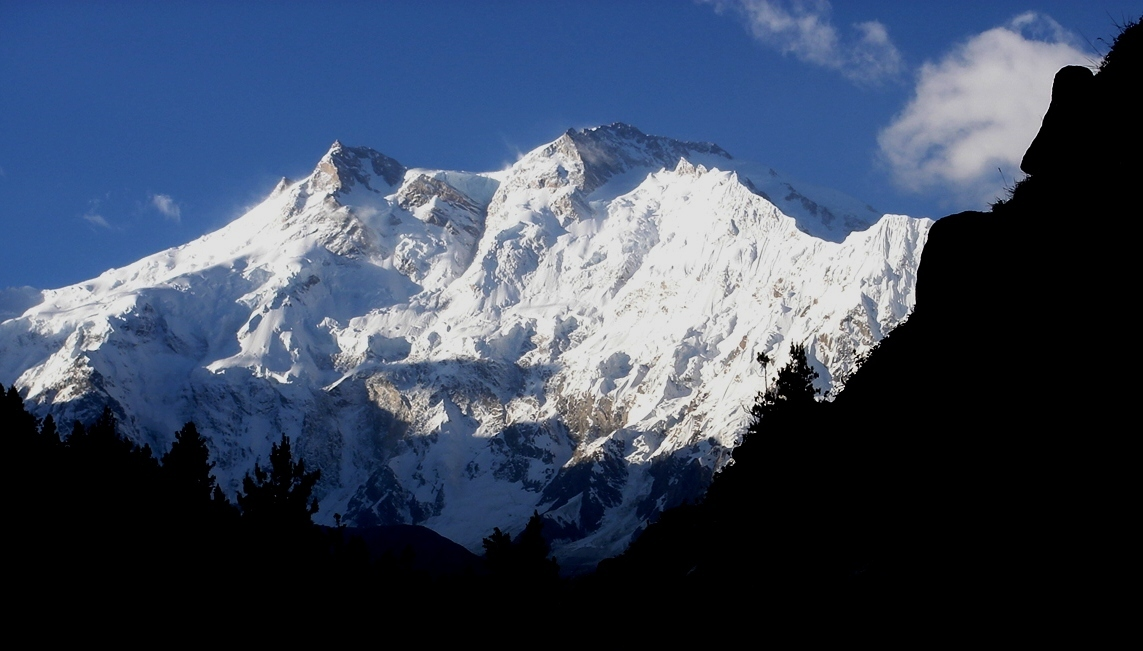
Nanga Parbat in the Himalaya

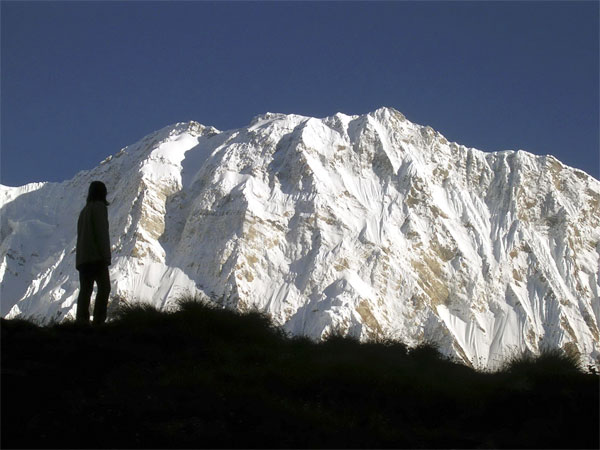
Annapurna I in the Himalaya

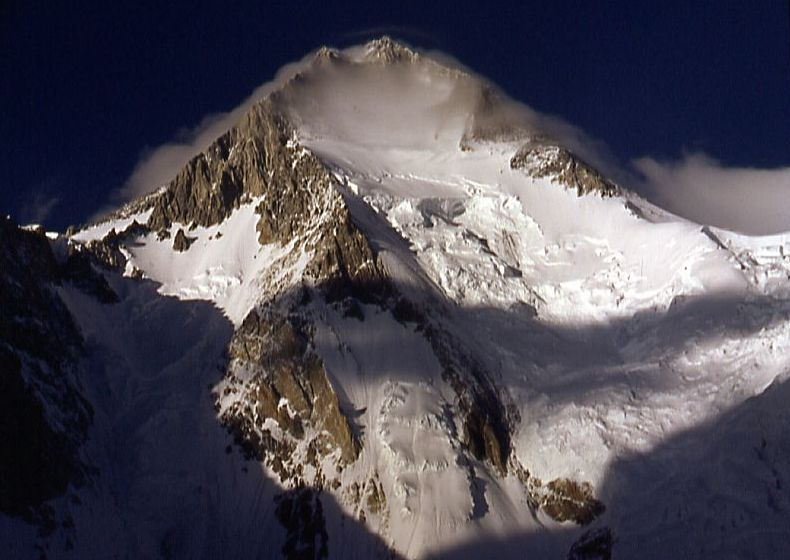
Gasherbrum I, the second-highest mountain of the Karakoram

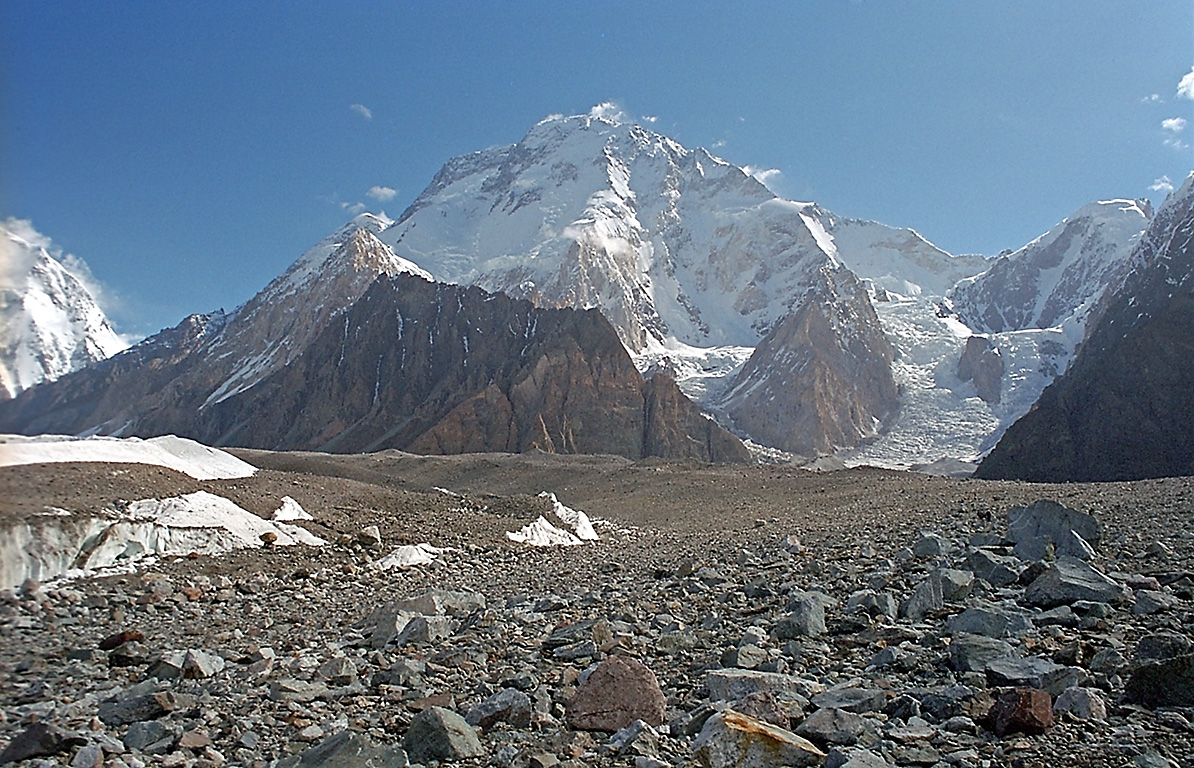
Broad Peak, the third-highest mountain of the Karakoram

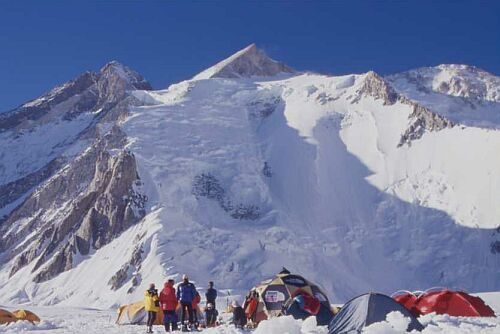
Gasherbrum II in the Karakoram

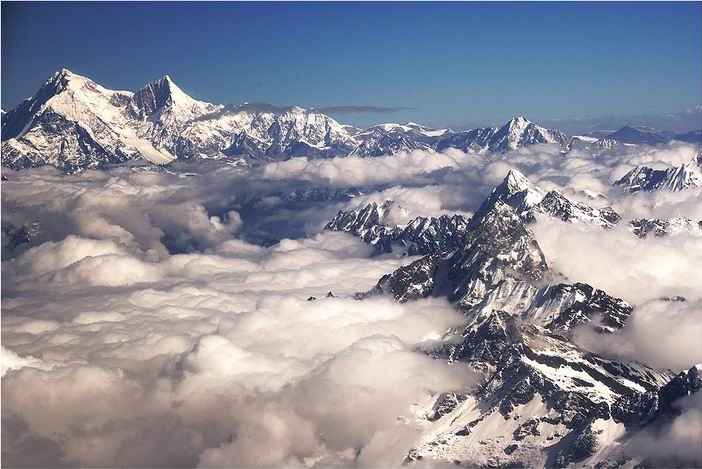
Shishapangma in the Himalaya

== See also ==
- List of mountain ranges of the world
- Summits farthest from the Earth's center
- List of tallest mountains in the Solar System
  - Olympus Mons, the tallest mountain on any planet in the Solar System
  - Rheasilvia crater's central peak, the tallest mountain in the Solar System
- Highest unclimbed mountain
- List of elevation extremes by country

== Sources ==
- Desheng, Mi (1990s). The Maps of Snow Mountains in China. Chinese Academy of Sciences.
- Finnish Meteorological Inst. (1990s). Nepal Topographic Maps. Nepalese Survey Dept.
- "High Mountain Info". High Mountain Sports Magazine (now Climb Magazine). (1990–2005).
- Neate, Jill (1989). High Asia: An Illustrated History of the 7000 Metre Peaks. Seattle: The Mountaineers. ISBN 0-89886-238-8.
- Soviet military 1:100,000 topographic maps (most from 1980 to 1981)
