= Langtang Ri =

Mountain in the Himalayas

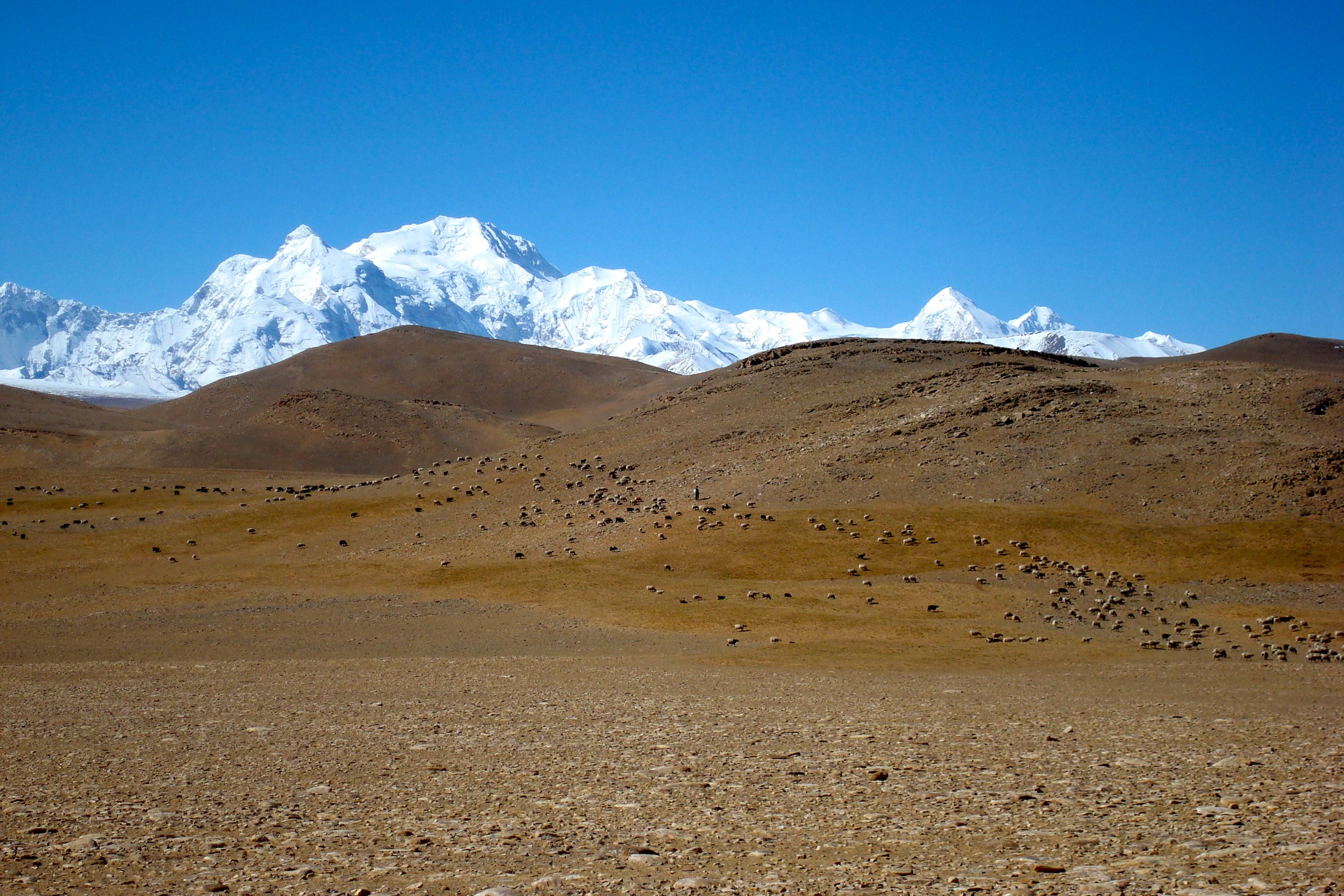

Highest point
- Elevation: 7,205 m (23,638 ft); Ranked 106th
- Prominence: 650 m (2,130 ft)
- Parent peak: Shishapangma
- Listing: Mountains of China; Mountains of Nepal
- Coordinates: 28°22′53″N 85°41′01″E

Geography
- Location within Nepal Location within Tibet
- Location: China–Nepal border
- Parent range: Langtang Himal, Himalayas

Climbing
- First ascent: October 1981 by a Japanese team
- Easiest route: rock/snow/ice climb

Langtang Ri is a mountain in the Langtang Himal of the Himalayas. At an elevation of 7,205 m (23,638 ft) it is the 106th highest mountain in the world. Located on the border between the Bagmati Zone of Nepal and Tibet, China, it is part of a group of high peaks that include Shishapangma (8,013 m) and Porong Ri (7,292 m).

Langtang Ri was first climbed on 10 October 1981 by Noboru Yamada, Makihiro Wakao, Soichi Nasu and Ang Rinji Sherpa.
