= Lost in the Wilderness =

- Theatrical release poster
- Directed by: Jun'ya Satō
- Screenplay by: Yoshiki Iwama; Jun'ya Satō
- Based on: Various writings by Naomi Uemura
- Produced by: Yuzo Irie; Eizo Kitano; Haruyuki Takahashi; Hiroshi Takayama; Moriyoshi Saito; Gohei Kogure; Kazuhiko Mizutani; Junichi Tanaka
- Starring: Toshiyuki Nishida; Chieko Baisho; Masato Furuoya; Go Wakabayashi; Muga Takewaki
- Cinematography: Hiroyuki Namiki; Etsuo Akutsu
- Edited by: Akira Suzuki
- Music by: Philip Aaberg; William Ackerman; Michael Hedges; Kunihiko Murai
- Production companies: Dentsu; Mainichi Broadcasting System
- Distributed by: Toho
- Release date: 7 June 1986 (Japan)
- Running time: 140 minutes
- Country: Japan
- Language: Japanese
- Budget: ¥1.5 billion
- Box office: ¥1.35 billion

Lost in the Wilderness (Japanese: 植村直己物語, Hepburn: Uemura Naomi Monogatari; lit. The Story of Uemura Naomi) is a 1986 Japanese epic biographical adventure drama film directed by Jun'ya Satō. It was co-written by Satō with Yoshiki Iwama. The film is based on the life and writings of Naomi Uemura, a famous Japanese adventurer and mountain climber who went missing on Denali in 1984. It stars Toshiyuki Nishida as Uemura, in addition to Chieko Baisho, Masato Furuoya, Go Wakabayashi and Muga Takewaki. Japanese composer Kunihiko Murai and three members of Windham Hill Records (Philip Aaberg, William Ackerman and Michael Hedges) co-composed the film's score. Lost in the Wilderness was theatrically released by Toho on 7 June 1986, in Japan. Despite failing to recoup its budget at the box office, Lost in the Wilderness was the third highest-grossing Japanese film domestically of 1986.

== Plot ==
The film depicts the life and travels of Naomi Uemura, an adventurer and mountaineer who disappeared on Denali in 1984.

In 1973, Uemura, having just completed a 3,000-kilometer dog sled solo trip in Greenland, returns to Tokyo from his base camp in Siorapaluk. He has not visited his home country for several years. Upon arrival, Uemura reconnects with his old friend Kimiko and, over coffee, shares his life story with her.

Uemura's story begins with his difficult childhood before transitioning to his college years. As a student, Uemura attends Meiji University, and he is part of the university's mountaineering club. But Uemura does not like school. He believes he should be out experiencing the world instead. Dropping out, he decides to come to the United States via a ship from Yokohama with only ¥40,000 in his pocket. However, because he does not have a work visa, he is deported.

Afterwards, he travels to Chamonix, France. While working there, he volunteers for an expedition to the Himalayas. This reignites his passion for mountaineering. When the expedition has concluded, he feels that further group climbs are not suitable for him, so he decides to move forward by climbing solo, ascending the peaks of Mont Blanc, the Matterhorn, Mount Kilimanjaro, Aconcagua and other mountains in the process. Throughout his journeys, he accomplishes several "firsts", such as being the first person to raft the Amazon River solo.

In May 1970, depite his preference for solo climbing, Uemura becomes a member of the Everest International Mountaineering Corps, the first Japanese expedition to reach the summit of Mount Everest. Three months later, he succeeds in climbing Denali, the highest peak in North America, alone, the first person to ever do so. He eventually sets a record for conquering the highest peaks of five continents.

After a few more years, Uemura attempts an early retirement. He goes back to Japan to obtain a regular job. However, he does not last long at any position, and ends up going back to the adventurer lifestyle.

Uemura's story catches up to the present as he recounts his recent expedition in northern Greenland. Over the course of telling the story, Uemura and Kimiko have grown close, with Kimiko experiencing a major emotional reaction to his tale. Upon concluding, Uemura proposes to Kimiko. She accepts his proposal. In 1974, the couple get married. Nonetheless, Uemura does not lose his enthusiasm for journeying and adventure, which puts a strain on his marriage (though Kimiko eventually comes to accept her husband's lifestyle).

He soon makes another solo dog sled trip of 12,000 kilometers in the Arctic Circle, a journey which lasts nearly a year and a half. Along the way, Uemura is attacked by a polar bear. By April 1978, he succeeds in reaching the North Pole solo, the first person to ever do so. Upon his return to Japan, Uemura immediately makes plans to cross Antarctica; however, he gives up on this plan, as he cannot obtain the necessary cooperation of Argentina's government due to the Falklands War.

Kimiko asks Uemura to stay in Japan with her, wanting to spend more time with him and fearing for his safety, but Uemura continues to feel the call of adventure. He attempts another solo climb of Denali. In February 1984, after climbing the mountain alone in the winter season, Uemura's base camp loses contact with him. Despite a desperate search, he is not found. When his death is confirmed on 19 April 1984, the Japanese government presents Uemura with a National Honor Award for his outstanding achievements in life.

== Cast ==
- Toshiyuki Nishida as Naomi Uemura
- Chieko Baisho as Kimiko, Naomi's wife
- Masato Furuoya as Masao Ogawa
- Go Wakabayashi as Hiroto Nagatsuka
- Muga Takewaki as Ishiyama
- Hisano Yamaoka as Hideyo Nazaki
- Nobuko Otowa as Yasuko Moto
- Hideji Ōtaki as Matsutaro Uemura
- Yatsuko Tan'ami as Hatsu Uemura
- Hisashi Igawa as Osamu Uemura
- Toshie Kobayashi as Osamu's wife
- Eitaro Ozawa as Eijiro Nishikawa
- Ryō Ikebe as Sanada
- Yoshihiro Katō as Murata
- Yasuaki Kurata as Hirayama
- Kei Yamamoto as Wakita
- Yū Fujiki as Mitsuo Ogawa
- Tonpei Hidari as Seiji Nozaki
- Masayuki Shionoya as Oizumi
- Kin Sugai as Yoshi Ogawa
- Tomoe Hiiro as Yoshie Ogawa

== Background ==
Naomi Uemura was a Japanese adventurer and mountain climber. He was known for his record-setting solo exploits, such as being the first person to reach the North Pole solo, the first person to raft the Amazon River solo, and the first person to climb Denali solo. He had also solo-climbed Mount Kilimanjaro, Aconcagua, Mont Blanc, and the Matterhorn, all before his 30th birthday, and he summited Mount Everest as part of the 1970 Japanese expedition. He disappeared on 13 February 1984 while descending Denali.

== Production ==
Shortly after Uemura went missing and was presumed dead, Dentsu and Mainichi Broadcasting System conceived a joint film project that would celebrate his life and achievements. Author Makoto Shiina was the top choice for the role of Uemura, as Shiina was a physically active travel writer who had met Uemura twice and befriended him (with one of their dialogues being published in a magazine). Shirō Moritani was the studios' original choice for director. At this early stage of production, Dentsu and Mainichi considered shooting the film in the Japanese Alps to save money.

Shiina ultimately dropped out due to scheduling conflicts with the TBS Television 30th anniversary special Siberia Grand Journey (inspired by his book Journey at Minus 59 Degrees: Makoto Shiina's Siberian Pursuit of Extreme Cold). Moritani, who was in poor health at the time, also had to drop out of the production (he died on 2 December 1984). After Moritani dropped out, Jun'ya Satō was offered the directing job. He was attracted to the story due to the solitary nature of Uemura's adventures. However, director Satō, who had extensive experience shooting on location in other countries, argued "There's no point in making this film unless we show on screen that Uemura traveled all over the world", and that it would be "disrespectful" to his memory if they did not shoot on location. The producers agreed, and Satō was hired. Shortly afterwards, Toshiyuki Nishida replaced Shiina in the lead role. Though Sayuri Yoshinaga and Yukiyo Toake were reportedly in the running to play Uemura's wife, Chieko Baisho was Satō's first choice and ultimately accepted the role. Minoru Horiuchi, Toho's Director of Publicity and Film Coordination at the time, stated that the company wanted to make 1986 "Ms. Baisho's year."

The production was announced on 29 January 1985. It was greenlit with a budget of ¥1.5 billion. The film was Dentsu's first major foray into film production. Isao Matsuoka, Toho's president at the time, stated that he believed Lost in the Wilderness would be "a wonderful film", and that Toho was aiming for "a box office revenue of 5.5 billion yen"; box office expectations were placed on a similar level to Antarctica (1983), which was the highest-grossing Japanese film ever made at the time.

Production commenced on 1 March 1985. Satō used 35 mm film stock and shot in VistaVision. Filming took over a year to complete. The film was shot on location at Denali, the Arctic Circle, Mont Blanc, Greenland, Mount Kilimanjaro, the Amazon rainforest and Mount Everest. Two cinematographers were hired for the production: Hiroyuki Namiki and Etsuo Akutsu. Namiki was the primary cinematographer, while Akutsu was credited with mountain photography.

Location shooting on Everest took place from August to October 1985. The production's base camp was located at 5,350 meters. Filming and route preparation were split between the 11-person crew and the climbing team, both of which were mainly composed of members of the Gunma Prefecture Mountaineering Federation, which included several top Japanese mountaineers of the time. At one point during Everest filming, director Satō developed a stomach ulcer and vomited blood. Many of the cast and crew suffered from health problems, such as high blood pressure and diarrhea. They also experienced a leech infestation during the rainy season.

On 30 October 1985, seven of the crew members summited Everest. Noboru Yamada, who was climbing Everest for the second time (and would climb three eight-thousanders in 1985), made his ascent without the use of an oxygen tank. During their descent, at the base of the South Summit, cinematographer Etsuo Akutsu became disoriented due to snow blindness. He was unable to descend on his own, so climber Satoshi Kimoto stayed behind to help him. The two created a bivouac shelter at an altitude of 8,600 meters below the South Summit. Kazunari Murakami, who was at Camp IV (at an altitude of 7,900 meters) set off alone in the early morning hours to rescue them. He brought an oxygen tank and hot tea with him. Murakami located the two and gave his remaining oxygen to Akutsu. The three survived, but Murakami suffered severe frostbite, resulting in the amputation of all of his toes.

Director Satō later said, "Ten members of the Gunma Prefecture Mountaineering Club stayed with us the whole time and took care of us in various ways, such as [teaching us] how to avoid altitude sickness and providing us with equipment. Without their support, it might have been impossible to shoot this movie. Sadly, I heard that five of them died in the mountains five years after the movie was completed."

Nishida underwent high-altitude acclimatization training in preparation for filming. Crew leader Kuniaki Yagihara supported Nishida and the other cast members during the arduous shooting process. Nishida reportedly cracked jokes on set to lighten the crew's mood. However, he had two close calls during filming, nearly falling into a crevasse at one point and narrowly avoiding an avalanche. Nishida ultimately lost 12 kilograms on Everest. Meanwhile, Nishida's co-star, Masato Furuoya, had a particularly difficult time adjusting to the high altitudes.

Scenes of domestic life between Uemura and his wife were shot in Itabashi, where the couple had actually lived.

== Soundtrack ==
The film's soundtrack, a mixture of orchestral score, electronic music and soft rock, was co-composed by Kunihiko Murai, Philip Aaberg, William Ackerman and Michael Hedges. The latter three were all members of Windham Hill Records, which composed the music in-house. All three Windham Hill members performed on the recordings: Aaberg played piano and synthesizers, Ackerman played guitar, and Hedges played the harp guitar. Other performers included Kenneth Nash on percussion, Malcolm Dalglish on the hammered dulcimer, Eugene Friesen on the cello, Chuck Greenberg on the lyricon, Jeremy Cohen on violin and Charlie Bisharat on electric violin. The album was recorded at Fantasy Studios, Sprocket Systems and Different Fur Studios. Elliot Mazer and Dawn Atkinson served as producers on the recordings, while Grundman Mastering provided mastering services with Brian Gardner as the mastering engineer. The music was recorded on a Sony 3324 digital 24 track tap machine through a Neve 8108 mixer with Necam automation, and also made use of a Klark Teknik DN 780 for ambience and reverb.

The soundtrack album was released in 1986 on vinyl, CD and cassette formats. It was released as The Story of Naomi Uemura in Japan, while it was titled The Shape of the Land (the name of track 5) in other territories. A&M Records distributed the album in the United States. The liner notes include a dedication to Uemura.

"Theme for Naomi Uemura", composed and performed by Aaberg, was released as a 7-inch single in Japan. Its B-side was the non-album track "Warm Wind", which was composed by Ackerman and performed by Bisharat.

All music is composed by Kunihiko Murai, Philip Aaberg, William Ackerman and Michael Hedges:

No.	Title	Length
1.	"Because It's There"	3:02
2.	"Theme for Naomi Uemura"	3:08
3.	"Downhill"	4:36
4.	"When It Snows"	1:21
5.	"The Shape of the Land"	3:19
6.	"Kimiko"	4:20
7.	"Processional"	3:54
8.	"Come Back"	4:19
9.	"The Ice Bear"	2:33
10.	"Aurora/Nevermore"	4:16
11.	"Requiem for a Mountain Climber"	4:34
Total length:		39:22

== Release ==
Lost in the Wilderness was theatrically released by Toho on 7 June 1986, in Japan. It ran from 7 June to 25 July in Toho's theaters, which was considered a long theatrical run for a Japanese film at the time. It grossed ¥1.35 billion in total, making it the third highest-grossing Japanese film domestically of 1986. However, due to its high production costs, it did not make its budget back at the box office.

The film was later released to DVD on 23 January 2004, by Amuse Soft Entertainment.

== Reception ==
The film received mostly positive reviews in its home country.

Essayist Midori Nakano wrote that "Toshiyuki Nishida was completely covered in thick clothes... It was a full-body performance with his face almost completely hidden." She also commented that it was clearly difficult for the crew to shoot, given the extreme environments featured in the film.

Critic Mikio Shibayama stated that, though he was not always a fan of Nishida's sincerity, his willingness to "put his body on the line is his strength". He also complimented the film's "visuals without CGI".

Ayako Saito wrote that "Uemura's (Nishida) friendliness and sincerity come across so earnestly that it's hard [not] to empathize with him."

Writer Naoto Mori said the film was "almost like a documentary" and called it "a grand attempt to genuinely relive the adventures and way of life of an extraordinary mountaineer."

Actress Yoriko Horaguchi, writing for City Road magazine, stated that Lost in the Wilderness is "a... masterpiece that embodies the swapping of Naomi Uemura and Toshiyuki Nishida." She critiqued the film's second half, particularly its focus on Uemura's marriage, but appreciated that the film did not contain a simple moral message, and concluded by saying "It's just a film that traces the life of a man who lived for adventure, but because the person it traces is so great, the film becomes great as well."

In a review for the Los Angeles Times, Kevin Thomas wrote that the film contained an "unusual love story" but criticized Satō and co-writer Iwama's "strictly conventional approach to both their hero's exploits and his romance." Though he believed that Uemura and his wife were portrayed in a three-dimensional manner, he concluded that the film was "tedious" and overlong. Thomas also compared the film unfavorably to the 1975 documentary The Man Who Skied Down Everest. Lost in the Wilderness was the final film shown at L.A.'s Kokusai Theater.

== Awards and nominations ==
10th Japan Academy Awards

- Won: Outstanding Achievement in Sound Recording (Fumio Hashimoto, Yasuo Hashimoto)
- Nominated: Picture of the Year
- Nominated: Director of the Year (Jun'ya Satō)
- Nominated: Outstanding Performance by an Actor in a Leading Role (Toshiyuki Nishida)
- Nominated: Outstanding Performance by an Actress in a Leading Role (Chieko Baisho, also nominated for Women Who Do Not Divorce)
- Nominated: Outstanding Achievement in Lighting Direction (Haruo Kawashima)
- Nominated: Outstanding Achievement in Cinematography (Hiroyuki Namiki, Etsuo Akutsu)

41st Mainichi Film Awards

- Won: Best Sound Recording (Fumio Hashimoto, Yasuo Hashimoto)
- Won: Kinuyo Tanaka Award (Chieko Baisho)
- Won: Readers' Choice Award (Jun'ya Satō)

60th Kinema Junpo Best Ten Awards

- Best Films List: 20th place

4th Golden Gross Awards

- Won: Bronze Excellence Award
