= Naomi Uemura =

Japanese adventurer

- Born: February 12, 1941; Hidaka, Empire of Japan
- Disappeared: February 13, 1984 (aged 43); Alaska, United States
- Status: Missing for 42 years, 8 months and 29 days
- Education: Meiji University

Naomi Uemura (植村 直己, Uemura Naomi; February 12, 1941 – disappeared February 13, 1984) was a Japanese adventurer who was known particularly for his solo accomplishments. He was the first person to reach the North Pole solo, the first person to raft the Amazon River solo, and the first person to climb Denali solo.

Before his 30th birthday, Uemura had solo-climbed Mount Kilimanjaro, Aconcagua, Mont Blanc, and the Matterhorn; had walked the length of Japan; had summited during the first (1970) Japanese expedition to climb Mount Everest; took part in the subsequent disastrous 1971 International Everest Expedition.

Naomi Uemura was a licensed radio amateur operator, signed as JG1QFW. He used amateur radio communication during his expeditions.

== Early life ==
Naomi Uemura was born in Hidaka, now part of Toyooka, Hyōgo, Japan, to a family involved in agriculture. He was the youngest of seven children.

In April 1960, he entered the Department of Agricultural Manufacturing at Meiji University's Faculty of Agriculture. While there, he joined the mountaineering club. He had he begun climbing in college in the hope that mountaineering would make him less shy, and increase his self-confidence.

== Early adventures ==
In 1964, the 23-year-old Uemura left Japan with US$110 (approximately $1185 in 2026 money) and boarded a ship to Los Angeles on a tourist visa.

While in California, Uemura went to work on a farm near Fresno, California. He was soon discovered by the immigration officials, and even though he avoided deportation Uemura was told he must not work illegally, and that he had to leave the country.

On October 20, 1964, he boarded a ship from New York to Le Havre, France, and arrived at Chamonix, France, later that month.

On November 10, 1964, Uemura attempted to solo climb Europe's highest peak, Mont Blanc (4,807 m above sea level). On his third climbing day, he fell into a hidden crevasse on the Bossons Glacier; luckily, he survived.

At the end of 1964, Uemura took a job as a ski patroller at the Avoriaz ski resort in Morzine near the Swiss border, a resort run by Olympic alpine ski racer Jean Vuarnet, to earn money and use that income for his mountaineering journey.

After 2 months of working there, in 1965, Uemura left the job (he would return to the job eventually) to join the Meiji University mountaineering club to hike in the Himalayas, and travel to Kathmandu, Nepal. With the mountaineering club, Uemura hiked Cho Oyu and camped on Ngozumpa glacier along with Sherpas and successfully reached the peak.

In September 1966, Uemura travelled through Kenya to hike Mount Kilimanjaro and Mount Kenya.

After coming back to Avoriaz that November, he set goals for himself in 1967 to visit Greenland, hike Aconcagua solo, and continue improving his French and English.

=== South America ===
Uemura traveled to South America from Spain in December 1967 to hike Mount Aconcagua solo. Unconvinced that he was capable, the local officials told him to obtain military permission, a guarantor, and an agreement from the Japanese embassy in Argentina. Members of the hiking association in Mendoza offered to be the guarantor, and while he was waiting for the military permission, he went to hike Cerro El Plata (altitude 5,968 meters) to demonstrate his abilities. He also summited an unnamed mountain peak in Argentina, and named it "Meiji", after his alma mater, Meiji University.

After successfully summiting Aconcagua, in April 1968, Uemura came to Iquitos, Peru and rafted 6,000 km solo along Amazon River for 60 days, to Macapá, Brazil.

After flying from Brazil to the United States, Uemura returned to California to work at a fruit factory.

He then visited Alaska, hoping to climb Denali (Mt. McKinley); unable to get a hiking permit for McKinley, Uemura solo ascended Mount Sanford, Alaska, completing the fourth ascent of the peak, reaching the summit on September 19, 1968.

=== Mount Everest expeditions ===
In 1968, Uemura returned to Japan briefly. In May 1970, he joined the Japanese Alpine Club's expedition to Mount Everest. He was the first Japanese to have summited Mount Everest.

== North Pole and Greenland ==
Naomi Uemura wrote that he almost gave up twice during his 1978 North Pole trip. On the fourth day of his trek, a polar bear invaded his camp, ate his supplies, and poked his nose against the sleeping bag where Uemura lay tense and motionless. When the bear returned the next day, Uemura was ready and shot him dead.

On the 35th day of the trip, Uemura had hunkered down on an ice floe with his malamute dogs, when there was the roar of breaking ice and the floe cracked into pieces. He and his dogs were stranded on a tossing island of ice. After a night of terror, Uemura found a 3-foot-wide (0.91 m) ice bridge and raced to safety.

Uemura persevered, and became the first person to reach the North Pole solo.

Describing his 57-day push, he wrote, "What drove me to continue then was the thought of countless people who had helped and supported me and the knowledge that I could never face them if I gave up." In this trip, he cooperated with the Canadian Air Force and received his supplies from its helicopters. After the trip, he questioned such extensive support and decided to carry supplies on his own back.

After the North Pole trip, Uemura became the first person to complete a dogsled journey down the entire length of the Greenlandic ice sheet. He completed the trip from May 10 to August 22, 1978. A commemorative plaque noting his accomplishment is located in Narsarsuaq, in the south of Greenland.

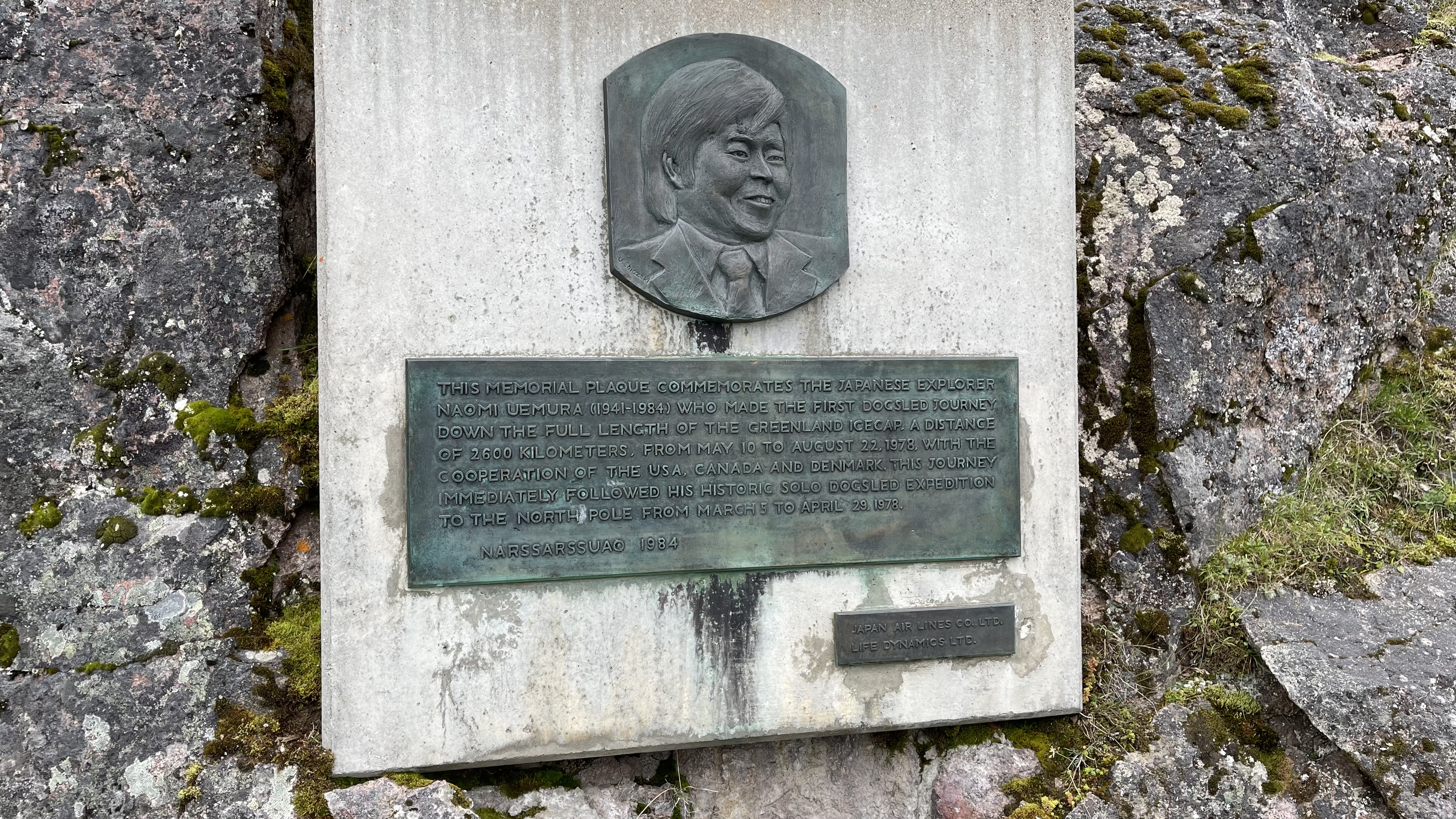

The mountain of Nunatak Uemura in Greenland was named in honour of him. Uemura chose the pinnacles as the ending spot of his 1978 crossing of the island.

== First Denali ascent ==
In August 1970, Naomi Uemura solo-climbed Denali (then known as Mount McKinley), becoming the first person to reach the top alone. He did this quickly and with a light pack (8 days up, versus an average of 14 days or so; 55-pound (25 kg) pack, versus an average probably twice that). August is after the end of the normal climbing season, and so, while the weather he faced was not terrible, the mountain was almost empty with only four other people on it. Though many people have climbed Denali alone since Uemura, most do it in the middle of the climbing season.

Uemura dreamed of soloing across Antarctica and climbing that continent's highest peak, Vinson Massif. In preparation, he did a solo sled-dog run from Greenland to Alaska in 1976, in two stages and 363 days. He set a record for the long-distance record for a dog-sled journey at 12,000 kilometres (7,500 mi).

== Denali winter ascent ==
Naomi Uemura then prepared to climb Denali again solo in winter; however, for people unfamiliar with Alaskan climbing, the difficulty of a winter ascent can often be misjudged. Nobody had successfully climbed any large Alaskan peak in winter until 1967 when Gregg Blomberg organized an expedition that got to the top of Denali (Blomberg himself did not summit). One member of their team died, and the rest of the remaining members of the team were nearly also lost in a storm on the way down. Team member Art Davidson's book, Minus 148, recounts the events of the climb.

There is a high degree of danger with glacier travel, and even short treks across the ice are considered hazardous. For example, glaciers are often broken with cracks, called crevasses, that are often covered with snow and not visible. Due to these occurrences as well as other underlying factors, an ascent is both very difficult and very dangerous to attempt without a team.

Uemura had developed a "self-rescue" device which consisted of bamboo poles tied over his shoulders. The poles would span any crevasse into which he fell and allow him to pull himself out. He planned a very light run, with only a 40-pound (18 kg) pack plus sled. He kept his gear light by planning to sleep in snow caves and therefore freeing himself from needing to carry a tent. He also skimped on fuel and planned to eat cold food.

He began his climb in early February 1984, and reached the summit on February 12, 1984. Sometime later, climbers would find the Japanese flag that he left at the summit.

=== Disappearance ===
On February 13, 1984, one day after his 43rd birthday, Naomi Uemura spoke by radio with Japanese photographers who were flying over Denali, saying that he had made it to the top of the summit and descended back to 18,000 feet (5,500 m); he had planned to reach the base camp in another two days, but never made it.

There appeared to be high winds near the top, and the temperature was around −50 °F (−46 °C). Planes flew over the mountain but did not see him that day. He was spotted around 16,600 feet (5,100 m) the next day (presumably on the ridge just above the headwall), however complications with the weather made further searching difficult.

It was likely that Uemura was running out of fuel at this point, but because of his reputation, nobody wanted to send a rescue party for fear it would offend him. Doug Geeting, one of the bush pilots who had been "Uemura spotting" over the previous week, said, "If it were anybody else, we'd have somebody [a rescuer] on the mountain already". On February 20, 1984, the weather had cleared, but Uemura was nowhere to be found. There was no sign of his earlier camp at 16,600 feet (5,100 m), and no evidence that caches left by other climbers nearby had been disturbed.

Two experienced climbers were dropped at 14,000 feet (4,300 m) to begin a search. Though another storm came in, they stayed on the mountain until February 26, 1984, locating a cave in which Uemura had stayed at 14,000 feet (4,300 m) on the way up, but no sign of Uemura himself. A diary found in the cave revealed that Uemura had left gear there to lighten his load on the summit push. He had also left his self-rescue poles back at 9,500 feet (2,900 m), knowing he was past the worst crevasse fields. Most people figured he had fallen on his descent of the headwall and been hurt, died, and was buried by snow. Another theory is that he could have made it to 14,200 feet (4,300 m) (which is the base of the headwall), then fallen into one of the many crevasses there and died.

A group of Japanese climbers arrived to look for the body. They failed, though they did locate much of his gear at 17,200 feet (5,200 m).

The diary found in the cave at 14,000 feet (4,300 m) has been published in Japanese and English; it describes the conditions that Uemura suffered— the crevasse falls, −40° weather, frozen meat, and inadequate shelter. The diary entries showed him to be in good spirits and documented the songs he sang to stay focused on his task.

The last entry read, "I wish I could sleep in a warm sleeping bag. No matter what happens I am going to climb McKinley."

== Legacy ==
Naomi Uemura gave frequent public lectures and wrote about his travels. His adventure books for children were popular in Japan. There is a museum dedicated to him in Tokyo, Japan, and another in Toyooka, Hyōgo.

Uemura's alma mater, Meiji University, awarded him an honorary doctorate in June 1984.

He was posthumously awarded People's Honor Award.

An award named for him, the Naomi Uemura Prize, was created in Japan after his death, to honour outstanding adventurers.

An adventure-drama movie about him, Lost in the Wilderness (Japanese: 植村直己物語, Hepburn: Uemura Naomi monogatari, "The story of Uemura Naomi") was released in 1986.

Uemura is remembered not only as a gifted climber and a driven adventurer but also as a gentle, self-effacing man who cared about others. In the words of author Jonathan Waterman, "[Just as remarkable] as his solo achievements were his sincere modesty and unassuming nature. Another part of his greatness lay in his deep interest in everyone he met."

== Bibliography ==
Year	Japanese Title	English Title
1971	青春を山に賭けて	Betting the Youth on the Mountains
1974	極北に駆ける	Run to the Far North
1976	北極圏一万二千キロ	12,000 kilometers above the Arctic Circle
1978	北極点グリーンランド単独行	Solo trip to North Pole Greenland
1980	冒険	Adventures

== See also ==
- Noboru Yamada, Japanese mountaineer who would later die on Denali in similar circumstances
- List of 20th-century summiters of Mount Everest
- List of people who disappeared
- Seven Summits

== Sources ==
- The Rescue Season, Bob Drury 2001
- To the Top of Denali, Bill Sherwonit 2000
- High Alaska: A Historical Guide to Denali Mount Foraker and Mount Hunter, Jonathan Waterman 1989
- The north pole - Answers
