= Karjiang =

Mountain in Tibet, China

- Location within Tibet

Highest point
- Elevation: 7,221 m (23,691 ft); Ranked 99th
- Prominence: 880 m (2,890 ft)
- Parent peak: Kula Kangri
- Listing: Mountains of China
- Coordinates: 28°15′29″N 90°38′50″E

Geography
- Country: China
- Region: Tibet Autonomous Region
- Parent range: Himalayas

Climbing
- First ascent: August 13, 2024 by Liu Yang and Song Yuancheng.

Karjiang is a mountain in the Tibet Autonomous Region, located near the Bhutan–Tibet border. The highest peak of the Karjiang group is Karjiang I or Karjiang South, with an elevation of 7,221 metres (23,691 ft); it was summited on August 13, 2024, by Liu Yang and Song Yuancheng. Other peaks include Karjiang North (7196 m), Karjiang II/Central (7045 m), Karjiang III or Taptol Kangri (6820 m) and the top of the north-eastern shoulder (6400 m).

== Attempts ==
In 1986, a Japanese expedition led by N. Shigo climbed Karjiang II (Central).

A Dutch expedition attempted to climb Karjiang during September–October 2001 without success. The group consisted of Haroen Schijf, Rudolf van Aken, Pepijn Bink, Court Haegens, Willem Horstmann and Rein-Jan Koolwijk. The group climbed Karjiang III. According to Schijf, Karjiang I looked very steep and difficult to climb, and the bad weather made an attempt too dangerous.

In 2010, Joe Puryear and David Gottlieb gained the Shipton-Tilman Award for an attempt to climb Karjiang. However, they did not receive the necessary permit and made an attempt to climb Labuche Kang 420 kilometres (260 mi) to the west, during which Puryear died.

In 2024, a Chinese expedition led by Liu Tang made the first recorded ascent of the main summit. They faced deep snow on the way up and summited on August 13, 2024.
