= Noboru Yamada =

Japanese mountaineer (1950–1989)

- やまだ のぼる
- Born: 山田昇; February 9, 1950; Numata City, Gunma Prefecture
- Died: February 24, 1989 (aged 39); McKinley, Alaska
- Cause of death: Fall, exposure
- Body discovered: March 30, 1989
- Years active: 1968–1989
- Organization: Gunma Mountaineering Association
- Known for: Himalayan alpinism
- Honours: 4807 Noboru, a main-belt asteroid

Noburu Yamada (9 February 1950 – 24 February 1989) was a Japanese mountaineer known for his extensive climbing experience in the Himalayas, including several first ascents and for his proficiency for climbing during winter. A contemporary of Reinhold Messner and Jerzy Kukuczka, Yamada reached the summits of 9 of the 14 eight-thousanders and was part of the climbing team that made the second successful winter ascent of Mount Everest. Six of these ascents were done without oxygen. He died while climbing Denali in 1989. 4807 Noboru, a main-belt asteroid is named after him.

== Biography ==
Yamada was born in 1950 in Numata City, Gunma Prefecture. He began climbing while a student and joined the Numata Mountaineering Club.

=== Himalayan expeditions ===
Yamada began trekking in the Himalayas in the late 1970s. He would make 22 expeditions to the Himalayas over 15 years, and would make 16 attempts at climbing the region's 8,000m peaks.

On October 19, 1978, Yamada summitted his first eight-thousander, Dhaulagiri I (8167 m). A member of an 18-member expedition party led by Seiko Tanaka, the expedition was perilous. Only five members would summit, and four members of the party would lose their lives in the attempt.

Yamada would not return to the Himalayas until 1981. That year, he took part in three expeditions, a successful ascent of Kangchenjunga on May 9, 1981 via Yalung Kang. That fall, he returned to the Himalayas. On October 10, 1981, Yamada was part of a Japanese expedition team which made the first successful ascent of Langtang Ri in the Langtang Himal.

On October 18, 1982, Yamada, Kozu Komatsu and Yasuhira Saito made a successful first ascent of the Pear Route up Dhaulagiri.

In December 1982, Yamada was leading a winter expedition up Manaslu via the normal route when expedition member Takashi Sakuma fell to his death at 24,600 feet. The expedition gave up their summit attempt after Sakuma's death.

In 1983, Yamada was part of a successful summit team that first climbed Lhotse and then Everest via the South Col. It was the second winter ascent of Mount Everest.

In 1985, Yamada would climb three eight-thousanders, becoming the third person in the world to climb three of the world's highest peaks in the same year. In July 1985, Yamada joined the Himalayan Association of Japan for a climbing expedition to K2. Yamada summitted K2 without oxygen on 24 July. In October 1985, Yamada made his second summit of Mount Everest, and his first ascent without bottled oxygen as part of the crew filming a movie about Naomi Uemura. That December, he summited Manaslu.

In December 1986, Yamada and climbing partner Yasuhira Saito attempted an alpine-style ascent of Makalu during the winter season. The pair reached a high point of 7,500 before descending due to poor snow conditions.

On 6 November 1988, Yamada successfully summited Cho Oyu.

=== Winter ascent of Annapurna ===
In the winter of 1984–1985, Yamada was part of a Gunma Mountaineering Association climbing expedition attempting the first winter ascent of the South face of Annapurna. The team reached a high point of 7200m, and were turned back due to heavy snowfall and inexperience on the mountain. Three years later, on 20 December 1987, Yamada, and climbing partners Yasuhira Saito, Teruo Saegusa and Toshiyuki Kobayashi returned to Annapurna where they successfully made the first winter summit of the south face of Annapurna. It was also the first ascent of Annapurna in winter by a Japanese team, and marked Yamada's seventh eight-thousander. On the way down, two members of Yamada's climbing team fell to their deaths due to fatigue.

=== Final climb ===
On February 16, 1989, Yamada flew into Kahiltna Basecamp to lead an expedition up Denali's West Buttress. Yamada was climbing Denali in an attempt to complete the Seven Summits. Prior to his attempt at Denali, Yamada had climbed Everest, Mont Blanc, Aconcagua and Kilimanjaro in the previous 135 days. Extreme wind conditions kept the Japanese team in their high camp at 5,200 meters for several days. The Japanese team was last seen on February 22. On February 26, after the Japanese team was expected to return to basecamp, the team was suspected lost. On 13 March 1989, the bodies of Yamada, Teruo Saegusa and Kozo Komatsu were sighted by an overhead aircraft. On 30 March 1989, the climbers bodies were found by a recovery team, who found them roped together. It is assumed the group attempted to reach the summit during a break in the weather, but fell on the ascent.

== Legacy ==
In 1994, Yamada's brother opened the Yamada Noboru Himalayan Museum in Numata City. The museum later closed and the collection was later exhibited in the Tanigawa Mountaineering Museum.

Yamada is memorialized by 4807 Noboru, an asteroid. Later, he was honored with the Yamada Noboru Memorial Cup, a skyrunning competition on Mt. Hotaka.

== Expeditions ==
- 1975 Summer: Trekking in the Latok Mountains
- 1978 Autumn: October 21st, summit of the southeast ridge of Dhaulagiri Peak (8167 m)
- 1980 Autumn: October 1st Kedarnath Dome (6831 m) summit
- 1981 Spring: May 9th, summit of Kanchenjunga (8586 m)
- 1981 Autumn: October 10th: First ascent of Langtang Ri (7205 m)
- 1982 Autumn: October 18th, Dhaulagiri (8167 m) North Face Pair Route Climbing
- 1983 Autumn: Mount Lhotse (8516 m)
- 1983 Winter: December 16th, summit of the southeast ridge of Mt. Everest (8,848 m)
- 1984 Autumn: September 13th: Summit of Mamostong Kangri (7526 m)
- 1985 Summer: July 24th, K2 (8611 m) southeast ridge ascent without oxygen
- 1985 Autumn: October 30th, climbing the southeast ridge of Mt. Everest (8,848 m) without oxygen
- 1985 Winter: December 14th Manaslu (8163 m) normal route without oxygen
- 1986: Polish-Japanese Trango Expedition to Trango Towers (unsuccessful)
- 1987 Winter: December 20th, summit of the south face of Annapurna (8091 m)
- 1988 Spring: May 5th: Climb and traverse Mt. Everest (8,848 m)
- 1988 Summer: June 10th, summit of Mt. McKinley (6194 m), Alaska
- 1988 Summer: Climbing the European Alps
- 1988 Winter: September 5th, South America, Aconcagua (6959 m) summit
- 1988 Winter: September 16th: Summit of Mount Kilimanjaro (5,895 m)
- 1988 Autumn: October 24th Shishapangma (8013 m) summit without oxygen
- 1988 Autumn: November 6th Cho Oyu (8201 m) summit without oxygen
- 1989 Winter: February 7th: Solo summit of Mont Blanc (4807 m)
- 1989 Winter: February 24th (Japan time) Disaster and death (presumed) on Mount McKinley

== See also ==
- Wojciech Kurtyka, climbing partner for attempts on the Trango Towers, 1986
- Naomi Uemura, Japanese mountaineer who also died on Denali
