= Gurla Mandhata =

Mountain in Tibet, China

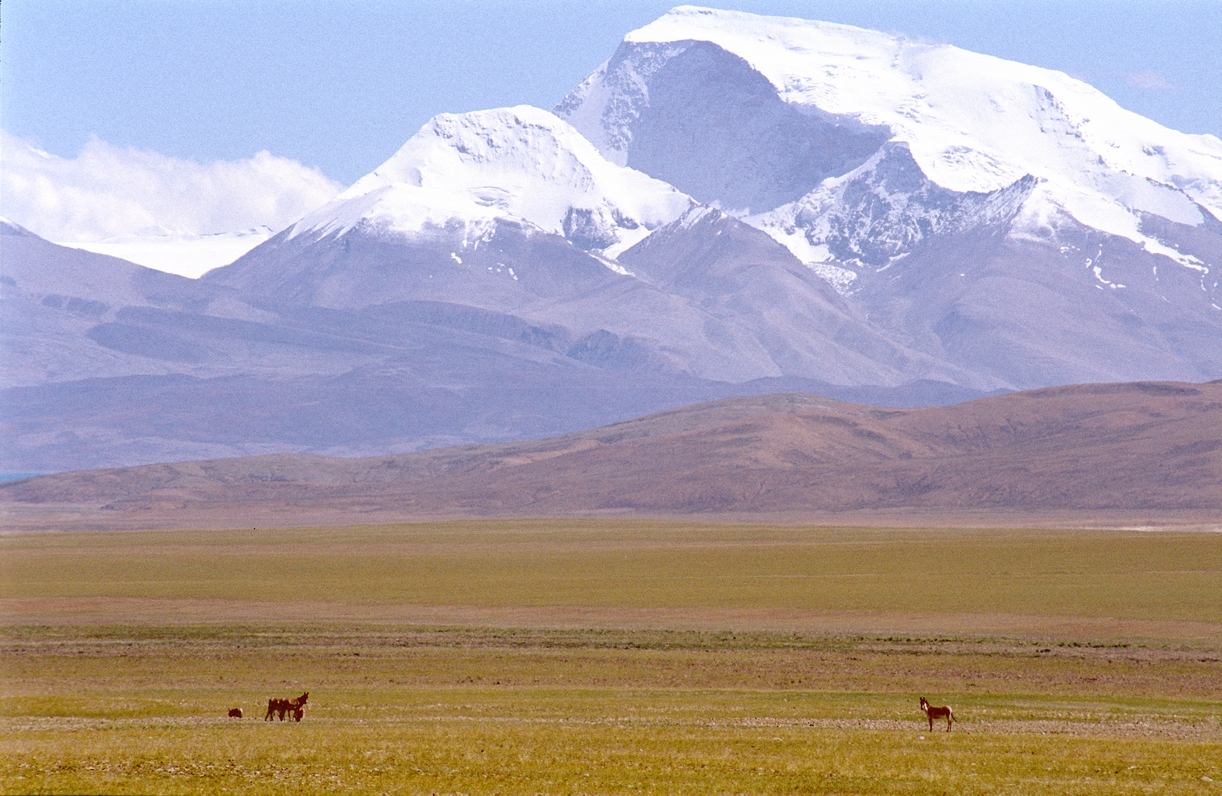
- Gurla Mandhata

Highest point
- Elevation: 7,694 m (25,243 ft); Ranked 34th
- Prominence: 2,788 m (9,147 ft)
- Listing: Ultra
- Coordinates: 30°26′09″N 81°17′45″E

Geography
- The major peaks (not mountains) above 7,500 m (24,600 ft) height in Himalayas, rank identified in Himalayas alone (not the world). Legend: 1：Mount Everest; 2：Kangchenjunga; 3：Lhotse; 4：Yalung Kang, Kanchenjunga West; 5：Makalu; 6：Kangchenjunga South; 7：Kangchenjunga Central; 8：Cho Oyu; 9：Dhaulagiri; 10：Manaslu (Kutang); 11：Nanga Parbat (Diamer); 12：Annapurna; 13：Shishapangma (Shishasbangma, Xixiabangma); 14：Manaslu East; 15：Annapurna East Peak; 16： Gyachung Kang; 17：Annapurna II; 18：Tenzing Peak (Ngojumba Kang, Ngozumpa Kang, Ngojumba Ri); 19：Kangbachen; 20：Himalchuli (Himal Chuli); 21：Ngadi Chuli (Peak 29, Dakura, Dakum, Dunapurna); 22：Nuptse (Nubtse); 23：Nanda Devi; 24：Chomo Lonzo (Chomolonzo, Chomolönzo, Chomo Lönzo, Jomolönzo, Lhamalangcho); 25：Namcha Barwa (Namchabarwa); 26：Zemu Kang (Zemu Gap Peak); 27：Kamet; 28：Dhaulagiri II; 29：Ngojumba Kang II; 30：Dhaulagiri III; 31：Kumbhakarna Mountain (Mount Kumbhakarna, Jannu); 32：Gurla Mandhata (Naimona'nyi, Namu Nan); 33：Hillary Peak (Ngojumba Kang III); 34：Molamenqing (Phola Gangchen); 35：Dhaulagiri IV; 36：Annapurna Fang; 37：Silver Crag; 38：Kangbachen Southwest; 39：Gangkhar Puensum (Gangkar Punsum); 40：Annapurna III; 41：Himalchuli West; 42：Annapurna IV; 43：Kula Kangri; 44：Liankang Kangri (Gangkhar Puensum North, Liangkang Kangri); 45：Ngadi Chuli South
- Location: Tibet Autonomous Region, China
- Parent range: Nalakankar Himal, Himalaya

Climbing
- First ascent: 1985 by Cirenuoji, Jiabu, Jin Junxi, K. Matsubayashi, Song Zhiyu, K. Suita, Y. Suita, T. Wada
- Easiest route: West flank: snow/ice climb

Namu Nani

Chinese name
- Traditional Chinese: 納木那尼峰
- Simplified Chinese: 纳木那尼峰
- Literal meaning: [phonetic from Tibetan]
Transcriptions
Standard Mandarin
- Hanyu Pinyin: Nàmù Nàní Fēng
- Wade–Giles: Na-mu Na-ni Feng

Naimona'nyi

Tibetan name
- Tibetan: གནས་མོ་སྣ་གཉིས མེ་མོ་ ན་ ཉི་
Transcriptions
- Wylie: Gnas Mo Sna Gnyis; Ne Mo Na Nyi
- THL: Nemonanyi; Nemo Na Nyi
- Tibetan Pinyin: Naemona'nyi; Nêmo Na Nyi

Gurla Mandhata, also Naimona'nyi or Namu Nani, is the highest peak of the Nalakankar Himal, a small subrange of the Himalaya. It lies in Burang County of the Ngari Prefecture in the Tibet Autonomous Region of China, near the northwest corner of Nepal. It is the 34th-highest peak in the world (using a 500-metre prominence cutoff). It is also notable for being well within the interior of the Tibetan Plateau (most peaks of similar height – except notably Shishapangma, the world's 14th-highest peak – lie nearer to or outside the edge of the Plateau) and relatively far away from other peaks with heights greater than 7,500 metres. It sits roughly across Lake Manasarovar from the sacred peak of Mount Kailash.

== Names ==
Gurla Mandhata is a romanization of the Hindi name गुरला मन्धाता, Sanskrit: गन्धमादन. It supposedly derives from a pass near the mountain and the legendary prehistoric Indian king Mandhata of the Raghuvaṃśa branch of the Solar Dynasty, who supposedly conquered the earth and passed the mountain on his way to the sacred lake Manasarovar beside the axis mundi Mount Kailash. In some versions of the story, the mountain is his body, transformed after death.

Naimona'nyi is the Tibetan pinyin romanization of the Tibetan name གནས་མོ་སྣ་གཉིས།. The Wylie transcription of the same name is Gnas Mo Sna Gnyis. The name is also sometimes written as མེ་མོ་ ན་ ཉི་, Nemo Na Nyi. The American Alpine Journal has explained the name as deriving from naimo (supposedly meaning "traditional Tibetan medicine"), na ("black"), and nyi ("slab" or "slabs") but Chinese sources say it instead means "Mountain of Our Lady" or "the Goddess". This is sometimes mistakenly translated as "Fairy" via the Chinese word 仙, which actually refers to a Taoist immortal or similar minor deities rather than a western fairy.

Namu Nani is the atonal pinyin romanization of the Chinese name written 納木那尼峰 in traditional characters or 纳木那尼峰 in simplified ones, transcribed Nàmù Nàní Fēng with its tones. The name is a transcription into Chinese of the Tibetan name, with the addition of the final character 峰, meaning "peak".

== Climbing history ==
In 1905, T. G. Longstaff made an attempt on the west face of Gurla Mandhata with two alpine guides and six porters. After suffering a 900 feet (270 m) fall during an avalanche, they turned back around 7,000 m (23,000 ft) upon finding fresh snow was falling too heavily to reach the summit with their provisions. This was a strong achievement for the time, especially for such a small group; at that time no summit of over 7,000 m had yet been climbed and Longstaff's height represented a world altitude record.

In 1935, the Viennese student Herbert Tichy made a trip to the holy mountain Kailash while disguised as an Indian pilgrim. On the way, he attempted Gurla Mandhata with one of his porters, Kitar. They reached a height of 23,400 feet (7,100 m) before being turned back by fresh snow and bad weather.

In 1955, the mountain was the intended destination of the inaugural Welsh Himalayan Expedition led by Sydney Wignall. The expedition was sponsored by the Liverpool Daily Post and intended to summit Gurla Mandata and plant three flags: the Welsh Dragon, the flag of the recently overthrown Chinese Republic, and the Jolly Roger. Before the climb could begin, the group was captured by the Chinese military, who imprisoned and tortured the climbers for two months under the belief they were CIA spies. (Wignall had in fact offered to spy for India.)

The first successful ascent was by a joint Sino-Japanese team led by Katsutoshi Hirabayashi in May 1985, reaching the peak via its north face. Since that time, there have been six additional successful ascents and two failed attempts on the peak.

In 1997, an attempt was made to ascend the peak via the then-unclimbed North Face route by Quinn Simons, Soren Peters, and their guide, Charlie Fowler. The team made a valiant effort, climbing high on the mountain, but after severe storms and other difficulties had to retreat. Their descent ended in a fall of some 450 m (1,500 ft) down the North Face of the peak. Fowler was slightly injured, while Simons and Peters both suffered extreme frostbite on their extremities.

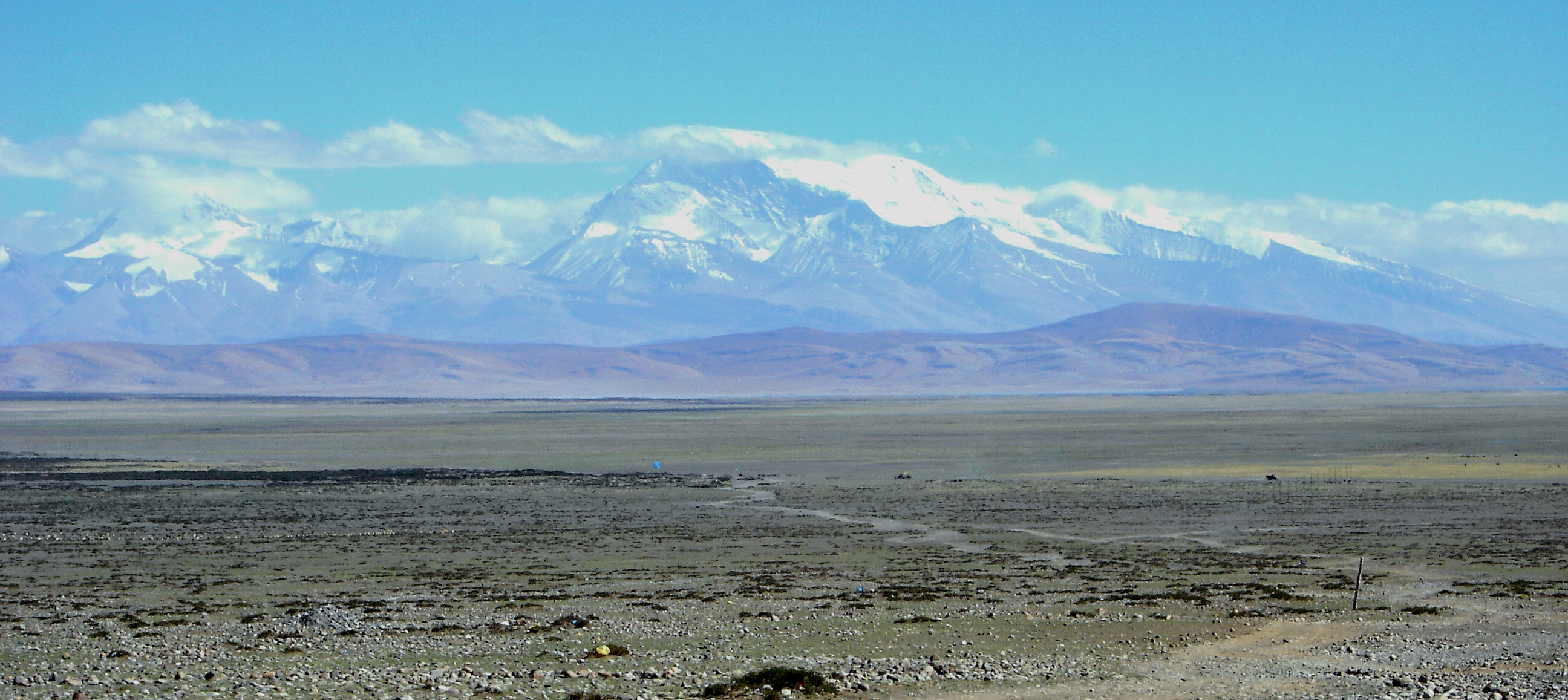
View from Darchen over the Barkha plain

The standard ascent route climbs the western flanks of the mountain ascending the Chaglung'mlungha Glacier to the summit plateau. Most teams choose to approach the mountain overland by jeep from either Lhasa, Tibet, or Kathmandu, Nepal. However, an alternate approach begins in the mountain hamlet of Simikot, Nepal, in the remote Humla district of west Nepal and follows the Karnali River northward, crossing into Tibet (China) in the village of Sher. Jeeps then take climbers north through Taklakot (Burang) to basecamp on the mountain.

== Glaciology ==
Glaciers surrounding Gurla Mandhata have been studied using satellite imagery. A study published in 2006 found that glacier area in the region decreased from 84.41 square kilometres in 1976 to 77.29 square kilometres in 2003, a reduction of approximately 8.4%.

== See also ==
- List of ultras of the Himalayas
