= Porong Ri =

Mountain in the Himalayas

- Location within Tibet

Highest point
- Elevation: 7,292 m (23,924 ft); Ranked 85th
- Prominence: 520 m (1,710 ft)
- Parent peak: Shishapangma
- Coordinates: 28°23′13″N 85°43′07″E

Geography
- Location: Tibet, China
- Parent range: Langtang Himalayas

Climbing
- First ascent: May 14, 1982 by a Japanese team
- Easiest route: snow/ice climb

Porong Ri is a mountain in the Langtang region of the Himalayas. At 7,292 m (23,924 ft), it is the 85th highest mountain in the world. The peak is located in Tibet, China, about one kilometre northeast of the Nepal border.

Porong Ri was first climbed on May 14, 1982 by a Japanese expedition team.
