= Nalakankar Himal =

Mountain subrange of the Himalayas

The Nalakankar Himal is a small subrange of the Himalayan range located in southern Tibet and the northwest corner of Nepal, lying south of Lake Manasarowar. Its southern boundary is defined by the Humla Karnali, a tributary of the Karnali river, one of the major rivers in western Nepal. This river separates the range from the Gurans Himal to the south and the eastern Kumaon to the southwest. To the east, the pass known as Lapche La marks the dividing point between the Nalakankar Himal and the Chandi Himal. To the north and northwest, the range gradually transitions into the northern foothills of the Himalayas and the Tibetan Plateau.

The range has only three named peaks, of which only one is over 7,000 meters (22,966 feet), namely Gurla Mandhata, or Naimona'nyi, which stands at 7,694 meters(25,242 feet).
