= David Lama =

Austrian rock climber and mountaineer (1990–2019)

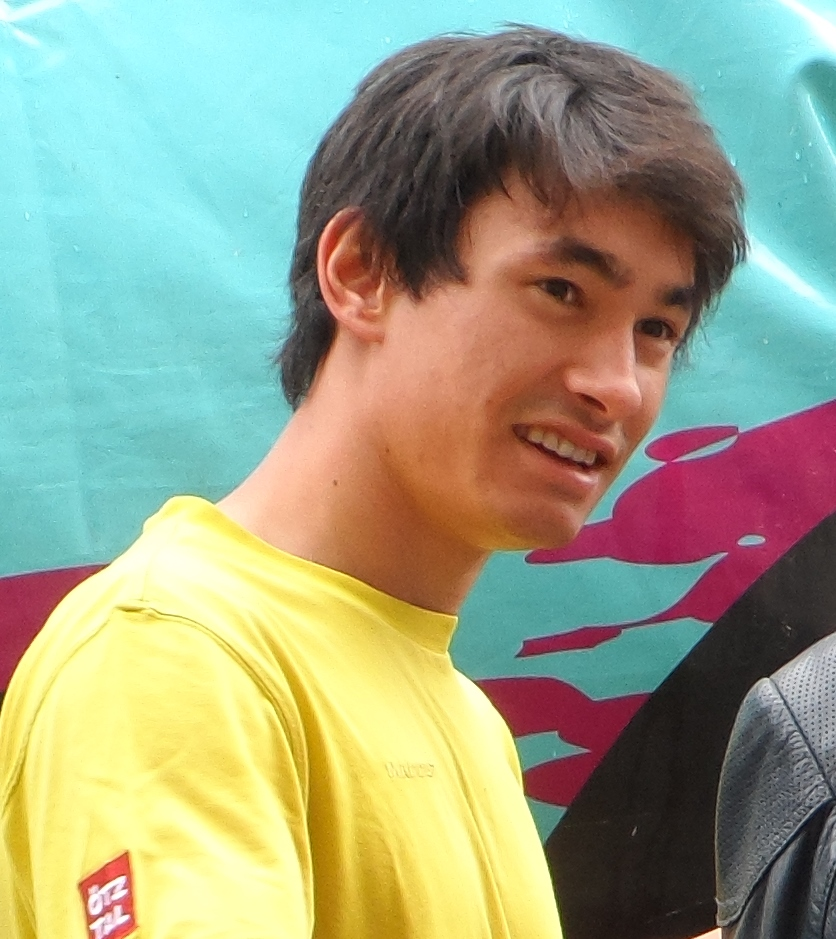
- Lama in 2014

Personal information
- Nationality: Austrian
- Born: 4 August 1990 Innsbruck, Austria
- Died: 16 April 2019 (aged 28) Howse Peak, Alberta, Canada
- Website: www.david-lama.com

Climbing career
- Type of climber: Competition climbing; Sport climbing; Bouldering; Alpine climbing
- Highest grade: Redpoint: 9a (5.14d)
- Retired from competition: 2011
Medal record
Men's competition climbing
Representing Austria
IFSC World Championships
Bronze medal – third place	2009 Xining	Lead
IFSC European Championships
Gold medal – first place	2006 Yekaterinburg	Lead
Gold medal – first place	2007 Birmingham	Bouldering
IFSC Climbing World Cup
Winner	2008	Overall
- Updated on 13 May 2013

David Lama (Nepali: डेभिड लामा; 4 August 1990 – 16 April 2019) was an Austrian rock climber and alpinist. He won the European Championship in competition bouldering in 2007 and the European Championship in competition lead climbing in 2006. He is known for his first free ascent of the Compressor Route (South-East Ridge) on Cerro Torre. In 2018, in a solo expedition, he was the first to reach the summit of Lunag Ri in the Himalayas. In 2019, he was posthumously honoured with a Piolet d'Or for this first ascent.

== Biography ==
David Lama was born in 1990. His father is a mountain guide from Nepal and his mother is an Austrian from Innsbruck. He was five years old when Himalaya veteran Peter Habeler first watched Lama climb in a climbing camp organized by Habeler. Afterward, Habeler immediately called Lama's parents to tell them that their boy had an unusual talent. Lama then became part of the competition climbing team coached by Reinhold Scherer.

=== Competition climbing ===
In 2004, 14 years old, Lama won the European Youth Cup. In the same year, he climbed his first 5.14b (8c) route.

He repeated his win at the European Youth Cup in 2005 and moved on to Senior competitions in 2006. The International Federation for Sport Climbing (IFSC) changed their rules so that Lama, only 15 years old at the time, could compete in the Senior World Cup. Lama became the youngest person to compete at the World Cup and the first to win both a lead and a bouldering World Cup final in his first season.

Lama became European Champion both in competition lead climbing (2006) and in competition bouldering (2007). In 2008 he won the overall ranking in the World Cup. In 2009, he placed 3rd at the World Championships in the lead discipline.

In 2011, he retired from competition climbing so he could focus solely on mountaineering.

=== Mountaineering ===
==== Cerro Torre ====
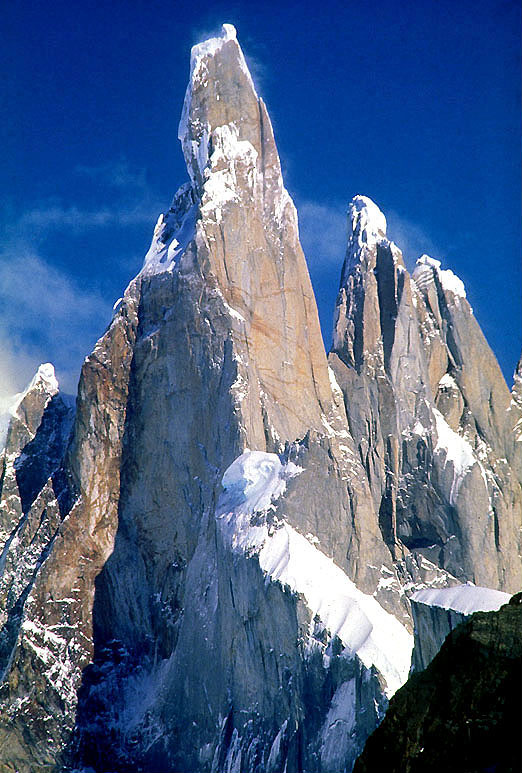
Cerro Torre in the Southern Patagonian Ice Field, South America

In 2009, Lama announced his intention to free climb Cerro Torre via the Compressor Route, which means only natural rock and ice formations are used for the ascent of the mountain. Bolts and rope only serve as protection in case of a fall. Nobody had done this before, all previous ascents had used climbing aids of one kind or another. Alpinist legend Reinhold Messner even called the undertaking "crazy and impossible".

For his first attempt in 2009, Lama brought along a film crew provided by his sponsor Red Bull. This first attempt ended in failure. Lama and his climbing partner Daniel Steuerer had to turn around due to bad weather. Back at base camp the conditions stayed bad and the team had to abandon the endeavor for the 2009/2010 season.

The aftermath of this first attempt started a scandal in the mountaineering scene. Both Lama and the Red Bull film crew were heavily criticized. The film crew had left behind at least 30 drilled bolts next to a route already laden with bolts. 700 metres of fixed rope and five haul bags were also left behind along the route. Argentinian guides were hired to remove the equipment, but they did not manage to remove all of it and none of the bolts were removed.

Lama stated that he was not aware of the large number of bolts that were drilled by the film team, but he took full responsibility for the actions and promised not to repeat the mistake. He promised to remove the remaining equipment in the following year.

They returned for a second attempt in January 2011. Peter Ortner, a more experienced climber, replaced Steuerer as Lama's climbing partner from this point onward. This initial ascent had to be aborted as well because the headwall was full of ice. On 12 February, during a small good weather window, the two climbers managed to reach the summit using some aid techniques. This ascent raised the morale of the team after the long series of failures and was used for scouting out the free route.

In January 2012, Lama and his team returned for a third expedition. A few days before the planned ascent they got the news that the climbers Jason Kruk and Hayden Kennedy had completed the compressor route, using as few bolts as they could manage. On their way back down they removed all the bolts they deemed unnecessary in order to restore the challenge of the mountain. They removed more than 120 bolts in total, most of them from the historical 1970 Cesare Maestri gas-powered compressor ascent. The headwall of the compressor route and one pitch below were completely freed of bolts. This move caused a heated debate in the mountaineering community. Both climbers were briefly detained by Argentinian police and the removed bolts were confiscated.

Lama's first reaction was that he did not need the bolts for his climb anyway and he moved ahead with his free climbing attempt. Since the old bolted route was not climbable anymore by regular means, the film crew had to ascend the summit via the west side of the mountain and rappel down with ropes in order to document the next attempt.

On 19 January 2012, Lama and Ortner finished the first free ascent of Cerro Torre via the south-east ridge compressor route in 24 hours in total. According to Lama, they brought five bolts along, but they did not have to place any of them. They ascended to the left of the crack climbed by Salvaterra and Mabboni, here Lama took one fall, but he managed to climb it on the second attempt. He later rated this crux 8a (5.13b) in terms of difficulty. The two climbers slept for the night in bivouac sacks below the Ice Towers. On the next day, after ascending most of the headwall, they went right of the compressor, following cracks and flakes in the rock, all the way to the summit. All previous routes went left of the compressor.

In 2013, National Geographic made David Lama "Adventurer of the Year" for his free ascent of Cerro Torre.

The documentary Cerro Torre: A Snowball's Chance in Hell documents the ascent.

==== Lunag Ri ====
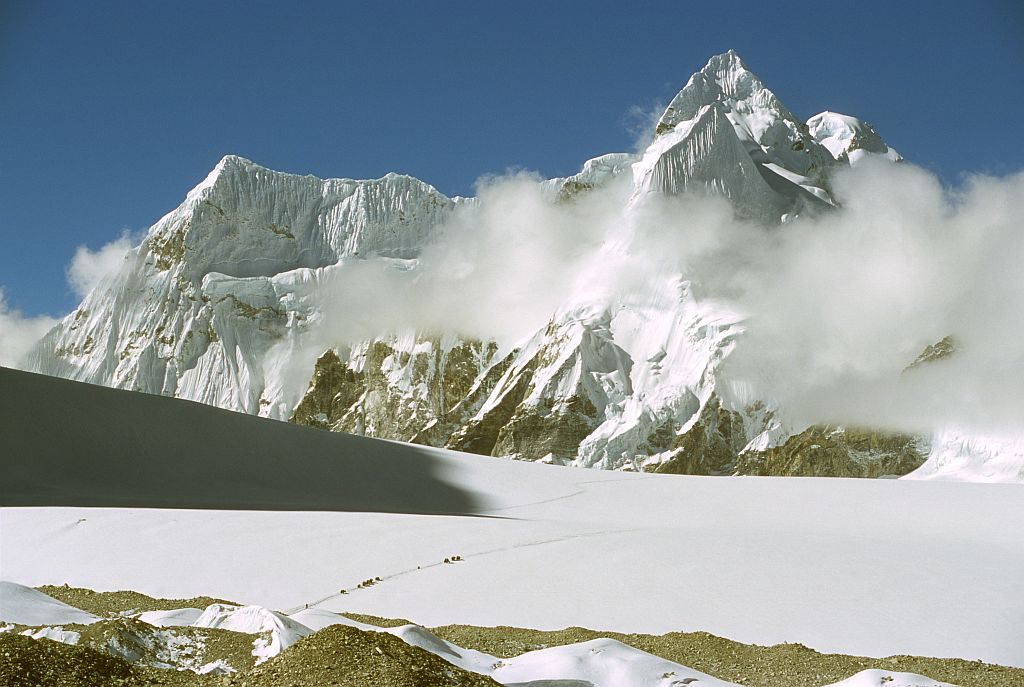
View of Nangpa La and the Lunag Ri-massif, seen from the Cho Oyu base camp. The top of Lunag Ri is on the far right of the picture, half right in the background is the Lunag Ri IV, behind on the far left is the Jobo Rinjang.

In 2015, Lama teamed up with American climber Conrad Anker in order to climb the 6,895 m (22,621 ft) Lunag Ri, one of the highest unclimbed peaks in the Himalayas.

Their first attempt was on 12 November 2015. They picked a rock crevice that would allow them to climb up to the northwest pillar of the mountain. Up on the ridge they planned to follow it up to the peak using mixed climbing techniques. It was already late when they reached the top of the ridge, so for the night they set up a bivouac underneath a boulder. They continued in the early morning of the next day. Lack of ice and bad snow conditions complicated protection. They did not manage to reach the summit during the next day. They had to make the decision whether to dig in and wait out another night, at potential temperatures of -40 °C and strong wind, or turn around and descend the mountain. They decided for the latter and aborted the attempt around 300 metres below the summit.

They had to abandon the endeavor for that year, but returned for a second attempt in 2016.

On 6 November 2016, during the second attempt, Anker had a heart attack at a height of 6,000 metres (20,000 ft) while climbing up the rock crevice. The two climbers quickly decided to rappel down the mountain. Lama called for an emergency helicopter rescue at base camp. Twelve hours after the heart attack, Anker underwent surgery in Kathmandu. A thrombotic occlusion was removed from his proximal left anterior descending artery. As a result of this injury Anker quit high-altitude climbing.

Lama was left behind without a climbing partner at the base camp. Since Anker had declared that he would not return, Lama decided to start another attempt alone.

This third attempt was started on 8 November 2016. Lama ascended the north-west ridge via a longer, but easier rock crevice and set up camp. Since he had no climbing partner he had to use roped solo techniques in order to ascend the ridge, climbing one pitch as lead, setting up an anchor and then rappeling back down to remove protections. Ascending the mountain this way together with a heavy backpack turned out to be too much of a challenge. Lama aborted this third attempt as well, not far from the location of the high point of the first expedition with Conrad Anker.

On 23 October 2018, Lama returned for a fourth and final attempt. Again solo, he ascended the mountain in three days over the north-west ridge. He followed the same line he had taken on his first solo attempt. He had to set up a bivouac two times for the nights at temperatures of -30 °C with 80 km/h storm gusts. During the entire third day he was unable to feel his toes. He decided to push on despite this and reached the summit at 10:00 a.m. After a few minutes on the summit, he immediately rappeled back down. At midnight he was back at base camp. He did not lose any of his toes.

=== Death ===
On 16 April 2019, Lama, along with climbers Jess Roskelley and Hansjörg Auer, was caught in an avalanche on Howse Peak in the Waputik Range of the Canadian Rockies. The group had climbed a new route on the east face of Howse Peak, one of the most challenging Canadian rock-and-ice faces.

Photographs from Roskelley's phone indicate that the three climbers had reached the summit on Tuesday, 16 April at 12:44 PM. Their bodies were found on 21 April 2019. It can be deduced from a photograph taken from Icefields Parkway by a climber from Canmore that a large cornice broke off above their route in the large snow basin that is drained by the icefall route, "Life by the Drop". He reported that the resulting avalanche swept the southeast face at 1:58, 31 minutes after the three climbers had reached a steep couloir above the snow basin to descend their route. Their bodies were recovered from an avalanche cone below the icefall route "Life by the Drop". The shallow layer of snow covering the climbers was a further indicator of a cornice break as the cause of the accident.

== Competition climbing results ==
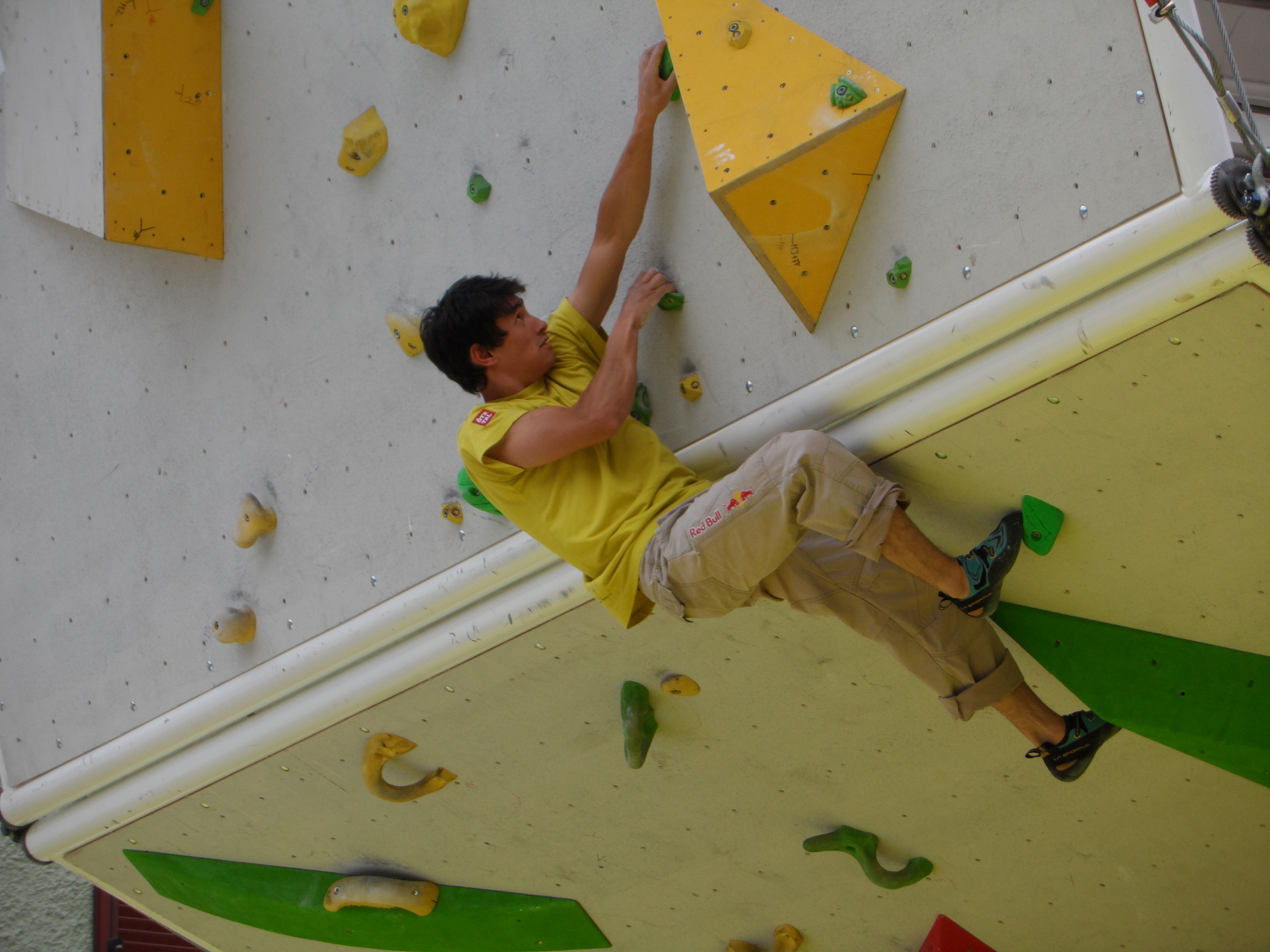
David Lama in 2014 at the 1. Free Master Solo Event in Lienz, Austria

=== IFSC World Championships ===
Discipline	2009 Xining
Lead	3

=== UIAA and IFSC European Championships ===
Discipline	2006	2007	2010
Lead	1		4
Bouldering		1	

=== Number of medals in the UIAA and IFSC Climbing World Cups ===
Overall winner in IFSC World Cup 2008.

==== Lead / Combined ====
Season	Gold	Silver	Bronze	Total
2006	3	1		4
2007	1			1
2008	1			1
2009			1	1
Total	5	1	1	7

==== Bouldering ====
Season	Gold	Silver	Bronze	Total
2006	1			1
2008	2		2	4
Total	3		2	5

=== IFSC Climbing World Youth Championships ===
Discipline	2004 Youth B	2005 Youth B	2006 Youth A
Lead	1	1	3

=== European Youth Cups ===
- European Youth Cup Winner 2004 and 2005 (youth B, lead).

== Notable ascents ==
=== Sport climbing ===
- 2000 Route Kindergarten at Osp (Slovenia). Difficulty 8a (5.13b). Being only 10 years old, Lama was the youngest person to climb a route of that grade at the time.
- 2004 Route Devers Satanique at the Gorges du Loup (France). On-Sight with difficulty 8a+ (5.13c)(10-).
- 2004 Route 7pm JP Chaud at the Gorges du Loup (France). 8c (5.14b)(10+/11-). His first ascend of that grade.
- 2006 Spain: On-Sight of several routes up to 8b+ (5.14a)(10+).
- 2007 Niederthai in the Ötztal (Austria): In a single day, he climbed the routes Gondor (8c), Mordor (8c+/9a) and In Memo Reini (8c).
- 2014 Route Atalho do Diabo (5.13) on Corcovado, Rio de Janeiro (Brazil), together with Felipe Camargo.
- 2015 Route Latent Core (5.11 A1) in Zion National Park (USA), together with Conrad Anker, who had attempted the route 25 years before.
- 2015 Route Avaatara in the Baatara Gorge (Lebanon). 9a (5.14d).

=== Alpine climbing ===
- 2009 Pamir Altai (Kyrgyzstan): First free ascent of Asan (4230m), Northwest Face, together with Nina Caprez, Giovanni Quirici and Stephan Siegrist, and with photographer Rainer Eder.
- 2010 Sarche (Italy): Lama and Jorg Verhoeven climbed the first free ascent of Brento Centro, which they then freed within a day.
- 2010 Dolomites (Italy): Lama repeated Bellavista (XI-) on Tre Cime di Lavaredo, Cima Ovest, after one day of trying.
- 2011 Cerro Torre (Argentina): Lama and Peter Ortner climbed Cerro Torre via the Compressor Route.
- 2011 Grindelwald (Switzerland): Lama climbed Paciencia (8a) in the North Face of the Eiger with Peter Ortner.
- 2011 Kashmir: Lama, Stephan Siegrist and Denis Burdet climbed a first ascent Yoniverse, on Cerro Kishtwar.
- 2011 Lofer (Austria): Lama repeated Feuertaufe (8b) by Alexander Huber, as well as Stoamandl (8b), Donnervogel (8b) and Woher Kompass (8a+).
- 2012 Patagonia (Argentina): In 24 hours, David Lama did the first free ascent of the Compressor Route (South-East Ridge) of Cerro Torre with Peter Ortner. The route was the subject of controversy after two other climbers, American Hayden Kennedy and Canadian Jason Kruk, removed many of Cesare Maestri's bolts some days before Lama's ascent. Honoured with a special mention at the Piolets d'Or 2013.
- 2012 Karakoram (Pakistan): Lama and Ortner repeated the route Eternal Flame on Trango Tower (also known as Nameless Tower; 6239m).
- 2012 Chogolisa (7668m) on the Baltoro glacier in the Karakoram (Pakistan): Lama and Ortner summited Chogolisa I and skied down the mountain's North-West Face.
- 2013 Sagwand (Austria): First winter ascent of Schiefer Riss on the Sagwand in Tyrol with Hansjörg Auer and Peter Ortner.
- 2013 The Moose's Tooth Massif (Alaska): From 12 to 14 April, Lama, together with Dani Arnold, made the first ascent of Bird of Prey (1500m, 6a, M7+, 90°, A2) up Moose's Tooth.
- 2014 Karakoram (Pakistan): First serious attempt (after a reconnaissance in 2013) at the unclimbed North-East Face of Masherbrum (K1). His partners were Peter Ortner and Hansjörg Auer. The team was forced to retreat before reaching the actual face because of persistent avalanche danger.
- 2017 Solu Khumbu (Nepal): Together with Hansjörg Auer and Alex Blümel, Lama summited Ama Dablam (6812 m) on 15 October, in order to acclimatise for the trio's second expedition to the South-East Pillar of Annapurna III (7555 m) which Lama's partners bowed out of eventually.
- 2018 Solu Khumbu (Nepal): First ascent (solo) of Lunag Ri (6907m) via the West Pillar, after three attempts (in 2015 and 2016, with Conrad Anker and solo). Honoured with a Piolet d'Or, posthumously, in July 2019.
- 2018 Together with three friends from Austria, Lama summited Cholatse (6501 m), also in the Solu Khumbu, Nepal.
- 2019 Alberta (Canada): Lama, Hansjörg Auer and Jess Roskelley climbed the mixed climbing route Andromeda Strain (M5, 700 m) on Mount Andromeda (3450 m).

=== Honor ===
The first bivouac in the Himalayas, Nepal, has been named the "David Lama Biwak" in honor of David Lama's remarkable contributions to mountaineering and his deep connection between Nepal and Austria. This shelter, located at an altitude of 5,080 meters in Upper Jaboo, Rolwaling, Nepal, stands as a tribute to Lama's legacy in both the climbing community and his role in bridging cultural and mountaineering ties between the two nations.
