= Joe Puryear =

American mountaineer (1973-2010)

- Born: August 17, 1973; Yakima Valley, Washington
- Died: October 27, 2010 (37 years old); Labuche Kang massif
- Cause of death: Fall
- Education: Toppenish High School (1991) University of Washington
- Occupations: Mountaineer, climbing ranger
- Employer: Mount Rainier National Park Climbing Ranger
- Known for: First ascents on Kang Nachugo, Takargo and Jobo Rinjang
- Notable work: Alaska Climbing
- Spouse: Michelle O'Neil (2004–his death)
- Parent(s): Gail and Shirley Puryear

Joseph Nicholi Puryear (1973 – October 27, 2010) was an American mountain climber and photographer. Puryear was known for his first ascents on unclimbed mountains in the Himalayas with climbing partner David Gottlieb, where he climbed Kang Nachugo, Takargo and Jobo Rinjang. Puryear died while climbing Labuche Kang (7367m) in Tibet.

== Early life ==
Puryear was born in 1973 to Gail and Shirley Puryear and was raised on their winery in Yakima Valley, Washington. In his youth, he took up carpentry, winemaking and farm work, and developed an interest in mountain climbing after his parents took him to Mount Adams when he was fifteen. He attended the University of Washington, where he earned a degree in mathematics.

== Mountaineering ==
Beginning in 1996, Puryear worked for four seasons as a climbing ranger at Mount Rainier National Park, where he met fellow ranger Mark Westman. Puryear and Westman climbed together in the North Cascades, Yosemite National Park, Patagonia, and most frequently, the Alaska Range. In Alaska, they made ascents of Mount McKinley's south buttress and Cassin Ridge (2000) and Mount Foraker's Infinite Spur (2001). Puryear's other achievements in the Alaska Range included the first ascent of the Black Crystal Arête route on the Kichatna Spire, the Goldfinger route on the Stump, the Harvard Route on Mount Huntington, the Mount Silverthrone's west face, and the first speed ascent of Mount Barill via the Cobra Pillar.

Using his own photographs and graphic design, and based on 30 ascents and a decade's worth of climbing in the region, Puryear wrote a guidebook to the Alaska Range, which was published by SuperTopo in 2006. Shortly afterwards, he was hired by Sherpa Adventure Gear as a photographer and the editor of their product catalog, which allowed him to finance his climbing trips after leaving his job at the National Park Service.

Puryear began climbing in the Himalayas in 2003, attracting sponsorship from companies and winning a climbing grant to support his attempts to ascend unclimbed mountains in China and Nepal. Over seven years, he made seven trips to the Himalayas. In China, he and Chad Kellogg made the first ascents of Lara Shan, Mount Daogou and the Angry Wife; in Nepal, he and David Gottlieb made the first ascents of Kang Nachugo, Takargo and Jobo Rinjang.

=== Death on Labuche Kang ===
In October 2010, Puryear and Gottlieb traveled to Tibet to climb Labuche Kang, a remote mountain in the Himalayas. While he was climbing unroped on the mountain, on October 27 Puryear broke through a cornice and fell 1,500 feet (460 m) to his death. At the time of his death, the Seattle Times referred to Puryear as "one of the country's most elite alpinists".

== Notable climbs ==
- Mt. Silverthrone, West Face, first ascent, April 1997.
- Kichatna Spire (8,985′), Alaska. The Black Crystal Arete (VI 5.10 A2, 3,000′). Chad Kellogg and Joe Puryear made the first ascent of this route July 13-14, 2005.
- Raindog Arête, Qionglai Mountains. The Angry Wife (5,020 m), first peak ascent, IV 5.10c October 2005.
- Lara Shan (5,700m), Qionglai Mountains, Sichuan, China. American Standard (65 degree ice, 1060m). Joe Puryear, Chad Kellogg and Jay Janousek made the first ascent of this peak on April 18, 2007.
- Peak 5965m in the Genyen Massif, Shaluli Shan, Sichuan Province, China. Jay Janousek, Michelle Puryear, Peter Inglis, Julie Hodson and Joe Puryear made the first documented ascent of this peak in honor of in honor of Charlie Fowler and Christine Boskoff on October 22, 2007.
- Kang Nachuago, Rolwaling Himalaya. Joe Puryear and David Gottlieb made the first ascent of this peak on October 17, 2008.
- Jobo Rinjang, Lunag massif, Khumbu Region, Nepal. First ascent by Joseph Puryear and David Gottlieb on April 22, 2009.
- Dragkar-Go /Takargo, Rolwaling valley, Nepal. Joseph Puryear and David Gottlieb made the first ascent (6771 meters) via its East Face on March 12, 2010.
