= Nangpa La shooting incident =

Shooting incident

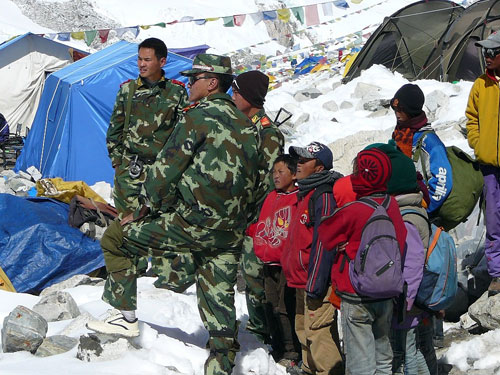
- Captured survivors and Chinese border guards at the advanced base camp in Cho Oyu
- Date: 30 September 2006
- Time: 10:30 AM
- Location: Nangpa La, Tibet, China; 28°6′27.8″N 86°35′17.5″E
- Type: Shooting of civilian by border guard
- First reporter: MountEverest.net
- Deaths: 1 (Kelsang Namtso)
- Injuries: A few (unknown number)
- Arrests: 32

The Nangpa La shooting incident occurred on 30 September 2006 when a group of unarmed Tibetan refugees attempting to flee Tibet via the Nangpa La pass were fired upon by Chinese border guards. The shooting resulted in at least one death, that of 17-year-old Buddhist nun Kelsang Namtso, as well as numerous injuries. The victims were shot from a distance by border guards as they moved slowly through chest-deep snow. Although the Chinese government initially denied the shooting, the death of one of the refugees was captured on film by a Romanian cameraman Sergiu Matei, who was nearby as part of a climbing expedition. The video caused expressions of anger from around the world.

Forty-one members of the Tibetan group reached India, while the other thirty-two living members were taken into custody by Chinese border guards. Most of the refugees were later released, although some are still unaccounted for. Some of the individuals who were released stated that they suffered torture and forced hard labor during their captivity.

== The incident ==
On 30 September 2006, a group of 75 Tibetans, accompanied by two guides, crossed the Chinese border to join the Dalai Lama in exile in Dharamsala, India. At approximately 10:30 a.m. local time, Chinese border guards of the People's Armed Police opened fire on the group. The gunfire resulted in the death of Kelsang Namtso, a 17-year-old Buddhist nun. Kunsang Namgyal, a 23-year-old man, was hit in the leg twice, then taken away by the Chinese border guard. Forty-one of the refugees, along with the guides, reached the Tibetan Refugee Transit Center in Kathmandu, Nepal. Two weeks later they arrived at their destination in Dharamsala, India. Filipino climbing doctor Ted Esguerra claimed to have seen at least three people - two women and a man - shot and killed.

Nangpa La Pass is visible from the nearby Cho Oyu mountain and its mountaineering base camps. Dozens of foreign mountaineers who were on Cho Oyu witnessed the incident. The mountaineers were able to produce numerous images and videos of the incident, including images of Chinese soldiers escorting the survivors through advanced base camp at Cho Oyu and footage of the People's Armed Police personnel shooting the refugees from great distance. Sergiu Matei, a Romanian cameraman at Pro TV, filmed the incident and broadcast live during the incident on Romanian station Pro FM. Matei later helped hide one of the Tibetan refugees for 10 hours, before the refugee was able to cross the border into Nepal. Slovenian climber Pavle Kozjek also took important photos of the incident.

=== Aftermath ===
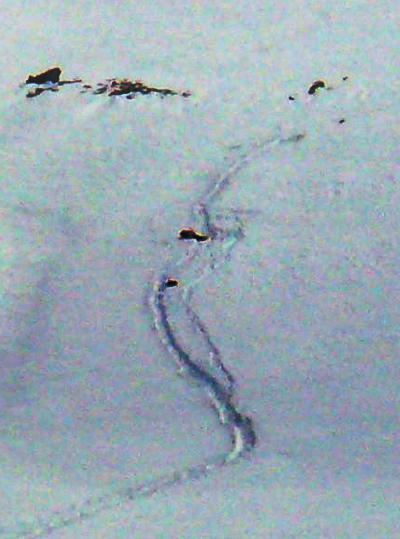
Kelsang Namtso lying in the snow after being shot and killed. Photo: Pavle Kozjek

On 12 October 2006, the official Chinese news agency, Xinhua, reported that the border guards had been "forced to defend themselves" after the refugees had thrown stones at them while trying to cross the border. It was also stated that two people suffered injures and that one later died of altitude sickness.

Matei successfully smuggled his footage of the shooting out of the country. On 14 October 2006, Matei was interviewed on the Romanian television station Pro TV. Footage of the incident was shown during the interview. The Chinese claim of self-defense was contradicted by the video footage recorded by Matei, which showed two Tibetans being shot while climbing over a mountain pass while being followed by Chinese border guards, not while attacking the guards.

The incident received global media attention concerning human rights in Tibet. On 12 October 2006, the United States Ambassador to China, Clark T. Randt, lodged a formal protest regarding China's treatment of the refugees. On 26 October 2006, the European Union Parliament passed a Joint Motion for a Resolution on Tibet, making explicit reference to the shooting.

Chinese diplomats in Kathmandu were reported to have attempted to silence witnesses to the killing, including both western climbers and sherpas.

On 30 November 2006 at the meeting of the UN Human Rights Council in Geneva, Switzerland, 16 non-governmental organizations issued a joint statement questioning the UN High Commissioner for Human Rights on the steps taken concerning the 30 September killing of a Tibetan in the Nangpa Pass. However, the High Commissioner did not respond to questions posed about the Nangpa Pass killing.

== Missing persons ==
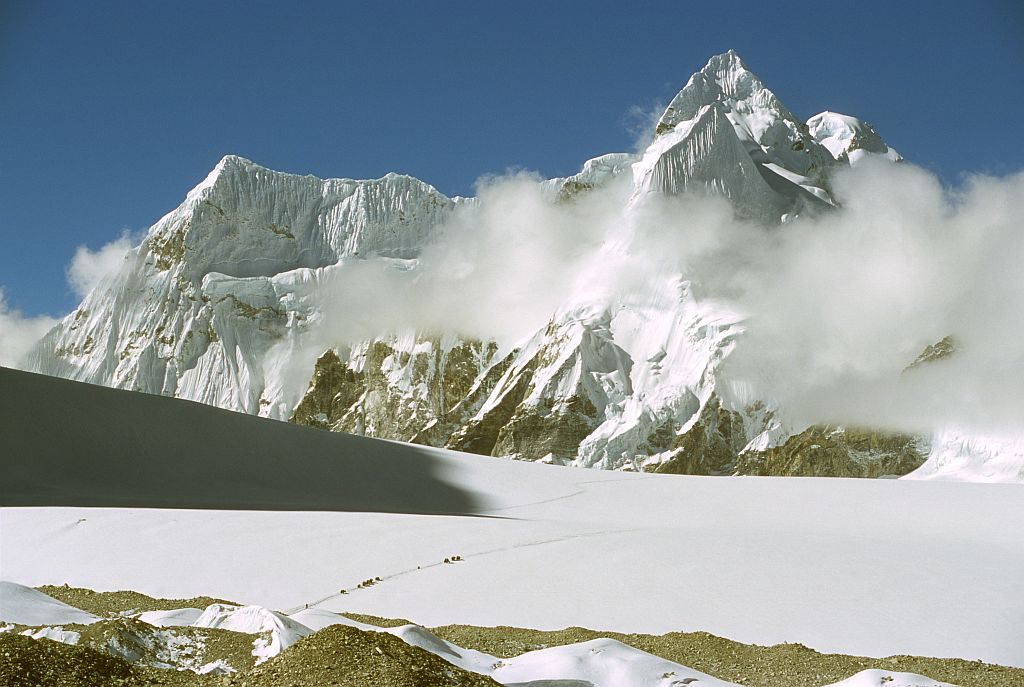
Tibetan refugees crossing the Nangpa La pass between Tibet and Nepal viewed from Cho Oyu basecamp in 2000. In the background Lunag Ri.

Of the 75 refugees who attempted to cross the border on 30 September 2006, 17 people remain unaccounted for. At least one individual captured by the Chinese government was released, but said that he had been tortured and subjected to mandatory hard labor. The individuals who were not accounted for ranged in age from 7 to 35 years old. Some of the children who are unaccounted for may have been detained for a short time and then released.

== Portrayal in the arts ==
A documentary called Tibet: Murder in the Snow, based on this incident, was released in 2008 by the Australian production company 360 Degree Films, working in collaboration with the BBC.

English journalist Jonathan Green wrote a book about the shootings, titled Murder in the High Himalayas, which was released in 2010. The book is an expansion of Green's earlier article in Men's Journal called "Murder at 19,000 Feet". Canadian technical death metal band Gorguts' song "Absconders" on their album Colored Sands was based on Green's book, using direct quotes from the book with Green's permission.

== See also ==
- Human rights in Tibet
- Tibetan Government in Exile
- Nangpa La
- Pavle Kozjek, Slovenian mountaineer and photographer of the Nangpa La killing

== Sources ==
Further reading

- Jonathan Green. Murder in the High Himalaya. PublicAffairs, 2010. ISBN 978-1-58648-714-0 - a book-length account of the incident.
