= Chad Kellogg =

American mountaineer (1971–2014)

Chad Kellogg (September 22, 1971 – February 14, 2014) was an American mountain climber, best known for his numerous speed climbing records and first ascents. He died by a falling rock after climbing Fitz Roy successfully and while descending.

== Early life ==
Kellogg was born in Omak, Washington in 1971. His parents, Ric and Peggy Kellogg, were missionaries, and as a result his family moved to Kenya for seven years before returning to the United States to settle in Seattle. He enrolled at the University of Washington in 1989 when he was 17 and graduated with a degree in economics. He trained with the U.S. national luge team for seven years in Lake Placid, New York, but gave up the sport after failing to qualify for the 1994 Winter Olympics.

== Mountaineering ==
Kellogg began climbing in 1984 in the North Cascades but it was not until he left the national luge team that he began to pursue mountaineering as a career. He worked as a climbing ranger in Mount Rainier National Park in 1997–1998 and later ran a Seattle-based construction business to support his climbs. He became well known in the climbing community in 1998 as he began to break records for speed ascents.

=== Speed climbing ===
In 1998 Kellogg became the first person to climb and descend Mount Rainier in under five hours. He repeated the feat in 2004 when he ran from Paradise, Washington to the summit and back in 4 hours, 59 minutes. His record for the fastest climb has since been surpassed. Kellogg entered the 2003 Khan Tengri speed climbing competition in Kazakhstan, a race to climb the mountain, and won. He once held the record for the fastest ascent and descent on Denali's West Buttress route, making the round trip to the summit and back in 23 hours, 55 minutes; he was the first known person to ascend and descend in less than 24 hours. Kellogg made three attempts to break speed record on Mount Everest in 2010, 2011 and 2013, but never succeeded.

=== First ascents ===
Throughout his career, Kellogg claimed a number of first ascents. These included the Black Crystal Arete route on Kichatna Spire in Alaska (2005; with Joe Puryear), the southwest ridge of Mount Siguniang (2008; with Dylan Johnson), the Medicine Buddha route on Aconcagua in Argentina (2009), and Pangbuk Ri in Nepal (2011). In 2012, Kellogg traveled to Nepal with David Gottlieb to attempt the first ascent of Lunag Ri; they abandoned the attempt when Gottlieb fell sick, but in 2014 Kellogg won a Mugs Stump Award grant to return to the mountain for another attempt.

=== Death on Fitz Roy ===
Kellogg and his climbing partner Jens Holsten traveled to Patagonia, Argentina in 2014 on an expedition to climb Fitz Roy. Both Kellogg and Holsten reached the summit on the afternoon of February 14, but while they were descending that night, Kellogg was hit by a falling rock and died instantly. His body was eventually recovered in 2017.

== Personal life ==
Kellogg met Lara-Karena Bitenieks, another climber, in 1994 while they were working at REI in Seattle. They began dating in 1999 and were married from 2000 until she died in 2007 while descending Mount Wake in Denali National Park, Alaska. A month after his wife's death, Kellogg was diagnosed with colorectal cancer, which later went into remission. Before his death in 2014, Kellogg was in a relationship with Mandy Kraus. He was a Buddhist.
