= Qionglai =

Qionglai could refer to the following locations in Sichuan Province, China:

- Qionglai City (邛崃市), county-level city under the administration of Chengdu
- Qionglai Mountains (邛崃山), mountain range
