= Nangpa La =

Mountain pass in China and Nepal

Nangpa La (Khumbu La)
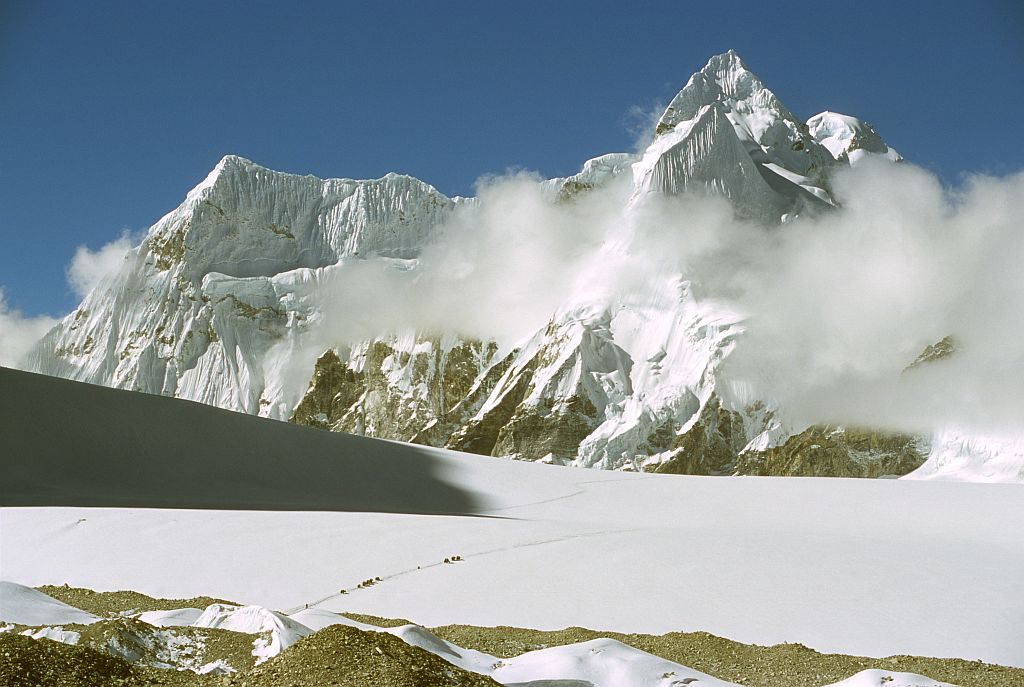
- Traveling caravan crossing the Nangpa La. The Lunag Ri is in the background.

- Location within Nepal Location within Tibet
- Elevation: 5,716 m (18,753 ft)

Location
- Location: Nepal (Khumjung) – China (Tibet)
- Range: Himalayas
- Coordinates: 28°06′28″N 86°35′17″E

Nangpa La
- Traditional Chinese: 囊帕拉山口
- Simplified Chinese: 囊帕拉山口
Transcriptions

Nangpa La (Chinese: 囊帕拉山口 also known as Chinese: 朗喀巴山口) (el. 5,806 m or 19,050 ft) is a high mountain pass crossing the Himalayas and the Nepal-Tibet Autonomous Region border a few kilometres west of Cho Oyu and some 30 km (20 mi) northwest of Mount Everest. A foot-trail over Nangpa La is the traditional trade and pilgrimage route connecting Tibetans and Sherpas of Khumbu and its historical name is Khumbu La. This was the location of the 2006 Nangpa La shootings.

== Background ==
From this pass the Mahalangur section of the Himalaya extend east past Cho Oyu, Gyachung Kang, Everest, Ama Dablam and Makalu to the gorge of the Arun River. The Rolwaling Himalayas including Gauri Sankar and Melungtse rise west and southwest of the pass.

In 1951 Dane Klaus Becker-Larsen and two Sherpas attempted the North Col, but turned back because of rockfall. He had minimal equipment and no mountaineering experience.

The 1952 British Cho Oyu expedition led by Eric Shipton established a base at Lunak below the Nangpa La Pass. Shipton wanted to avoid any clashes with Chinese troops, but eventually agreed to a camp just short of the Nangpa La, and to send a party to attempt the first crossing of the Nup La pass which could be quickly withdrawn if Chinese troops were sighted. But Ed Hillary, George Lowe and three Sherpas crossed the Nup La col and then went "deep into Chinese territory" like "a couple of naughty schoolboys".

In 2006, Chinese border guards of the People's Armed Police (PAP) opened fire on 75 unarmed Tibetan refugees as they traversed waist-deep snow in the Nangpa La shooting incident, killing 17-year-old Buddhist nun Kelsang Namtso and leading to the disappearance of a further 17 refugees. Despite an attempted Chinese coverup, several foreign climbers at base camps on Cho Oyu managed to video and photograph the situation as it unfolded and the events drew widespread international condemnation when shown to the outside world.

== Trekking in Nangpa La Pass ==
Although the Nangpa La Pass trek is not a well-known route in the Everest region, it is one of the most scenic. The journey passes through Sherpa villages and remote Himalayan landscapes before reaching the Nangpa La Pass, offering an unusual trekking experience.

== See also ==
- Nangpa La shooting incident
- Pavle Kozjek
