= Jonathan Green (journalist) =

English author and investigative journalist

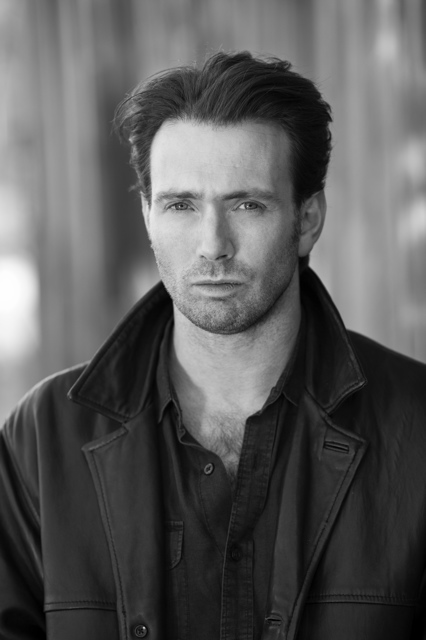
Jonathan Green

Jonathan Green is an English author and investigative journalist specialising in narrative non-fiction. He is the author of two books Murder in the High Himalaya (2010) and Sex Money Murder (2018).

== Life and career ==
Green grew up on the family pig farm at Glemsford, near Sudbury, Suffolk; when he was 14 the family sold the farm settling in Bury St Edmunds. He attended boarding school at St Joseph's College, Ipswich, until age 18, but was unhappy with his education there and vowed to become a journalist after he graduated. Years later he would return to school and in 2015 obtained a Master of Fine Arts in Creative Nonfiction from Goucher College.

Green's writing career began at age 18, when he worked for the Suffolk Free Press as an investigative journalist. He did freelance work for a few years, then attended the London College of Printing. He then got a break as an investigative feature writer at The Big Issue in London. Since then, Green has written for The New York Times, Virginia Quarterly Review, Garden and Gun, Town and Country, the Sunday Times Magazine, Men's Journal, Fast Company, Esquire, GQ, The Financial Times, Men's Health, and The Mail on Sunday, among others. He has reported in Sudan, Brazil, Kazakhstan, South Africa, China, Colombia, Ukraine, Borneo and the ice fields of Alaska among many other places.

Green's first book, Murder in the High Himalaya: Loyalty, Tragedy, and Escape from Tibet (2010) is about the Nangpa La shootings. It is based on his article in Men's Journal called "Murder at 19,000 Feet". Murder in the High Himalaya won the Banff Mountain Book Competition in the Mountain and Wilderness Category (2011). It also won the American Society of Journalists and Authors "Outstanding Non Fiction Book of the Year" (2011). The book is endorsed by the Dalai Lama and actor Richard Gere.

Green's second book, Sex Money Murder: A Story of Crack, Blood and Betrayal (2018) chronicles the story of the infamous Bronx gang Sex Money Murder through inside access to gangsters and the federal agents, police officers and prosecutors who took them down. Author Jill Leovy reviewing in The New York Times Book Review said that the book is "exceptionally authentic". As of March 2019, a TV show based on the book was in development by rapper and producer 50 Cent along with producer Nicole Rocklin.

== Awards ==
- 2011 American Society of Journalists and Authors, Outstanding Non-Fiction Book Award, Murder in the High Himalaya
- 2011 Banff Mountain Book Competition, Mountain and Wilderness Literature category, Murder in the High Himalaya
