= Kang Nachugo =

Mountain in Nepal

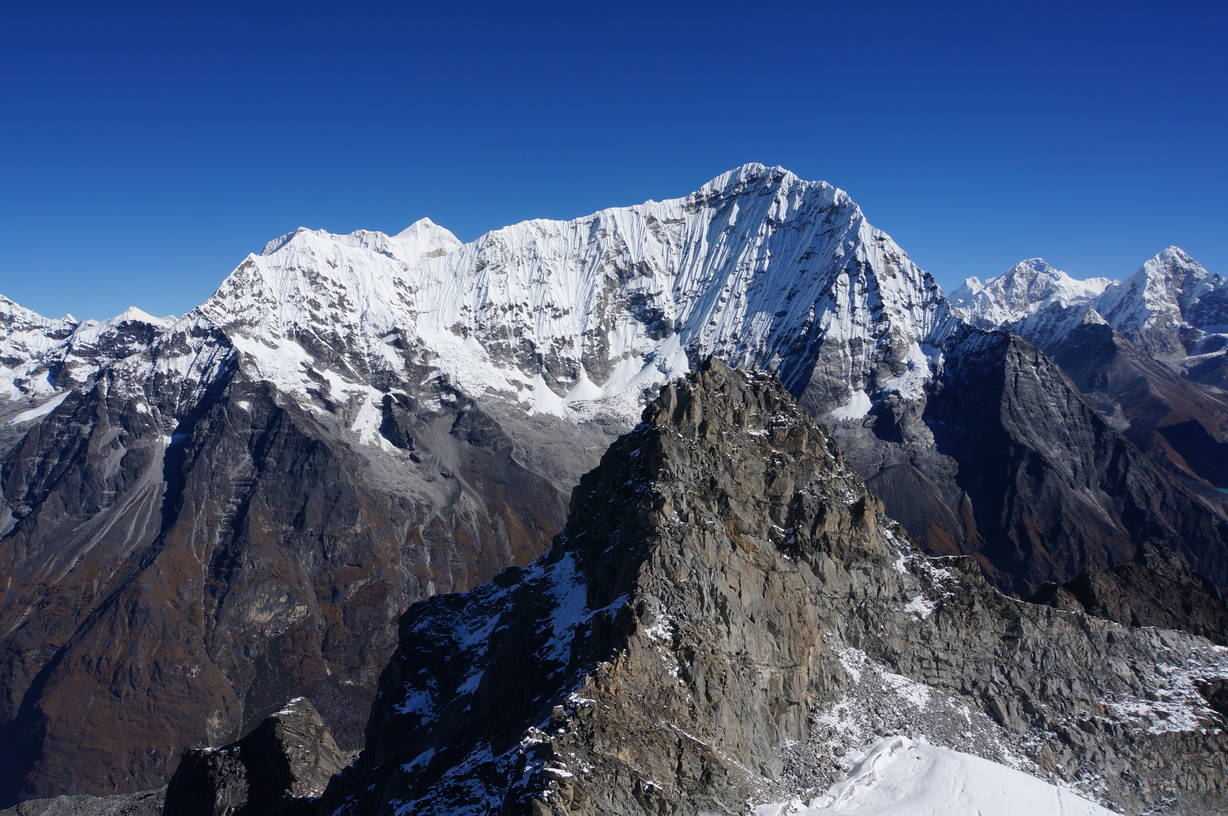
- Kang Nachugo in 2016

Highest point
- Elevation: 6,735 m (22,096 ft)
- Prominence: 935 m (3,068 ft)
- Coordinates: 27°54′18″N 86°26′33″E

Geography
- Location within Bagmati Province Location within Nepal
- Location: Gaurishankar
- Country: Nepal
- Province: Bagmati
- District: Dolakha

Kang Nachugo is a mountain located in Gaurishankar, Dolakha District, Nepal at an elevation of 6,735 metres (22,096 ft) above sea level. It was first climbed in 2008 by Joe Puryear, and David Gottlieb.
