= Sichuan Giant Panda Sanctuaries =

UNESCO World Heritage Site
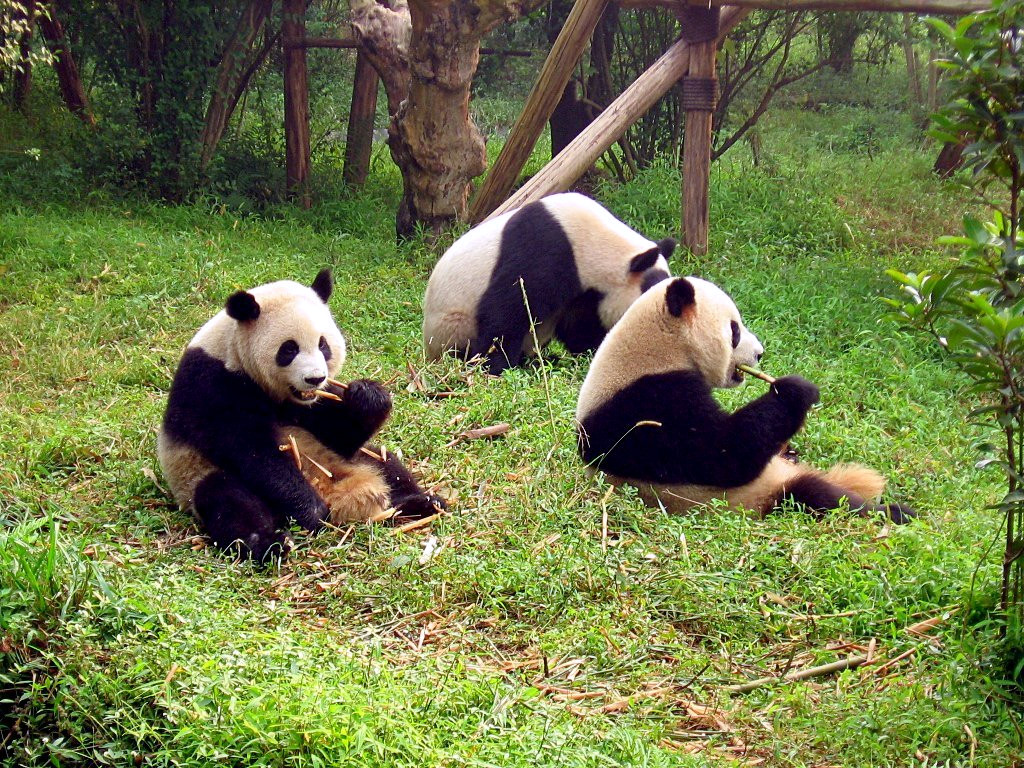

- Location within Sichuan Location within China
- Official name: Sichuan Giant Panda Sanctuaries - Wolong, Mt Siguniang and Jiajin Mountains
- Location: Sichuan, People's Republic of China
- Criteria: Natural: (x)
- Reference: 1213
- Inscription: 2006 (30th Session)
- Area: 924,500 ha (3,570 sq mi)
- Buffer zone: 527,100 ha (2,035 sq mi)
- Coordinates: 30°50′N 103°0′E

The Sichuan Giant Panda Sanctuaries (simplified Chinese: 四川大熊猫栖息地; traditional Chinese: 四川大熊貓棲息地; pinyin: Sìchuān Dàxióngmāo Qīxīdì) located in southwest Sichuan province of China, is the home to more than 30% of the world's giant pandas and is among the most important sites for the captive breeding of these pandas. It covers 9245 km^{2} with seven nature reserves and nine scenic parks in the Qionglai and Jiajin Mountains. Along with the giant panda, the sanctuary is a refuge to other endangered species such as the red panda, the snow leopard, and the clouded leopard. Outside of the tropical rainforests, it is among the botanically richest sites of the world, and is home to between 5,000 and 6,000 species of flora. It has been noted that the region is similar to the paleo-tropic forests of the Paleogene Periods. Because of its biodiversity and conservation of giant pandas, these sanctuaries were listed as UNESCO World Heritage Sites in 2006.

== Composition ==
The Sichuan Giant Panda Sanctuaries consist of eight nature reserves and nine scenic parks.

- Eight Nature Reserves
  - Wolong Nature Reserve (Chinese: 卧龙自然保护区)
  - Fengtongzhai Nature Reserve (Chinese: 蜂桶寨自然保护区)
  - Mount Siguniang Nature Reserve (Chinese: 四姑娘山自然保护区)
  - Laba River Nature Reserve (Chinese: 喇叭河自然保护区)
  - Anzihe Nature Reserve (Chinese: 鞍子河自然保护区)
  - Heishui River Nature Reserve (Chinese: 黑水河自然保护区)
  - Jintang-Kongyu Nature Reserve (Chinese: 金汤—孔玉自然保护区)
  - Caopo Nature Reserve (Chinese: 草坡自然保护区)
- Nine Scenic Parks
  - Mt. Qingcheng-Dujiangyan Scenic Park (Chinese: 青城山—都江堰风景名胜区)
  - Mt. Tiantai Scenic Park (Chinese: 天台山风景名胜区)
  - Mt. Siguniang Scenic Park (Chinese: 四姑娘山风景名胜区)
  - Xiling Snow Mountain Scenic Park (Chinese: 西岭雪山风景名胜区)
  - Mt. Jiguan-Jiulonggou Scenic Park (Chinese: 鸡冠山—九龙沟风景名胜区)
  - Mt. Jiajin Scenic Park (Chinese: 夹金山风景名胜区)
  - Miyaluo Scenic Park (Chinese: 米亚罗风景名胜区)
  - Mt. Lingzhen-Mt. Daxue Scenic Park (Chinese: 灵鹫山—大雪峰风景名胜区)
  - Mt. Erlang Scenic Park (Chinese: 二郎山风景名胜区)

== Gallery ==
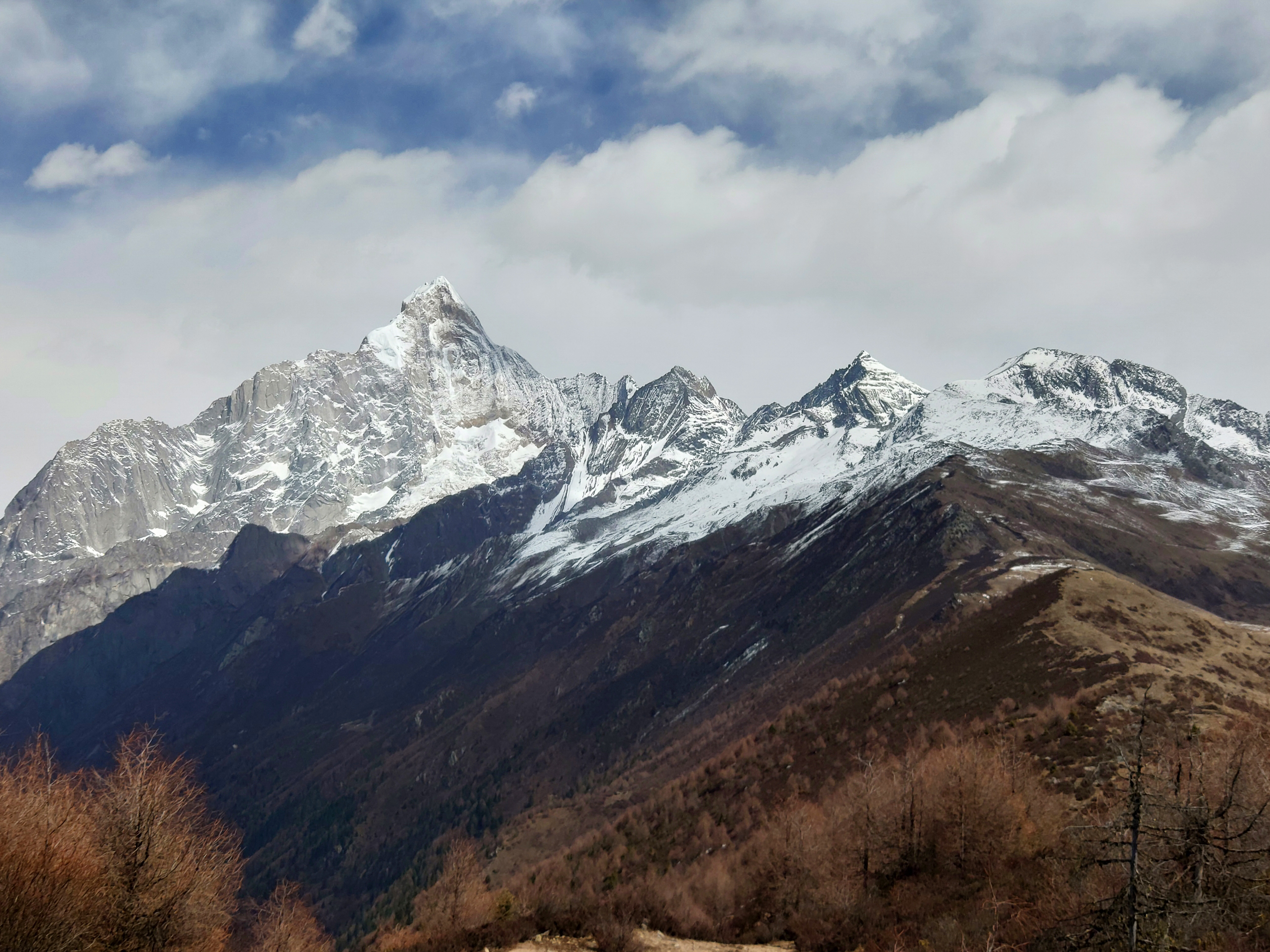
Mt. Siguniang

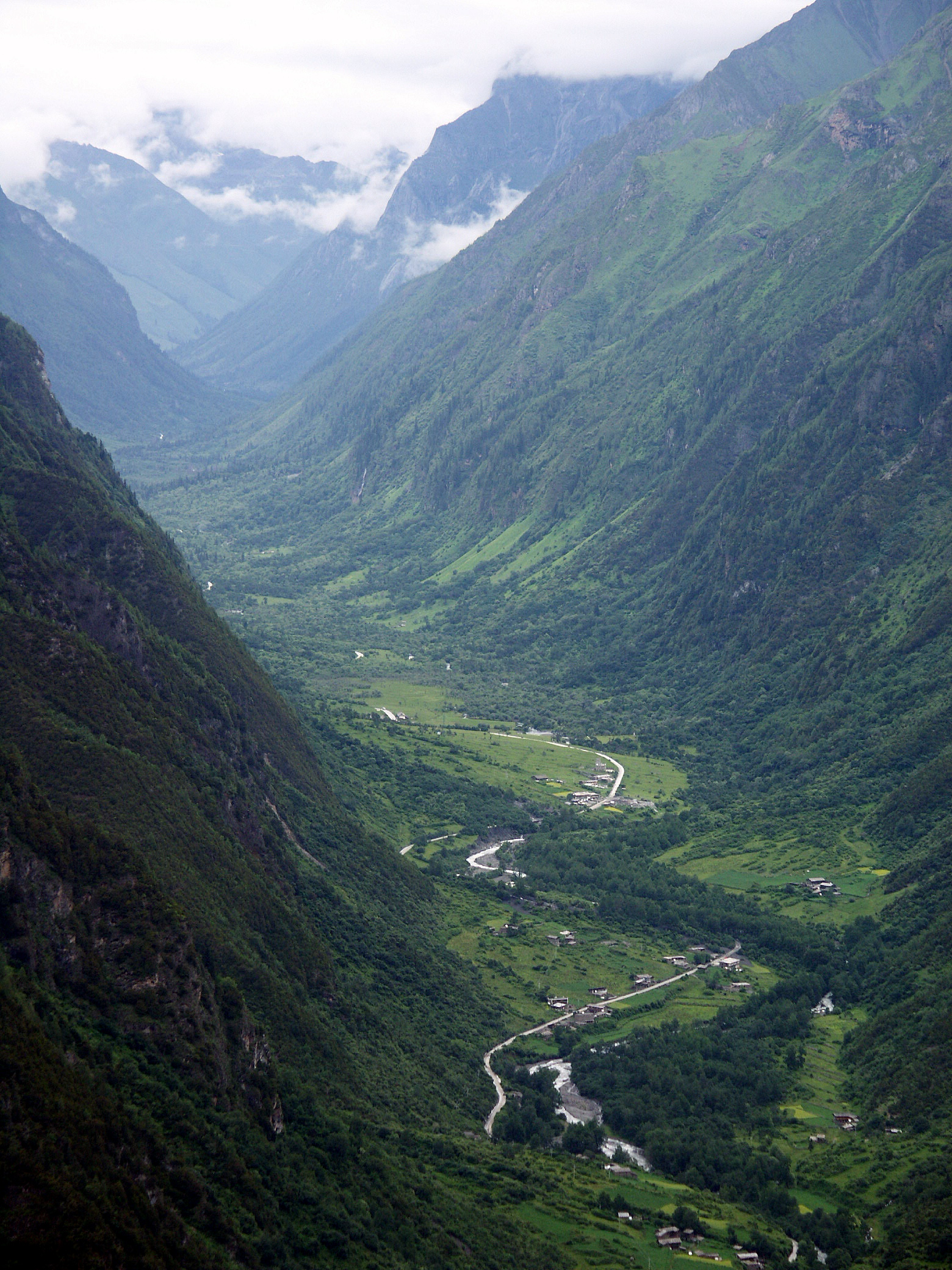
Mt. Siguniang (Shuangqiao Valley)

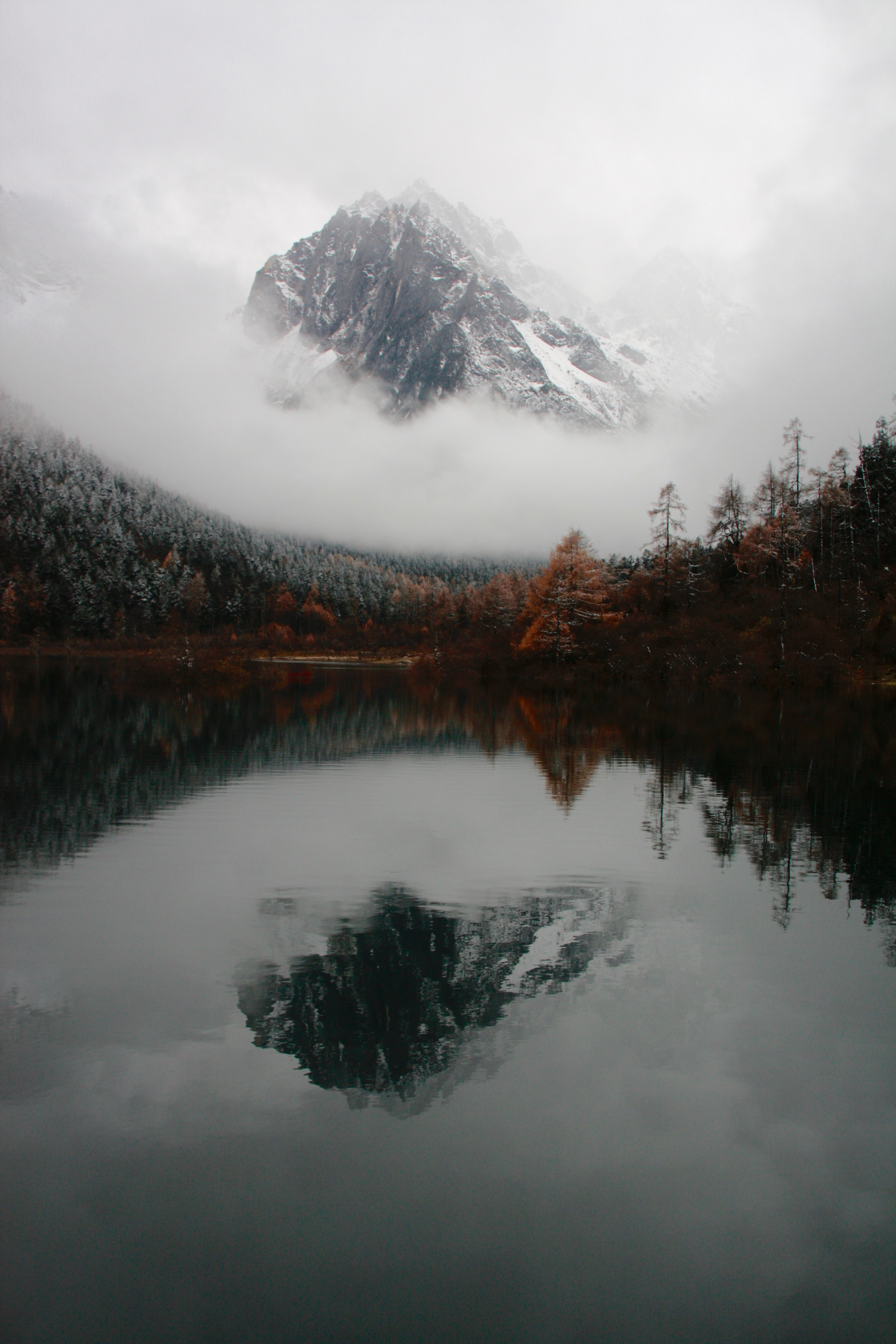
Miyaluo (Bipeng Valley)

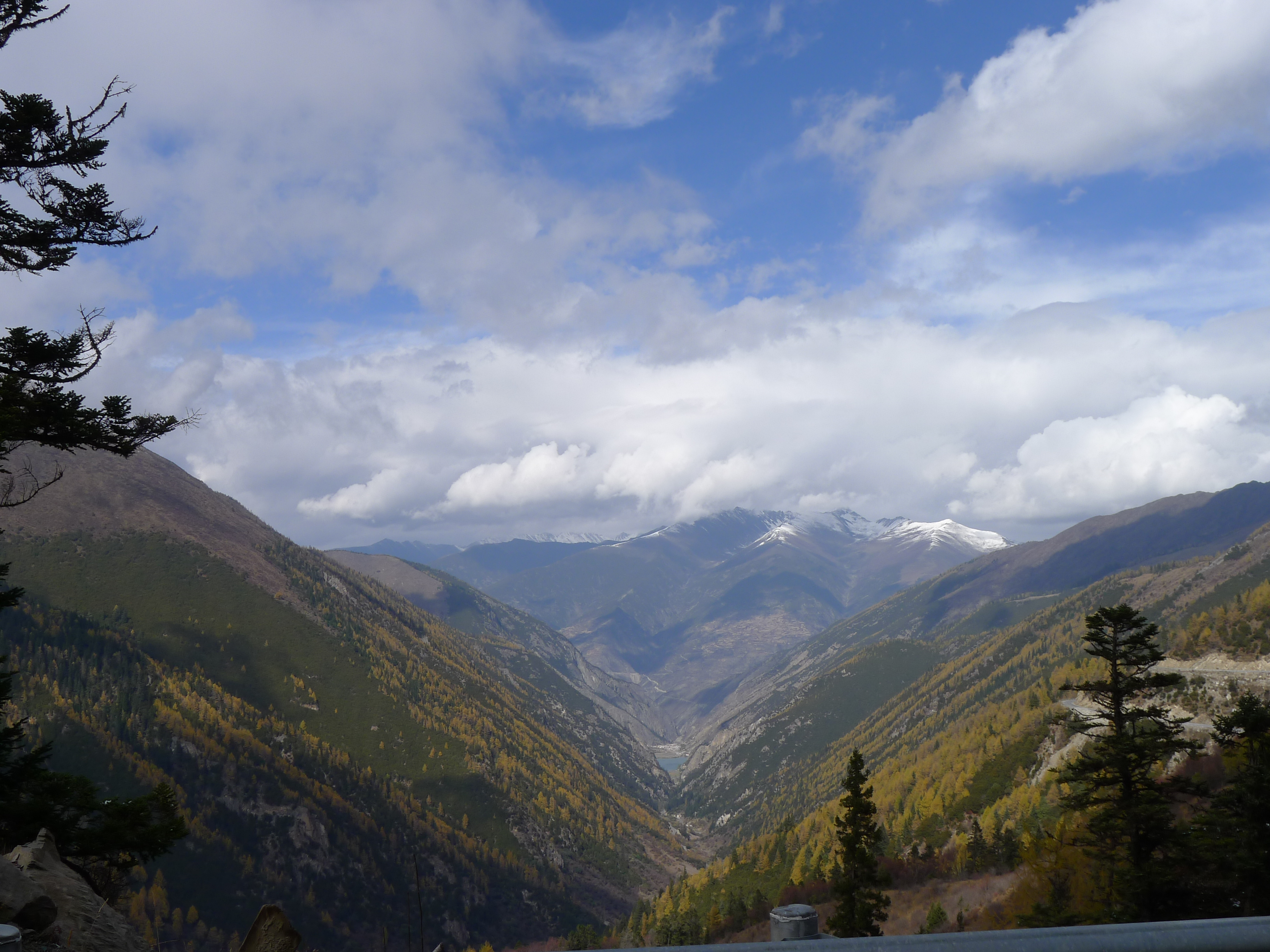
Mt. Jiajin

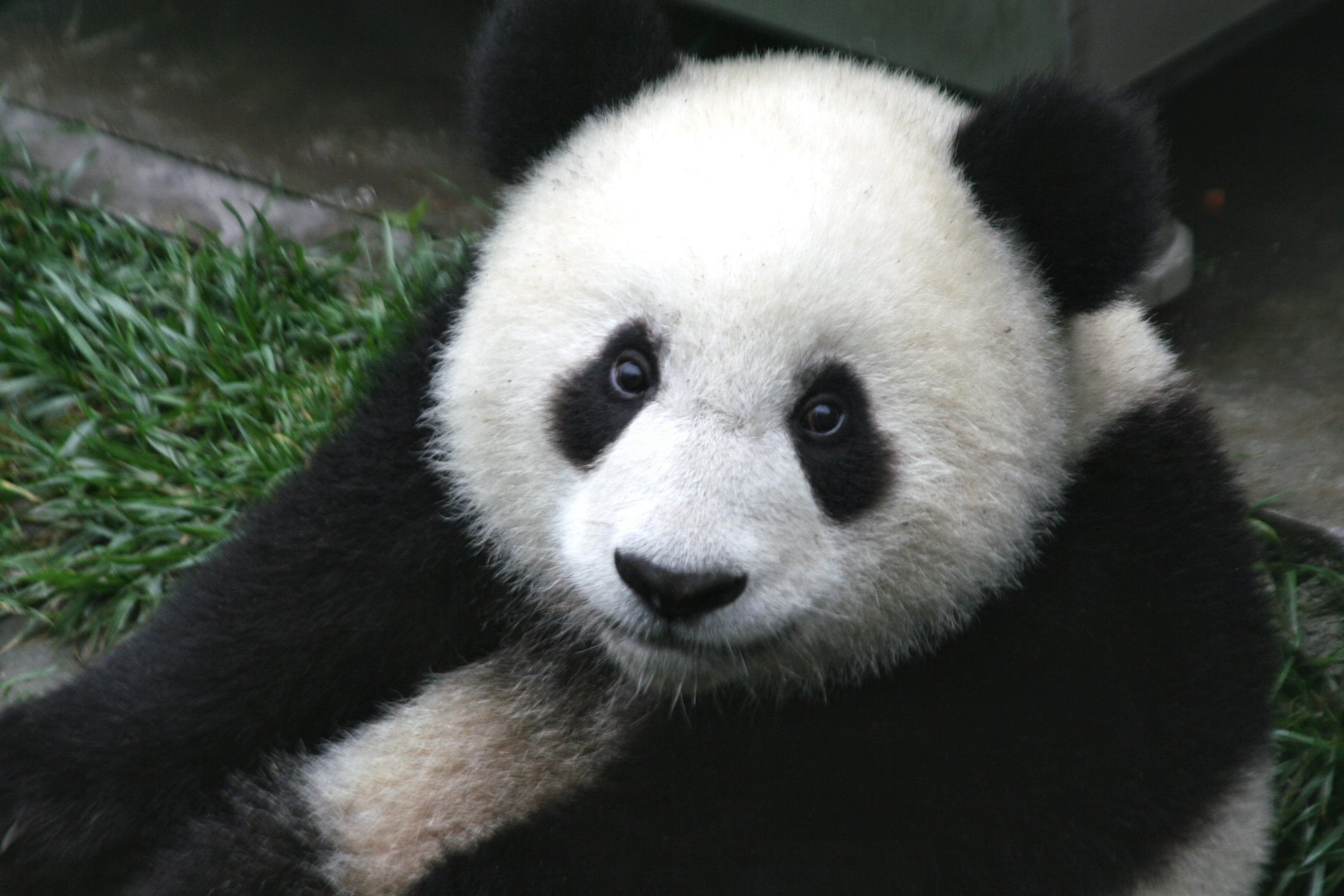
Panda Cub in Wolong

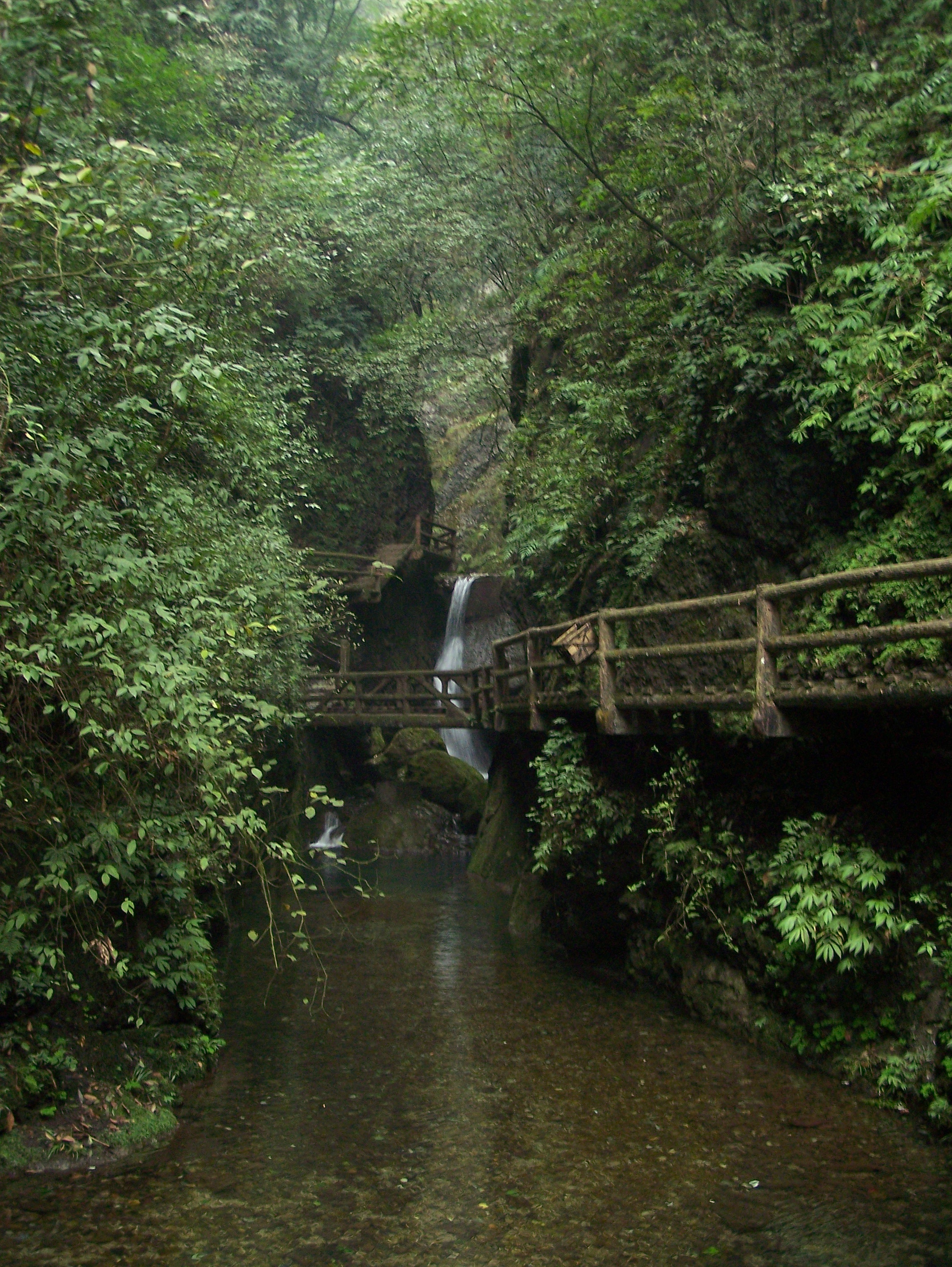
Mt. Qingcheng
