= Cesare Maestri =

Italian mountain climber (1929–2021)

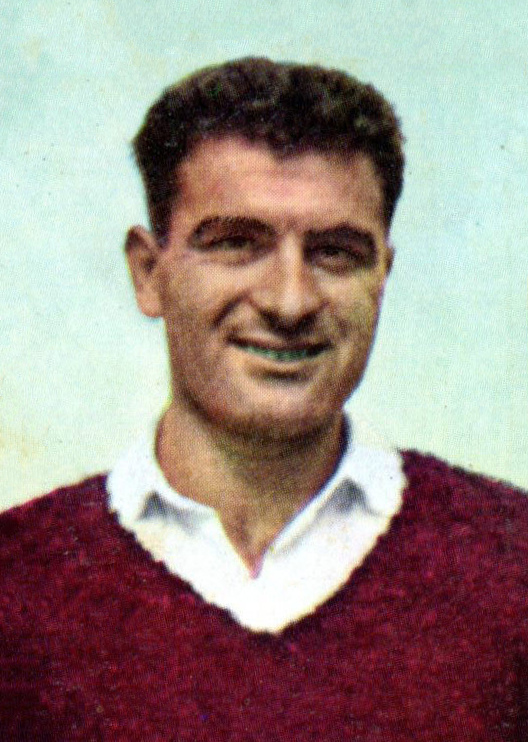
- Maestri in 1969

Personal information
- Nationality: Italian
- Born: 2 October 1929 Trento, Trentino, Italy
- Died: 19 January 2021 (aged 91)

Climbing career
- Type of climber: Mountaineer
- Known for: "Spider of the Dolomites"

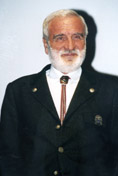
Maestri in 2006

Cesare Maestri (2 October 1929 – 19 January 2021) was an Italian mountaineer and writer.

He was born in Trento in the Italian province of Trentino. He began climbing in the Dolomites, where he repeated many famous routes, often climbing them solo and free, and put up many new routes of the hardest difficulty, for which he was nicknamed the "Spider of the Dolomites".

== Early life ==
Maestri's father was from the Trento area; his mother was from the Ferrara area in the plains of northern Italy. His mother died in 1936, when Maestri was seven years old and his father was working as a civil servant whose duties involved handling financial payments to Austrians in Trentino who had fought for the Italians during WW1. During WW2 he and his father moved to the Bologna region because his father had become a target when the German army occupied the Trentino region in September 1943. At that time Bologna was a centre of communist influence and Maestri joined the communist party, he retained strong political views into his later life. He returned to Trentino about a year after he had left and joined the Italian partisans operating there.

== Post war ==
After the war Maestri spent a few months working in bomb disposal before moving to Rome in 1946 where he worked and studied hoping to attend college to study Art and the History of Art but after a couple of years he returned once more to Trento. Very soon after his return he started climbing in the Dolomites and within a few years he had "established his reputation in Europe as a brilliant free climber with a number of visionary solos, climbing both up and down grade VIs when the mood moved him". Notable solos include the Solleder route on the Civetta, the Solda-Conforto Route on the Marmolada, and the southwest ridge of the Matterhorn in winter. He became an alpine guide in 1952.

He later wrote several books and opened a sports equipment shop in the resort town of Madonna di Campiglio where he lived.

== Cerro Torre ==
Cesarino Fava, who had moved to live in Argentina after WW2, wrote to Maestri in 1953 suggesting that he should visit South America to attempt the unclimbed Cerro Torre. It wasn't until December 1957 that Maestri first reached the continent and on that occasion, he was a member of a CAI expedition led by Bruno Detassis.

=== 1959 expedition ===
In 1959, Maestri returned to Patagonia to attempt the north-east ridge of the still unclimbed Cerro Torre. The party consisted of Maestri, Cesarino Fava and the Austrian guide Toni Egger. Egger and Maestri had first met at the Lavaredohütte in the Tre Cima in 1956, the first time that they climbed together was on Cerro Torre.

The three ascended a steep corner below the Col of Conquest (between Cerro Torre and Torre Egger), Fava then turned back and Maestri and Egger headed for the summit. Six days later Fava found Maestri lying face down and almost buried in the snow. They returned to base camp, with Maestri claiming that he and Egger had reached the summit, but Egger had been swept to his death by an avalanche as they were descending.

Skepticism toward Maestri's 1959 account mounted as it became evident how difficult the alleged route is even with the advances in technique made through the first decade of the next century. Among the doubters are many well-known alpinists including Carlo Mauri, who had failed to climb the mountain in 1958 and in 1970, Reinhold Messner, and Ermanno Salvaterra, who had defended Maestri until successfully completing roughly the same route himself in 2005. The criticism was also taken up by British climber and writer Ken Wilson, editor of Mountain magazine. Besides citing the impossibility of the climb given the ice-climbing tools available in those years, the critics point out that Maestri's description of his route is detailed and accurate up to a glacier substantially lower than where Cesarino Fava claimed to have turned back, but vague and impossible to trace on the mountain thereafter; and that bolts, pitons, fixed ropes and other equipment used by the 1959 expedition is plentiful up to that glacier, but absent thereafter. Nevertheless, Maestri consistently maintained his version of events, as did Fava, who died in April 2008.

In 2015, Rolando Garibotti and Kelly Cordes showed the photo Maestri claimed was taken on the east wall of Cerro Torre, was taken on Perfil de Indio.

=== Compressor Route ===
In 1970, Maestri returned to Cerro Torre and climbed a new route on the southeast side of the mountain. Over two seasons, he used a petrol-driven air compressor, weighing approximately 135 kg (300 pounds) to drill 400 bolts into the rock, and lay thousands of metres of fixed ropes. The resulting route became known as the Compressor Route. Its namesake can still be found hanging on the face of Cerro Torre 100m below the summit. Maestri stopped short of the summit's "ice mushroom", which almost always covers the highest point.

The Compressor Route was controversial. Hand bolting of short sections of unprotectable rock was an accepted practice. The use of a mechanical compressor, large numbers of bolts, and their use near naturally protectable features, was considered excessive. Mountain Magazine ran a story titled "Cerro Torre: A Mountain Desecrated", and the bolting of Cerro Torre prompted Messner to write the notable essay, "The Murder of the Impossible"

The first undisputed ascent was made in 1974, by Casimiro Ferrari, Daniele Chiappa, Mario Conti, and Pino Negri, who also ascended the "ice mushroom". In 1991, Werner Herzog made the film Scream of Stone, a dramatised version of the various ascents of Cerro Torre made by Cesare Maestri.

On 16 January 2012, Hayden Kennedy and Jason Kruk made the first "fair means" ascent of the southeast ridge of Cerro Torre. On their descent, they chopped about 120 bolts from the Compressor Route, with the effect of restoring most of the original challenge. In a statement, Kennedy and Kruk, who climbed the route in 13 hours, said they decided to remove the Maestri line after arriving at the summit having only used five bolts from the original line. On 21 January 2012, Austrian climbers David Lama and Peter Ortner made the first free ascent of the southeast ridge, proving the face was climbable without the use of bolts. Lama described his ascent as the greatest adventure of his life.

== Books by Maestri ==
- Maestri, Cesare (1961). Arrampicare è il mio mestiere. Garzanti.
- Maestri, Cesare (1965). A scuola di roccia con Cesare Maestri. Cappelli.
- Maestri, Cesare; Maestri, Fernanda (1972). Duemila metri della nostra vita. Garzanti.
