= Mount Siguniang =

Mountain in Western China

- རི་བོ་སྐུ་བླ་
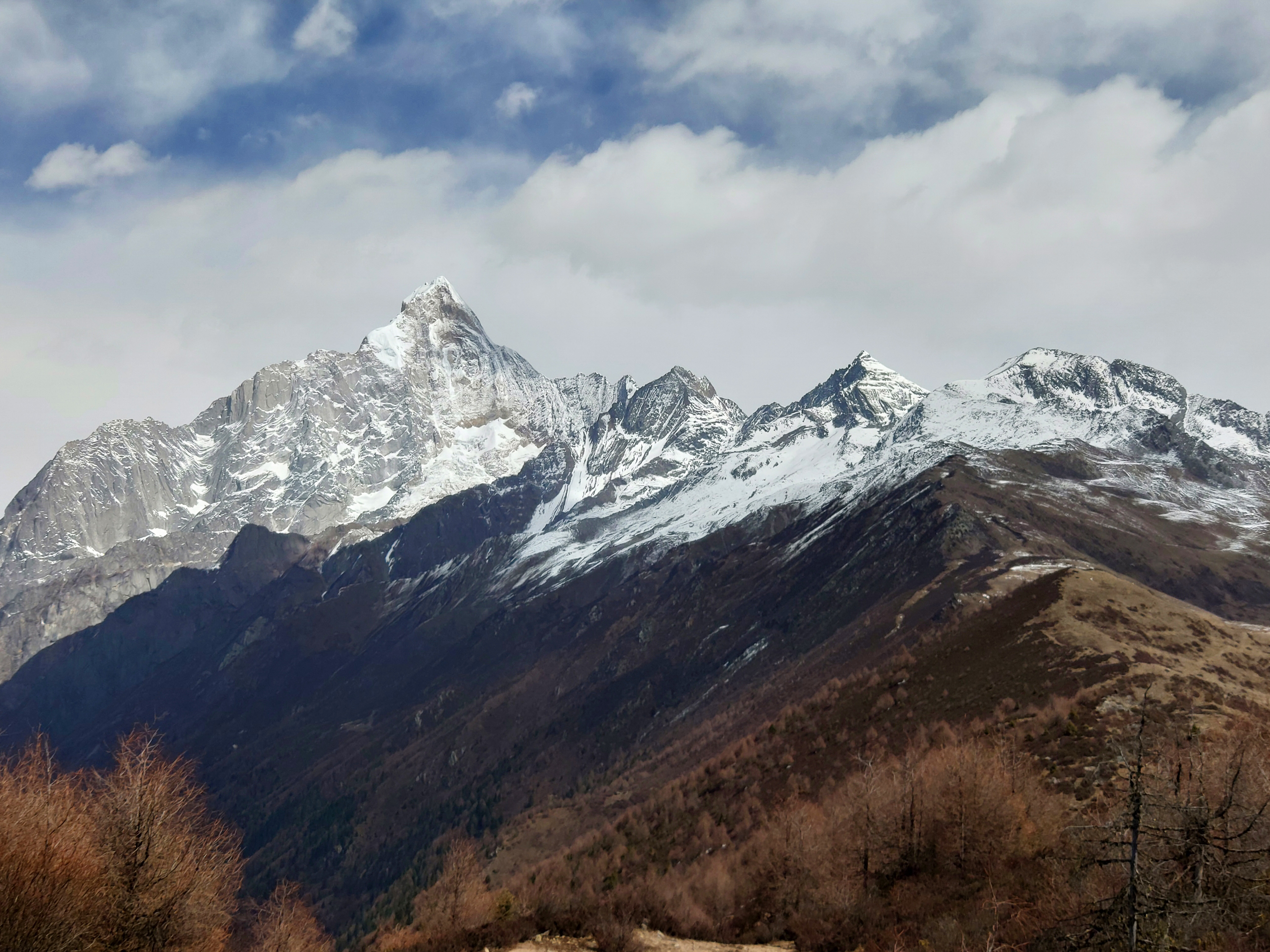
- From left to right: Yaomei Feng, Sanguniang Feng, Erguniang Feng and Daguniang Feng.

Highest point
- Elevation: 6,250 m (20,510 ft)
- Prominence: 2,571 m (8,435 ft)
- Listing: Ultra
- Coordinates: 31°06′24″N 102°54′06″E

Geography
- Location within Sichuan
- Location: Ngawa Prefecture, Sichuan, China
- Parent range: Qionglai Mountains

Climbing
- First ascent: 1981
- Easiest route: snow/ice/glacier climb

Mount Siguniang (Chinese: 四姑娘山; pinyin: Sìgūniang Shān; lit. 'Mountain of the Four Maidens'), or Mount Skubla (Tibetan: རི་བོ་སྐུ་བླ་, Wylie: ri bo sku bla, lit. 'Mountain of the tutelary deity') is the highest mountain of Qionglai Mountains in Western China. It is located in the bordering area of Siguniangshan Town, Xiaojin County and Wenchuan County in Ngawa Tibetan and Qiang Autonomous Prefecture, Sichuan Province.

Mount Siguniang is renowned for its beauty. Mount Siguniang National Park was identified as a UNESCO Heritage Site as part of Sichuan Giant Panda Sanctuaries in 2006. The park comprises Mount Siguniang and the surrounding three valleys, namely Changping Valley (长坪沟), Haizi Valley (海子沟) and Shuangqiao Valley (双桥沟), covering an area of 2,000sq km.

== Peaks ==
=== Names ===
The Mandarin name of the mountain range, Siguniang Shan (四姑娘山, pinyin: sì gū niang, lit. 'four maidens mountain' ), is believed by some to be derived from a Chinese phonological adaptation of the local Gyalron/Tibetan name for the mountain, Mount Sgu La/Mount Sku Bla, which translates as "tutelary deity", perhaps into 斯古拉 (pinyin: sī gǔ lā), which was later reinterpreted as 四姑娘 (pinyin: sì gū niang) based on phonological similarity.

The "four mountains" refer to four adjacent peaks in the Siguniang range. With 峰, (pinyin: fēng) meaning 'peak', and 姑娘 (pinyin: gū niang) meaning 'maiden', 'young lady' or 'sister', the four "sister peaks" are named in Mandarin Chinese according to the reverse order of elevation: Dàgūniang Fēng（大姑娘峰 'Peak of the Big Sister') at 5,025 m (16,486 ft), Èrgūniang Fēng（二姑娘峰 'Peak of the 2nd Sister') at 5,276 m (17,310 ft), Sãngūniang Fēng（三姑娘峰 'Peak of the 3rd Sister') at 5,355 m or 17,569 ft and the highest peak, Yāomèi Fēng (幺妹峰; 'peak of the youngest sister').

=== Ascents and Recreation ===
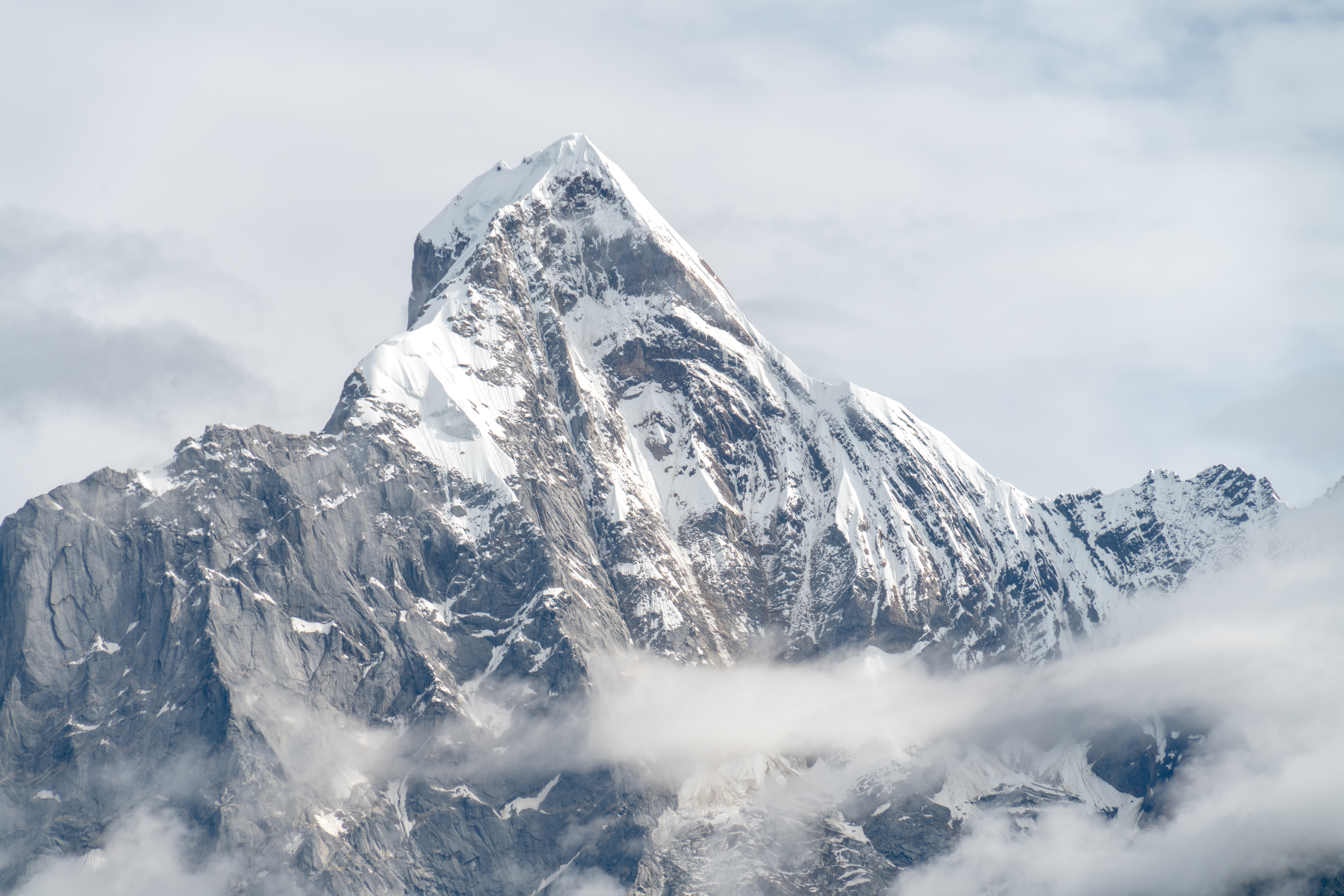
Yaomei Peak

The highest peak, also known as the "Queen of Sichuan's peaks" (蜀山皇后), stands at 6,250 m (20,510 ft). It is the easternmost 6,000 m (20,000 ft) or higher peak on Earth. The first ascent was in 1981 by a Japanese team via the east ridge. Very few people attempt to climb this and very few of those succeed. The first ascent of the southwest ridge was made in 2008 by Chad Kellogg and Dylan Johnson.

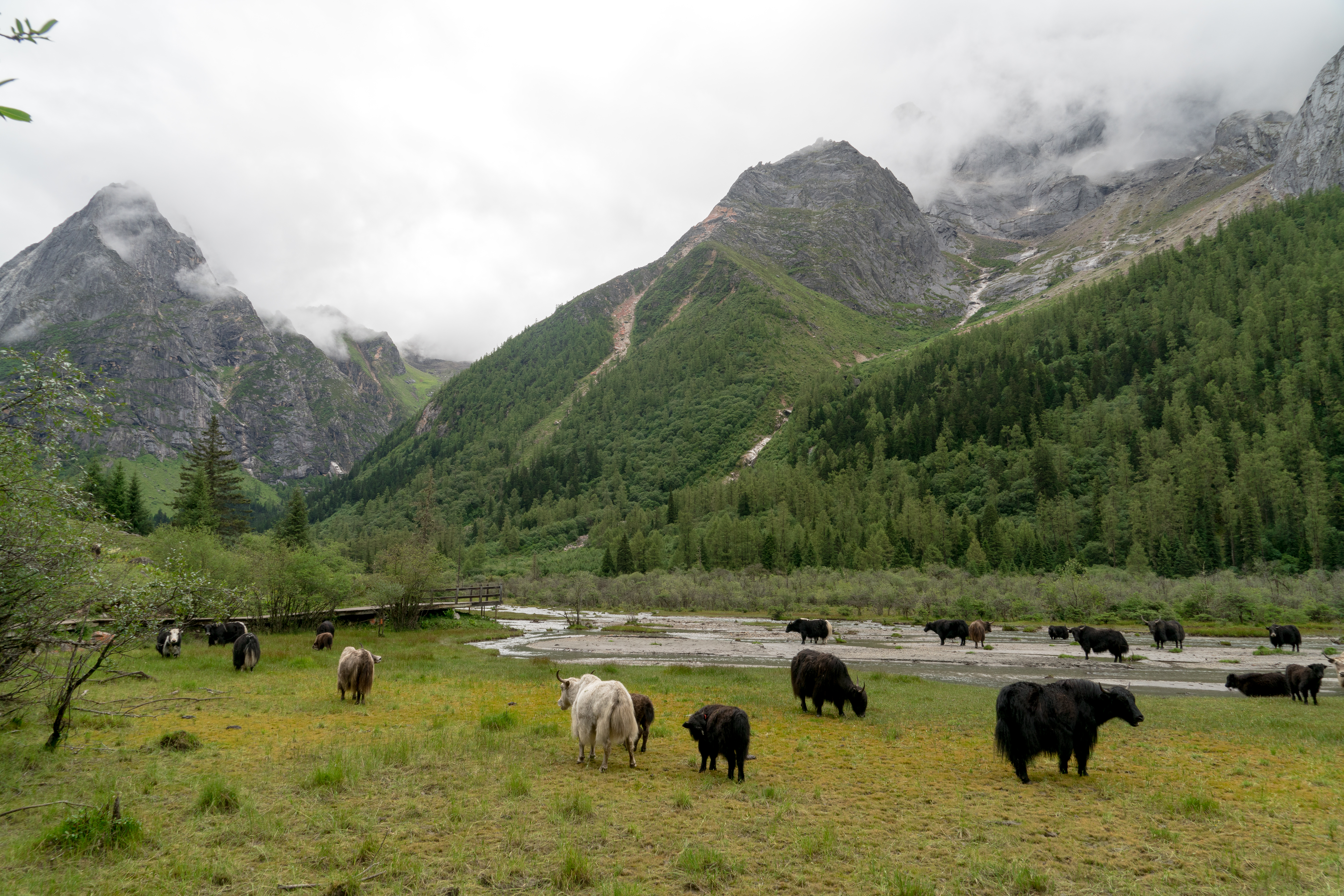
Yaks at Mount Siguniang Scenic Area

The three lower peaks are regular mountaineering destinations through all seasons. The lowest peak, Daguniang Feng is normally considered a pure trekking peak while Ergunian Feng and Sanguniang Feng are more challenging, requiring basic climbing techniques.

== See also ==
- List of ultras of Tibet, East Asia and neighbouring areas
