= Pavle Kozjek =

Slovenian photographer and pioneer (1959–2008)

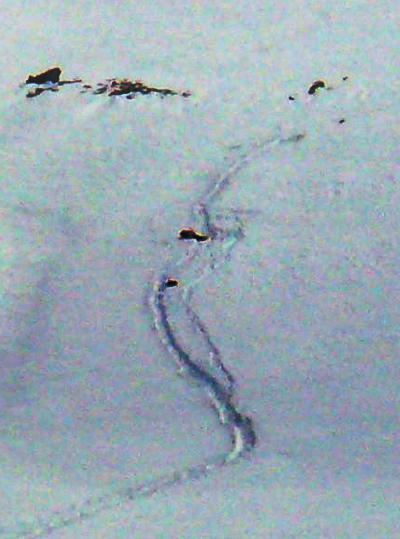
Nangpa La shootings: Kelsang Namtso lying in the snow after being shot and killed, photo by Pavle Kozjek

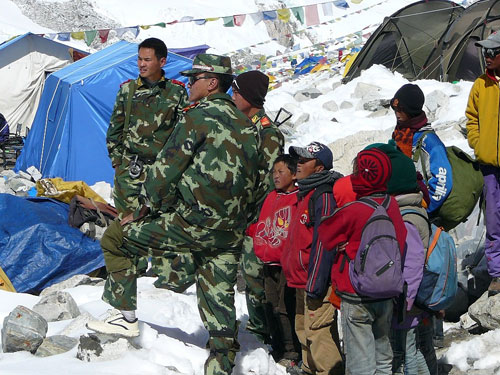
17 December 2006 photo by Pavle Kozjek of captured Tibetan refugee children after the murder of a Tibetan teenage nun shot in the back at hundreds of yards distance

Pavle Kozjek (15 January 1959 – 25 August 2008) was a Slovenian mountaineering pioneer and a photographer.

Kozjek was born in Setnica near Polhov Gradec, SR Slovenia, Yugoslavia. He was a member of the Ljubljana Matica Alpine Club. In 1997, he was the first Slovene climber to ascend Mount Everest without supplemental oxygen. On 2.10.2006, he soloed a new route up the southeastern face of Cho Oyu (8,201 m) in alpine style, completing the round trip from Advanced Base Camp (ABC, 6,200 m) in less than 15 hours. Also, at the ABC he took photographs of Nangpa La shootings - an ambush of unarmed Tibetan pilgrims by Chinese border guards attempting to leave Tibet via the Nangpa La pass. For his accomplishments he received the Piolet d'Or 2006 Spectators Choice.

In August 2008, Kozjek participated in an expedition with Dejan Miškovič and Gregor Kresal trying to climb Muztagh Tower in the Karakoram, Pakistan. On 25 August 2008, he fell from the mountain through a cornice and was reported dead a few days later. He is the 19th Slovene to die in the Himalayas.
