= Jobo Rinjang =

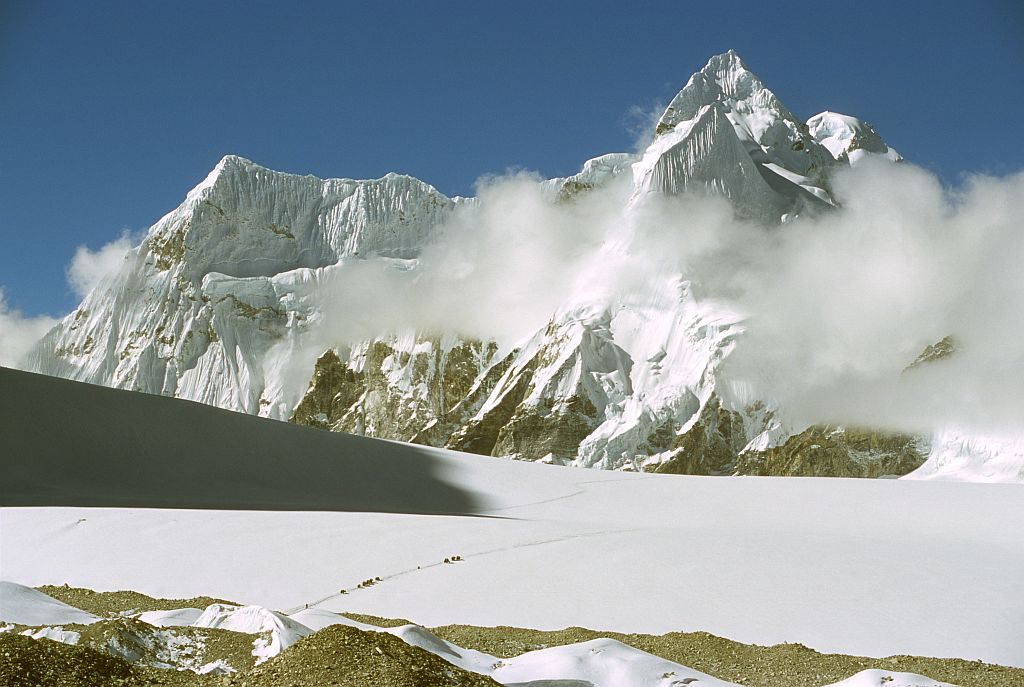
- Jobo Rinjang (extreme left)

Highest point
- Elevation: 6,666 m (21,870 ft)
- Prominence: 178 m (584 ft)
- Coordinates: 28°02′33″N 86°33′58″E

Geography
- Location within Koshi Province Location within Nepal
- Location: Namche
- Country: Nepal
- Province: Province No. 1
- District: Solukhumbu

Jobo Rinjang is a mountain located in Namche, Solukhumbhu, Nepal at an elevation of 6,666 metres (21,870 ft) above sea level. It was first climbed in 2009 by Joseph Puryear and David Gottlieb.
