= Qionglai Mountains =

Mountain range in Sichuan, China

Qionglai Range 邛崃山
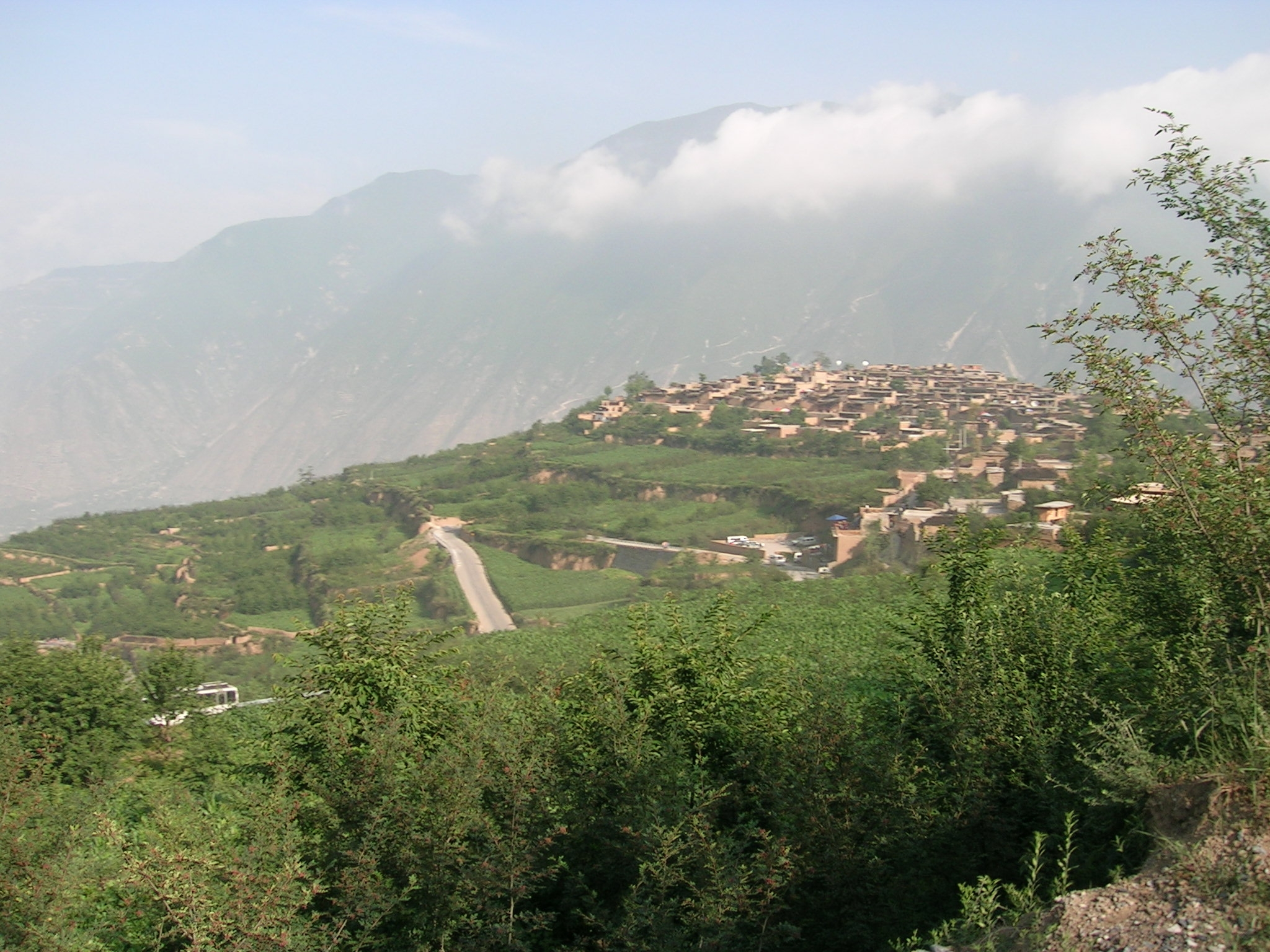
- A mountain village near Wenchuan, in the southern part of the range

Highest point
- Peak: Mount Siguniang (Four Girls)
- Elevation: 6,250 m (20,510 ft)
- Coordinates: 34°00′N 103°00′E

Geography
- Location within Sichuan
- Location: Sichuan
- Region: Asia
- Parent range: Hengduan Mountains

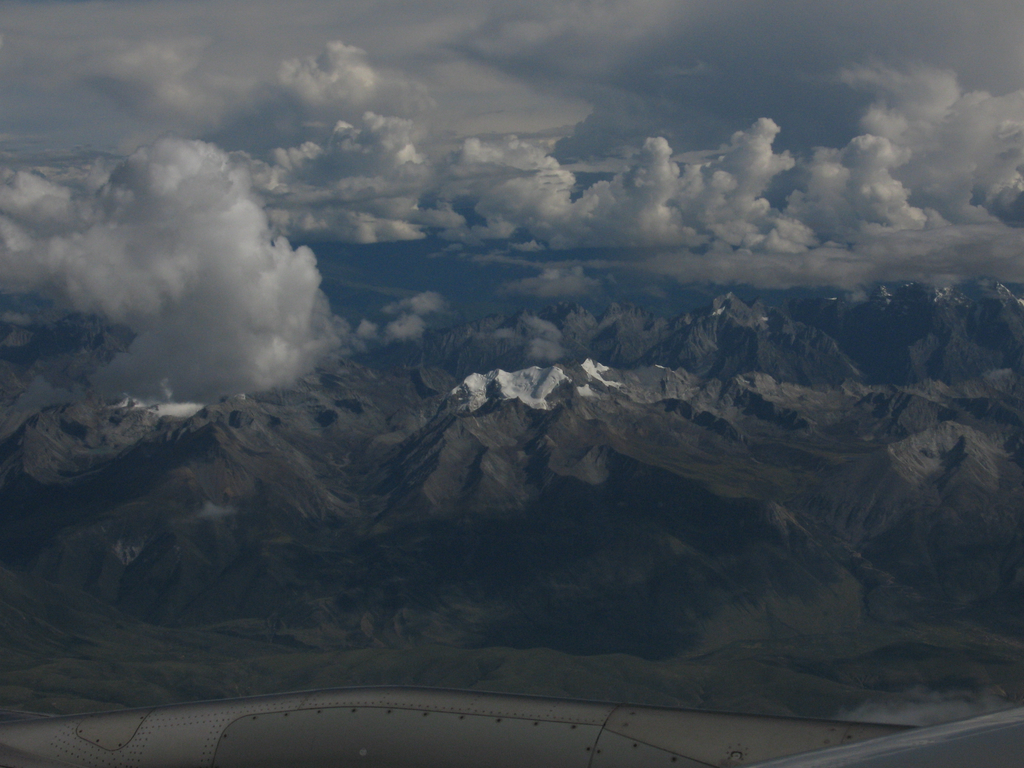
Southern Qionglai seen from a plane

Qionglai Mountains (simplified Chinese: 邛崃山; traditional Chinese: 邛崍山; pinyin: Qiónglái Shān) is a mountain range in the Sichuan Province of China. It runs in the general north–south direction, and is located mostly within the Ngawa Tibetan and Qiang Autonomous Prefecture, in the north-central part of the province.

== Geography ==
The Qionglai Range separates the basins of two major rivers of Sichuan: the Dadu River (to the west) and the Min River (to the east). Both rivers flow in the general southern direction, and are tributaries of the Yangtze.

The highest point of the Qionglai Mountains is Mount Siguniang (四姑娘山, "Four Girls' Mountain"), 6250 m in elevation; it is located in the southern part of the range. Some of the Sichuan Giant Panda Sanctuaries - in particular, the Wolong Nature Reserve and the Mt. Siguniang Scenic Park (四姑娘山风景名胜区) are located nearby.

== Ecology ==
The characteristic ecosystem of the Qionglai Mountains and the Min Mountains (a smaller mountain range which is located to the northeast of the Qionglai, separated from it by the Min River valley) has been described by the World Wildlife Fund as the Qionglai-Minshan conifer forests.

== See also ==
- Hengduan Mountains
