= Lunag Ri =

Mountain in Nepal

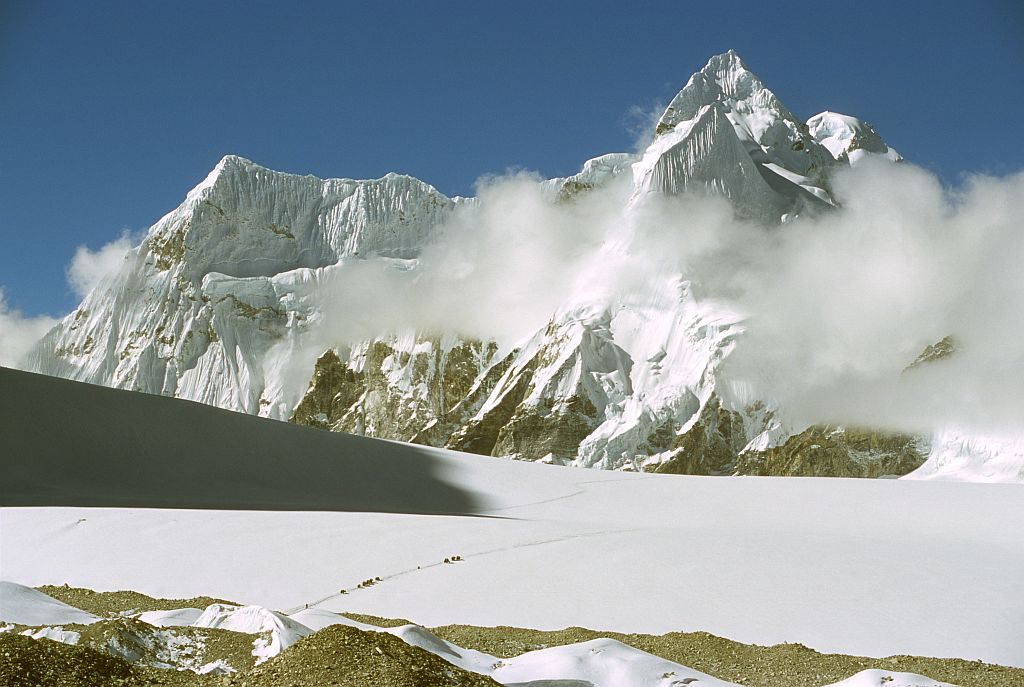
- View of Nangpa La and the Lunag Ri-massif, seen from the Cho Oyu base camp. The top of Lunag Ri is on the far right of the picture, half right in the background is the Lunag Ri IV, behind on the far left is the Jobo Rinjang.

Highest point
- Elevation: 6,895 m (22,621 ft)
- Prominence: 1,179 m (3,868 ft)
- Coordinates: 28°03′11″N 86°33′06″E

Geography
- Location within Nepal Location within Tibet
- Location: Solukhumbu District (Nepal), Tibet (China)
- Parent range: Rolwaling Himal

Climbing
- First ascent: October 25, 2018 by David Lama (solo)

Lunag Ri is a mountain in the Rolwaling Himal mountain range of the Himalayas.

The 6,895 metres (22,621 ft) high Lunag Ri is located on the Himalayan main ridge on the border between Nepal and Tibet. Lunag Ri is 11.7 km (7.3 miles) west of Cho Oyu (8,188 m (26,864 ft)). The Jobo Rinjang (6,778 m (22,238 ft)) forms a southeastern secondary summit of Lunag Ri. On the southern flank of the Lunag Ri runs the Lunag glacier. In the east flows the Nangpa glacier. On the northern slope lies the feeding area of the Shalong glacier.

== History ==
Lunag Ri was first climbed on October 25, 2018, by the Austrian climber David Lama, for which he won a 2019 Piolet d'Or. Lama ascended the mountain solo. Lama and the American climber Conrad Anker had failed to make the summit at two previous attempts in November 2015 and fall 2016. During the second attempt, Anker suffered a heart attack. A first solo attempt by Lama, which got him up to 6,700 metres (21,982 ft), the highest attempt to that date, had also been unsuccessful.
