= Dry-tooling =

Form of mixed climbing on bare rock

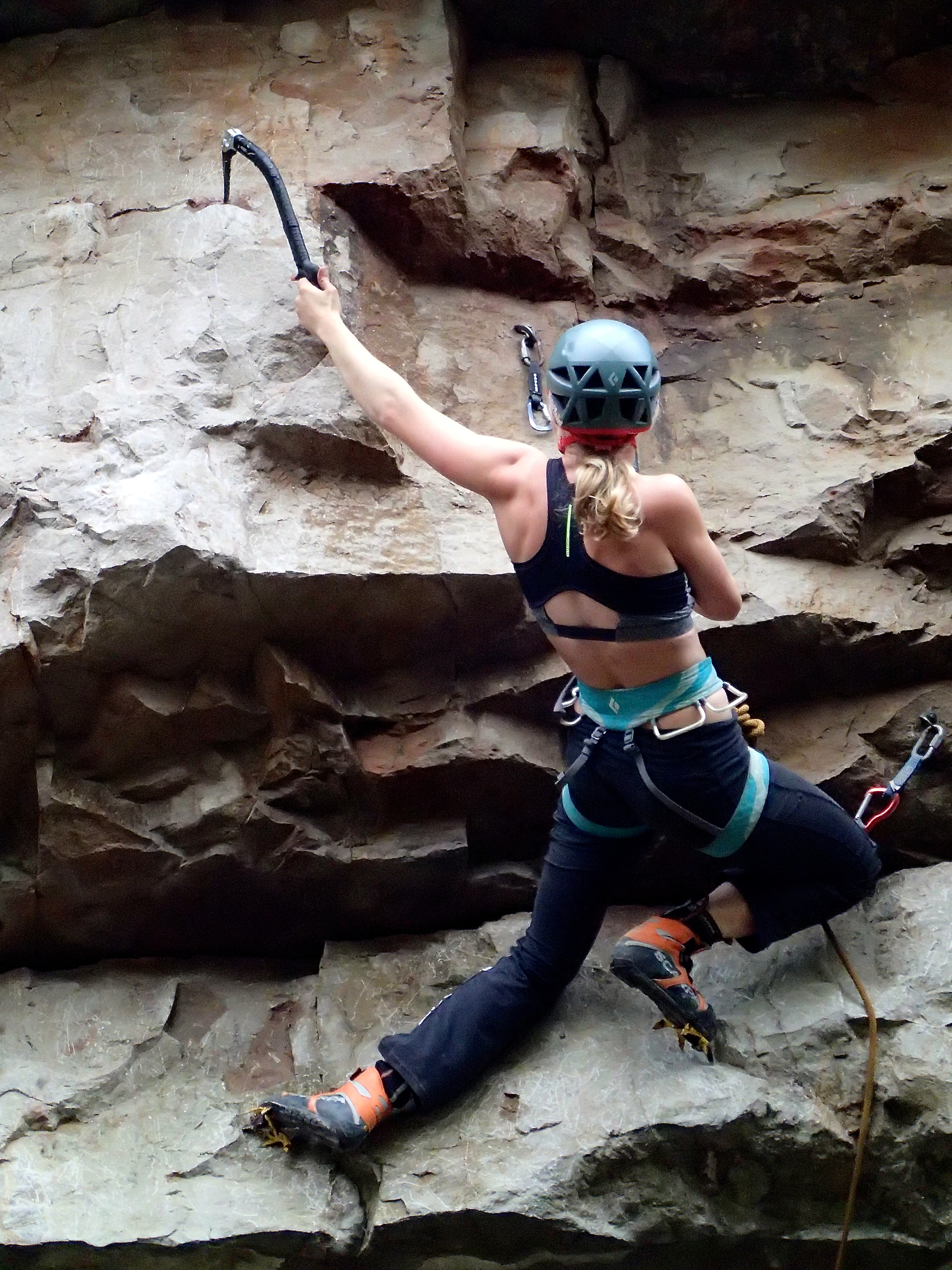
Climber dry-tooling on The Finish (grade D10), White Goods crag, Wales

Dry-tooling (or drytooling) is a form of mixed climbing that is performed on bare, ice-free, and snow-free, climbing routes. As with mixed-climbing, the dry-tooling climber uses a pair of ice tools and wears crampons to ascend the route. They will use normal rock climbing equipment for their protection on the route; many modern dry-tooling routes are now fully bolted as with sport climbing rock-climbing routes. Many indoor ice climbing competitions are held on bare non-iced surfaces and thus effectively dry-tooling events.

Dry-tooling as a standalone activity developed from the mid-1990s as the standards of mixed-climbing rose dramatically, and the most difficult part of the new extreme M-graded mixed-climbing routes was often the dry-tooling component (e.g. a bare rock roof or a severe rock overhang). Some of the most extreme mixed-climbing routes will also quote a dry-tooling D-grade alongside the M-grade to signify whether there was any ice encountered (i.e. Iron Man in Switzerland is graded M14+/D14+).

As dry-tooling uses the equipment and techniques of mixed climbing, it has followed its increased regulation of equipment to counter criticisms that it is a form of aid climbing. Dry-tooling has faced additional criticisms due to the damage it can do to natural rock surfaces (e.g the ice tools scraping and chipping at the bare rock face), and dry-tooling climbing areas are usually separate from rock climbing areas. Dry tooling has been advocated as a more accessible sport for women as the ice tools help with the physical strain.

== Description ==
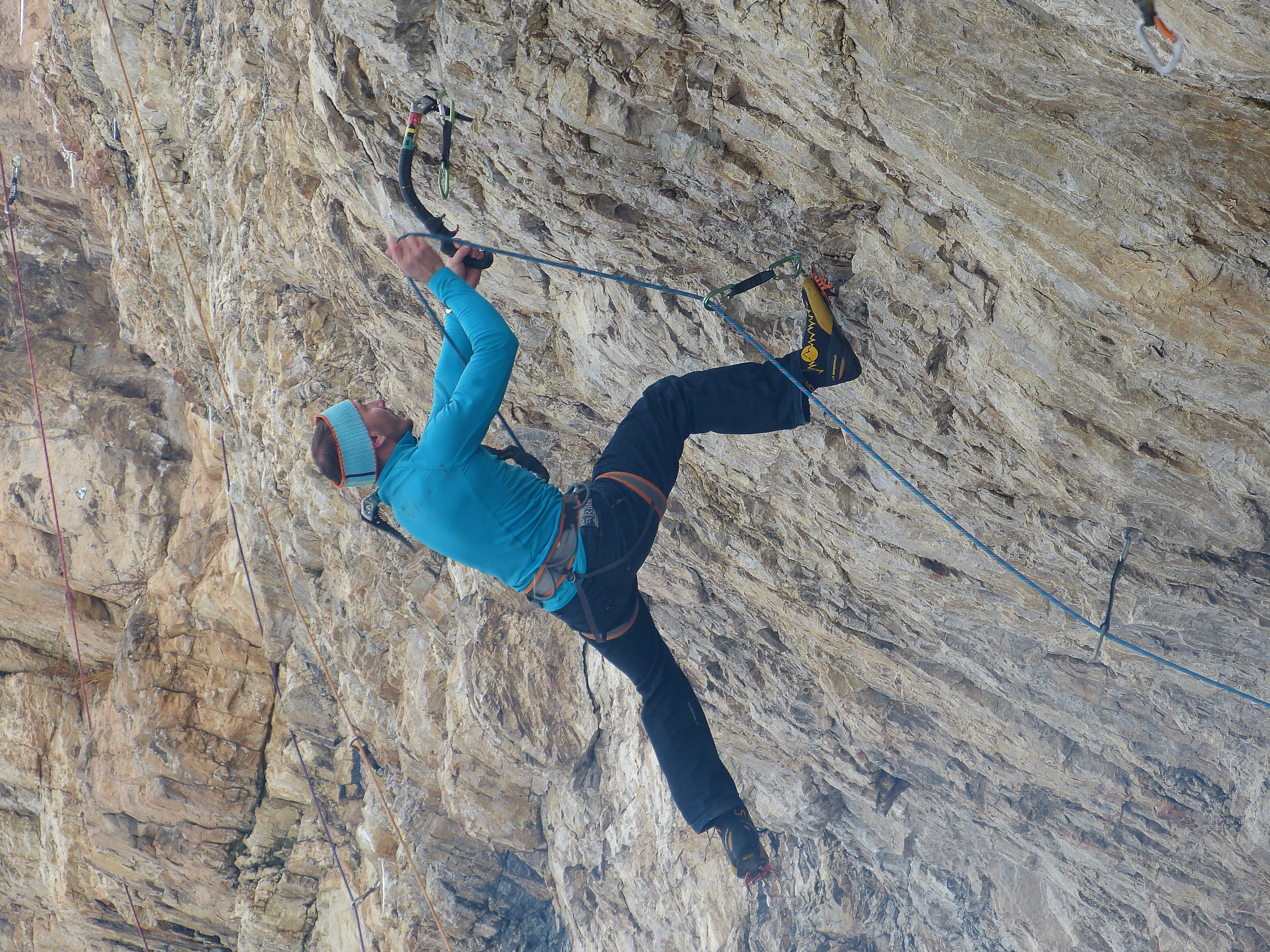
Climber dry-tooling in the Alps

Dry-tooling is mixed climbing performed on surfaces that have no ice or snow. The equipment is identical to mixed climbing, except that none of the ice climbing tools used by mixed climbers for providing protection on the route are employed (e.g. ice screws). Dry-tooling climbers use the same fruit boots, monopoint crampons, heel spurs, and advanced leashless ice axes, which mixed climbers use. All of the unique techniques used in mixed climbing including stein pulls, torque pulls, undercling pulls, and figure-four moves are also used in dry-tooling.

While dry-tooling techniques have long been in use in the sport of alpine climbing, the modern sport of dry-tooling is associated with the use of bolted protection on standalone routes, in the same manner as sport climbing developed on standalone rock climbing routes. Like sport climbing, dry-tooling is also closely associated with competition climbing but in the ice climbing discipline. In tandem with the related sports of mixed and ice climbing, the equipment of dry-tooling has become more closely governed and regulated to counter criticisms of the sport being akin to aid climbing. For example, dry-tooling in competition ice climbing no longer allows ice axe leashes and controls the dimensions of tools and the use of heel spurs.

=== Types of routes ===
Dry-tooling climbers avoid rock climbing venues as the action of the ice axe can damage fragile holds (i.e. dry-tooling climbers do not attempt to repeat graded rock climbing routes). Popular dry-tooling bolted venues are therefore often explicitly unsuitable for rock climbing due to weak rock (e.g. choss rock as found in the Dolomites or in the Fang Amphitheater in Vail, Colorado), and/or are perpetually in damp and wet condition.

Leading dry-tooling climbers focus on roofs to push standards (and under DTS conditions), and thus many of the most important venues are caves (or quasi-caves), such as A Line Above the Sky (D15 DTS), Parallel World (D16 DTS) in the Tomorrow's World Cave in Marmolada, Bichette Light (D14 DTS) in the L'Usine Cave in Grenoble, or the Storm Giant (D16) in a remote cave in Fernie, British Columbia.

== History ==
Dry-tooling has always been used by ice climbers and mixed climbers to train in the summer months of the off-season, and as part of mixed climbing, dry-tooling techniques have been used in alpine climbing for decades. In 1994, when Jeff Lowe dry-tooled a bare rock roof to get to the impressive hanging icicle of Octopussy in Vail, Colorado, and graded his ascent at WI6 M8, the sport of mixed climbing, but also dry-tooling was born.

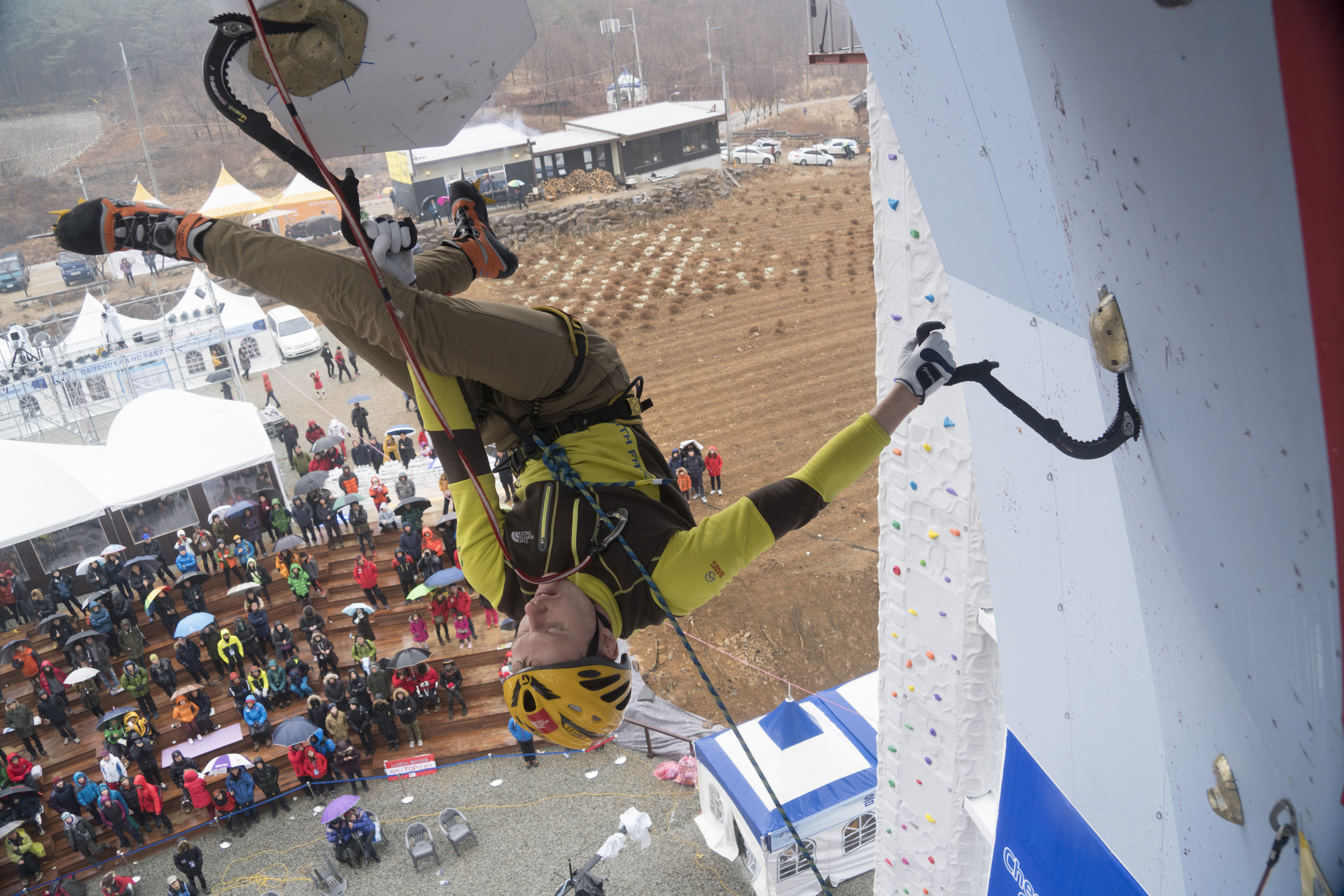
Climber doing a dry-tooling figure-four move and undercling pull at the 2016 UIAA Ice Climbing World Cup

While the early surge from 1994 to 2003 was focused on developing mixed climbing routes with sections of both rock and ice, as M-graded milestones rose, the technical challenges became more concentrated on the dry-tooling part of the routes, and particularly on breaching ever-larger roofs. At the same time, the UIAA Ice Climbing World Cup events were being held on non-iced surfaces that were essentially dry-tooling routes, and UIAA male and female competitors also began to push dry-tooling standards in the outside environment.

In 2010, French climbers, including Jeff Mercier, introduced Dry Tooling Style (DTS), restricting equipment use and prohibiting figure-four and figure-nine moves (also called a "yaniro"). Competitions under DTS rules have been held, and several leading dry-tooling climbers have set new grade milestones in DTS fashion.

In 2012, Swiss climber Robert Jasper made the first ascent of Iron Man in completely dry conditions and graded it D14+, using a "D" prefix to denote "dry conditions"; he then repeated the route later in iced conditions and added a grade of M14+, for "mixed conditions". In 2016, when the late British climber Tom Ballard freed the hardest dry-tooling climb in history, A Line Above the Sky, he graded it D15 DTS (i.e. done in the DTS style) and avoided the "M" prefix.

== Equipment ==
The equipment used in dry-tooling is the same as is used in mixed climbing, including fruit boots, mono points, heel spurs, and advanced ice axes.

Climbing with ice axes, but without crampons; whether with climbing shoes or boots it's tolerated. This may give an advantage like in the opening of the BASE route on the West face of Petit Dru.

== Technique ==
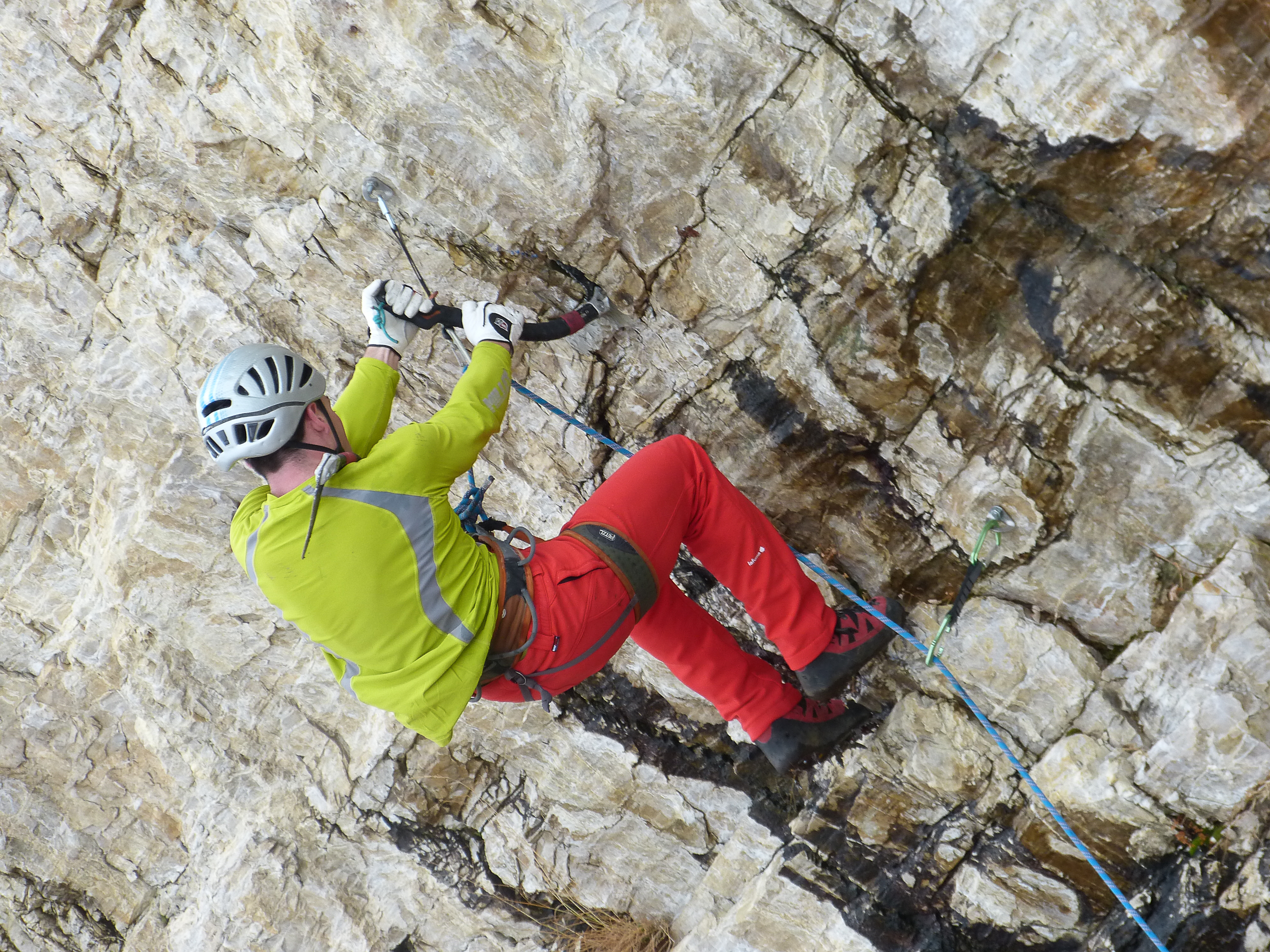
Using a stein pull

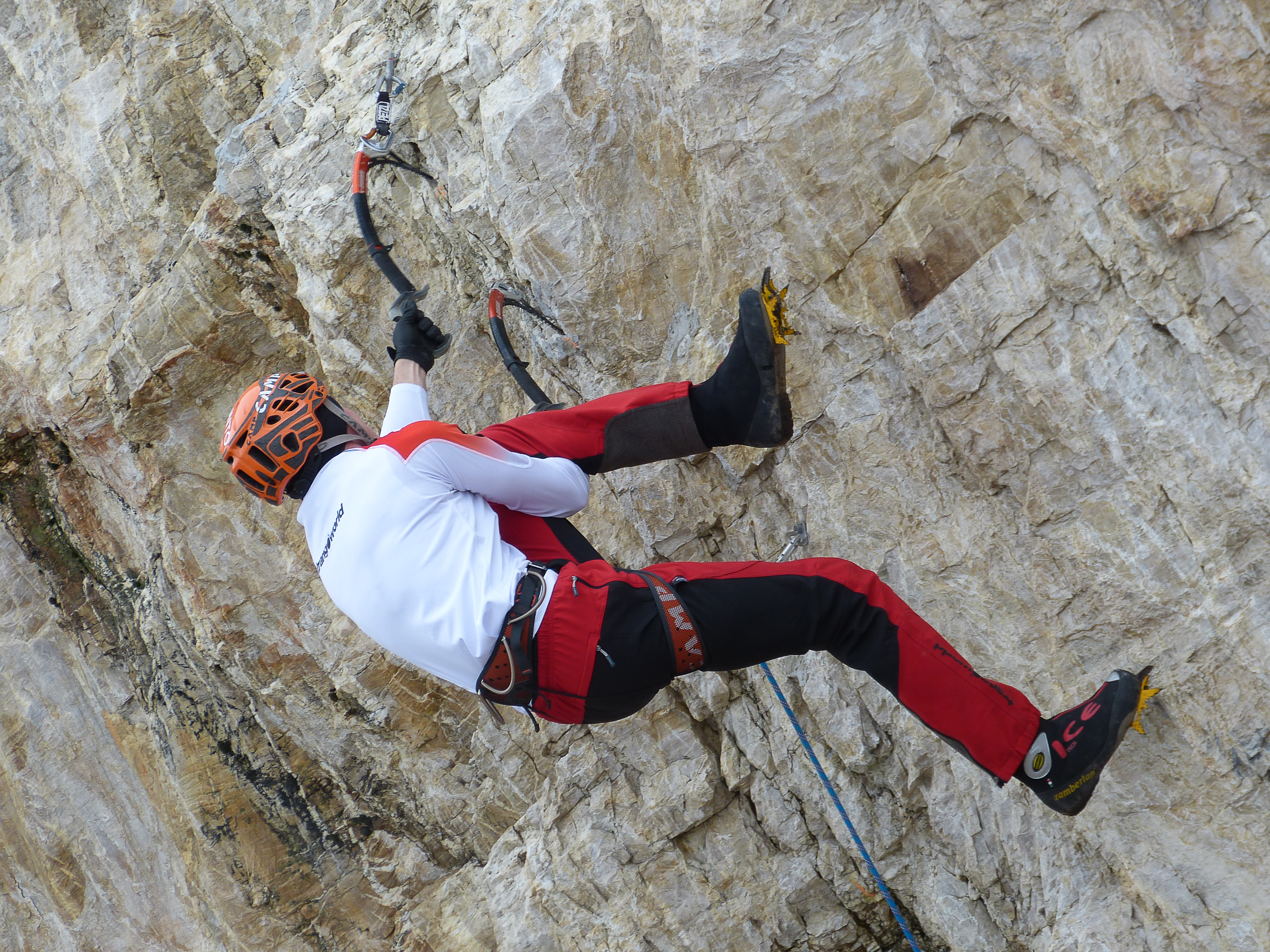
Using a figure-four move and wearing fruit boots

As well as using standard techniques of ice climbing (e.g. front pointing) and of rock climbing (e.g. crack climbing, but with ice axes), dry-tooling climbers have developed a range of techniques that are largely unique to their sport (and the derived sport of mixed-tooling). These include:

- Stein pull. The climber inverts their ice axe and wedges the blade upwards into cracks in the rock, gaining an upward momentum by then pulling down on the handle (with the blade wedged). Stein pulls are used frequently on overhanging sections, and for creating a resting position.
- Undercling pull. The climber has gone above the stein pull hold, and can either convert their stein pull into a mantel-type move (i.e. pushing down on the handle), or can re-set the axe blade into an undercling pull where they pull themselves into the rock; an advanced technique that absorbs a lot of energy.
- Torque pull. The climber wedges the blade of their ice axe into a crack and then pulls sideways, thus creating "torque" between the axe and the wedged blade, enabling the climber to move upwards. Torque pulls are used frequently to ascent vertical cracks.
- Figure-four. The climber creates a lock-off with their arm so that the ice axe is wedged into the rock, and the arm holding the axe is locked at an angle; they then use this arm like a hold by hooking their "opposite" leg over the arm and pushing their leg down to reach upward. A figure-nine uses the "non-opposite" leg.

In addition, dry-tooling climbers try to keep their elbows near their sides (i.e. to avoid draining energy in torque and stein pulls), and are very careful in extracting wedged blades (i.e. which can ricochet back into the climber's face), and of gently balancing the front points of their crampons on thin holds.

== Evolution of grade milestones ==
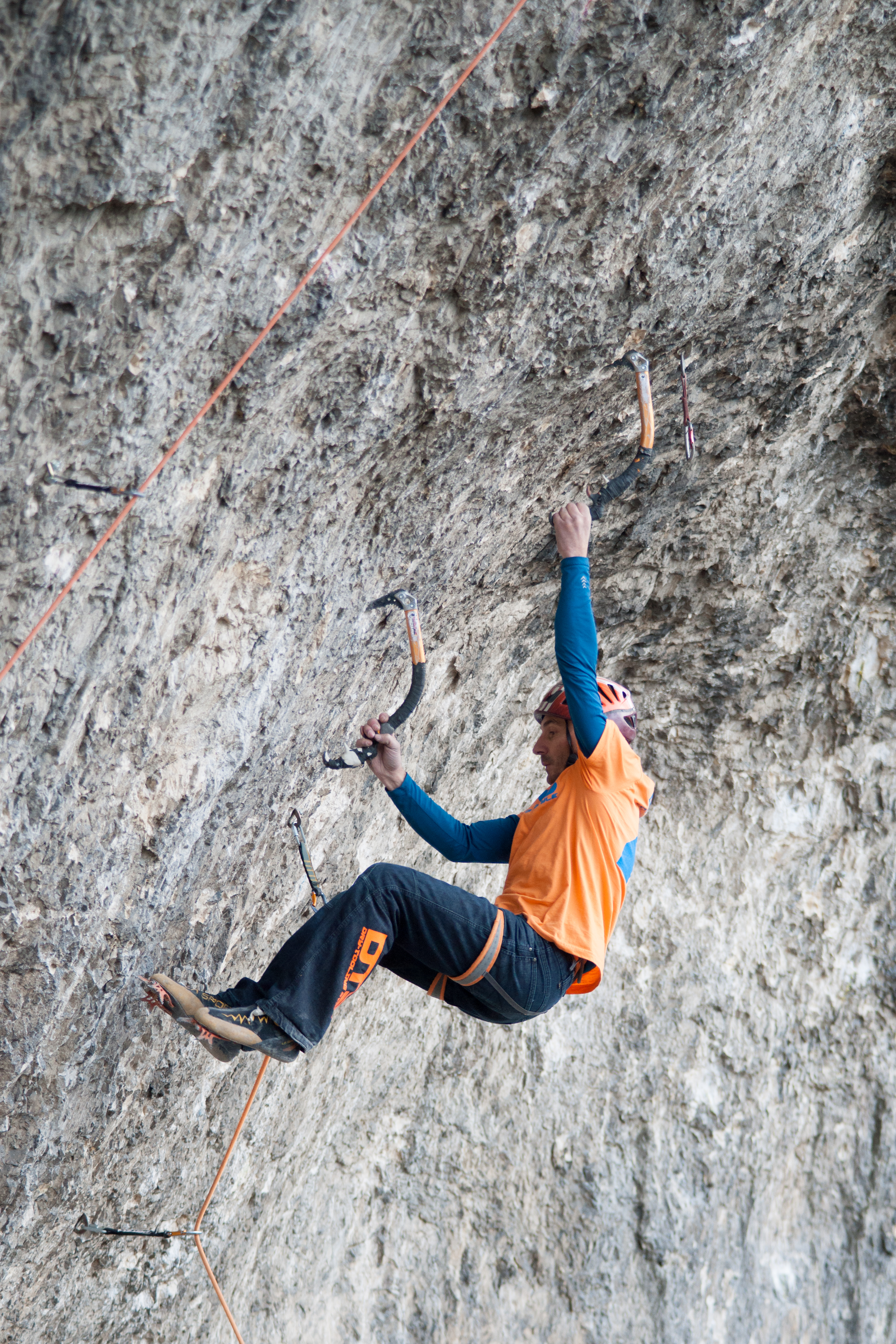
Jeff Mercier in the final of a DTS Tour event, 2014

While many mixed M-graded routes can be described as combinations of D-graded dry-tooling routes and WI-graded ice climbing routes, it was not until Robert Jasper's ascent of Iron Man in 2012, that D-grades became commonly used for routes that had no ice whatsoever—introducing the dry-tooling grade.

- 2009. Bichette Light D14 DTS L'Usine Cave, Grenoble, France. First ascent was in 2009 by Jeff Mercier and is the first D14 in dry-tool history; Mercier did it in DTS fashion and consensus is now D14.
- 2012. Iron Man D14+ Eptingen, Switzerland. First ascent was in 2012 by Robert Jasper and was one of the first D14+s in dry-tool history; Japer climbed it in dry conditions grading it D14+, and did it later in iced conditions grading it M14+ (the first M14+ in history).
- 2016. A Line Above the Sky D15 DTS Tomorrow's World Cave, Dolomites, Italy. First ascent was in 2016 by Tom Ballard and is considered the first D15 in dry-tool climbing history; Ballard also climbed it in DTS fashion. Grade was confirmed by Gaetan Raymond, Dariusz Sokołowski and Jeff Mercier.
- 2017. Storm Giant D16 Fernie, British Columbia, Canada. First ascent was in 2017 by Gordon McArthur and is considered the first proposed D16; McArthur climbed it in classic style and the route has not been repeated (access is now forbidden).
- 2019. Parallel World D16 DTS Tomorrow's World Cave, Dolomites, Italy. First ascent was in 2019 by Darek Sokołowski and is the first D16 in dry-tool climbing history that was done in DTS fashion. Then the route has been downgraded to D15+ by Kwon YoungHye and Matteo Pilon. It was repeated in DTS style in 2024 by Victor Varoshkin and in 2025 by Filip Princi. The first female ascent belongs to Katie McKinstry Stylos who proposed the grade D15+/D16 in 2025.
- 2021. Aletheia D16 Tana del Drago ("Dragon's Den"), Ponte nelle Alpi, Italy. First ascent by Matteo Pilon; second by Kevin Lindlau in 2024, who confirmed the D16 grade for the first time; third by Giovanni Bona at the very end of 2024.
- 2024. Téleios D16+ Tana del Drago, Ponte nelle Alpi, Italy. First ascent by Matteo Pilon. Téleios is the first proposed D16+. The route has been repeated by Giovanni Bona in 2025, who confirmed the grade.

=== Female grade milestones ===
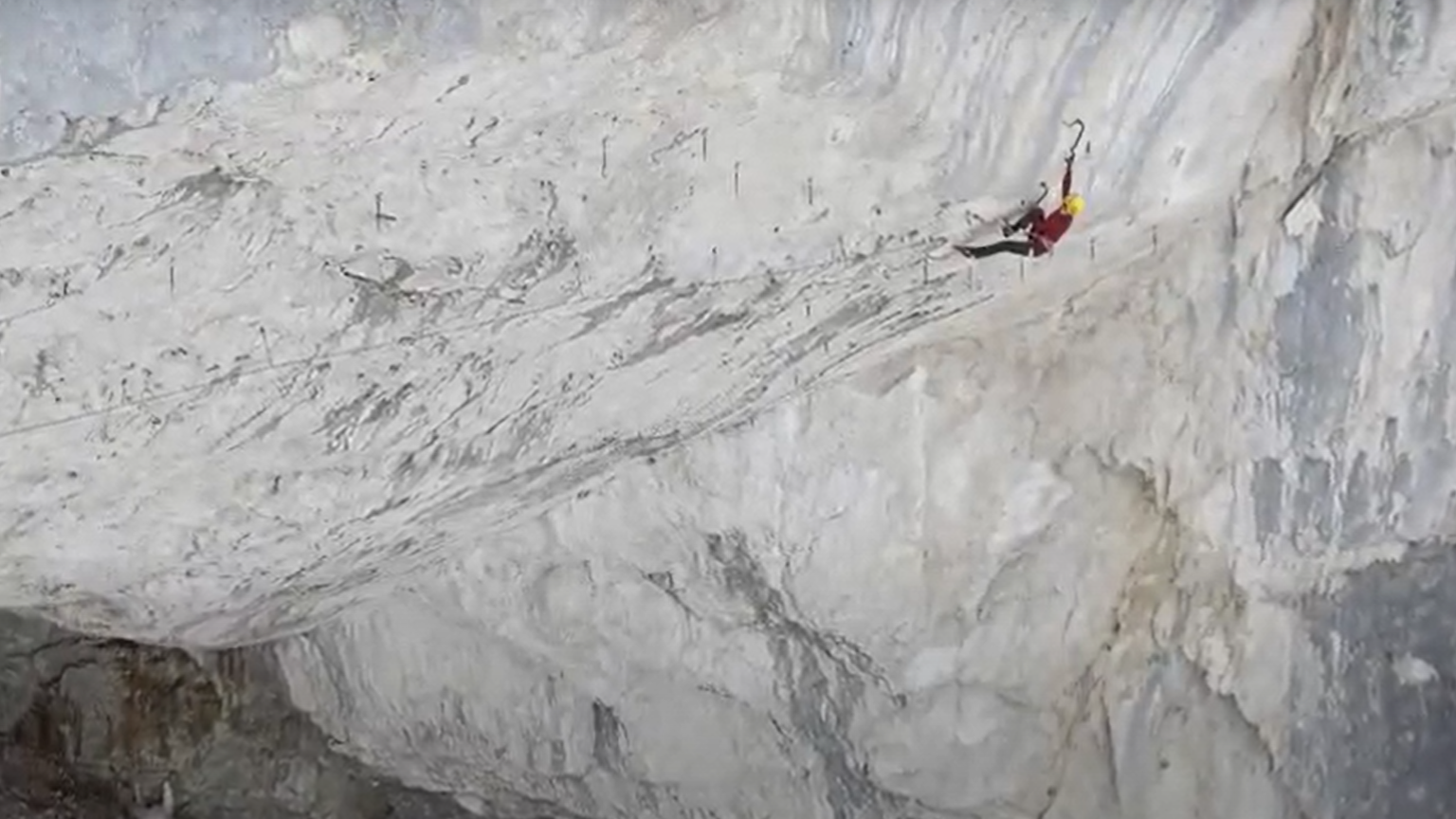
Angelika Rainer on French Connection (D15-), Tomorrow's World Cave, Marmolada, Italy

Most leading female dry-tooling climbers are competition ice climbers from the UIAA Ice Climbing World Cup tour; on several occasions, female dry-tooling climbers have set grade milestones that matched the highest male grades at the time; dry-tooling has been advocated as an accessible sport for women:

- 2007. Law and Order D13 Diebsöfen, Austria. First female ascent was in 2007 by Ines Papert and is considered the first D13 by a female in dry-tooling history; also graded M13 but is largely a dry route.
- 2013. Iron Man D14+ Eptingen, Switzerland. First female ascent was in 2013 by Lucie Hrozová and is considered the first D14 by a female in dry-tooling history; at the time of Hrozová's ascent Iorn Man was considered the hardest route in the world.
- 2017. A Line Above the Sky D15 Tomorrow's World Cave, Dolomites, Italy. First female ascent was in 2017 by Angelika Rainer and is considered the first D15 by a female in dry-tool history; at the time the highest male grade was also D15.
- 2025 "Parallel World" D15+/D16 Tomorrow's World Cave, Italy. First female ascent by Katie McKinstry Stylos. A few weeks later she also repeated "Arché" D15+ in Tana del Drago, Italy.

== See also ==
- Glossary of climbing terms
- Alpine climbing
- Ice climbing
- Mixed climbing
