= Ice climbing =

Type of climbing with ice tools

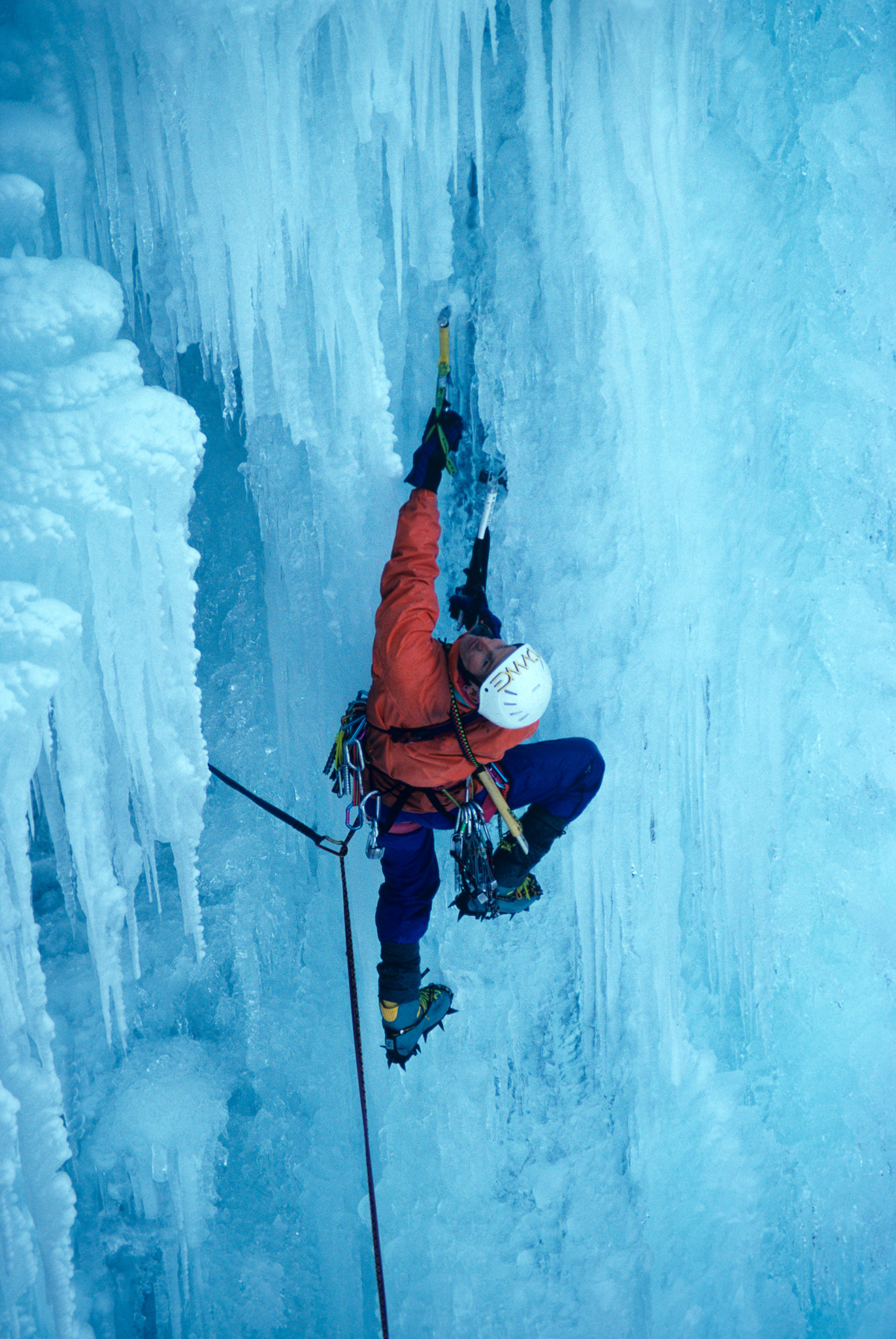
Xaver Bongard on Crack Baby (350 metres, IV, WI6), Switzerland

Ice climbing is a climbing discipline that involves ascending routes consisting entirely of frozen water. To ascend, the ice climber uses specialist equipment, particularly double ice axes (or the more modern ice tools) and rigid crampons. To protect the route, the ice climber uses steel ice screws that require skill to employ safely and rely on the ice holding firm in any fall. Ice climbing routes can vary significantly by type, and include seasonally frozen waterfalls, high permanently frozen alpine couloirs, and large hanging icicles.

Ice climbing originated as a subdiscipline of alpine climbing, where sections of scalable ice are encountered on alpine routes alongside segments that require rock or mixed climbing. Ice climbing arose as an independent sport in the 1970s. Modern ice climbing includes a difficulty grading system that peaks at WI6 to WI7, as ice tends to hang vertically at its most severe. WI7 is very rare and usually attributed to overhanging ice with serious risk issues (i.e. unstable ice, little protection, and a risk of death). Advancements in mixed climbing in the 1980s pushed the technical difficulty of ice-climbing routes by introducing rock overhangs and roofs that can entail dry-tooling, which is the use of ice tools on bare rock.

Since 2002, the UIAA have regulated competition ice climbing, which is offered in a lead climbing format on an artificial bolted wall, generally on indoor rock climbing artificial walls without ice, that employs dry-tooling techniques (e.g. stein pulls and figure-four moves), and in a speed climbing format that uses a standardized wall of real ice. Since 2010, ice climbers at Helmcken Falls in Canada have used the unique characteristics of the waterfall to create severely overhanging bolted ice climbing routes that are graded up to WI13, and are the hardest technical (Note: Because the ice climbing routes at Helmcken Falls all have fixed in-situ bolts for climbing protection, they are much safer and more akin to sport climbing routes in rock climbing; they do not carry the significant danger of a traditional +WI5 non-bolted ice climbing route that relies on ice screws for climbing protection) ice climbs in the world.

== Description ==
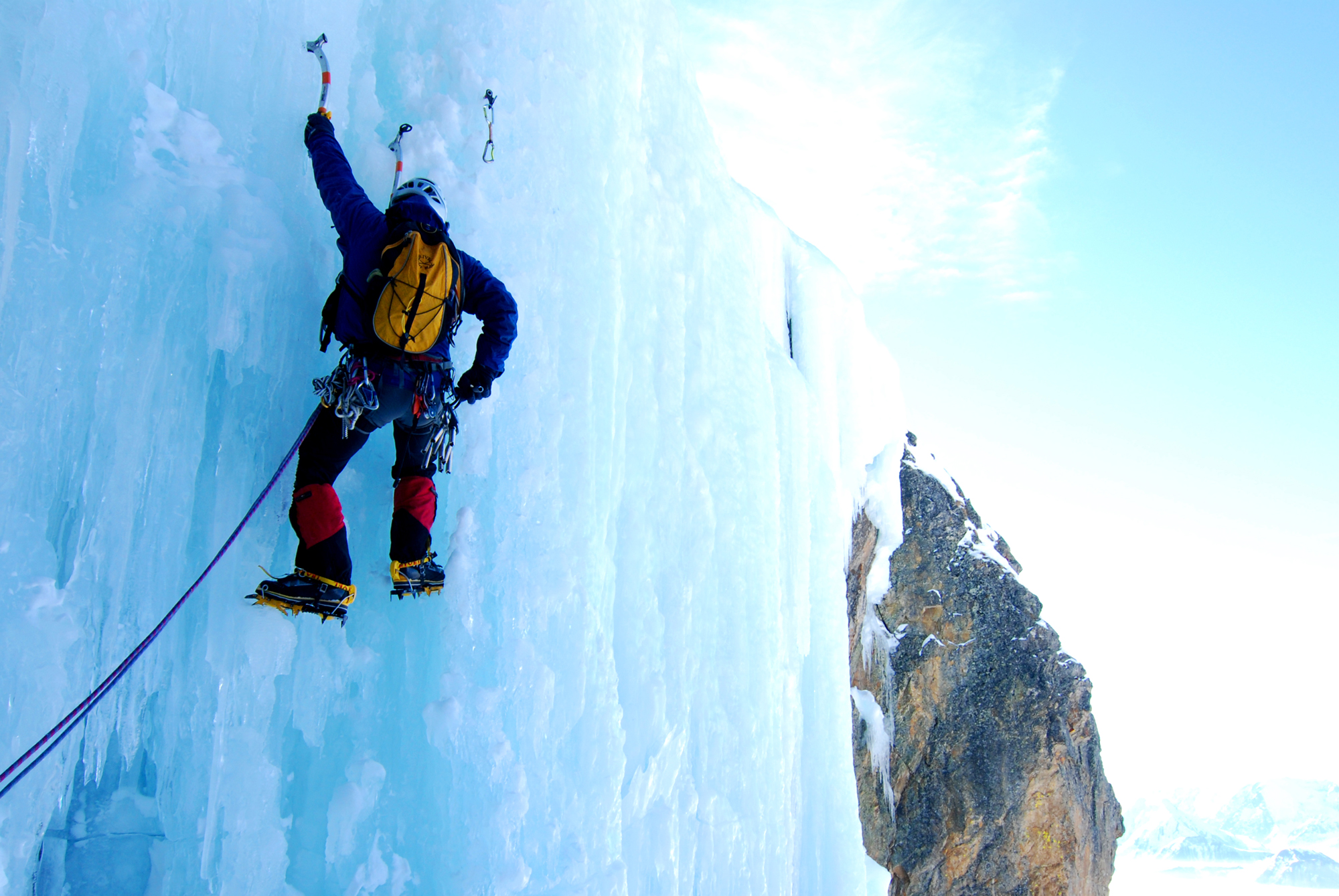
Lead climber on Symphonie d'Automne (135-metres, WI4), France, about to clip their rope into a quickdraw that is hanging from an ice screw that thay have inserted

Ice climbing uses specialized equipment, namely ice tools and crampons, to ascend routes consisting of frozen water ice, and/or frozen snow fields. As with rock climbing, ice climbing can be done as free climbing and performed in climbing pairs where the lead climber inserts climbing protection equipment into the ice route as they ascend for their safety. After the lead climber has reached the top, the second-climber (or belayer) then removes this protection as they ascend the route.

The protection equipment that is used when leading ice routes are specialized steel ice screws. The ice screws require considerable experience to use properly and safely, and given that the underlying condition of the ice can change materially over time (including constantly breaking off), the seriousness of leading an ice climbing route is considered to be greater than that of a traditional rock climbing route. For example, while an intermediate ice climber could 'top rope' a WI4-graded ice climbing route, 'leadclimbing' WI4-graded route is a far more serious undertaking. In contrast to rock climbing, "the leader must not fall" ethos is a core part of ice climbing.

Ice climbing can also be performed as free solo climbing, which is an even riskier undertaking (the climber uses their ice tools and crampons but has no climbing protection such as ice screws); or performed as top roping which is the safest form of ice climbing and the format used for novices being introduced to the sport.

Ice climbing was developed as part of the broader climbing discipline of alpine climbing, where it is still a key component of the alpinist's skill set. Where the ice climbing route does not fully consist of ice and has elements of bare rock, it is known as mixed climbing. Where the route has no ice whatsoever, but the climber still uses the ice tools and crampons, it is known as dry-tooling. Because mixed climbing and dry-tooling routes can be fully bolted — just like sport climbing routes are in rock climbing (i.e because there is bare rock into which bolts can be drilled) — they have become popular as safer alternatives to traditional ice routes.

=== Types of routes ===
Types of ice climbing routes

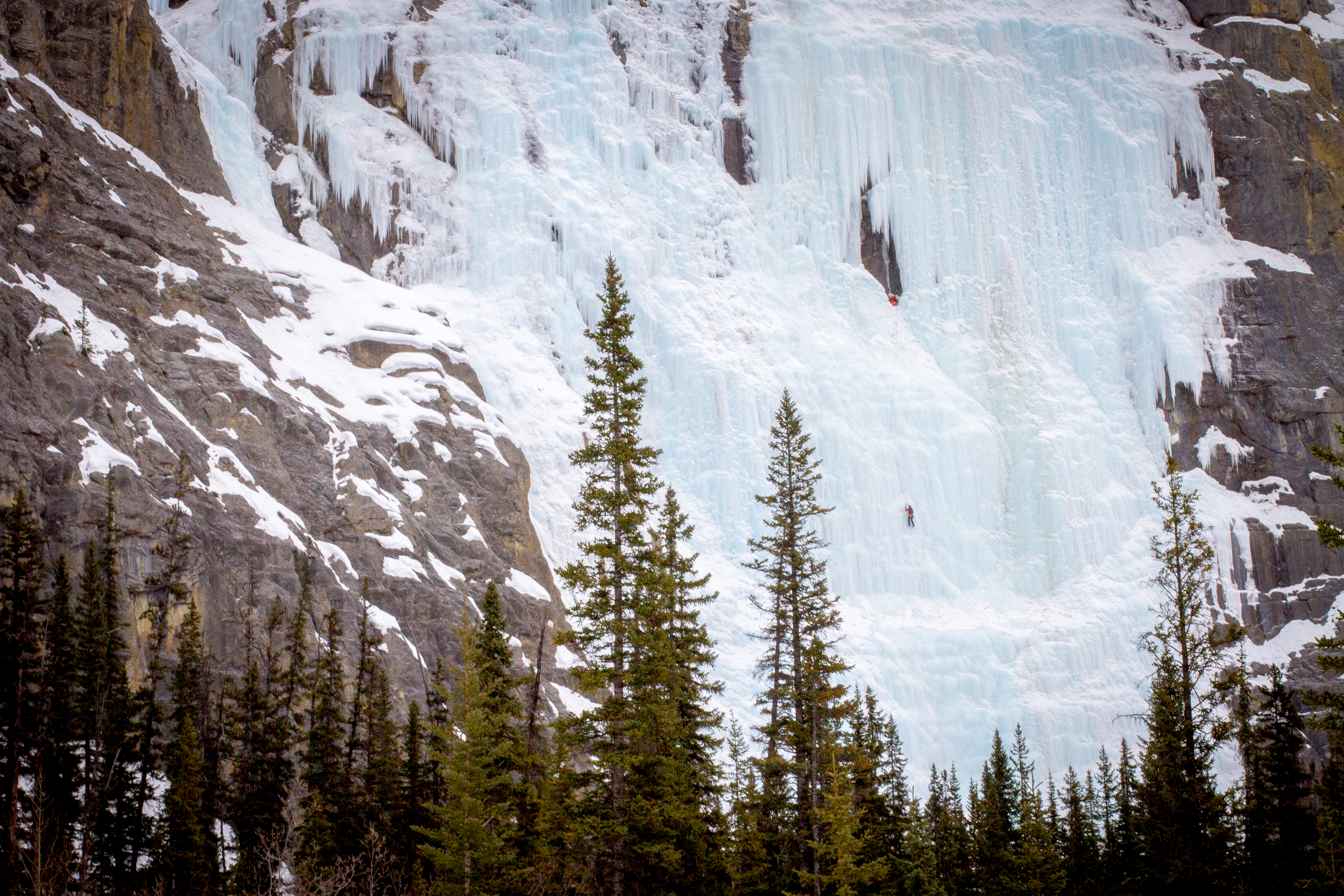
Central Pillar (WI5+), Weeping Wall, Canada

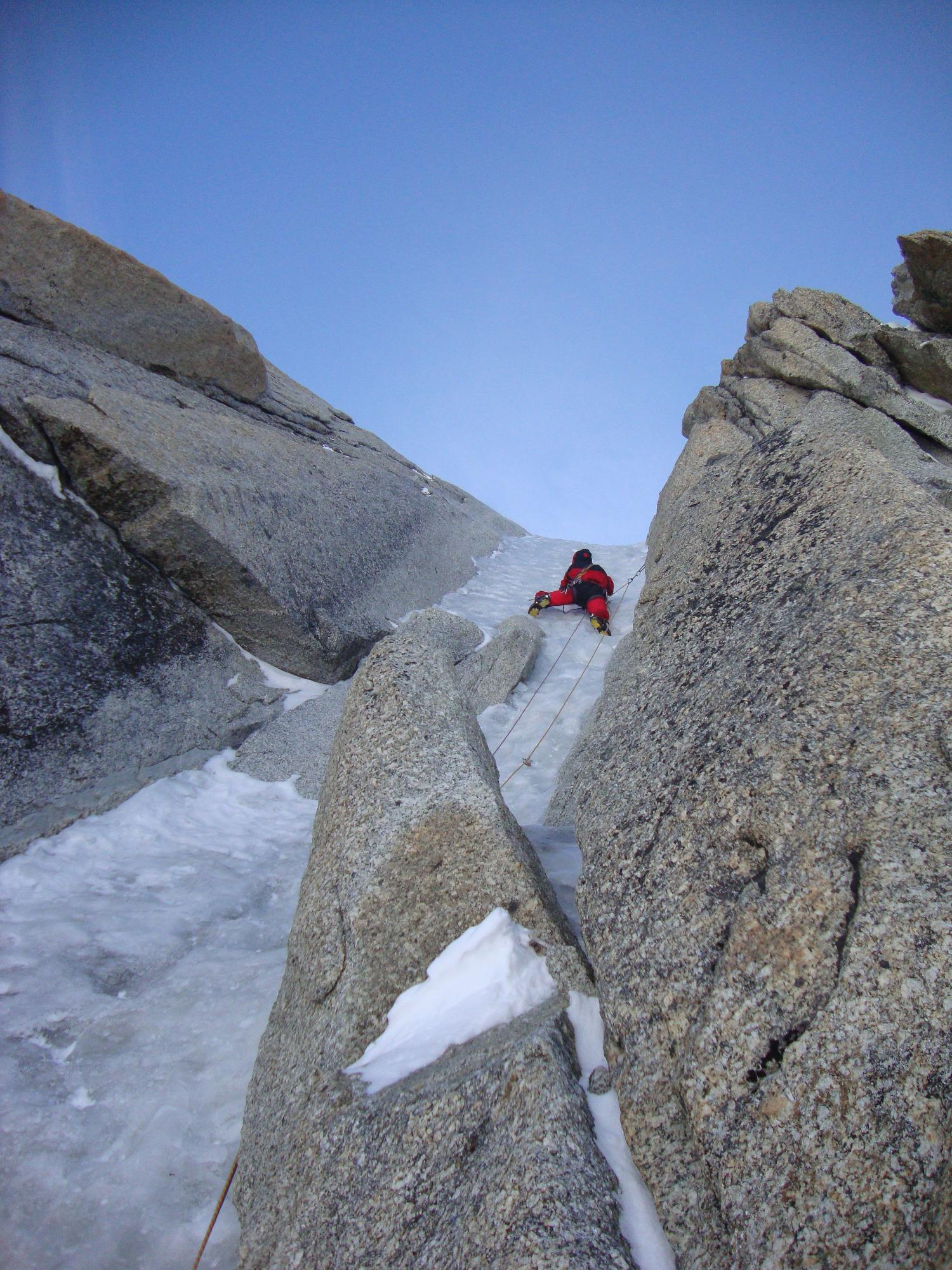
Chéré Couloir (WI4 M3), France

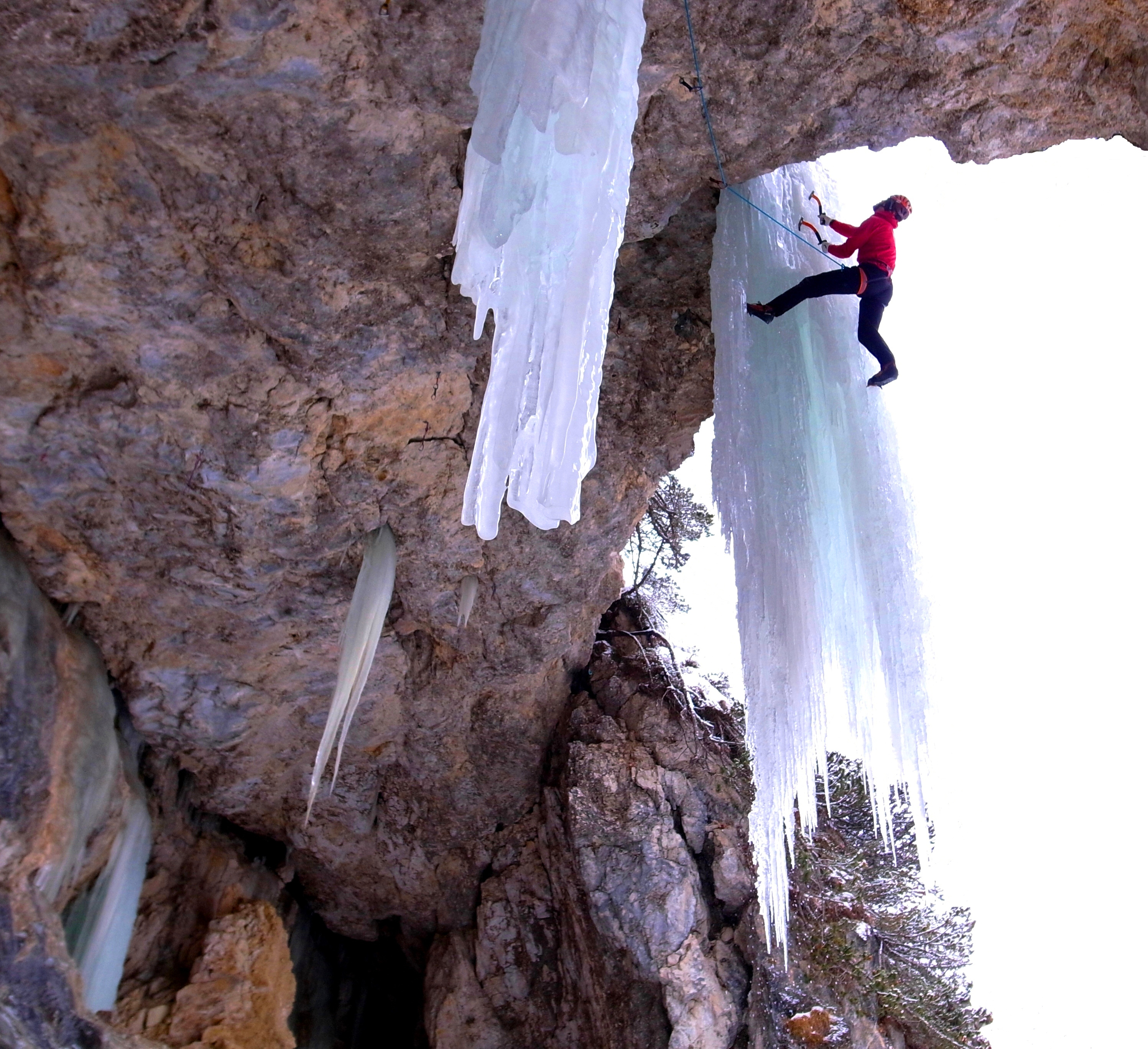
Silent Memories (WI6, M9), Italy

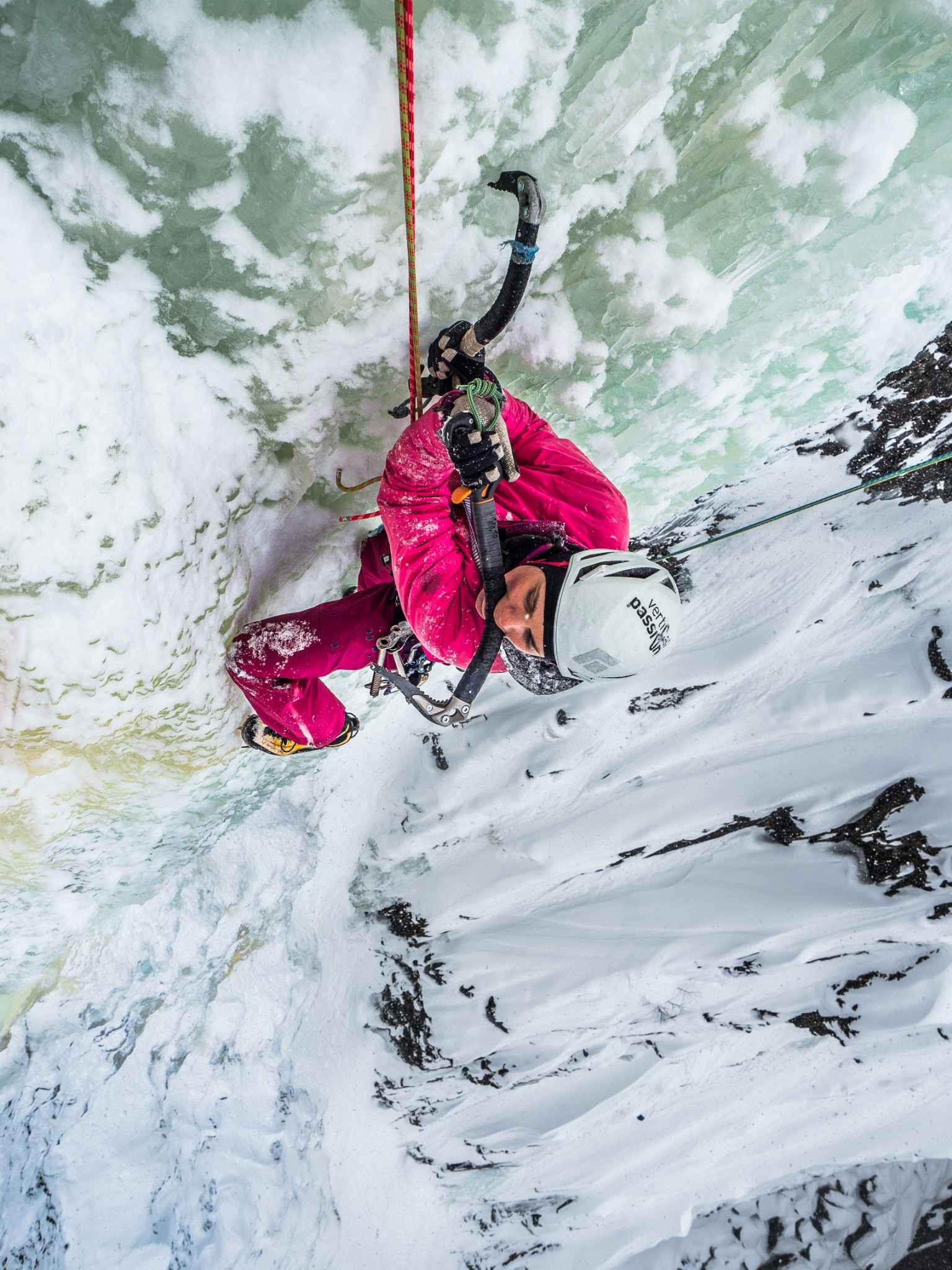
Juvsøyla (WI6), Norway

Ice climbing can take on a broad range of climbing routes. A common type of ice route is a frozen waterfall, particularly one that cascades down a mountain face or a down-mountain gully. Ice climbing routes can also take the form of high alpine snow-covered couloirs that are permanently frozen year-round. Giant icicles (also known as ice-daggers) have also been climbed as ice routes, and also as part of mixed routes; although such icicles can often dangerously break off and have been a source of several ice climber fatalities.

Ice climbing routes normally don't move beyond the sheer vertical for sustained distances due to the nature of ice (i.e. ice rarely stays in an overhanging fashion for any length of time). This means that standard ice-climbing grades broadly peak at WI6-7 (i.e. WI7 being completely sheer vertical ice and with additional risk issues). In contrast, extreme mixed-climbing routes have been developed beyond the equivalent M7-grade as they can incorporate routes that cross overhanging bare rock roofs to get to the vertical hanging icicle such as Jeff Lowe's groundbreaking Octopussy WI6 M8 in Vail, Colorado.

In Helmcken Falls in Canada, a situation arises where a perennially active waterfall keeps severely overhanging rock faces covered in thick ice, thus creating 'overhanging ice routes' of sorts. Ice climbers have established bolted routes (there is enough rock for the bolts) graded above WI7 (currently at WI13, as of 2023) in Helmcken.

== History ==
For decades, ice and mixed climbing were part of the alpine climbing skill set. During the 1960s, ambitious early ice climbers began to use pitons to climb harder ice routes but this was dangerous and very unstable. The breakthrough came in the 1960s when Yvon Chouinard designed a new wooden-handled ice axe with a curved serrated pick called the "Climax". This was followed in 1970, when Hamish MacInnes designed the all-metal aluminum alloy ice axe that had a radically dropped pick called the "Terrordactyl" (or Terror). These two ice axes revolutionized ice climbing and eventually became merged into the modern all-metal ice axe (later the ice tool) with its dropped pick but curved and serrated tip (the now familiar "banana shape").

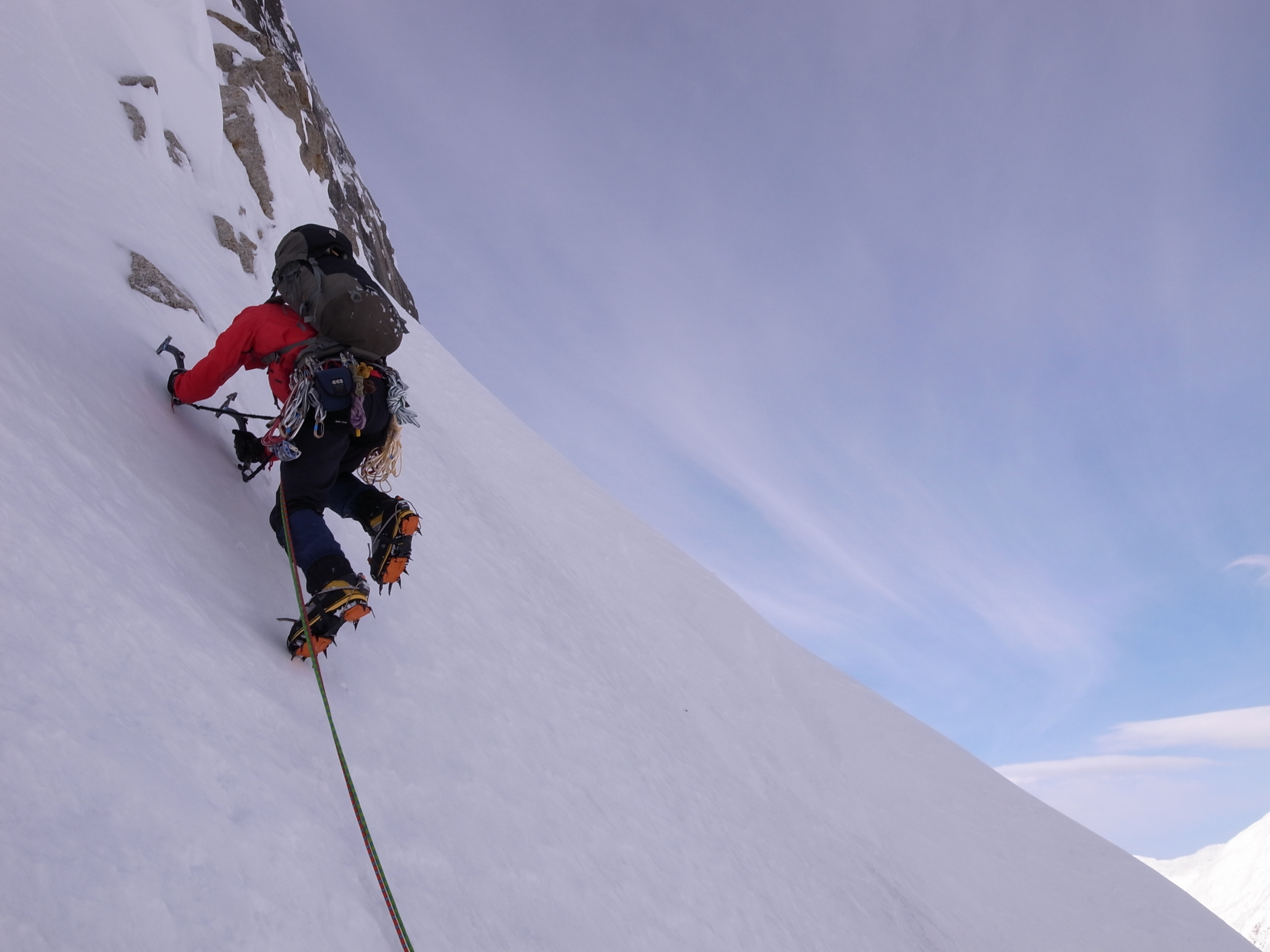
Moonflower Buttress (WI6 M7 A2), Mount Hunter Alaska

Chouinard and McInnes' ice axes would lead to an explosion of interest in climbing on frozen waterfalls in the North American Rockies and in the European Alps. In 2002, ice climber and climbing author Raphael Slawinski wrote in the American Alpine Journal: "By the early 1980s ice climbing, from being merely one of the techniques in the alpinist's arsenal, had evolved into a full-blown technical art. The skills gained on waterfalls also gave rise to a whole new generation of alpine climbs. Slipstream (WI4+, 1979) in the Canadian Rockies blurred the distinction between waterfall ice and alpine climbing; the Moonflower Buttress (WI6 M7 A2, 1983) in the Alaska Range applied the highest levels of ice climbing skill to a major alpine first ascent; and the list goes on. Waterfall ice climbing, though initially pursued for its own sake, ended up revolutionizing alpine climbing".

By the end of the 1980s, ice climbers had effectively reached the limits of what could be climbed at grade WI6-7; ultimately, the inherent tendency of the medium to hang in a vertical fashion limited the possibilities for development. It was mixed climbing that began to drive development in ice climbing as pioneers like Jeff Lowe dry-tooled bare rock overhangs and roofs to get to more radical ice features, such as hanging icicles; the culmination of which was Lowe's historic ascent of Octopussy (WI6, M8) in Vail in 1994, which lead to the birth of modern mixed climbing.

It would not be until 2010, when Tim Emmett and Will Gadd began to put up ice routes at Helmcken Falls in Canada, that ice climbing development would take a leap forward in technical development. Helmcken Fall's unique characteristics provided severely overhanging iced-routes, and in the next decade, grades were proposed up to WI13 with Mission to Mars in 2020. Emmett and Gadd consider Helmcken to be a potential Yosemite of ice climbing.

== Competition ice climbing ==
2016 Ice Climbing World Cup

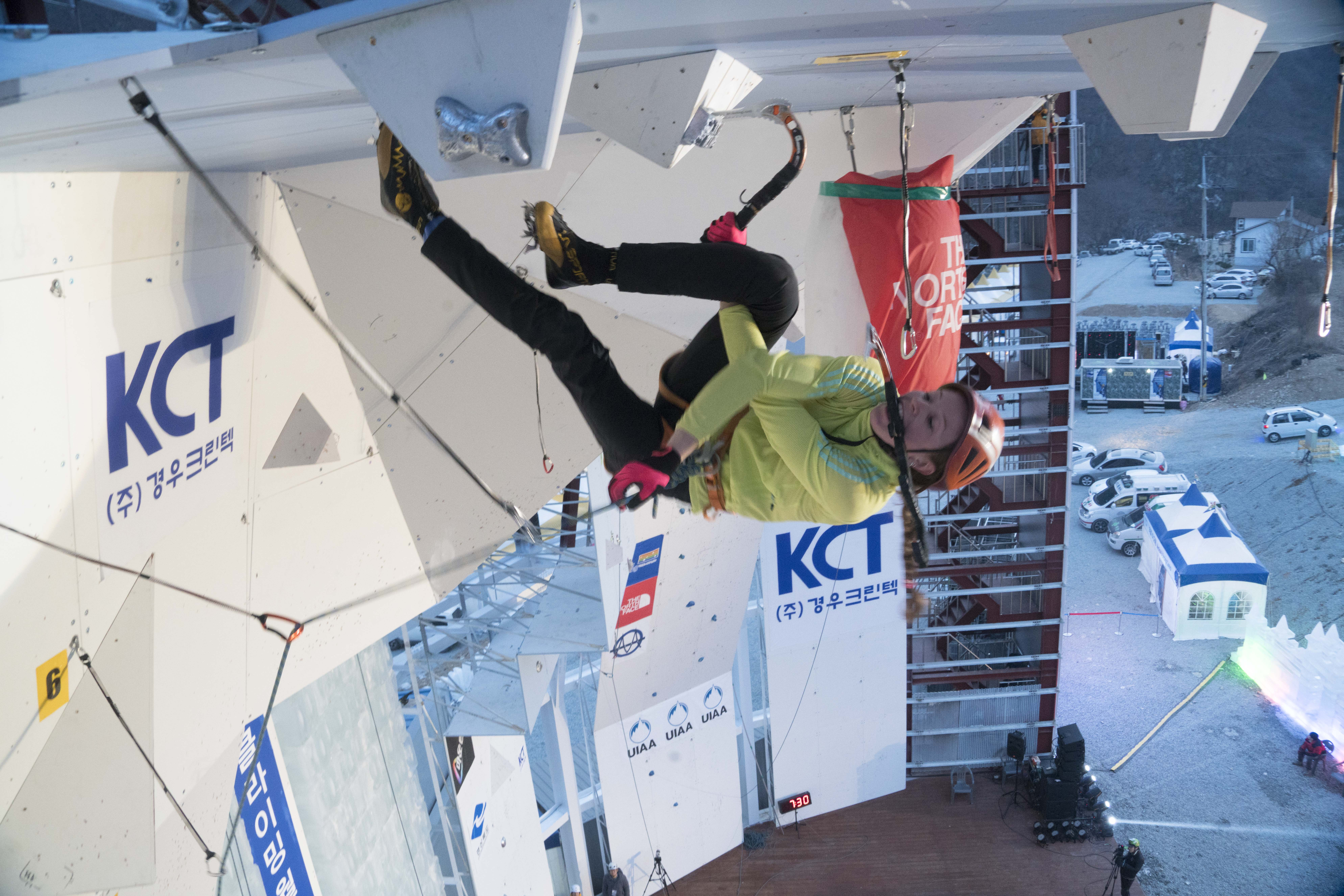
Lead ice climbing

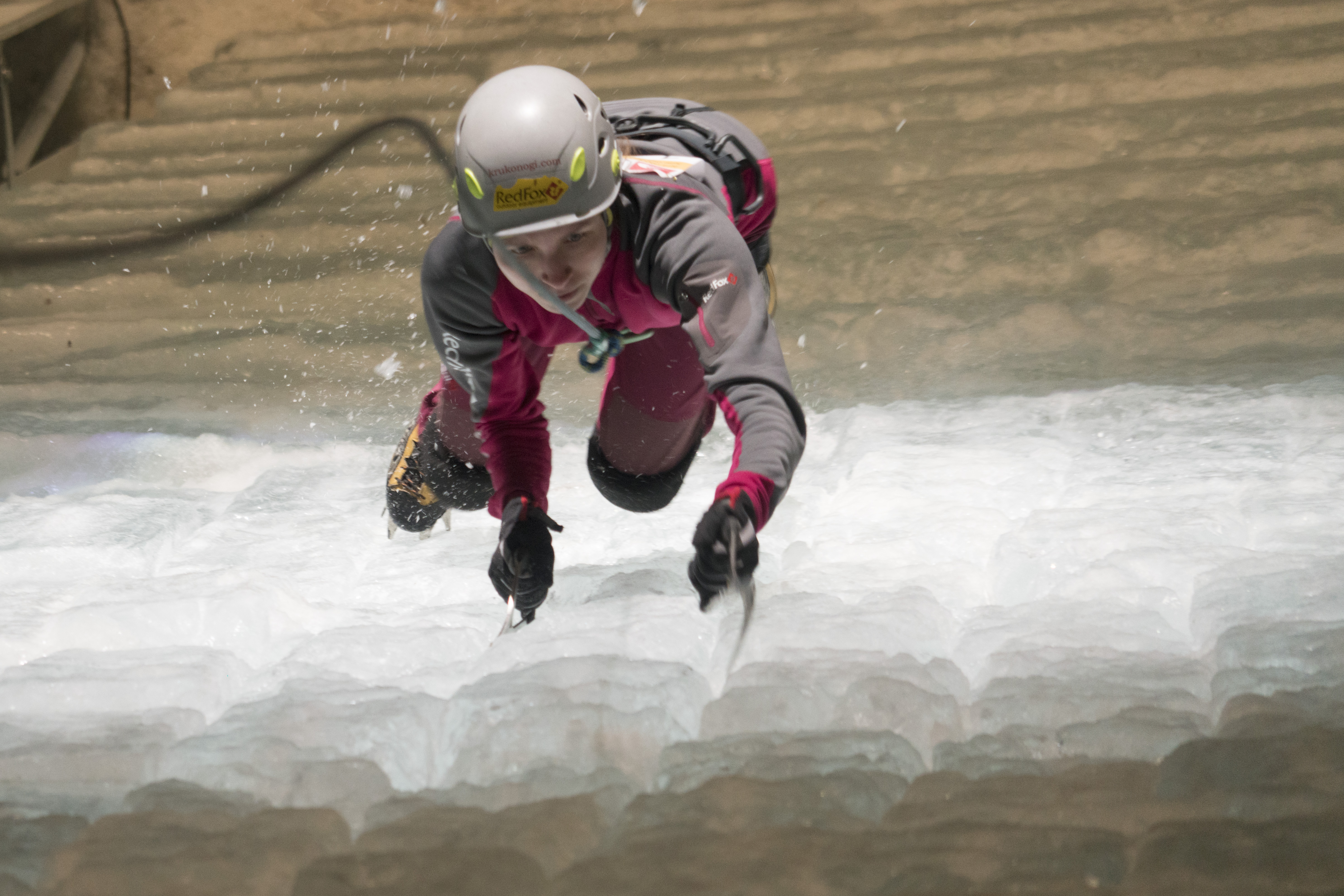
Speed ice climbing

The International Climbing and Mountaineering Federation (UIAA) has organized and regulated the sport of competition ice climbing since 2002 when the very first "Ice World Cup" (IWC) competition took place under the new UIAA rules and codes.

Amongst others, the UIAA runs two main competition ice climbing events, the annual Ice Climbing World Cup (which is run as a series of events in the year) and the bi-annual Ice Climbing World Championships (a single, once-off, competition).

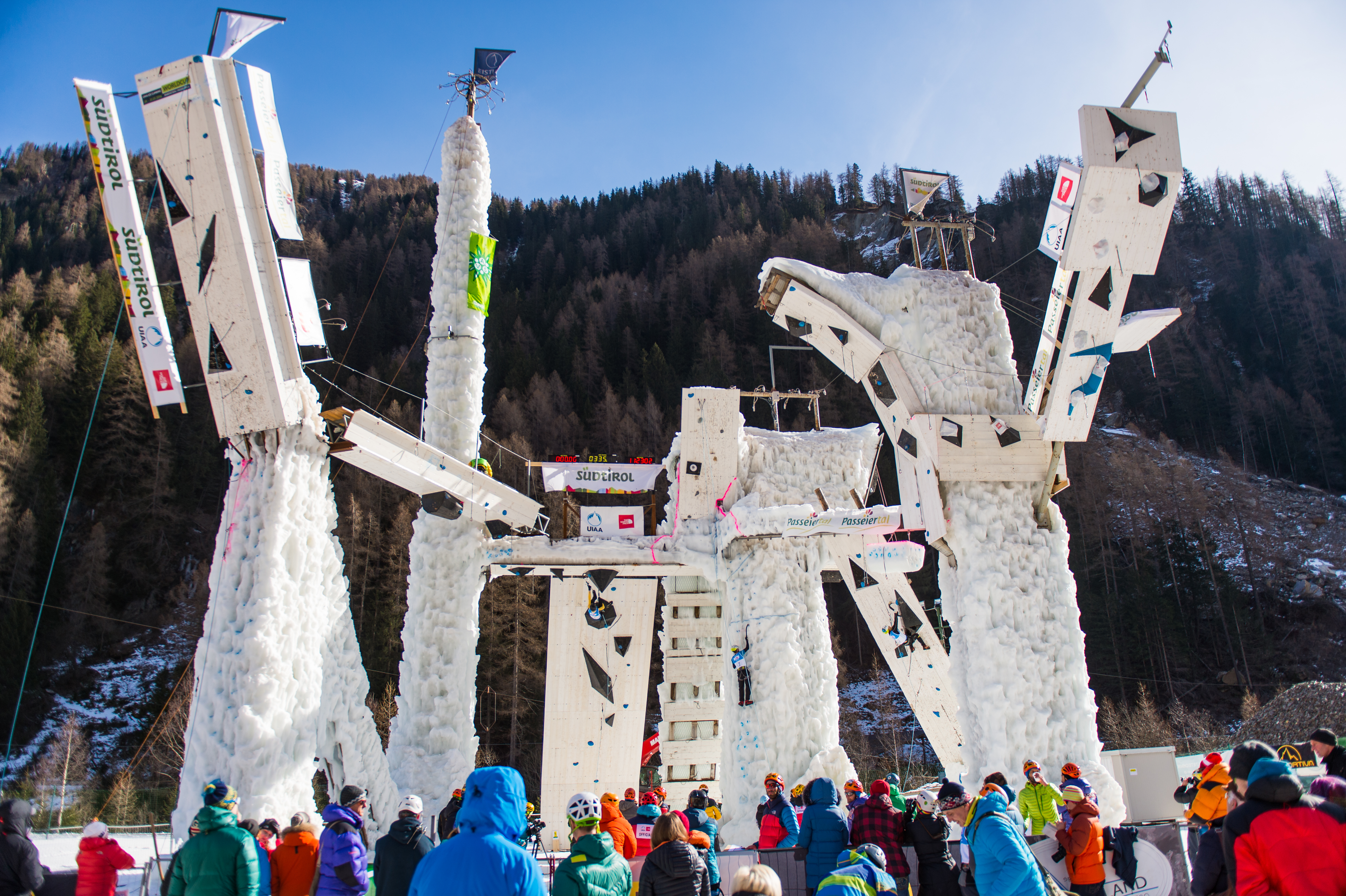
2016 UIAA Ice Climbing World Youth Championships, Italy

Most of the IWC lead climbing routes are held on bolted dry artificial surfaces and thus employ dry-tooling techniques (e.g. stein pulls and figure-four moves). In contrast, the IWC speed-climbing routes are on a standardized 40–50 ft (12–15 m) wall of ice that takes seconds for top roped ice climbers to complete (as per speed rock climbing).

Over the years, the UIAA has increased the regulation and use around competition ice climbing equipment, including the prohibition of leashes on ice tools (so they cannot be used as aid), and increased controls on the use of "heel spurs" while climbing (to counter their use for resting).

== Equipment ==
Ice climbing uses items of equipment that are common in rock climbing such as ropes, harnesses and helmets, as well as mechanical devices such as belay devices. However, the different nature of the medium means that ice climbers also use equipment that is highly specific to their type of climbing.

=== For climbing ===
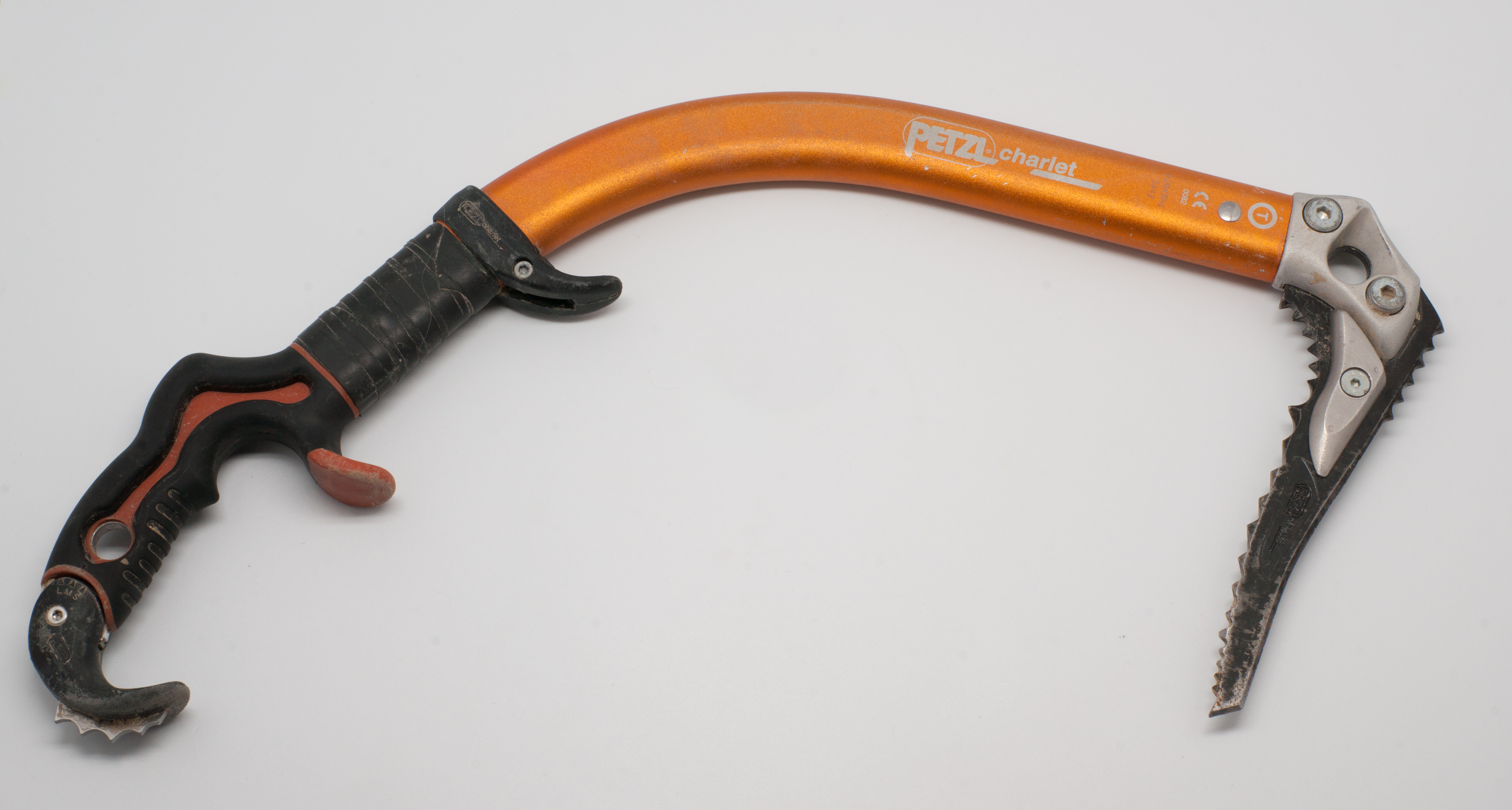
Advanced ergo ice tool

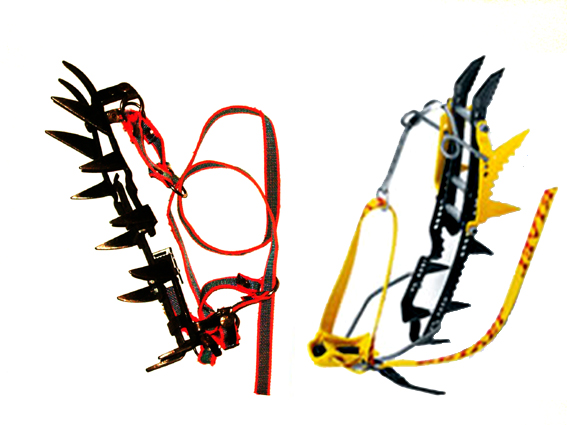
Horizontal (l), Vertical (r) crampon

- Ice axes or the more modern ice tools: Modern ice climbing requires double ice axes (or ergo ice tools); a key decision is whether it uses a leash or not. Competition ice climbing has prohibited leashes (as they can be used for aid), and most extreme mixed climbing tends not to use leashes. However, the lack of a leash means that the shock of any sudden "blowout" of the feet, can lead to an immediate fall.
- Crampons: Ice climbers often use mono-point crampons instead of the more typical dual-point crampons used by alpine climbers, to maintain greater control and cutting accuracy. Some favor the front points to be "vertical" (i.e. like a mini-ice tool), which increases cutting power but is less stable and can "blowout" without warning; others use the traditional "horizontal" (i.e. flat like an adze) front points.
- Ice boots. Ice climbers can use the "shell" or "plastic" rigid mountaineering boots used by alpine climbers, to which crampons are attached. Advanced mixed climbers, and competition ice climbers, use "fruit boots", which are light boots with crampons integrated into the sole. In addition, fruit boots can add "heel spurs", which are used in mixed climbing for overhangs.

=== For protection ===
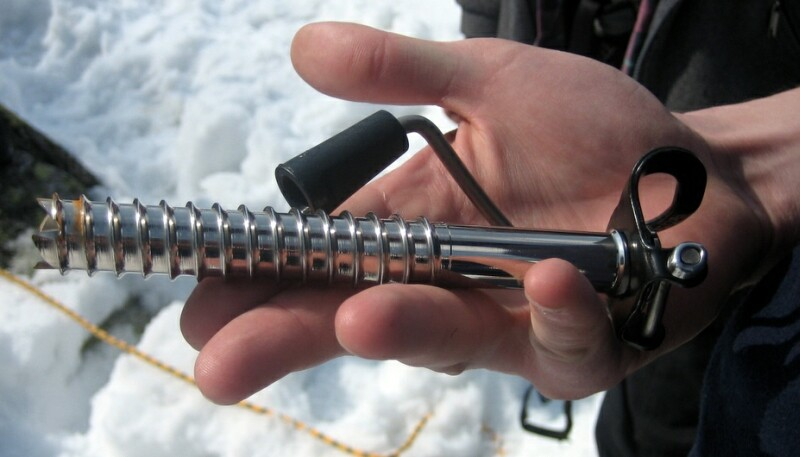
Ice screw

Where ice climbing is done as lead climbing (e.g. and not as top roping), the key piece of equipment for providing protection is the ice screw, which is a hollow metal threaded steel tube with cutting teeth on its base and a hanger eye on the opposite end. It is literally 'screwed' into the ice and its stability is dependent both on the angle and quality of its placement and the soundness of the ice. Some ice climbs, such as in Helmcken Falls (see below), and mixed and dry-tooling routes, have enough exposed rock to enable them to be bolted like sport climbs, avoiding the need for screws.

As well as ice screws, the ice itself can be used for protection, with the most common technique being the Abalakov thread (also called a V-thread or A-thread). This consists of two intersecting tunnels bored into the ice using ice screws that form a V-shaped tunnel. A sling is threaded through this tunnel and tied into a loop. The climbing rope is passed through this sling, which remains left behind after use. Because of the difficulty in construction, the common use of V-threads is for creating strong anchor points that can be used for abseiling or belaying, and not for lead climbing.

== Technique ==
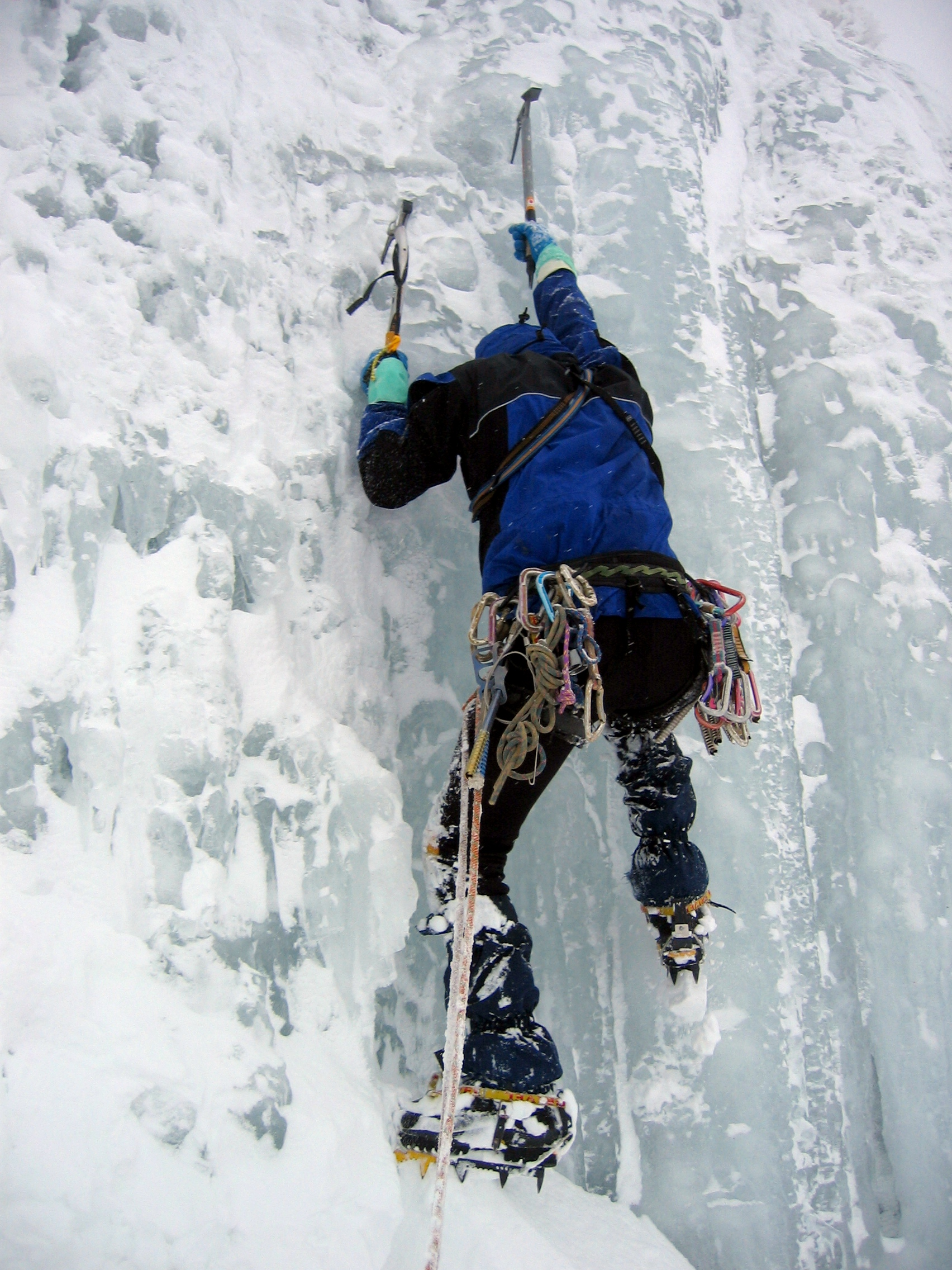
Climber with their weight on their higher axe front-pointing their right leg into the squat position.

The techniques used in ice climbing are considered to be straightforward for even a novice to understand, however, it takes experience and skill to apply them efficiently and safely. This is particularly relevant on very steep ice (i.e. at or above the grade of WI4) where inefficient technique will quickly drain the climber's energy, resulting in a potential break of the "golden rule of ice climbing", which is "don't fall".

=== Front-pointing ===
Modern ice climbing is built around the technique of front pointing, which means kicking the front spike(s) of the climber's crampon into the ice to enable the climber to ascend the face. A critical part of front-pointing is ensuring that the heels are neither elevated — as often required in rock climbing — or held too low; both scenarios which can result in the front teeth of the crampon shearing off from the ice and the climber losing their foothold(s). It is also important that the acting of kicking does not itself overly fracture the ice.

=== Squat-stand-swing ===
In moving upwards, ice climbers start from a balanced position with both feet exactly level, shoulder-width apart, and front-pointed into the ice, with the knees slightly bent forward and touching the ice.

The ice axes (or ice tools) are rarely held at the same level — which can result in a very inefficient and energy-sapping "chicken wing" action — and thus there will usually be a higher axe placed at close to maximum extension above the climber and a second one placed below it (see photo opposite).

Once the higher axe has been secured into the ice, the climber — resting their weight on the higher axe — will bring their feet up into a "squat position" until they are again level. Once the feet are secured and front-pointed into the ice, the climber will stand up straight and will start to swing with the other axe to reach the next position of maximum extension above their body. The technique has been described as "squat-stand-swing".

== Grading ==
=== WI-grades ===
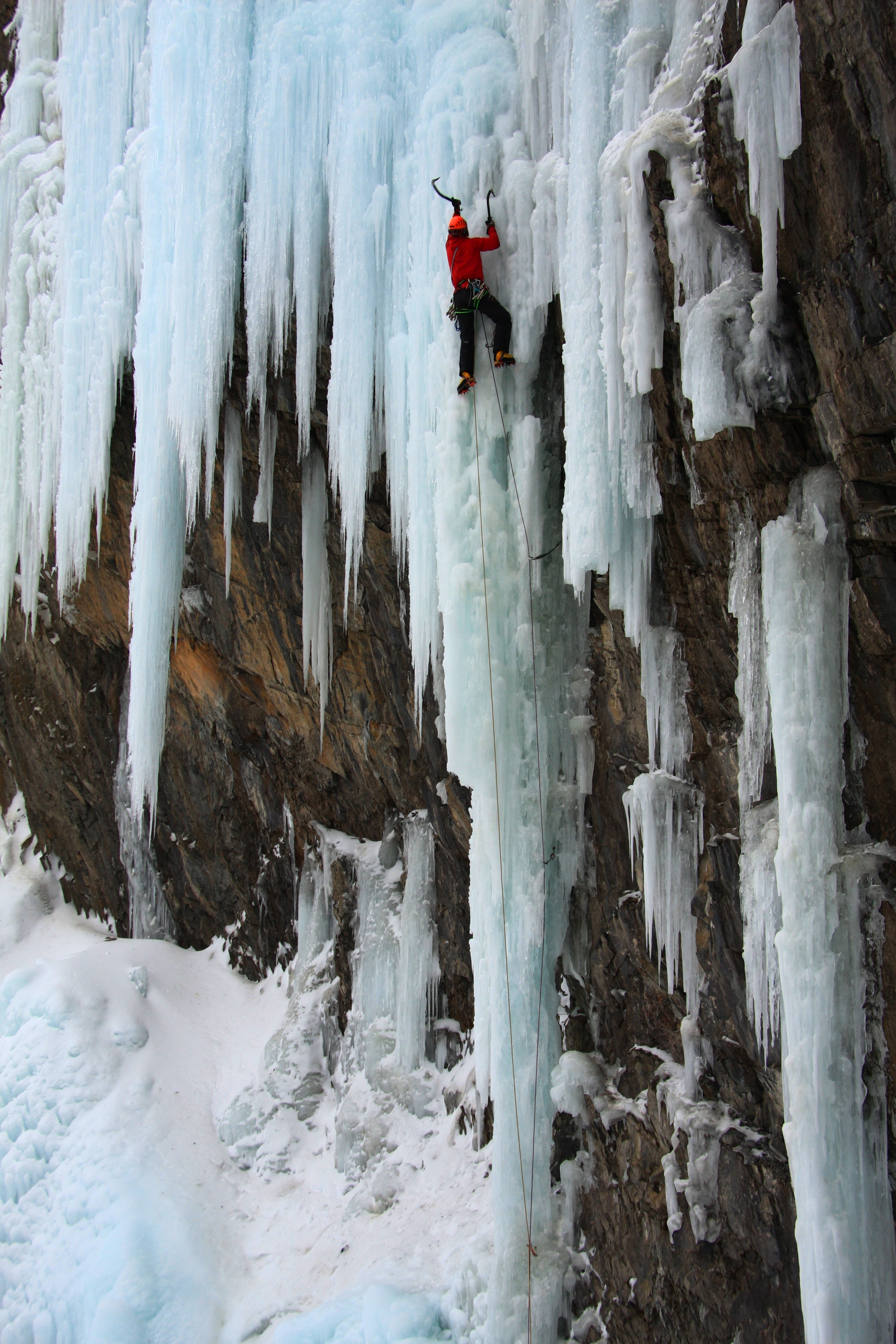
Kristoffer Szilas on Pilsner Pillar (Grade WI6), Mt Dennis, Canada

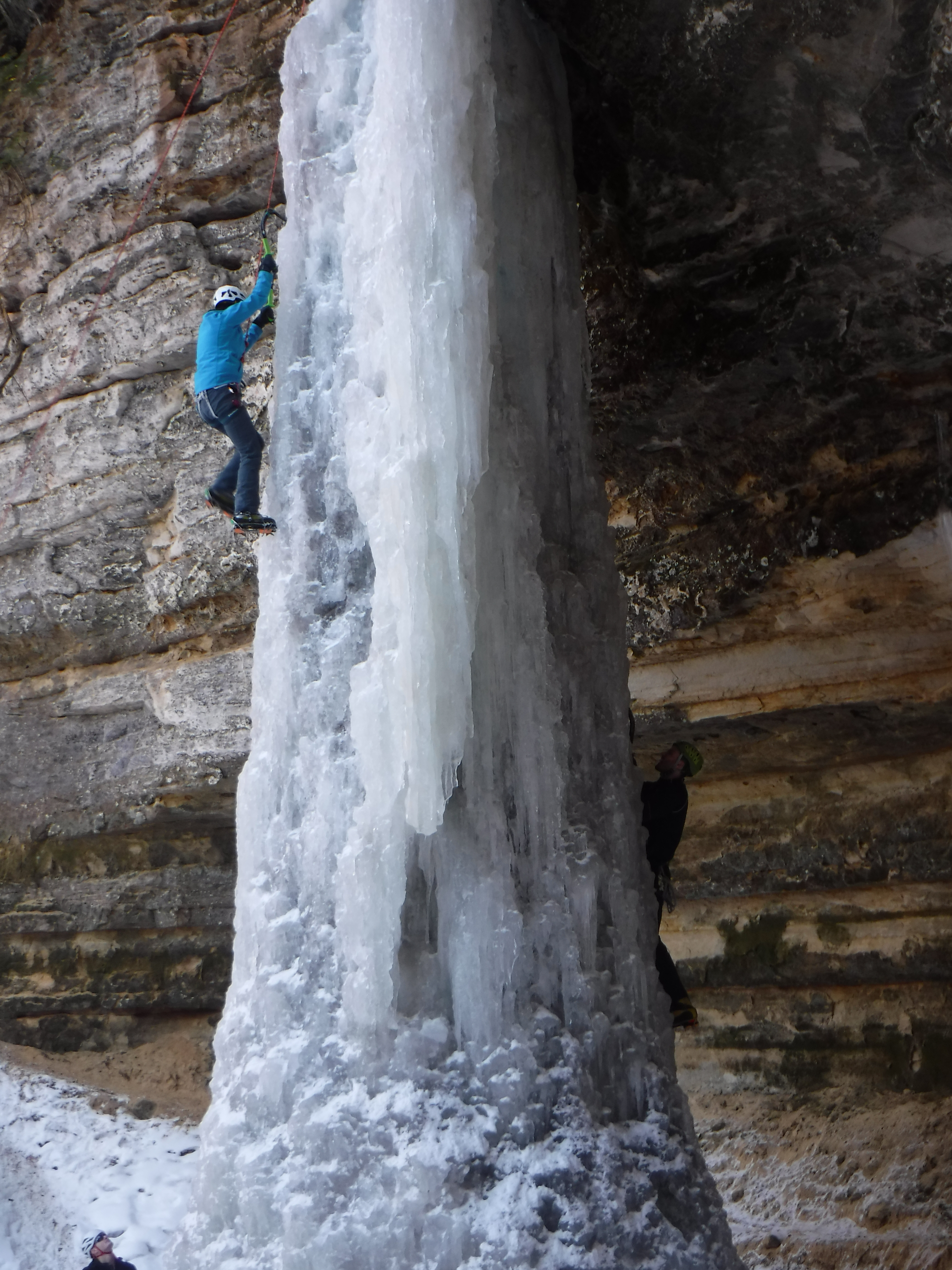
Climber on Dryer Hose (Grade WI3+), Munising, Michigan

Ice climbing uses a WI (for "water ice") grading system. WI-grades broadly equate to the mixed climbing M-grades from WI1 up to WI6, but after M6, mixed climbs become overhanging, which ice does not. WI-grades try to take some account of the difficulty of placing protection on the route but, as with M-grades, are more focused on the technical and physical challenge of the route, and are thus more akin to the French and US sport climbing grades, although as with the US system, the "R/X" suffix is used for danger.

The WI-grade is for "hard ice". Steep snow slopes, commons on alpine climbing routes, are not explicitly graded but instead, their steepest angle (approximate figure or a range) is quoted (e.g. 60–70 degree slope). WI-grade is for "seasonal" hard ice; an AI prefix is used instead for "alpine ice", which is year-round and usually firmer, more stable, making AI-grade routes slightly easier than WI routes.

In Canada, the WI prefix is sometimes dropped from the grade, and for longer multi-pitch ice routes, a "commitment grade" (a Roman numeral from I to VII) is also added to reflect the seriousness of the overall undertaking (e.g. the grade of a Canadian ice route can appear as III-5)

The following WI-grades and descriptions are provided by the American Alpine Club (republished in 2013) who note: "Ice climbing ratings are highly variable by region and are still evolving. ... The following descriptions approximate the average systems:": Additional comment is from Will Gadd.

- WI1: "Low angle, no ice tools are required". Like scrambling with 10-point crampons up a frozen river, does not require double ice axes or front-pointing skills.
- WI2: "Consistent 60º ice with possible bulges; good protection". Beginner routes can, if needed, be climbed with one ice axe; Will Gadd notes that WI2 has "more accidents than any other grade".
- WI3: "Sustained 70º with possible long bulges of 80º–90º; good rests and stances for placing screws". Gadd calls it "proper technical ice climbing needing a rope and double ice axes".
- WI4: "Continuous 80º ice fairly long sections of 90º ice broken up by occasional rests". According to Gadd, "Strong novices can top rope WI4, but leading WI4 is serious".
- WI5: "Long and strenuous, with a rope length of 85º–90º ice offering few good rests; or a shorter pitch of thin or bad ice with protection that’s difficult to place".
- WI6: "A full rope length of near-90º ice with no rests, or a shorter pitch more tenuous than WI5. Highly technical". Gadd says "the best climbers will find an occasional reason to retreat at WI6".
- WI7: "As per [WI6] above, but on thin poorly bonded ice or long, overhanging poorly adhered columns. Protection is impossible or very difficult to place and of dubious quality". Gadd calls WI7, "Semi-mythical", and "with a high publicity co-efficient, that often becomes a WI6 on repeat". In 2023, Climbing magazine wrote that leading Canadian ice climbers such as Quentin Roberts and Marc-André Leclerc had publicly stated that pure WI7 grades could not exist in nature.
- WI8: "Under discussion". According to Gadd, "only claimed a few times", and "either bad gear and bad ice", or "an overhanging glacial serac that is like an M8 in physicality".

=== Helmcken routes ===
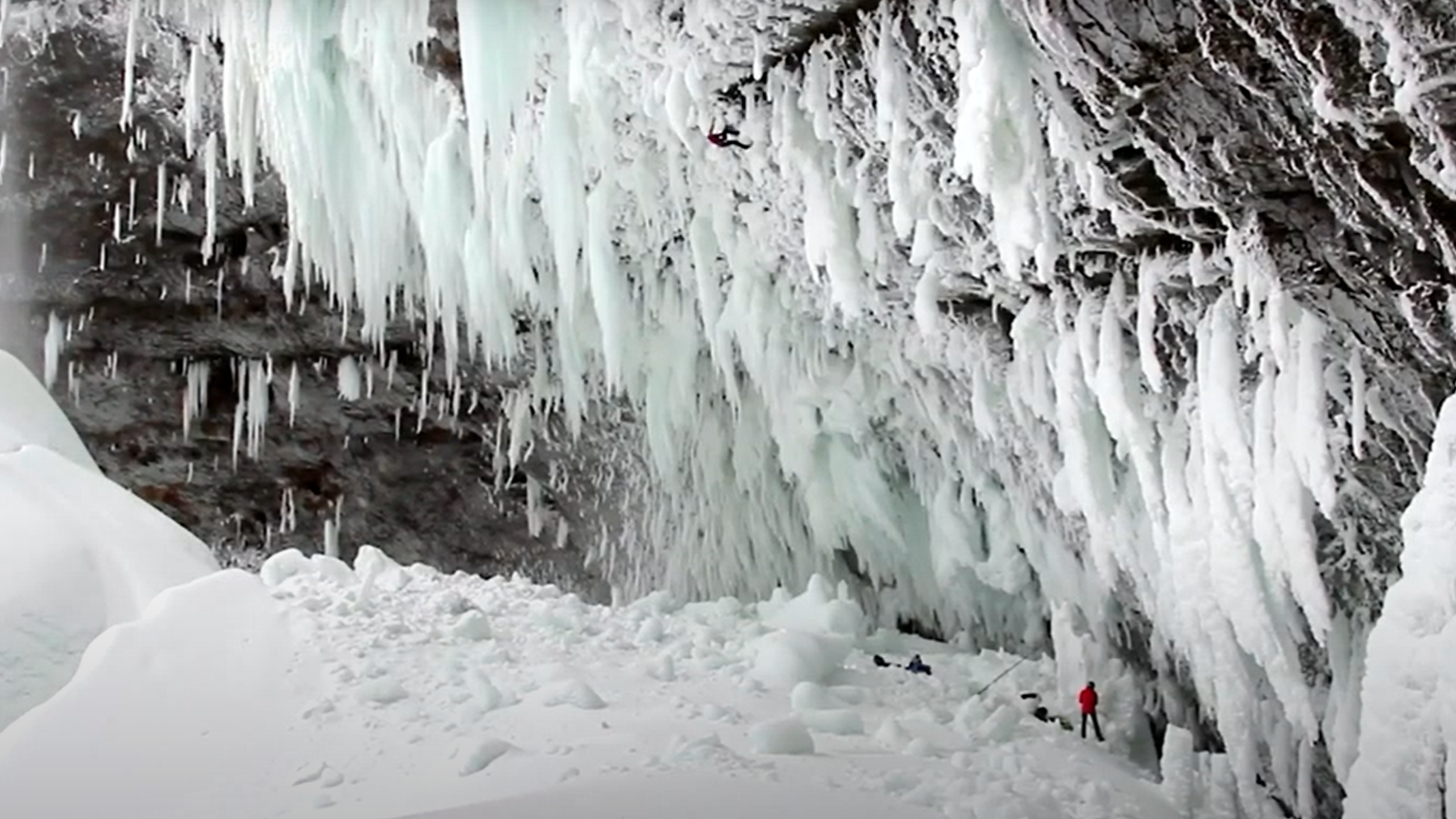
Angelika Rainer high up on the severely overhanging Clash of Titans (WI10+), Helmcken Falls.

In 2010, ice climbers Tim Emmett and Will Gadd created routes at Helmcken Falls in Canada with unique characteristics. Unlike WI7 ice routes that rarely overhang, these routes were significantly overhanging like extreme M-graded routes. This was due to the intense spray from the active waterfall, which covered the overhanging rock in ice so that there was little dry-tooling, with all the movements on hard ice.

These routes were also bolted like M-grade climbs (a metal detector is used to find the bolts), so Emmett and Gadd linked used M-grades as a guide on their WI-grade. These new routes laid claim to being the new "world's technically hardest ice climbing routes", starting with Spray On at WI10 in 2010, Wolverine at WI11 in 2011, Interstellar Spice at WI12 in 2016, and Mission to Mars at WI13 in 2020.

There has been debate in the ice climbing world around whether Helmcken-WI routes are M-grade climbs. In 2023, British ice climber Neil Gresham said that Helmcken routes are "definitely harder" than WI7 routes and that a confident M-climber will take time to adjust to the Helmcken WI-equivalent.

Emmett has described Helmcken as the ice climbing equivalent of Yosemite, and it has attracted some of the world's best ice climbers.

=== M-grades ===
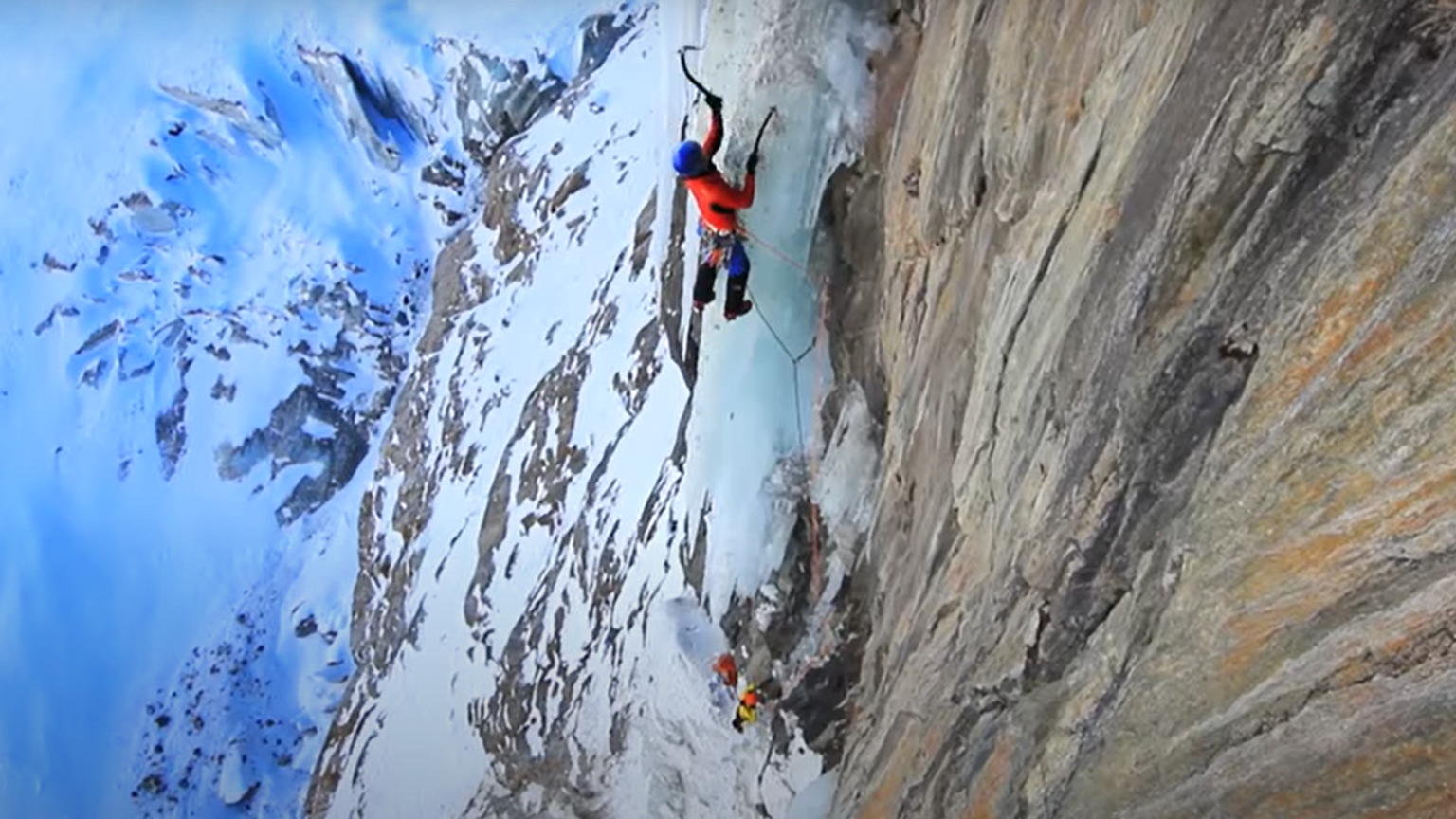
Pak Hi-jong on Tequila Stuntman (M7 WI6) in Chamonix, France

When ice climbing is done as mixed climbing (i.e. there are both ice and bare rock sections), a separate M-grading grading system is used, which goes from M1, M2, M3, ..... , M13, M14, etc.

=== D-grades ===
When ice climbing is done as dry-tooling, which is ice climbing on bare rock, the M-grade is replaced by a "D" prefix to denote a pure 'dry-tooling' route, however, the systems are otherwise identical.

== Evolution of grade milestones ==
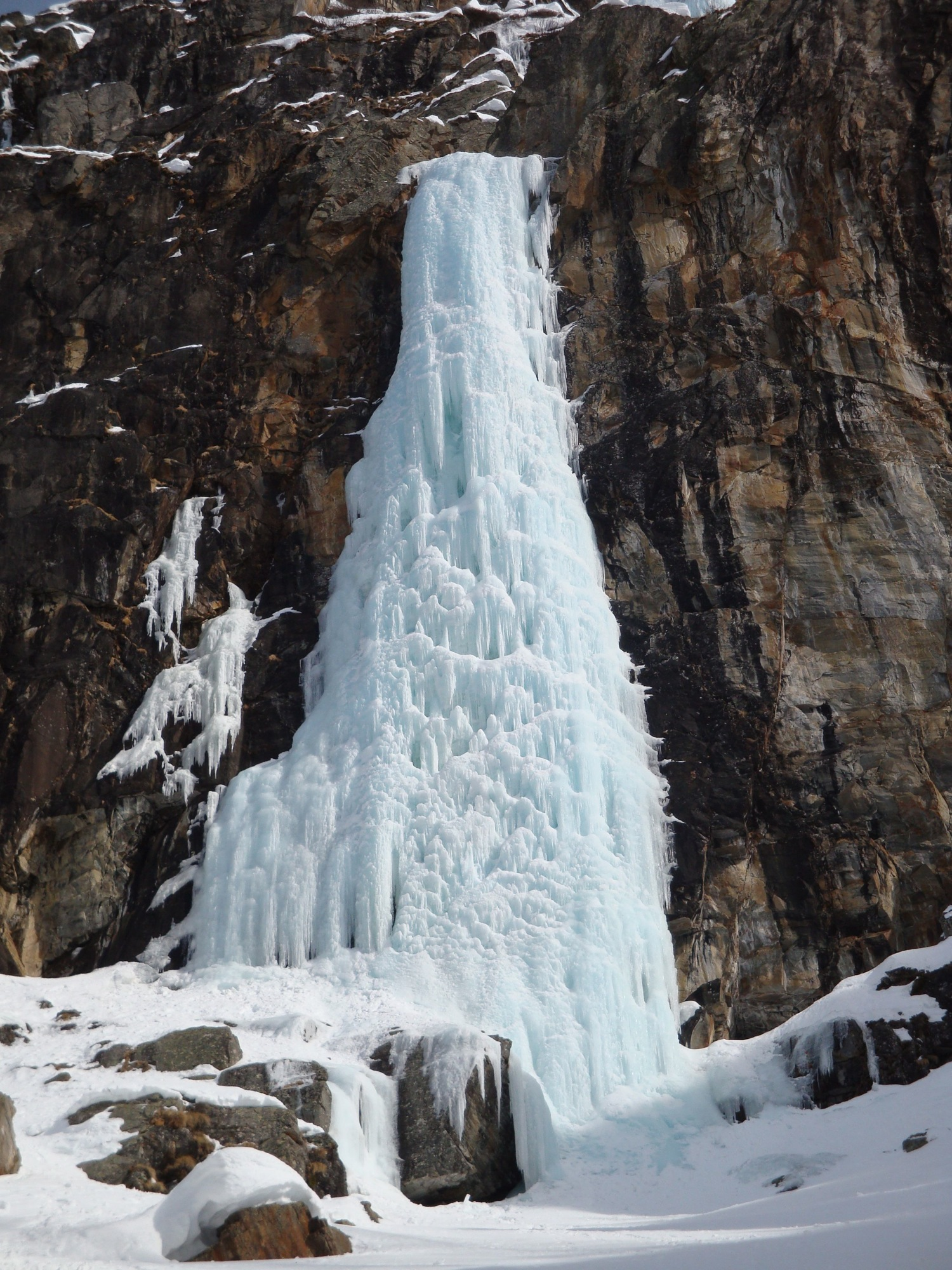
Repentance Super WI5-6 Val di Cogne, Italy

The following ice climbs are particularly notable in the evolution of ice climbing grade milestones and ice climbing standards from being a skill used by alpine climbing to a standalone sport in its own right:

- 1979. Slipstream WI4+ Canadian Rockies. First ascent was in 1979 by Jim Elzinga and John Lauchlan; considered an important early example of the blurring between alpine climbing and pure ice climbing and the first major alpine, serac waterfall route in the Rockies.
- 1983. Gimme Shelter WI6 Canadian Rockies. First ascent was in 1983 by Kevin Doyle and Tim Friesen; considered an early WI7 contender in ice climbing, and the hardest ice route at the time; grade since softened to WI6.
- 1987. Riptide WI6-7 Canadian Rockies. First ascent was in 1987 by Larry Ostrander and Jeff Marshall; considered an early WI7 contender in ice climbing, and the hardest ice route at the time; grade since softened to WI6+.
- 1988. Reality Bath WI7 X Canadian Rockies. First ascent was in 1988 by Mark Twight and Randy Rackliff; never been repeated and described by Albi Sole in the Canadian Rockies guide book as "so dangerous as to be of little value except to those suicidally inclined"; possibly first-ever WI7.
- 1989. Repentance Super WI5-6 Val di Cogne, Italy. First ascent was in 1989 by a non-local team of François Damilano, Gian Carlo Grassi, and Fulvio Conta; considered the hardest ice climb in Europe at the time and a breakthrough in standards; mostly bolted now and grade softened.
- 2002. Rites of Passage WI7+ Mount Kitchener, Canadian Rockies. First ascent was in 2002 by Eric Dumerac and Philippe Pellet; initially graded WI8, but considered one of the few routes that are truly above WI7 (pre-Helmcken Falls), and the hardest route in the world at the time.
- 2010. Centrecourt WI7+ Gasteinertal, Austria. First ascent was in 2010 by Albert Leichtfried and Benedikt Purner; considered one of the hardest routes in the world at the time and another of the few ice climbing routes at WI7+.

The grade milestones at Helmcken Falls are as follows:

- 2010. Spray On WI10. First ascent by Tim Emmett and Will Gadd at Helmcken Falls; first-ever WI10 in ice climbing; bolted.
- 2011. Wolverine WI11. First ascent by Tim Emmett and Klemen Premrl at Helmcken Falls; first-ever WI11 in ice climbing; bolted.
- 2016. Interstellar Spice WI12. First ascent by Tim Emmett and Klemen Premrl at Helmcken Falls; first-ever WI12 in ice climbing; bolted.
- 2020. Mission to Mars WI13. First ascent by Tim Emmett and Klemen Premrl at Helmcken Falls; first-ever WI13 in ice climbing; bolted.

=== Free solo ===
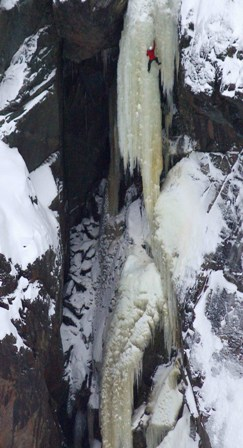
Climber free soloing the famous Lipton (WI7), in Rjukan, Norway

A number of ice climbers have set new grade milestones in a free solo climbing style (e.g. no climbing protection such as ice screws, but ice axes and crampons are allowed):

- 1997. Sea of Vapours WI6+ Canadian Rockies. Free solo in 1997 by Guy Lacelle. Sea of Vapours was considered WI7+ at the time.
- 2017. Beta Block Super WI7 Breitwangfluh, Switzerland. Free solo in 2017 by Dani Arnold.

== In film ==
A number of notable climbing films have been made that feature ice climbing, including:

- The Alpinist, a 2021 documentary film about the late Canadian alpinist Marc-André Leclerc, featuring his free solo ascent of several ice routes
- Touching the Void, a 2003 docudrama about a famous alpine climbing rescue in the Peruvian Andes

== See also ==
- Alpine climbing
- Dry-tooling
- Mixed climbing
