= Tom Ballard (climber) =

British rock climber and alpinist (1988–2019)

- Ballard before losing contact with the Nanga Parbat team

Personal information
- Born: 16 October 1988 Belper, Derbyshire, England
- Died: 24 February – 9 March 2019 (aged 30) Nanga Parbat, Gilgit-Baltistan, Pakistan
- Parent: Alison Hargreaves

Climbing career
- Type of climber: Alpine, greater ranges, mixed, dry-tooling, traditional
- First ascents: A line above the sky (D15), Dolomites
- Known for: First solo winter ascent of the six major alpine north faces in a single season

Tom Ballard (born 16 October 1988; died 24 February – 9 March 2019) was a British rock climber and alpinist, who was the first mountaineer to climb the six major alpine north faces solo in a single winter season. In February 2019, Ballard disappeared during bad weather on an expedition to Nanga Parbat, in Gilgit-Baltistan, Pakistan. His body was discovered on the mountain's Mummery Spur on 9 March 2019.

== Early life ==
Ballard was born in Belper, Derbyshire, in 1988, the son of mountaineers Jim Ballard and Alison Hargreaves, who achieved fame both as the first female solo ascensionist of Mount Everest, and for completing the first solo ascents of the six alpine north faces in a single summer season. His mother died in a climbing accident on K2 on 13 August 1995. Ballard also had one sister, Kate.

In 1995, Ballard's family moved near to Fort William, Inverness-shire, before relocating to the Alps in 2009, and then Val di Fassa in the Dolomites. In Val di Fassa he met his fiancée Stefania Pederiva, daughter of alpine guide Bruno Pederiva.

== Climbing career ==
From an early stage, Ballard began creating new rock climbing, mixed climbing and alpine routes in the Alps, the Dolomites, and in the Himalayas. He climbed a new rock route on the Eiger in 2009, naming it "Seven Pillars of Wisdom," and completed the first solo climb of the Eiger winter route "Piola-Sprungli" in 2010. This was followed in 2013 by a first free ascent in winter of "Olimpia – going for gold" on Catinaccio in the Dolomites, and a new route on the Agassizhorn in the Bernese Oberland that he named "If Gengis can, we can!".

From December 2014 to March 2015, during a project known as "Starlight and Storms", Ballard climbed the six major Alpine north faces (the Cima Grande di Lavaredo, the Piz Badile, the Matterhorn, the Grandes Jorasses, the Petit Dru and the Eiger) solo, being the first person to complete this feat in a single winter season without a support team. A film chronicling this project, Tom, won several awards at international film festivals.

In 2016, Ballard established several new rock, mixed and dry tool routes. He established a new 26-pitch rock climb "Dirty Harry" on the northwest face of Civetta, and a new mixed route "Titanic" on the north face of the Eiger. He also created what was at the time the world's hardest dry-tooling climb, "A line above the sky," in the Dolomites. He attempted the previously unclimbed North East face of Link Sar in Pakistan with Italian climber Daniele Nardi in 2017, but failed to reach the top.

== Disappearance and death on Nanga Parbat ==
In 2019, whilst climbing together again, Nardi and Ballard disappeared during bad weather on an expedition to Nanga Parbat. The last communication with the climbers was made on 24 February. Approximately 148,000 euros were raised by friends to fund a search mission. The rescue attempt, which began on 28 February, involved high-altitude drones, helicopters, and mountaineers on foot, but was hampered by heavy snowfall and the military standoff between Pakistan and India. Although a three-person tent was spotted on the first day of the search, it was not clear if it belonged to Ballard and Nardi. The search on 6 March was called off without the pair being found.

The following day, Basque climber Alex Txikon, continuing the search, spotted the outline of two bodies in the rocky part of the Mummery Spur on the mountain. After Txikon sent photographs to the families, to Agostino Da Polenza, an Italian climber who had been coordinating the search on behalf of the Nardi family, and to Italian ambassador Stefano Pontecorvo, it was agreed that the figures were very probably Nardi and Ballard, and certainly an avalanche had to be ruled out.

On 9 March 2019, it was confirmed that the bodies of Ballard and Nardi had been found "in a place that was difficult to reach but everything possible would be done to try and recover them." Footage of the bodies was published by Ambassador Stefano Pontecorvo and Alex Txikon with the permission of the families.

In September 2021 the BBC broadcast the 110-minute documentary The Last Mountain, directed by Chris Terrill, about Ballard's life and death.

== Filmography ==
Year	Name	Director(s)	Production	Awards
1996	Alison's Last Mountain	Chris Terrill		
2015	Tom	Angel Esteban; Elena Golatelli	KOTTOMfilms; Ruggero Arena productions	Best Mountaineering Film, Kendal Mountain Festival 2015: Special Jury Prize, Bansko Mountain Film Fest 2015; Youth Jury Prize, Bansko 2014; Honourable Mention, Gorniskega Festival 2016; Special Mention, Sheffield Adventure Film Festival 2016; Special Mention, Dutch Film Festival 2016; Best Mountaineering Film, Cervino Cinemountain 2016; Grand Jury Prize, Best Mountaineering Film, EHO Mountain Film Fest 2016; Best Mountaineering Film and Jury Prize, Autrans Film Festival 2016
2021	The Last Mountain	Chris Terrill	Uppercut Films Dorothy Street Pictures Globus Pictures	
