= Ice tool =

Specialised modern ice axe

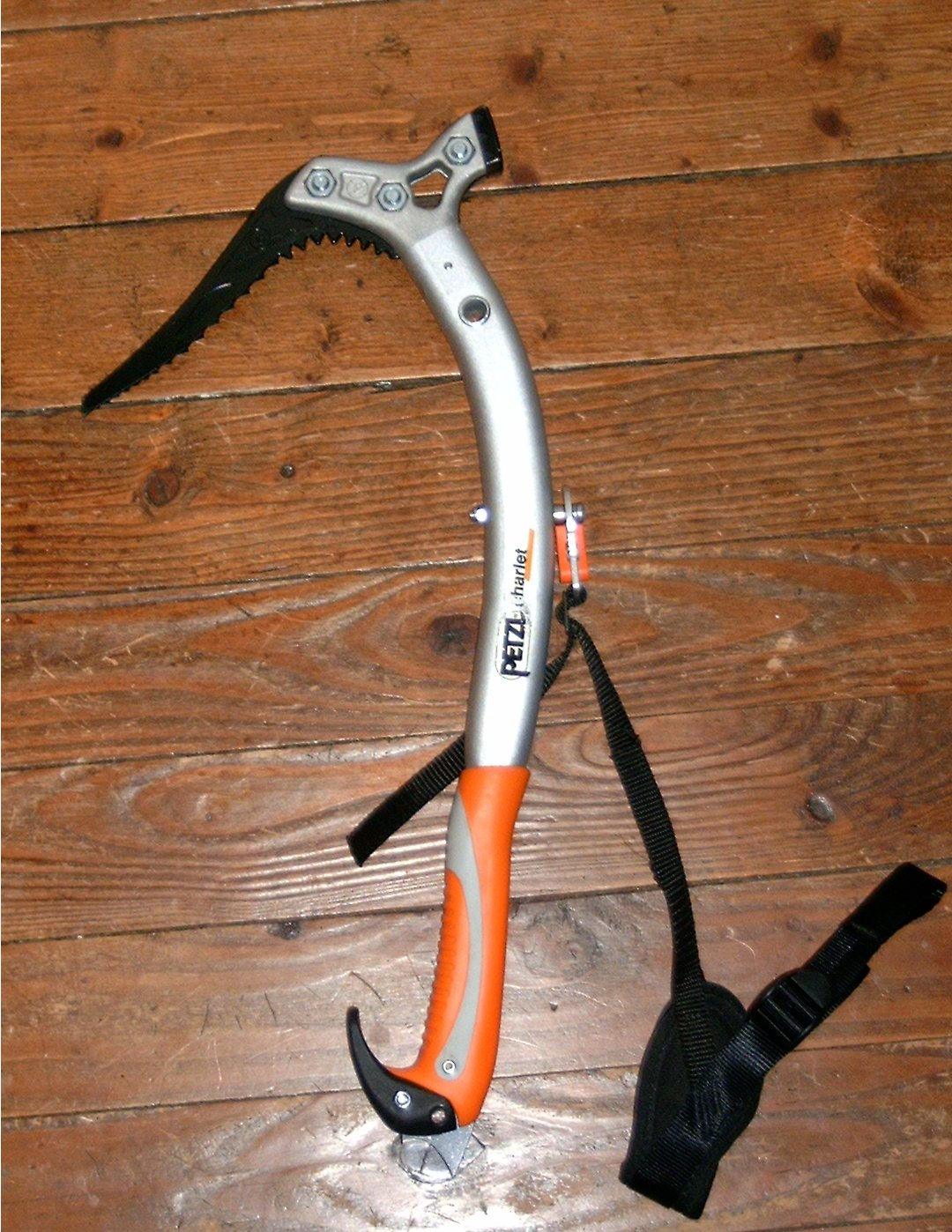
An ice tool with hammer fitted

An ice tool is a specialized elaboration of the modern ice axe, and often described broadly as an ice axe or technical axe, used in modern ice climbing and mixed climbing. Modern ice climbers usually use them in pairs when ascending an ice climbing route, and thus in some circumstances such as top-rope-anchored climbs, a pair may be shared among two or more people, where only one of them at a time is climbing. In contrast a classical "ice axe" is used by one person for the hours or days a party is traveling across snow or glacier. In communities where it is common to refer to an "ice tool" simply as an "ice axe", classic "ice axes" are often referred to as "traveling axes", "walking axes", or "general mountaineering axes" to distinguish them from "tools".

In climbing of vertical ice, two tools are needed in order for the climber (supported by cramponed feet) to use each tool in turn in maintaining balance with the body's center of mass nearly straight above the toes, while repositioning the other tool to a higher level, before raising the body weight with the legs and thereby setting the stage for repeating the process.

== Types ==
=== Traditional ice tools ===
Historically the most common type of ice tool uses a specialized leash that snugly grips the climber's wrist. The length of the leash is adjusted so that when a climber hangs on a leash their hand remains at the tool's handle portion of the axe shaft. This allows the climber to rest on the axe placement by applying minimal grip to the axe shaft. The greatest disadvantage to a leashed tool is the potential to become stuck on the tool in the rest position without the ability to reach the grip and control the tool

=== Leashless ice tools ===
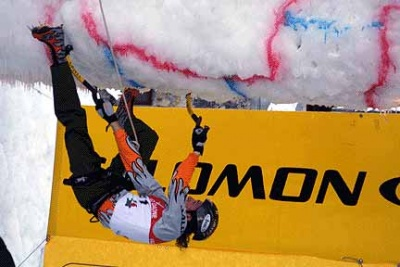
Ice Climbing Competition. Italy, Val Daone, 2007.

More recently leashless ice tools have emerged. Most modern ice tools are curved in such a way that the shaft of the ice axe is not vertical when actively placed. Gripping a shaft slightly canted from vertical is usually much less tiring than gripping a vertical shaft. Leashless ice tools further adjust the cant and its position relative to the main shaft to maximize the comfort and control of the axe. These changes as well as the introduction of finger rests rendered it much easier to grip and hold the axe handle negating much of the "rest" value of leashes.

The disadvantages of leashless tools are the climber's inability to "rest" on their wrists and the potential for dropping a tool en route. Advantages of leashless tools while climbing include the ability to swap tools between hands (or cross and match) plus a climber's ability to move their hands to any part of the tool unrestricted by the leash. A safety advantage is that a climber can not become stuck on their leashes without the ability to reach the tools. This safety feature as well as an effort to make the routes more difficult motivated UIAA to ban leashes during competition. This ban spurred the development of commercial manufactured leashless tools.

Leashless tools are now often used in conjunction with a 'springer leash' system. This gives some protection against dropping the tools on a long trad route but still gives most of the flexibility of going leashless. Each tool is clipped to a bungee cord that terminates on the climber's waist usually clipping to their harness. Wrists are not supported and freedom of movement is still maintained. The springer leash is not designed to arrest a fall should the ice axe remain in place, however this is often what can happen in real-life usage.

=== Modified traditional tools ===
Many traditional tools are now sold with finger rests or are designed for the easy addition of finger rests. These tools are intended to function with or without leashes.

== Design ==
An ice tool being placed

The physical designs of ice tools differ more widely than those of other ice axes.

- Modular: Ice tools are extremely modular; Most have the ability to change picks and adze/hammer. Many ice tools are designed to accommodate shaft modifications to change the position of a hand while hanging. This is distinct from mountaineering ice axes which are usually produced as a single axe, adze, and shaft component with limited variation in leashes.
- Pick variations: Most ice-tool picks are flat, with a (shaftward) "drooping" direction and a serrated lower edge, but some of these are straight or concave on their upper edges, instead of convex as other ice axes are. With the same kind of design, picks may vary in degree, as to number of teeth, depth of teeth, or thickness, and some are field replaceable, to deal with point damage or to accommodate more than one pick design on the same tool. There are also ice tools with round tubular-nosed, instead of flat, picks.
- Adze-end variations: As with non-ice-tool adzes, those of ice tools vary in several aspects; other ice tools have a hammer head in place of the adze, or are modular, permitting switching styles of adze or hammer, and/or between adze and hammer.
- Shaft variations: Shafts may be straight, as with shafts of non-ice-tool axes, or have one or two bends or curved sections. Ice tools generally range from 40–60 cm (16–24 in) in length, with 50 cm (20 in) being by far the most common length.
- Spike variations: Non-ice-tool spikes are generally flat and symmetrical, with straight or convex edges meeting at a point. Ice-tool spikes vary widely, including also asymmetrical flat shapes with teeth on one side or two points of different lengths, conical or oval tubular ends, or slightly hooked ends. Many "leashless" ice tools have abandoned the spike altogether and end with a smooth handle.
- Indoor Ice tool: Ice tools are now available for training indoors at the local climbing wall. They follow the leashless design principle with dual position grip but have a rubber strap instead of a steel spike at the end of the shaft. This design allows them to be used on the existing climbing wall alongside other climbers without causing any damage and without any changes having to be made.

== See also ==
- Ice axe
- Ice climbing
- Dry-tooling
