= The Last Mountain (2021 film) =

- Directed by: Chris Terrill
- Produced by: Olivia Lichtenstein, Julia Nottingham
- Production companies: Uppercut Films; Dorothy St. Pictures; Globus Pictures
- Distributed by: BBC Factual
- Release date: 26 September 2021 (London)
- Running time: 105 minutes

The Last Mountain is a 2021 mountain film co-produced by the BBC about the death of Tom Ballard on Nanga Parbat. The film follows the earlier documentary Alison's Last Mountain (1996) about the death of his mother Alison Hargreaves twenty-four years earlier on her descent from her second unaided summit of K2.

The documentary received critical acclaim and won Best Mountain Film at the 2019 Kendal Mountain Festival.
