= Ice screw =

Protection anchor for ice climbing

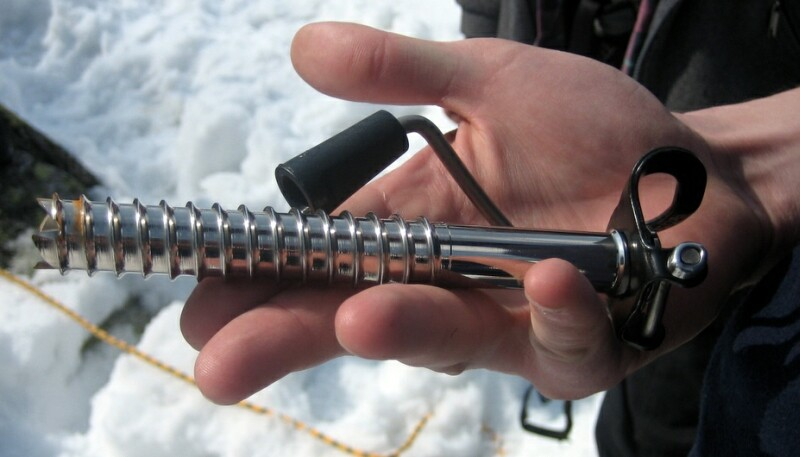
An ice screw. Some modern screws like this one now have a handle to assist entry and removal, whereas early models did not.

An ice screw is a threaded tubular screw used as a running belay or anchor by climbers on steep ice surfaces such as steep waterfall ice or alpine ice during ice climbing or crevasse rescue, to hold the climber in the event of a fall, and at belays as anchor points.

== Design ==
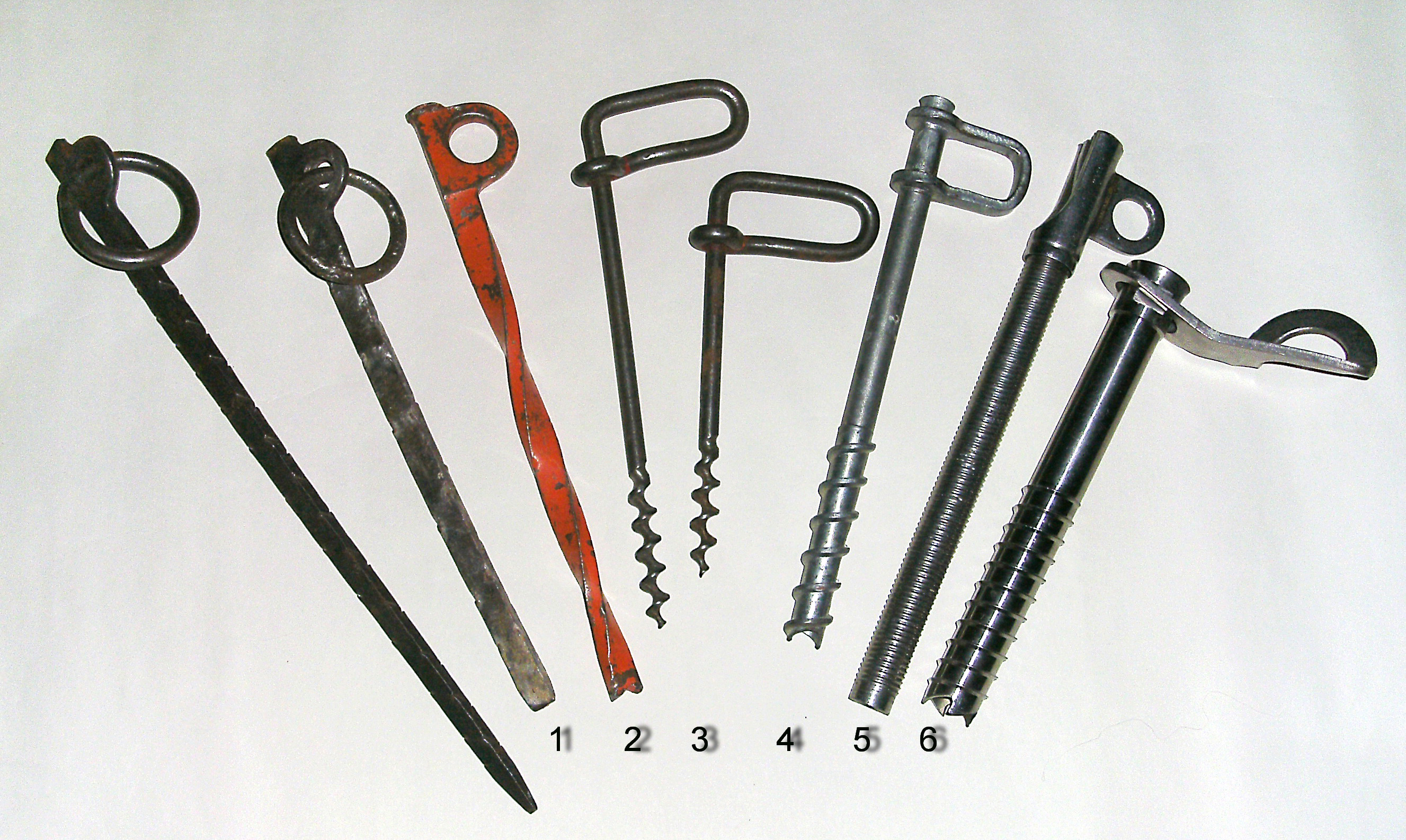
Development of ice screws for the period 1924-2000

Ice screws may come with one or more of the following: an in-built or separate ratchet mechanism to speed up placement, conical centre-hole to aid removal of ice cores, different lengths, different numbers of cutting teeth, different cutting angles, different surface finishes, and different size clip holes. Price and durability are usually design considerations too, as a usable rack of ice screws will be a significant financial investment for many climbers. Many titanium ice screws were initially made in the former Soviet Union using Cold War-era missile technology, but were generally too brittle, and so the majority of ice screws are now made of chromoly steel.

As of 2011, the strongest and most reliable type of ice screws available are the modern tubular ice screws which range in lengths from 10 to 23 cm. The approximate strength rating on a modern tubular ice screw is around 7 kN, and it has been found that short ice screws in good ice hold about 7-8 kN, no matter what the fall factor or configuration is. The International Climbing and Mountaineering Federation drop test specifies that when multi-pitch lead climbing and the leader has only placed one screw (typically merely clipping one of the anchor screws) before climbing up a couple of meters and falling (a fall factor of 2), the screw must hold. The dynamic ropes used in climbing can mitigate failure of an ice screw by keeping the impact forces low, especially if using a new rope that has not had any previous falls. It is rare that an ice screw fails in fall factors of 1 or less, if placed in good ice.

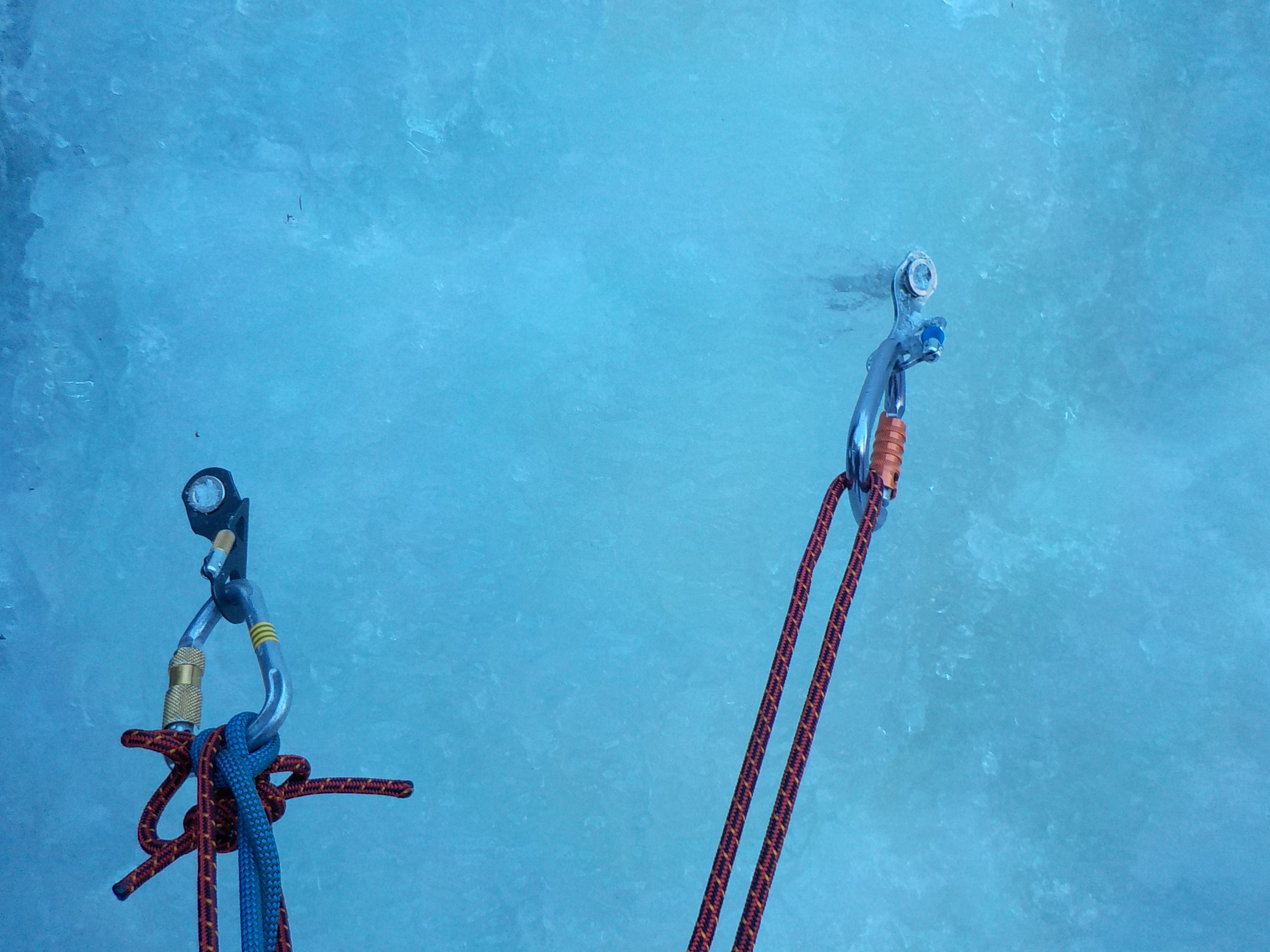
Two ice screws placed to form a solid climbing anchor point

An older type of screw that is rarely used today is a pound-in ice screw, such as the 'snarg' and the 'warthog'. Instead of screwing these into the ice one would pound them in with a hammer from the ice tool, and then screw them out with the pick of an ice axe. The pound-ins have been largely replaced by modern tubular ice screws that are stronger and easier to use, although warthogs are being manufactured in Britain again since 2007 for use in creating an anchor in frozen turf when no alternative anchor or placement is available.

The latest ice screws incorporate replaceable tips, thereby increasing the useful life of the screw and enhancing placements.

== Placement ==
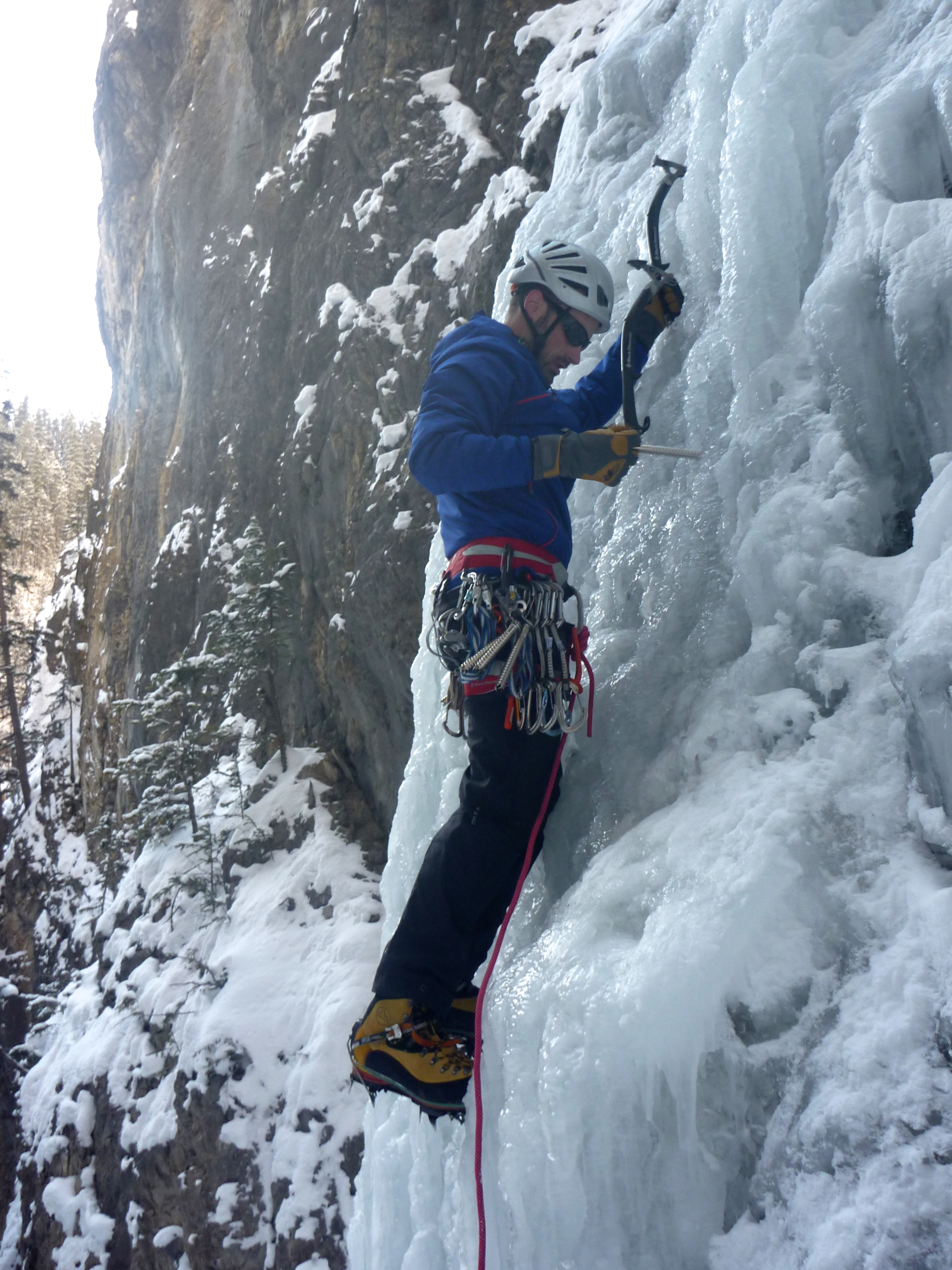
Climber placing an ice screw

It was once thought necessary or beneficial for ice-screws to be placed horizontally or with the hanger up for optimum hold. However, it has since been found experimentally that a screw placed with the tip angled up often holds as well or better. This surprising result is thought to be due to the previously underestimated role of the threads in holding the screw in place. However, horizontal placements are usually recommended.

Some climbers use tape slings to "tie-off" long ice-screws that have not been fully screwed into the ice, to reduce the leverage of a fall, which might bend or break the screw. There is some risk that such slings may move or be sliced by the screw's hanger. Some novel ice screws include a hanger that can be moved down the shaft, instead of using a sling. Placing a shorter screw is usually the preferred option, hence various lengths are available.

== Other uses ==
Long ice-screws are now often used to create V-threads. By making two ice-holes that intersect, an inexpensive but strong cord (typically static climbing accessory cord or tape) can be threaded through, making a relatively safe and cheap anchor. This can be an attractive option at belays and when ice screws are in short supply. V-threads can be particular useful as rappel or abseil points where it is often necessary to leave the final anchor behind. A piece of wire - typically a piece of old coat hanger shaped for the purpose - or a stiff flexible purpose built tool with a small hook at one end and a hanging loop at the other end, is often used to aid threading of the cord.

In the Rosetta project, the European Space Agency equipped its lander with multiple ice screws to obtain stability on comet surface, but they failed to hold, and the lander bounced a significant distance from the initial landing site.

== See also ==
- Rock-climbing equipment
