= Barry Blanchard =

Canadian mountain climber and author (born 1959)

Barry Kenneth Blanchard CM (born March 29, 1959) was one of North America's leading alpinists during the 1980s and 1990s, who was noted for pushing the standards of very technical, high-risk alpine, ice, and mixed climbing routes in the Canadian Rockies and the Himalayas.

== Climbing career ==
Blanchard was born in Calgary, Alberta, Canada. He first came to note in 1983 with the first ascent of Andromeda Strain (5.11a, WI4, M6) on Mount Andromeda in Alberta, Canada with David Cheesmond and Tim Friesen. In 1984, he climbed the North Spur of Rakaposhi, Pakistan with Dave Cheesmond and Kevin Doyle. With David Cheesmond, he climbed the North Pillar of North Twin, Alberta in 1985. Rather than resting on his laurels, he has continued to push the limits of alpinism since, including eight trips to Asia to climb in the Himalayas and Karakoram.

== Other career ==
Blanchard has been involved with Yamnuska Mountain Adventures since its inception in the late 1970s. Blanchard is an internationally certified UIAGM mountain guide.

He helped in the making of Hollywood climbing movies including K2, Cliffhanger and Vertical Limit.

He was appointed to the Order of Canada in 2024.

== Personal life ==
He lives in Canmore, Alberta, with his wife Catherine Mulvihill whom he met on a Mount Everest expedition in 1994, and their family. He has two daughters, Rosemary and Eowyn.

== Notable ascents ==
- 1983 The Andromeda Strain, Mt. Andromeda, Canada - first ascent with David Cheesmond and Tim Friesen.
- 1984 North Ridge of Rakaposhi, Pakistan - first alpine ascent with David Cheesmond and Kevin Doyle.
- 1984 East Face (V/VI 5.8 WI5) of Mount Fay, Canadian Rockies, FA with David Cheesmond and Carl Tobin.
- 1985 North Pillar of North Twin, Canada - first ascent with David Cheesmond
- 1991 North Face of Kusum Kanguru, Nepal - first ascent of route.
- 1991 Blanchard-Twight on Les Droites, Mont Blanc Massif, French Alps - hard new route with Mark Twight.
- 1999 M-16, East Face of Howse Peak, Canada - first ascent (in winter) with Steve House and Scott Backes.
- 1999 Pugilist at Rest, (VI 5.10 A3 M5, 1000m), Mount Alverstone, Saint Elias Mountains, Canada. FA with Mark Wilford.
- 2000 Infinite Spur on Mount Foraker, Alaska - third ascent with Carl Tobin.
- 2002 Infinite Patience on the Emperor Face of Mount Robson - first ascent.

== Works ==
- The Calling - A life Rocked by Mountains, for which he was awarded the 2015 Boardman Tasker Prize for Mountain Literature.
- The Echo: Stories from the Edge of Survival, published 2026.

== See also ==
- The Alpinist, a 2021 documentary in which Blanchard makes an appearance
