= North Twin Peak =

Mountain peak in Jasper NP, Alberta, Canada

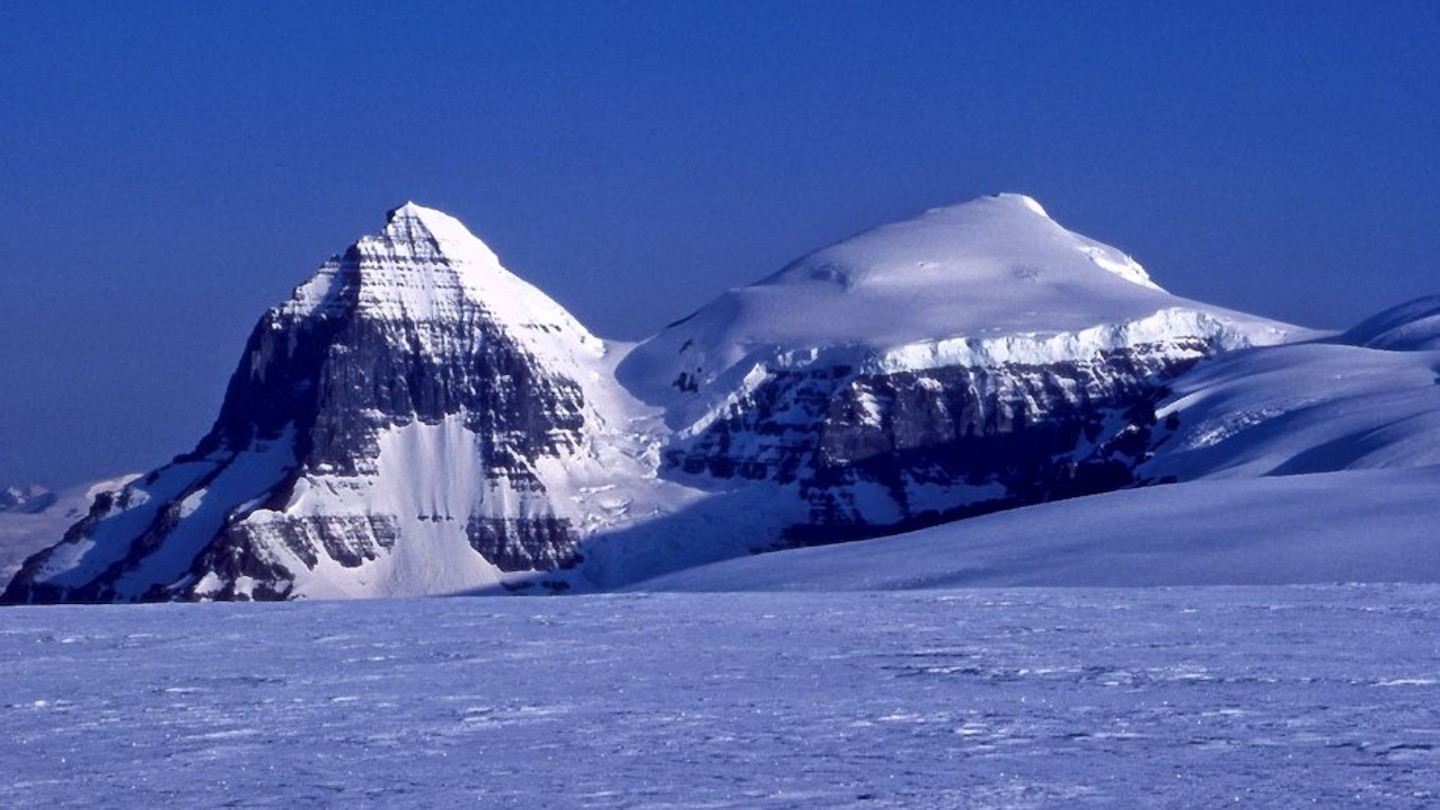
- The Twins massif - South Twin (left) and North Twin (right)

Highest point
- Elevation: 3,730 m (12,240 ft) (Note: An alternate source gives the height as 3,733m (12,247 ft).)
- Prominence: 1,010 m (3,310 ft) (Note: This prominence value is from bivouac.com.)
- Parent peak: Mount Columbia (3747 m)
- Listing: Canada highest major peaks 31st; Mountains of Alberta
- Coordinates: 52°13′25″N 117°26′04″W

Geography
- Location within Alberta
- Interactive map of North Twin Peak
- Location: Alberta, Canada
- Parent range: Winston Churchill Range
- Topo map: NTS 83C3 Columbia Icefield

Climbing
- First ascent: 1923 by W.S. Ladd, J. Monroe Thorington, guided by Conrad Kain
- Easiest route: glacier/snowfield ski

North Twin (Peak) is one of the two main peaks that comprise The Twins massif located at the northeast corner of the Columbia Icefield in Jasper National Park, Alberta, Canada. The other lower peak is named South Twin (3,566 m). North Twin is the third-highest peak in the Canadian Rockies, after Mount Robson and Mount Columbia.

The massif was named The Twins in 1898 by J. Norman Collie and Hugh M. Stutfield. The decision to name the peaks separately was approved February 28, 1980.

In addition to North Twin and South Twin, the massif contains a northern subpeak of North Twin known as Twins Tower, 3,627 m (11,900 ft) (see lower photo). This sits atop the famed north face of the massif (see below), and was named in 1984. Further, another subpeak in the massif is known as West Twin 3,360 m (11,024 ft), a picture of which can be found in the South Twin Gallery - access to this peak is from the north–south col.

== Routes ==
The first ascent of North Twin was recorded on 10 July 1923 by W.S. Ladd, J.M. Thorington, and Conrad Kain, via the East Face.

The normal route is a ski mountaineering climb on the eastern slopes, and it is possible to ski all the way to the summit. A traverse can be made to the South Twin, although an ice axe is recommended for the narrow connecting ridge.

== Notable ascents ==
The nearly vertical north face drops over 1,500 m (4,921 ft) from Twins Tower to the Athabasca River - the true summit of North Twin is somewhat removed from the top of the north face. The north face is renowned in climbing circles and has been climbed by only four parties:

- 1974 Lowe-Jones (VI 5.10 A3, 1500m), George Lowe and Chris Jones from 6 August to 12 August 1974.
- 1985 North Pillar or Blanchard/Cheesemond by Barry Blanchard and Dave Cheesmond.
- 2004 House/Prezelj by Steve House and Marko Prezelj.
- 2013 North Pillar (2nd Ascent) by Josh Wharton and Jon Walsh.

== Gallery ==
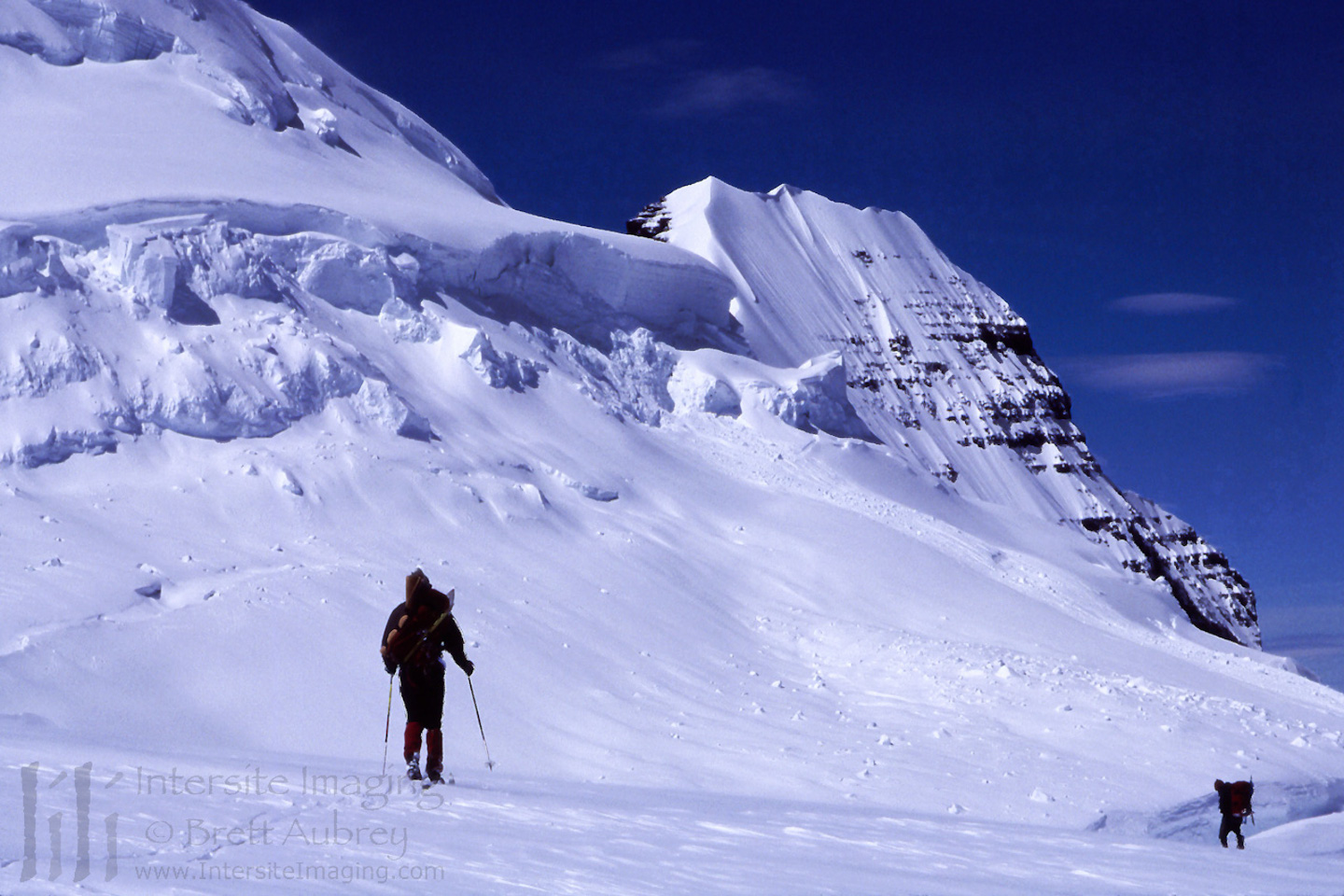
North Twin icefall and Twins Tower
