= Steve House =

Steve House may refer to:

- Sir Steve House (police officer) (born 1957), British police officer
- Steve House (climber) (born 1970), American climber and mountain guide
