= Sarah Hueniken =

Canadian mountaineer and ice climber

Personal information
- Occupation(s): Professional Alpine guide and climber

Sarah Hueniken is a Canadian Alpine Guide and professional ice climber.

In 2015, Hueniken became the first North American woman to climb an M14-rated mixed climbing route, with her ascent of Mustaing P-51 (M14-).

In January 2015, Hueniken also became the second person to scale the ice-covered rock wall next to the Horseshoe Falls at Niagara Falls. She followed her partner, Canadian climber Will Gadd. Their ascent took place on Goat Island, located on the American side of the falls.

== See also ==
- Ines Papert, leading female ice climber
