= Scott Backes =

American mountaineer (born 1957)

Personal information
- Nationality: American
- Born: 1957 (age 68–69)
- Spouse: Jill Heaberlin
- Children: 2

Sport
- Country: United States
- Sport: Mountaineering
- Event: Alpine climbing

Scott Backes (born 1957) is an American mountaineer. Backes has been called "one of the leading alpine mountain climbers in the United States." He was born in 1957 and has lived most of his life in Minnesota.

Backes started climbing in 1975. He climbs in the Alpine style, light and fast. Through the years Backes has done many extreme climbs including first ascents in the Alps, Patagonia, the Bolivian Andes, and the Alaska Range. His climbing partners include many notable mountaineers, such as Mark Twight, Steve House, Barry Blanchard, and Michael Kennedy.

== Mountaineering accomplishments ==
- "Deprivation" on Mount Hunter in the Alaska Range. This was a 72-hour blitz of a new route that halved the previous fastest time of any ascent of the North Buttress of Mt. Hunter, which is more-or-less a 4000 ft big wall capped by 2000 ft of ice climbing and requires an extremely complex descent down the West Ridge. Mark Twight was his climbing partner.
- "M16" Howse Peak East Face. Scott Backes, Barry Blanchard, and Steve House completed "One of the more difficult alpine climbs in the Canadian Rockies" and named it M16 as a response to the bolted mixed climbing that had been coming into vogue because it was "Twice as hard as "M8" in the Canadian Rockies.
- "Fuck Em, They're all Posers Anyway" in Bolivia on Pico del Norte. On this route, Scott Backes and Mark Twight climbed 19,000 ft. Pico del Norte without ropes or packs. This was a difficult climb, and they carried minimal gear.
- " The Slovak Direct" on Denali. The Slovak Direct, as it is formally called, is the toughest route on Denali, and one of the hardest routes that has ever been climbed. Scott came out of climbing retirement at age 43 to try this route with his friends Mark Twight and Steve House in the year 2000. With minimal gear, including no tent or sleeping bags, they climbed the route in a 60-hour continuous push.
- Scott Backes met Mark Twight in 1989 in Chamonix, France. There, they forged a partnership that would last for over 12 years. The routes done in the Alps included many in and around Chamonix, including a first ascent of "There Goes The Neighborhood" on the northwest face of the Aiguille Sans Nom.
