= Mark Twight =

American mountain climber, writer and gym owner (born 1961)

- Born: November 2, 1961 (age 64); Yosemite National Park, California
- Occupations: mountain climber, strength and conditioning gym owner

Mark Twight (born November 2, 1961) is an American climber, writer and the founder of Gym Jones. He rose to prominence as a mountaineer in the late 1980s and early 1990s with a series of difficult, dangerous alpine climbs in various ranges around the world. His radical, light-weight approach to alpinism has seen him regarded as an influential figure in the single-push movement.

== Climbing ==
In 1988, Twight made the first ascent of "The Reality Bath" on the White Pyramid with Randy Rackliff, which was unrepeated until January 2025. The route has been described by Canadian Rockies guidebook author, Albi Sole as "so dangerous as to be of little value except to those suicidally inclined." In his own guidebook to the Rockies, Joe Josephson declared that "The Reality Bath is undoubtedly the most dangerous ice route in the range." That same season Twight established a speed record on the 925 meter-high "Slipstream" (2hrs 4min) on the east face of Snowdome.

Twight's first ascents in the Mont Blanc massif near Chamonix, France, include "Richard Cranium Memorial" on the northwest face of Les Droites with Barry Blanchard (1990), "Beyond Good And Evil" on the north face of the Aiguille des Pelerins with Andy Parkin (1992), and "There Goes The Neighborhood" on the northwest face of the Aiguille Sans Nom with Scott Backes (1993).

In the Himalayas, Twight attempted more routes than he succeeded on, being turned away by the South Pillar of Nuptse with Jeff Lowe (twice), and shut down 1,200 feet (370 m) below the summit of Nanga Parbat when a storm forced retreat down the Rupal Face (accompanied by Barry Blanchard, Kevin Doyle and Ward Robinson). Other notable Himalayan climbs include the first ascent of the northwest face of Kangtega with Alison Hargreaves, Tom Frost and Jeff Lowe.

Twight made several notable ascents in the Alaska Range. In 1994, he and Scott Backes climbed "Deprivation" on Mount Hunter in 72 hours roundtrip, which halved the previous fastest ascent of the North Buttress. The 39 hours non-stop ascent is considered a landmark moment in the single-push climbing movement. Twight's participation in this style of climbing culminated with the 60-hour ascent of the Slovak Direct on the south face of Denali in June 2000 with Backes and Steve House. During his visits to the Alaska Range, Twight participated in a variety of high-profile rescues. Twight was nominated for the Piolet d'Or twice during his career, in 1993 for "Beyond Good and Evil" and 1995 for "Deprivation".

On February 25, 2017, Twight received the Robert and Miriam Underhill Award from the American Alpine Club. The award is given annually, "to a person who, in the opinion of the selection committee, has demonstrated the highest level of skill in the mountaineering arts and who, through the application of this skill, courage, and perseverance, has achieved outstanding success in the various fields of mountaineering endeavor".

== Later career ==
Mark Twight was the founder of Gym Jones, where he trained athletes (including MMA fighters, NFL players and professional cyclists), military personnel, actors and others.

He also consults as the technical director of Mountain Mobility Group, LLC, which provides "cold weather, high altitude, and fitness training, as well as R&D for the Department of Defense." He was hired as the subject matter expert during the development of the Protective Combat Uniform (PCU) currently issued to special operations personnel.

In 2005, Twight trained the cast and stunt crew for the movie 300, adhering to a philosophy that "appearance is a consequence of fitness". One training regimen that his crew underwent in the movie came to be known as the 300 Workout, spawning many variations by other fitness personalities and trainers.

Through Gym Jones, Twight continues to prepare actors for movie roles. His credits include, "Man of Steel", "300: Rise of an Empire", "Batman vs. Superman", "Wonder Woman" and "Justice League".

The name "Gym Jones" was chosen by Twight's former wife, Lisa. It is a reference to People's Temple leader Jim Jones. On the Gym Jones website, Mark Twight claims his favorite drink is Flavor Aid, the same product that Jones' followers mixed with cyanide in one of the largest murder-suicides in recent history in 1978. Additionally, one of the few Gym Jones shirts available for public purchase comes with the line "there's a fine line between salvation and drinking poison in the jungle" printed on the back. Twight says that "wearing it in public will require some commitment. Some readers will be offended, while others will merely scratch their ignorant heads."

Mark Twight and Michael Blevins started Nonprophet in 2018. They released their first episode of The Dissect Podcast on May 11, 2018.

== Personal life ==
After leaving climbing, Twight took up photography and competitive pistol shooting. In the mid-2000s Twight competed in ski mountaineering races in Europe and the US. Twight has become a dedicated and serious road cyclist following shoulder surgery in 2006. He has competed in a wide range of races, from omniums and hill climbs to the grueling LOTOJA (Logan to Jackson) Classic and has also written essays about cycling on his own and other websites. Twight has lived in Salt Lake City, Utah since 2001.

== Writing ==
His first book, "Extreme Alpinism: Climbing Light, Fast and High” (1999) won the Mountain Exposition award at the Banff International Mountain Book Festival and the National Outdoor Book Award. "Kiss or Kill – Confessions of a Serial Climber" (2001) won the Mountain Literature category at the Banff International Mountain Book Festival, 2001, and was shortlisted at the Trento mountain book festival in Italy, 2005. His personal website contains much recent writing about fitness, mental attitude, and other topics. His essays and articles have been published in seven countries, and translated into five languages.

== Bibliography ==
- Kiss or Kill: Confessions of a Serial Climber ISBN 978-0-89886-887-6
- Extreme Alpinism ISBN 978-0-89886-654-4
- Refuge ISBN 978-1-7335180-1-7
