= Will Gadd =

Canadian ice and mixed climber and paraglider

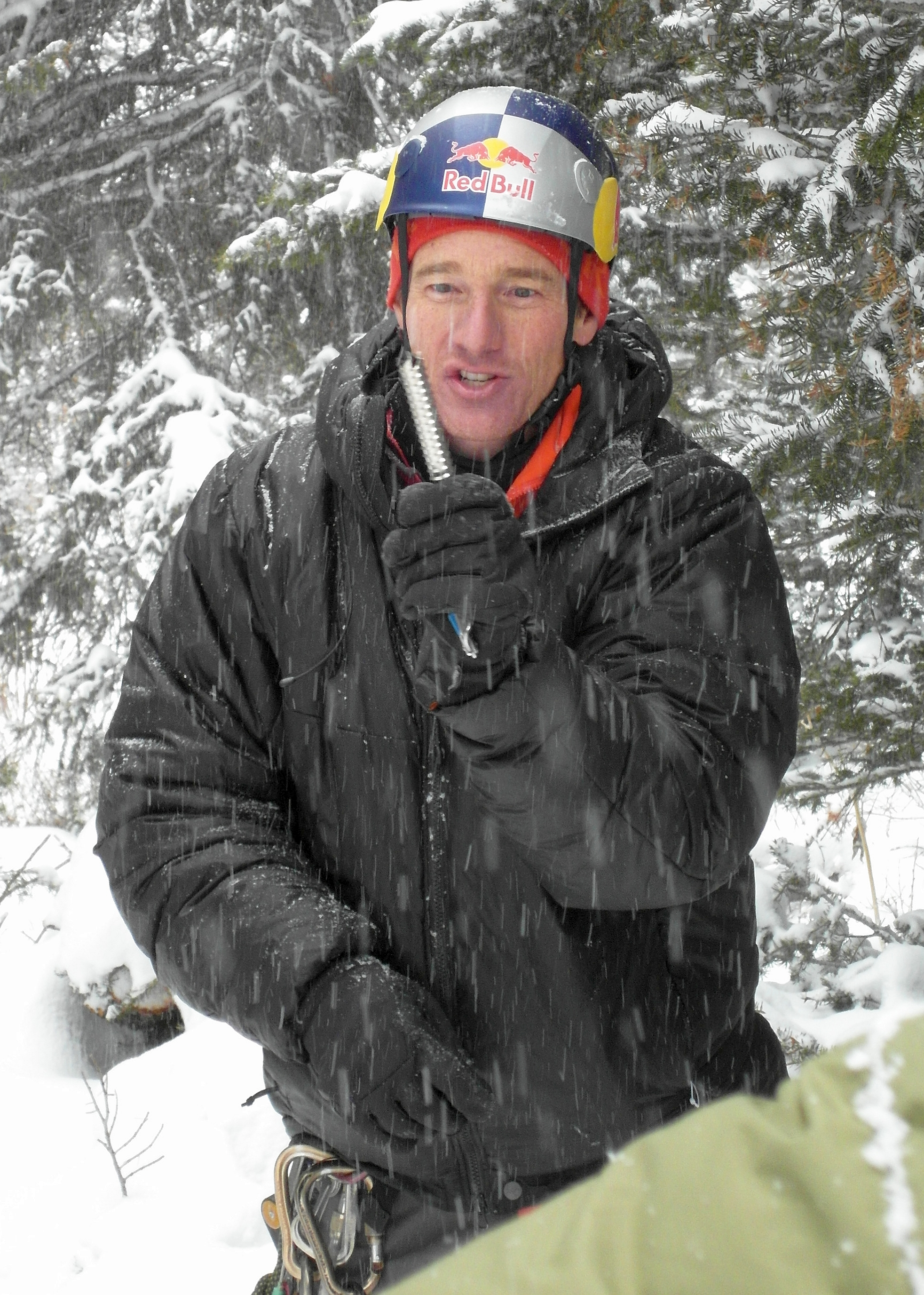
Gadd explaining the physics of ice screws, 2012

Will Gadd (born March 8, 1967) is a prominent Canadian ice climber, mixed climber and paraglider pilot. He formerly held the paragliding world distance record, with a flight of 423 km in Zapata, Texas. He is the host of the documentary series Fearless Planet, working with regional scientists and traveling with them, or by himself, to various locations that are in the individual episode's focus.

He is the son of Ben Gadd, award-winning Jasper, Alberta guide, writer and naturalist expert on the natural history of the Canadian Rockies who wrote the bestselling Handbook of the Canadian Rockies.

== Ascent of Niagara Falls ==
In January 2015, Gadd became the first reported person to scale the ice-covered rock wall next to the Horseshoe Falls at Niagara Falls; he was followed by his partner, Canadian climber Sarah Hueniken. Their ascent took place on Goat Island, located on the American side of the falls. "I was so close to the water", Gadd stated, "I could reach out and stick my ice tool in the Niagara Falls".

== See also ==
- List of climbers
