= South Twin Peak =

Mountain in Alberta, Canada

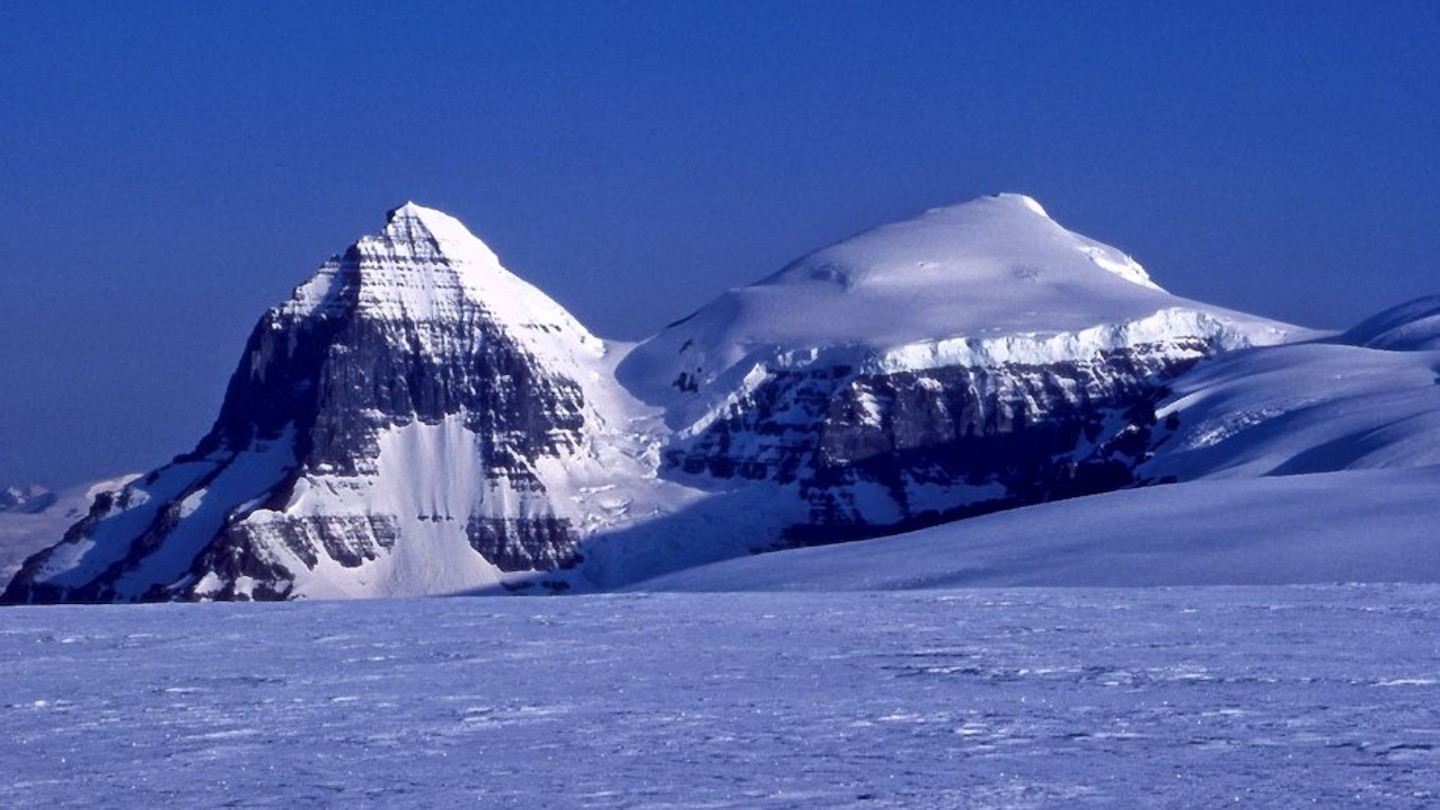
- The Twins massif - South Twin (left) and North Twin (right)

Highest point
- Elevation: 3,566 m (11,699 ft)
- Prominence: 341 m (1,119 ft)
- Listing: Mountains of Alberta
- Coordinates: 52°12′14″N 117°26′05″W

Geography
- Location within Alberta
- Interactive map of South Twin Peak
- Country: Canada
- Province: Alberta
- Protected area: Jasper National Park
- Parent range: Winston Churchill Range
- Topo map: NTS 83C3 Columbia Icefield

Climbing
- First ascent: 1924 by F.V. Field, his brother W.O. Field, and L. Harris, guided by Edward Feuz jr. and J. Biner.
- Easiest route: ski

South Twin (Peak) (3,566 m (11,699 ft)) is one of two main peaks that comprise The Twins massif located at the northeast corner of the Columbia Icefield in Jasper National Park, Alberta, Canada. The other higher main peak is named North Twin, with a height of 3,731 m (12,241 ft). South Twin is the eighth-highest peak in the Canadian Rockies.

There are two other more minor peaks within The Twins massif and they are known as Twins Tower (3,640 m (11,940 ft), first ascent in 1938) and West Twin (3,360 m (11,020 ft), first ascent in 1975). West Twin's picture is in the Gallery below and a picture of Twins Tower can be found in the North Twin article. All four of these peaks are listed in the 11,000ers.

The massif was named The Twins in 1898 by J. Norman Collie and Hugh M. Stutfield. The decision to name the peaks separately was approved February 28, 1980.

The mountain was named in 1898 by J. Norman Collie and Hugh M. Stutfield.

== Routes ==
The normal route is a ski mountaineering climb on the eastern slopes of North Twin, and then a traverse to the South Twin, although an ice axe is recommended for the narrow connecting ridge as well as the summit ridge.

== Gallery ==
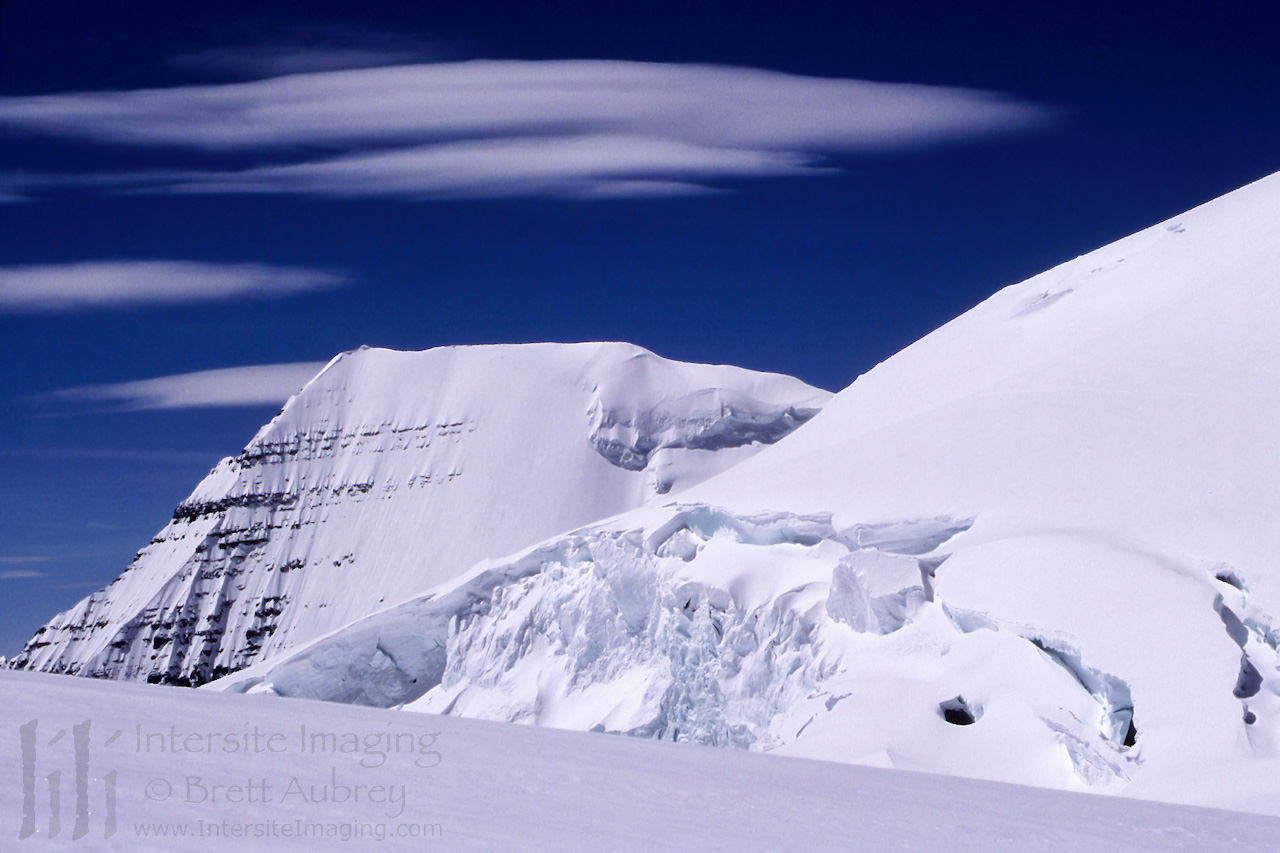
North Twin Slopes (rt) & South Twin (lt)

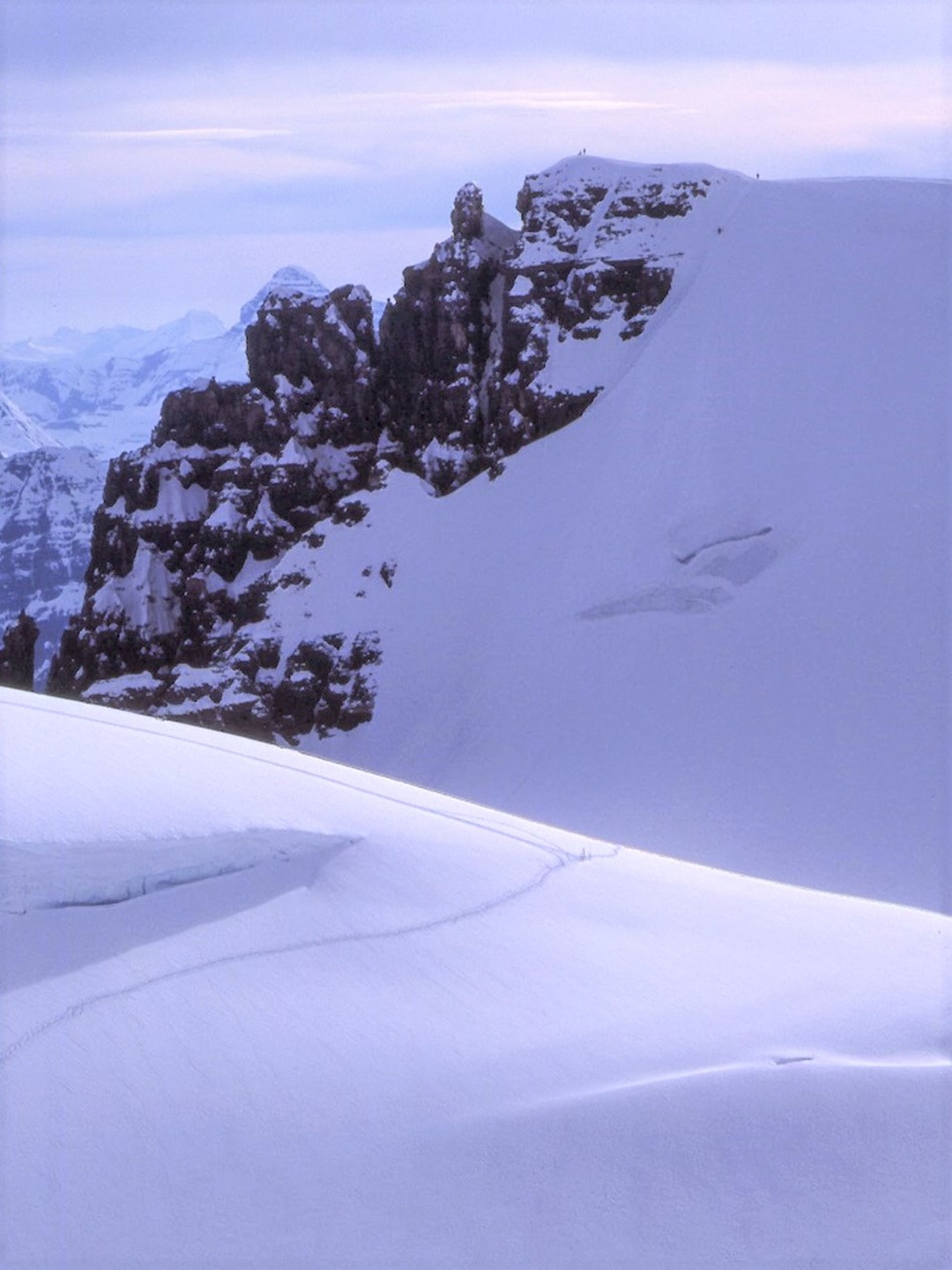
West Twin; Note 4 climbers

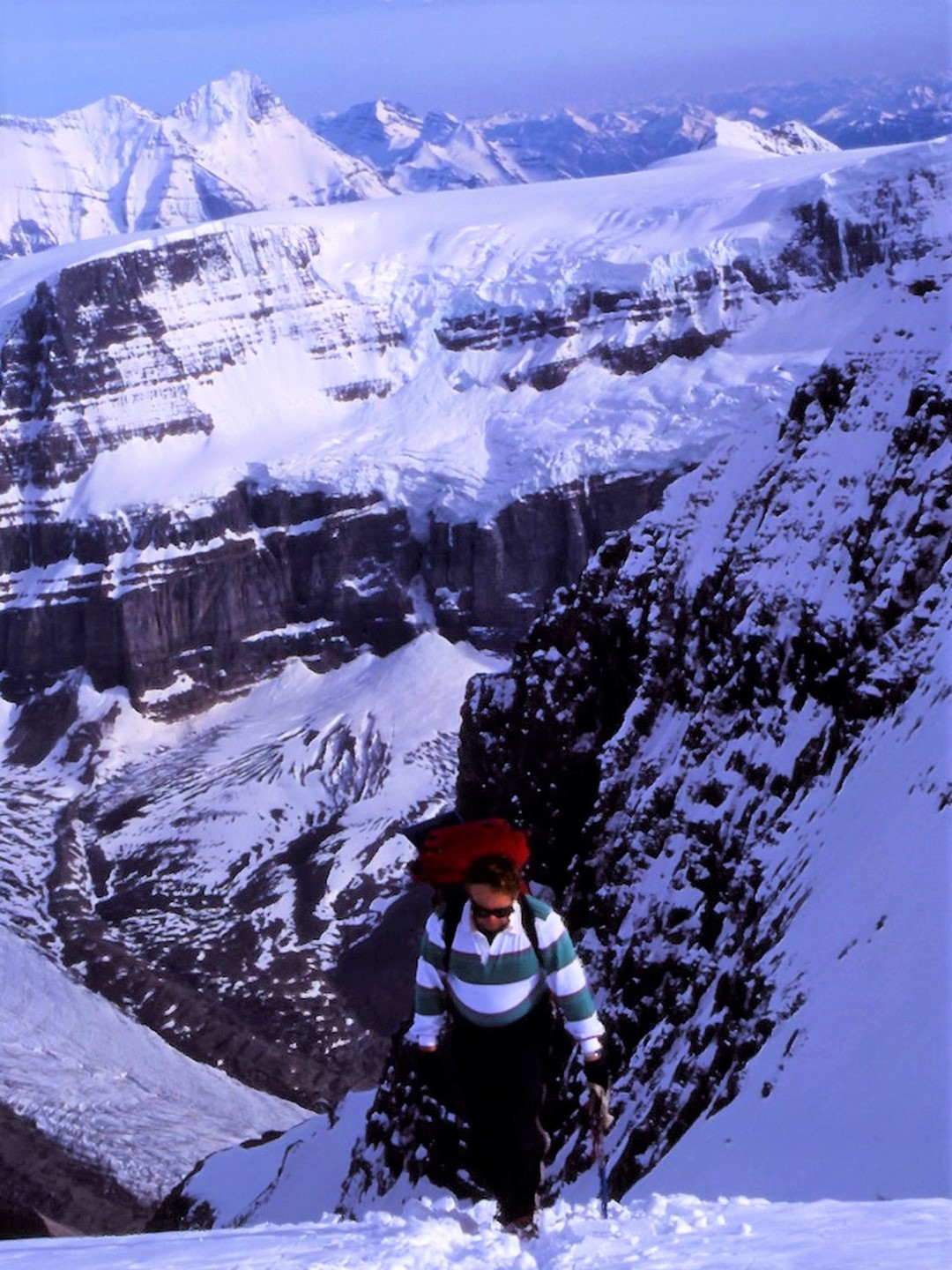
Trudging up from the Twins col

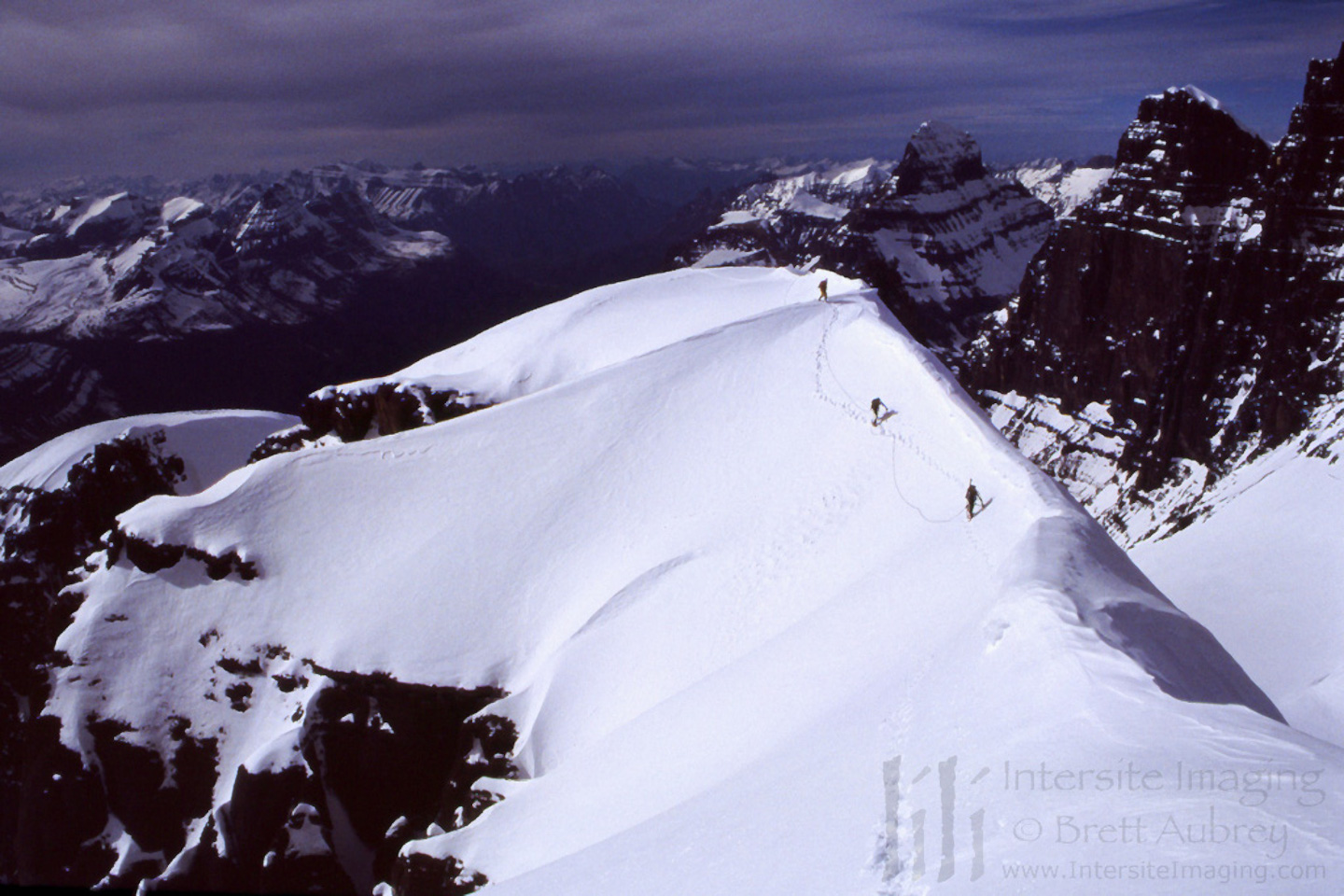
South Twin Summit Ridge, taken from summit

== See also ==
- List of mountains in the Canadian Rockies
