= Vince Anderson (mountaineer) =

American mountain climber

Vince Anderson is an American professional mountaineer, writer and mountain guide company manager from Ridgway, Colorado. He and Steve House won the Piolet d'Or in 2006 for an alpine-style first ascent of the Central Pillar of the Rupal Face, (4100m, M5 X, 5.9, WI4), September 1–8, 2005 on Nanga Parbat in northern Pakistan.

== Notable ascents ==
- 2003 Carte Blanche, White cliffs of Dover, UK, with Yann Bonneville, Manu Ibarra and Jerome Blanc-Gras.
- 2005 Central Pillar of the Rupal Face, (4100m, M5 X, 5.9, WI4), September 1–8, on Nanga Parbat in northern Pakistan with Steve House
- 2007 K7 West (6858m), Charakusa Valley, Karakorum, Pakistan FA of peak with Steve House and Marko Prezelj.
- 2008 House-Anderson (WI5+ M8 R/X, 1000m), North Face, Mount Alberta (3619m), Canadian Rockies, Alberta, Canada. FA of route with Steve House, March 26–28, 2008
- 2022 : Suerte (1 100 m, 5.13a, M7, WI6), East Face, Jirishanca (Peru) with Josh Wharton

== Publications ==
Anderson, Vince (January 2, 2008). "Inspirations, Part 1: Vince Anderson". Alpinist. 22. Jackson, WY, USA: Alpinist Magazine.
