= Yamnuska Mountain Adventures =

Mountaineering school & adventure company

Yamnuska Mountain Adventures is a mountaineering school and mountain adventure company located in Canmore, Alberta, Canada. The company was founded in 1975.

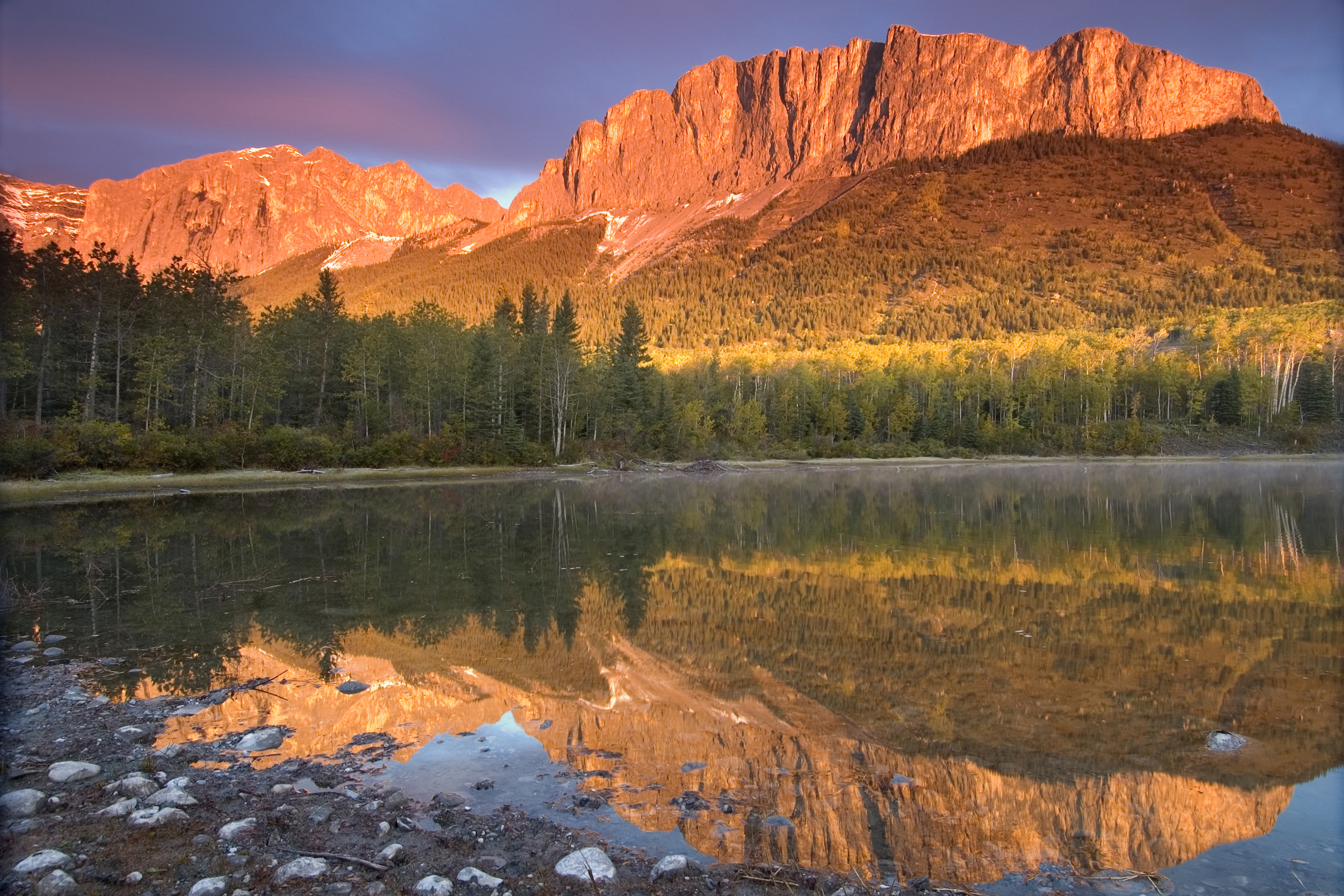
Mount Yamnuska

== Company Name ==
The company was named after Mount Yamnuska, a First Nations name (Stoney) that translates to "flat-faced mountain". Mount Yamnuska is also a popular rock climbing destination.

== History ==
Yamnuska Inc. mountaineering school was created in 1975 as part of the YMCA's outdoor education centre in Seebe, Alberta, about 80 km west of Calgary. Programs included backpacking, rock climbing and mountaineering.

Early instructors included James Blench, Barry Blanchard, Dwayne Congdon, Chris Miller, Marni Virtue and Sharon Wood - Barry Blanchard is still involved with the organization. The 'Wilderness Program' left the YMCA and 'Yamnuska Mountain School', a non-profit society directed by Bruce Elkin, was formed. It was based out of the garages of Bruce Elkin and Barry Blanchard's in Canmore, Alberta.

The next years saw a steady evolution, as instruction in mountaineering, rock and ice climbing became the core activities additionally, the 3 month Mountain Skills Semester became an annual event (the Mountain Skills Semester was created in 1980 and it is still offered by the company twice a year, Spring and Fall). In the early 80's the outdoor adventure instructional market was growing. This prompted Yamnuska Mountain School to transition to a for-profit company in late 1985 which was owned by James Blench and Marni Virtue. In 1989, David Begg, a New Zealand guide, became the owner of the company.

In 2005, the company was re-branded as Yamnuska Mountain Adventures to reflect the growth in the program offerings that were then part of the business. Between 2010 and 2017 and after over 20 years of leadership under David Begg, the company transferred ownership to Len Youden, Jesse de Montigny and Dave Stark. Len Youden had been a past guest of Yamnuska Mountain Adventures and transitioned from the larger corporate world into the adventure tourism industry. Jesse de Montigny (current managing director) and Dave Stark (current Director of Risk Management) were both long term employees and ACMG/IFMGA Mountain Guides with Yamnuska Mountain Adventures. During the volatility of the 2020-2022 COVID-19 years, Len Youden transferred the remainder of his ownership to Tim Ricci (IFMGA/ACMG Mountain Guide and current Director of Operations), Paul McDougall, Tom Ebbern, Greg Sylvestre and David Howard. Barry Blanchard continues to work at Yamnuska Mountain Adventures as an associate director and ACMG/IFMGA Mountain Guide.

Individuals, groups, corporations and military organizations from all over the world continue to choose Yamnuska Mountain Adventures as their provider. Yamnuska Mountain Adventures has become known as the leader in the industry with their program delivery, high levels of risk management and customer service.

== Guides ==
All of Yamnuska Mountain Adventures climbing, skiing and hiking guides are trained and certified by the Association of Canadian Mountain Guides (ACMG). The ACMG is a member-country of the International Federation of Mountain Guide Associations which is often known by its French acronym (UIAGM). Yamnuska Mountain Adventure's guides operate within the strict Scope of Practice of the ACMG.

In 1993, Yamnuska Mountain Adventures was the second largest employer of Certified Mountain Guides in North America. It is expected that this is true to today.

The very exacting standards to which Yamnuska Mountain Adventure's guides are held should not obscure the fact that the guides are the heart and soul of the company. Yamnuska Mountain Adventure's guides have been responsible for many new routes in the Canadian Rockies and abroad, such as by Barry Blanchard.

== Sponsorship and Community Involvement ==
John Lauchlan Award

Yamnuska Mountain Adventures is an annual supporter of the JLA, an award designed to assist expeditions of Canadian mountaineers and explorers. The criteria for the award includes Innovation, Canadian, Exploratory, Environmentally Sensitive, Bold, Lightweight & self-contained, and Non-commercial.

Climber’s Access Society of Alberta (CASA)

The purpose of the Climbers’ Access Society is to provide and preserve public access for climbers to the montane and alpine regions as well as related and surrounding wilderness of the Rocky Mountain Cordillera and Eastern Slope foothills of Alberta. CASA aims to aid in the conservation of montane, alpine and other wilderness areas of Alberta, while supporting their use by the climbing, hiking or other soft tread public. Yamnuska Mountain Adventures supports this organization.

Canmore Knuckle Basher Ice Climbing Festival

Yamnuska Mountain Adventures sponsored the Knuckle Basher 2010 Ice Climbing Festival. Yamnuska guides ran the skills clinics.

Banff Youth Climbing Competition

Yamnuska Mountain Adventures sponsored different categories from 2007 - 2010. The competition hosts young climbers from Western Canada.

The Association of Bow Valley Climbers (TABVAR)

TABVAR was founded in 1994, for the purpose of raising and distributing funds to help with the material costs incurred in the installation of fixed hardware on and maintenance of climbs in the Bow Valley and adjacent areas. Yamnuska Mountain Adventures supports this organization.

Banded Peak Challenge

The Banded Peak Challenge was created in 2000 and raises money for The Easter Seals Camp Horizon in Bragg Creek, AB, Canada

Avalanche Canada Foundation

Yamnuska Mountain Adventures has provided financial support for the Avalanche Canada Foundation whose mission is to minimize public risk in avalanche terrain by raising funds to support public avalanche safety initiatives and related research.

Banff Mountain Book Festival

Yamnuska Mountain Adventures has sponsored the Award for Best Book - Mountain Exposition. The Banff Mountain Book Festival is an annual book festival that celebrates mountain literature. The Mountain Exposition category includes guidebooks and "how-to" books dealing with physical activity in a mountain area.

Southern Ontario Ice Climbing Festival (SOICF)

The SOICF has been supported by Yamnuska Mountain Adventures with guides and equipment on their field instructional and experiential climbing days.

Canmore Indoor Climbing Society (CICS)

CICS are the organizers of Canmore's Junior indoor climbing team. Yamnuska Mountain Adventures has supported CICS with outdoor climbing days for the athletes.
