= Mark Wilford =

American rock climber and alpinist (born 1959)

Mark Wilford (born January 27, 1959, Boulder, Colorado) is an American rock climber and alpinist known for his bold, traditional style.

== Biography ==
Wilford graduated from Poudre High School in Fort Collins, Colorado in 1977 and attended the University of Colorado at Boulder for one semester. He began climbing in 1970, and became a leading rock climber while still in high school, gradually adding bold ice climbing, alpine rock and alpine mixed routes to his accomplishments. Wilford is considered a staunch traditionalist when it comes to the style and ethics of climbing.

Wilford works as a Sales Representative for Julbo, La Sportiva, Sterling and Metolius. He is a climbing ambassador for Patagonia.

He was married in 2002 and lives in Fort Collins with his wife and two children.

== Notable climbs ==
- 1976 Diagonal Direct, (V 5.9 A4 800'), Longs Peak, RMNP, Colorado, USA. First winter ascent with Ken Duncan.
- 1981 Hypertension (5.12b) and Remote Control (5.12c) Vedauwoo, Wyoming, USA. First ascent with Skip Guerin.
- 1983 Gray Pillar/D7, (V1 5.9 A4 1500'), Longs Peak, RMNP, Colorado, USA. Winter solo enchainment.
- 1984 Risky Business, (IV 5.11+ R/X 800'), Chiefs Head, RMNP, Colorado, USA. FA with Jeff Lowe.
- 1985 Bird Brain Boulevard, (IV WI5 M6, 1000'), Ouray, Colorado, USA. FA with Jeff Lowe (climber) and Charlie Fowler.
- 1988 Original Route, (ED2), North Face of The Eiger, Bernese Oberland, Switzerland. First American solo ascent.
- 1991 North Face/North Ridge, (VI 5.9 A3), Mount Alberta, Canadian Rockies, Canada. Solo ascent.
- 1992 Run for Cover, (VII 5.11 A3, 1000m), Trango Tower, Karakorum, Pakistan. FA with Greg Child.
- 1999 Pugilist at Rest, (VI 5.10 A3 M5, 1000m), Mount Alverstone, Saint Elias Mountains, Canada. FA with Barry Blanchard.
- 2000 The Southeast Face (VI 5.10 A1, 1050m), The Battleaxe, Kangikitsoq Fjord, Greenland. First ascent with Mark Richey, Aug 8–9, 2000.
- 2000 The West Pillar (V 5.11 R, 575m), The Warrior, Kangikitsoq Fjord, Greenland. First ascent with Mark Richey, Aug 15, 2000.
- 2001 Barbarossa, (VI 5.9 A2 M5), North Face of Yamandaka, Karakorum, India. FA with Mark Richey.
- 2018 "Old Man of Stoer"
- 2019 “Picu Uriellu”

== Bibliography ==
- Alone on the North Face of Alberta, in The High Lonesome, Epic Solo Climbing Stories edited by John Long, Globe Pequot Press, Guilford, CT, USA, 1999.
