= Mixed climbing =

Ice climbing on ice and rock surfaces

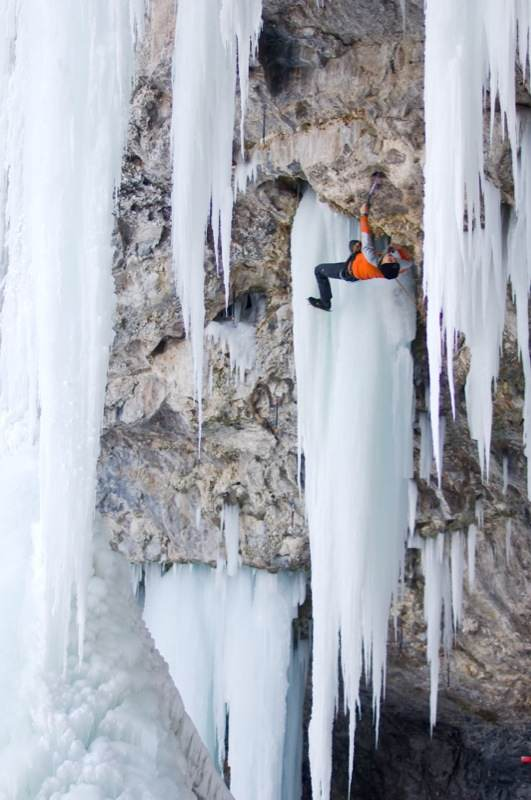
American climber Rich Purnell on an M9-graded mixed climbing route in Glenwood Canyon, Colorado.

Mixed climbing is an ice climbing discipline used on climbing routes that do not have enough ice to be regular ice climbs, but are also not dry enough to be regular rock climbs. To ascend the route, the mixed-climber uses normal ice-climbing equipment throughout (e.g. double ice tools or ice axes in their hands, and crampons on their feet), but to protect the route, they use both ice and rock equipment. Mixed climbing varies from routes with sections of thick layers of ice interspersed with sections of bare rock, to routes that are mostly rock but which are "iced up" in a thin layer of ice and/or snow.

While alpinists have used mixed climbing techniques for decades on alpine routes (most north-facing alpine routes are iced or snow-covered), mixed climbing as a standalone sport came to wider prominence with Jeff Lowe's ascent of the partially bolted Octopussy (WI6, M8 R) in 1994. Mixed climbing also led to the sport of dry-tooling, which is mixed climbing on routes that are completely free of all ice or snow. The equipment used — the lengths of ice tools and the use of heel spurs and ice axe leashes — has become more regulated to avoid concerns of being more like aid climbing than free climbing. (Note: The use of artificial aid by the climber in gaining upward momentum is termed aid climbing and is considered a lesser style than free climbing, which uses no such aid.)

Mixed climbing routes are graded for difficulty on an M-grade system, and the development of specialized mixed climbing techniques (e.g. stein pulls and figure-four moves), and specialised equipment (e.g. fruit boots, heel spurs, and advanced ergo ice axes), led to dramatic increases in mixed climbing grade milestones, particularly from 1994 to 2003, and have also been credited with pushing standards in the wider field of alpine climbing. Many modern mixed routes are now bolted like sport climbing routes, but some mixed climbing routes still use traditional climbing-type protection—particularly on multi-pitch routes.

== Description ==
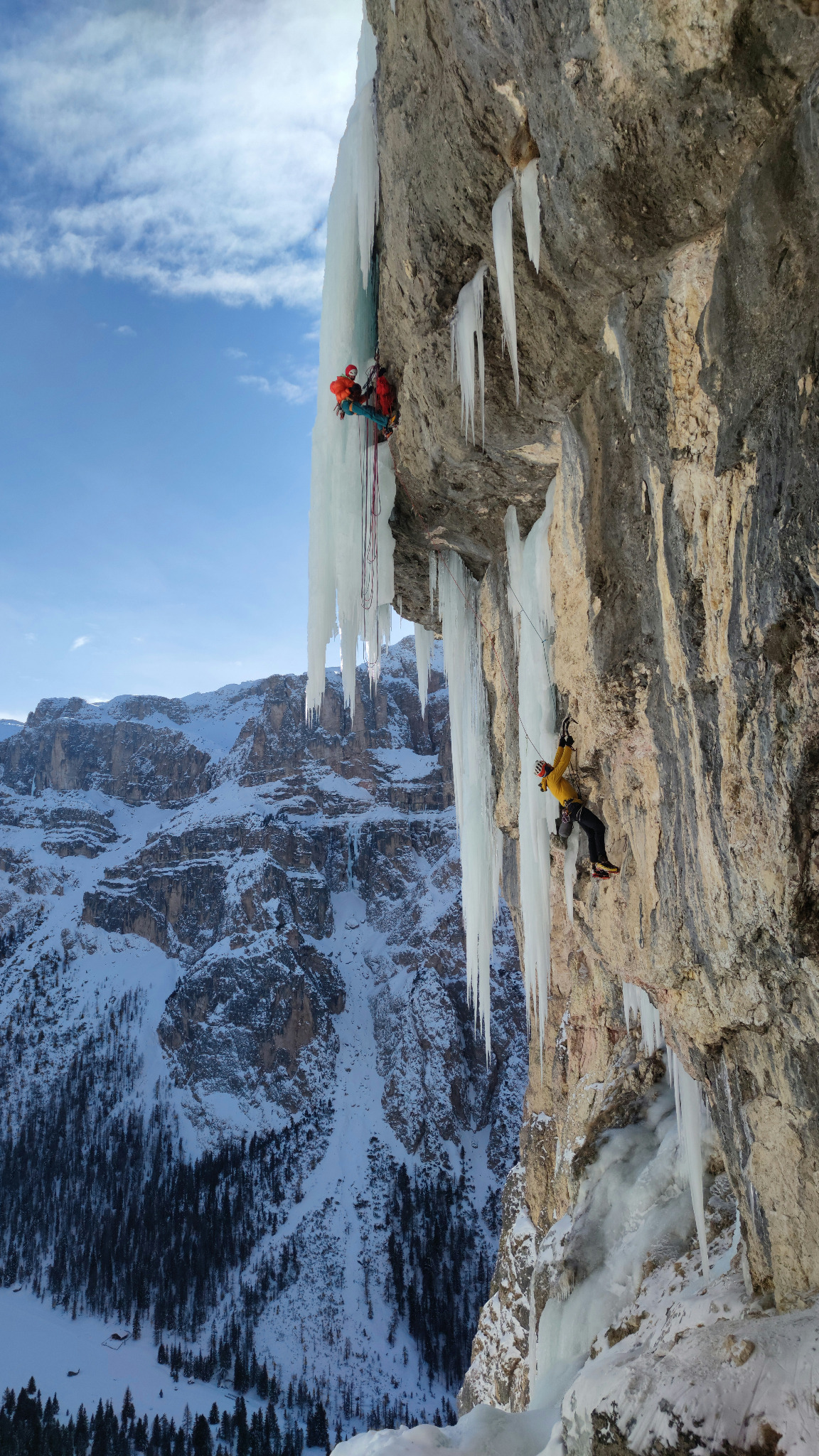
A team on Flauto Magico (130-metres, WI5+, M9, 4-pitches) in the Vallunga Valley, Dolomites, Italy

Mixed climbing uses ice climbing equipment (e.g. double ice axes and crampons) on routes that are not sufficiently covered in ice to be pure ice climbs and have a WI-grade. Mixed climbing routes have significant elements that are pure rock, which in some cases may be completely dry (e.g. as found on some North American mixed climbing routes), but in many cases is covered in a thin layer of ice and snow (e.g. as found in Scottish mixed climbing), thus making pure rock or ice climbing techniques impossible.

The mixed climber uses their ice axe and crampons to advance up the route by inserting them into small cracks and edges on the iced-up rock. They use the equipment of a traditional climbing rock climber for climbing protection, as there will be limited possibilities to use ice screws to protect the route. It has also become common to find single-pitch mixed climbs that are fully bolted in the manner of sport climbing routes. Mixed climbing can also be done as free solo climbing, which is an even risker undertaking.

Mixed climbing is closely related to alpine climbing, as many alpine climbing routes have large sections of iced and snow-covered rock that can neither be rock climbed (i.e. too slippery) nor climbed as a pure ice climb (i.e. not enough ice). Mixed climbing is also closely related to the sport of dry-tooling, which was developed by mixed climbers doing routes with no snow or ice, but still using the tools and techniques of mixed climbing; mixed climbs that have no ice are sometimes given a "D" prefix instead of an "M" prefix in their grade.

There has been debate as to whether mixed climbing is more akin to aid climbing, rather than the more desirable style of free climbing, due to its use of mechanical tools on natural rock. This has led to increased oversight on allowable tools (e.g. use of heel spurs, length of axes, and use of leashes for resting or to help with upward momentum, etc.); and most ice climbing competitions no longer allow leashes and regulate the use of heel spurs (e.g. if allowed at all, they cannot be used for resting).

=== Types of routes ===
Types of mixed climbing routes

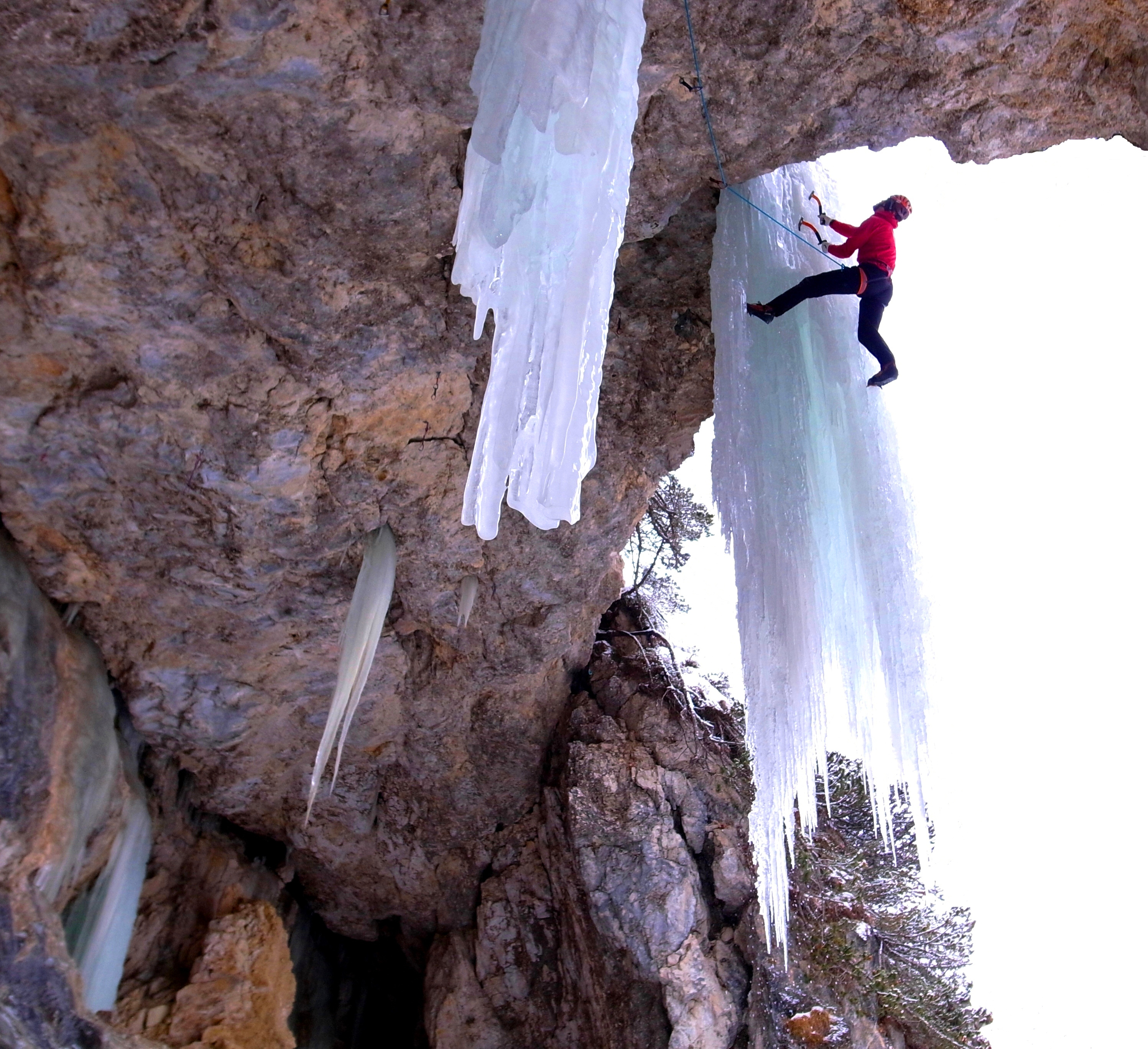
Silent Memories (WI6, M9), Italy.

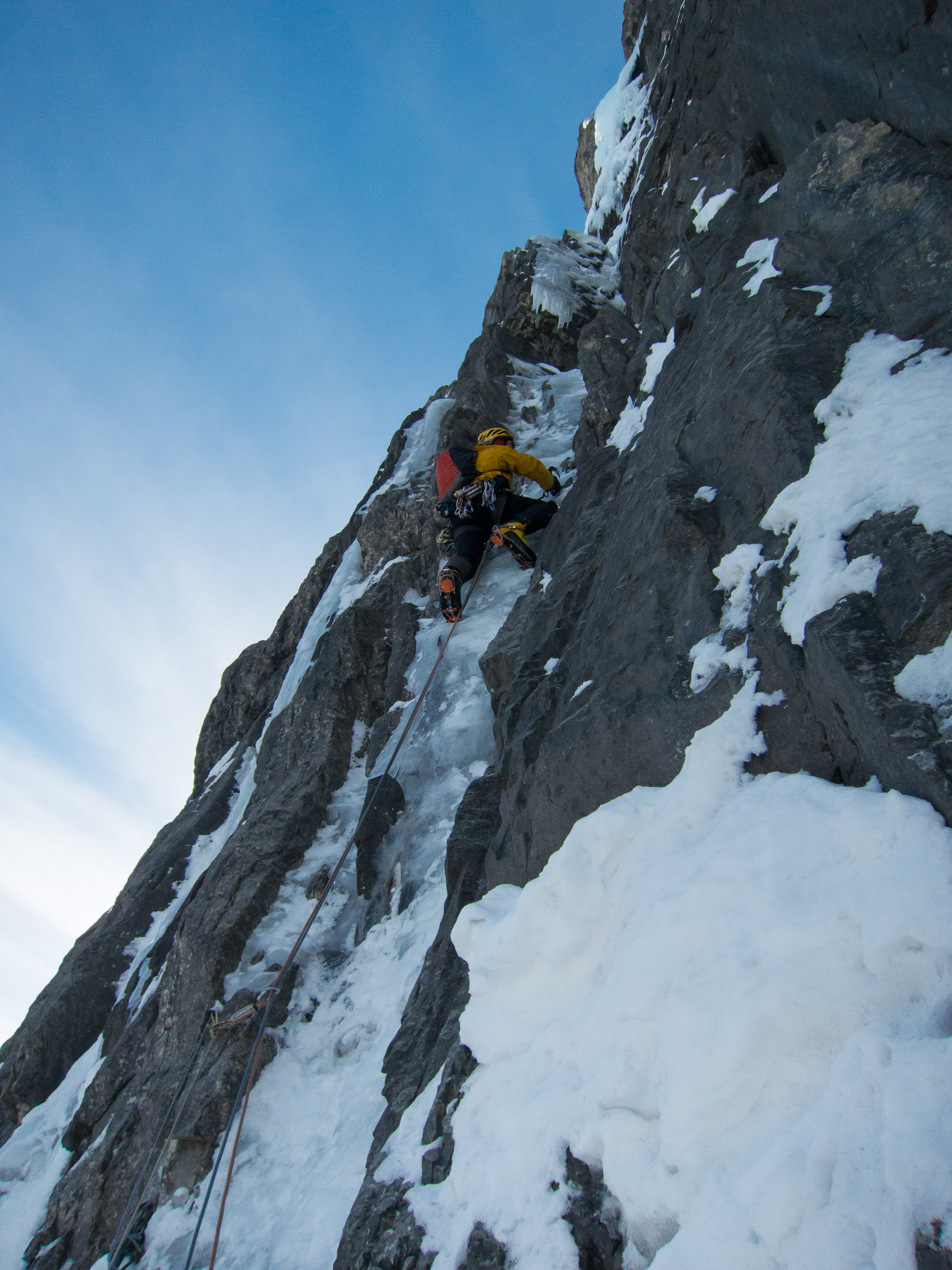
French Reality (WI6+, M7-), Canada.

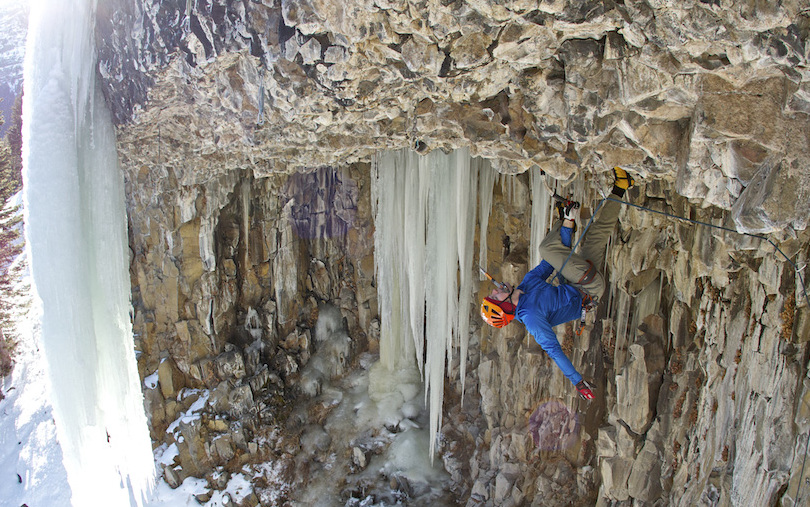
North West Passage (M11), Montana.

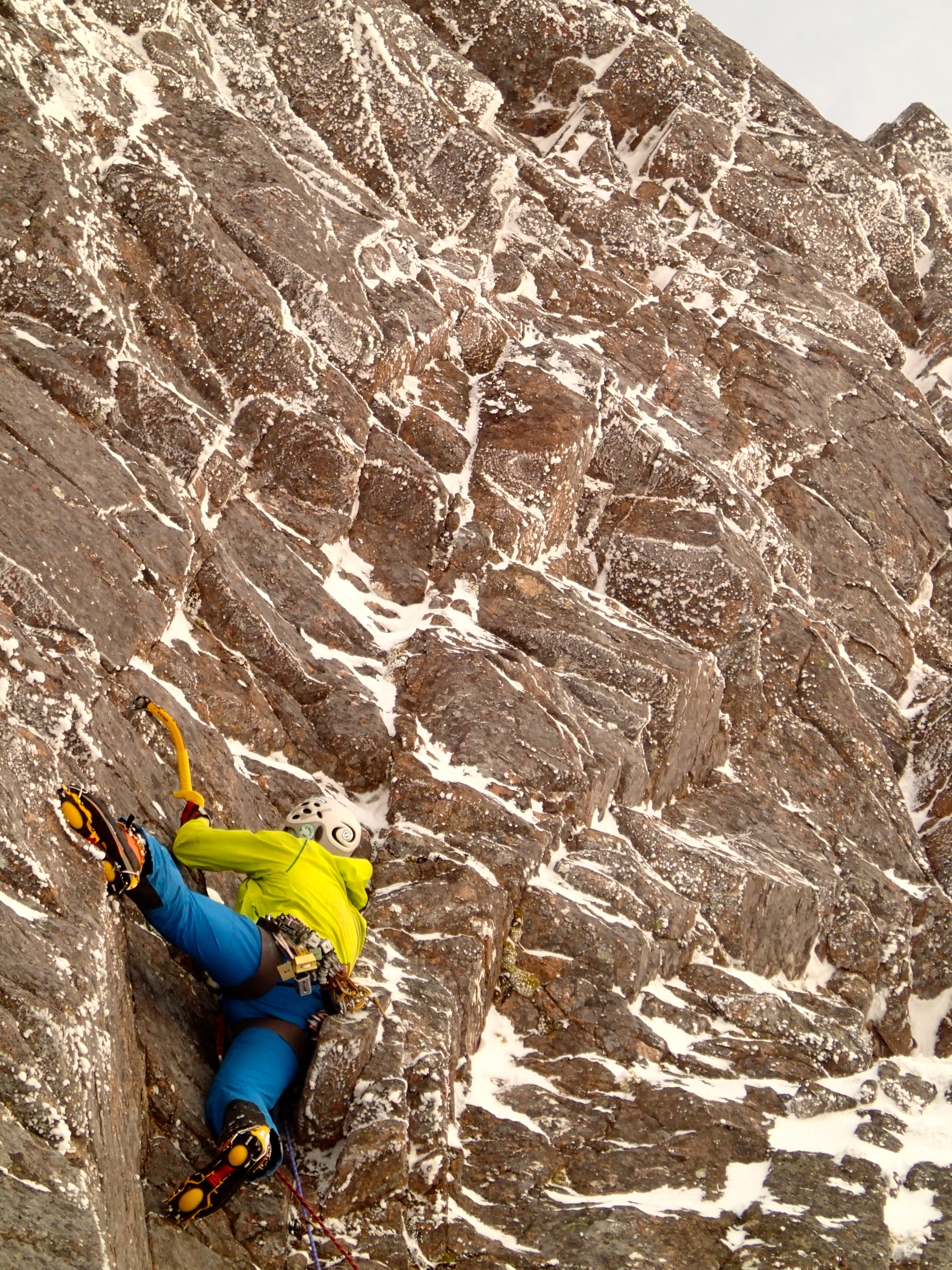
Banana Wall (XII/12), Scotland.

Mixed climbing routes can cover a broad range of types. Some mixed climbing routes are combinations of an ice climbing route (i.e. a large frozen icicle, frozen alpine couloirs, or frozen water cascade) and a dry-tooling route (i.e. need to pass a rock overhang or rock roof to get to the frozen ice part); these routes have both a full mixed climbing grade (M-grade) and a full ice climbing grade (WI-grade). Examples of such routes are the American mixed climbing route, Octopussy (WI6, M8), Silent Memories (WI6, M9) in Italy, or French Reality (M7-, WI6+) in Canada.

Other types of mixed climbing routes have no material 'ice climbing' sections per se (and thus have no substantive WI-grade). Such routes are effectively rock routes but where the rock is covered in a thin layer of ice and/or snow that makes normal rock climbing techniques impossible. Examples of such routes include many Scottish winter climbs, such as Wailing Wall (Scottish mixed climbing grade XI, 9) or Banana Wall (Scottish mixed climbing grade XII, 12), or North West Passage (M11) in Montana.

== History ==
While alpine climbers and Scottish winter climbers have used mixed climbing techniques for decades, mixed climbing as a standalone sport came to prominence in 1994 when American climber Jeff Lowe climbed the roof of Octopussy (WI6, M8) in Vail, Colorado, creating the world's first M8-graded mixed climb. In 2014, Rock & Ice credited Lowe's 1994 ascent with effectively inventing the sport of mixed climbing.

Lowe's ascent led to an increase in interest in mixed climbing, and from 1994 to 2003 levels of difficulty rose sharply from M8 to M13, driven by mixed-climbing pioneers such as Stevie Haston in Europe (particularly in Val di Cogne), and Will Gadd in North America (particularly in the Fang Amphitheater in Vail, and in the Cineplex Cave in Alberta). In 2003, Italian climber Mauro Bole finding he was too short for the crux on The Game (M13) in Cineplex Cave, lengthened his tools and completed it. This led to implications that mixed-climbing was akin to aid climbing. A similar debate had been boiling over on 'heel spurs', which Gadd had stopped using (calling it "barebacking"), and writing a manifesto titled "Spurs are for Horses, and Tools Are For Your Hands", which stated "A route climbed by sitting on your tool, hooking a tool with your knees or spurs or even using spurs is an aid climb".

Competition ice climbing began to regulate the use of tools, including heel spurs, tool length, and tool leashes (which can be used for resting or to help with upward momentum). In 2012, mixed-climber Ryan Nelson wrote an article in Rock & Ice titled "Is mixed climbing still legitimate?". Scottish climber Dave MacLeod told Nelson, "Modern-mixed is definitely approaching stagnation", and "Ditching heel spurs will no doubt give it another gasp of life, but it only puts it off a year or two. The reason is, of course, that [climbing] a full ropelength of horizontal roof on tiny hooks is relatively easy".

While the evolution of grade milestones in mixed climbing has tapered since 2003, leading mixed climbers such as Raphel Slawinski have highlighted the positive effect of mixed climbing on overall standards in alpine climbing. Other alpine climbers such as Steve House have cautioned that the reliance on fully bolted sport climbing routes for the highest M-grades has not yet led to a discernable impact on general standards in alpine climbing.

== Equipment ==
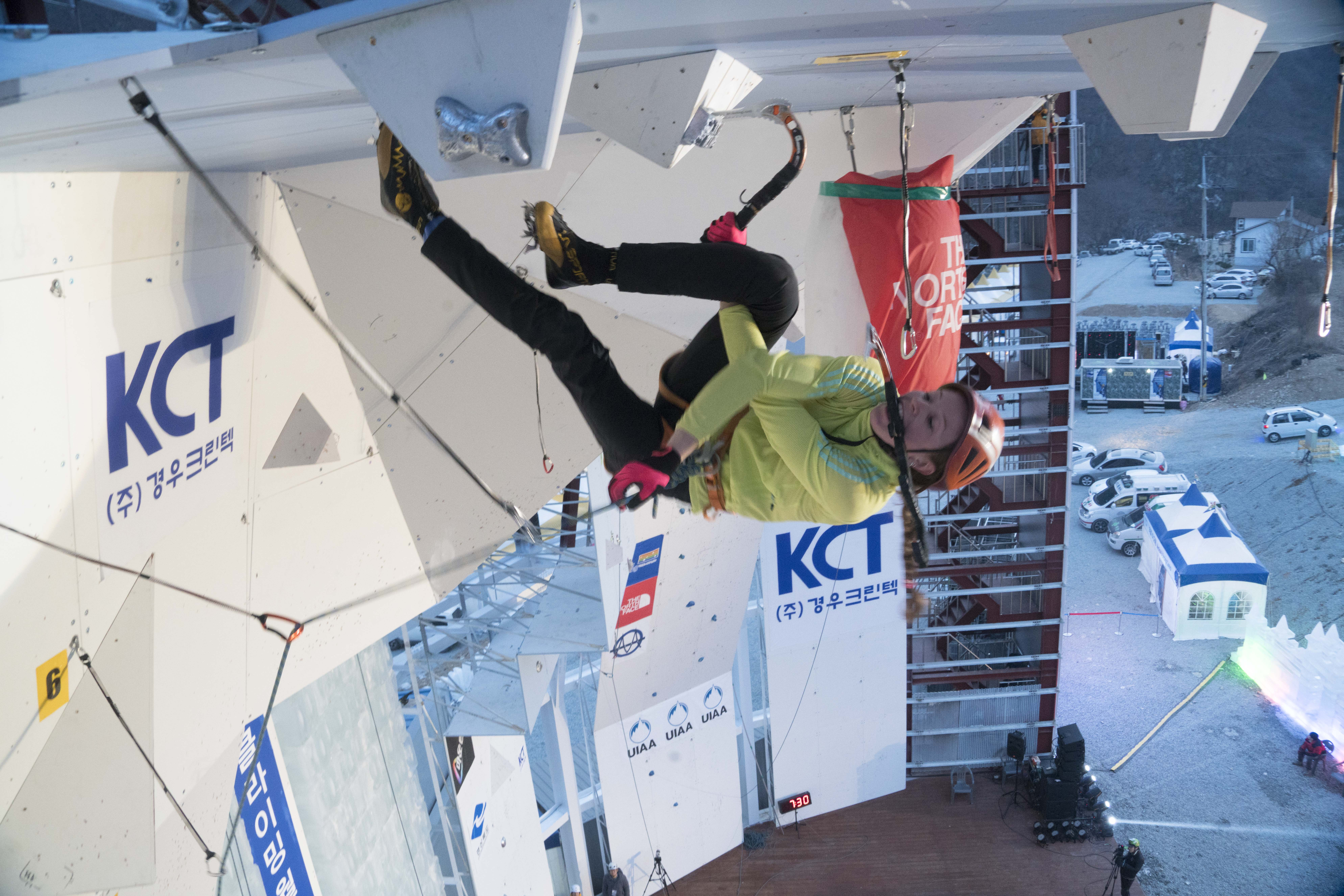
Climber wearing fruit boots while performing a figure-four move in the 2016 Ice Climbing World Cup

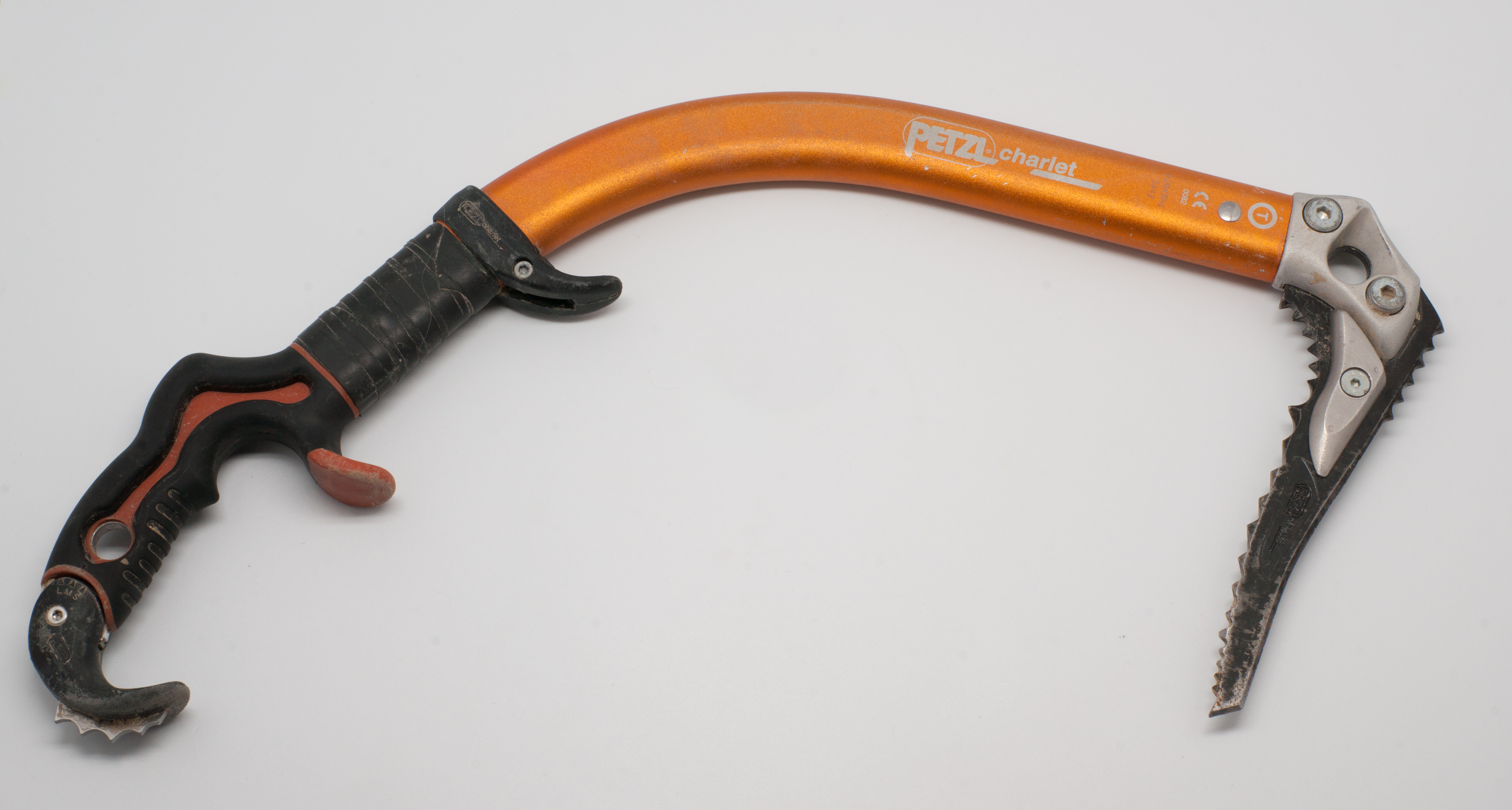
Advanced ergo ice axe.

Mixed climbing started by using existing ice climbing equipment for upward momentum (e.g. double ice axes and crampons), and for protection (e.g. ice screws), and also existing traditional rock climbing equipment (e.g. nuts, hexcentrics and cams) or sport climbing equipment (e.g. bolts and quickdraws) for additional protection.

As the sport developed, specialized equipment was created including:

- Fruit boots. These are lightweight boots with crampons that are bolted into the boot (and not clipped on as with the standard heavy mountaineering boots used in traditional ice climbing). They have become the standard in competitive dry-tooling and ice-climbing competitions.
- Mono-points. Mixed climbers prefer mono-point crampons arrangements so that they can maintain more precise control over their footwork (which is more difficult with the traditional dual-point crampons).
- Heel spurs. A mono-point crampon that extends from the rear of the boot to enable heel hooks and enable more extensive resting positions, however, the use of heel spurs has become more regulated in competition climbing as it has become considered to be akin to aid climbing.
- Advanced ice axes. The requirement for mixed climbers to climb rock overhangs and rock roofs led to the development of more advanced ice axe designs; in addition, the need for extreme-level mixed climbers to avoid ice axe leashes (now banned in competitions) also required different handle shapes.
- Ice tool tethers. While leashes are now less in use, many use elasticated ice tool tethers, sometimes also confusingly called "leashes", in case they drop a tool but which does not give any form of aid.

== Technique ==
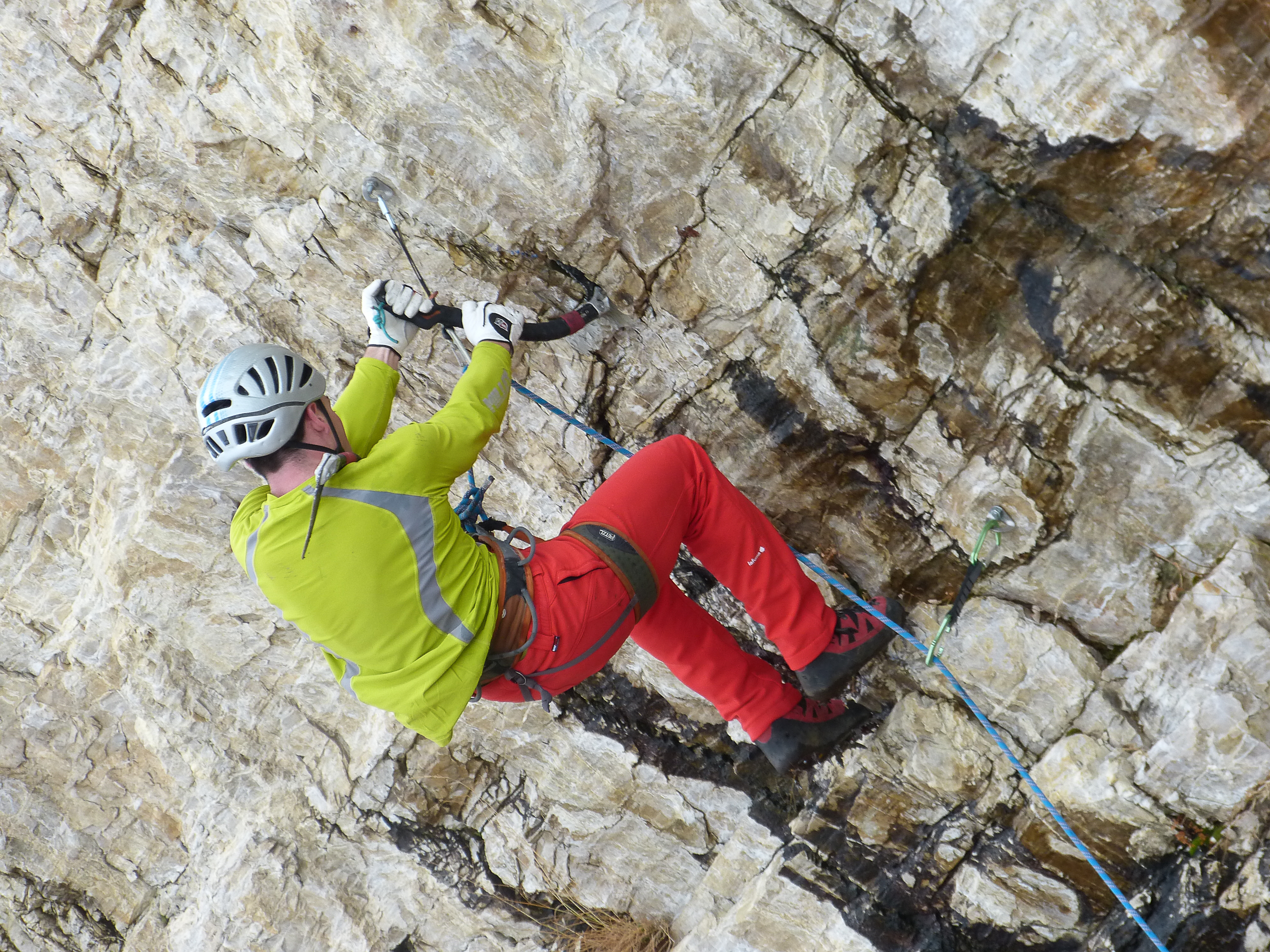
Using a stein pull

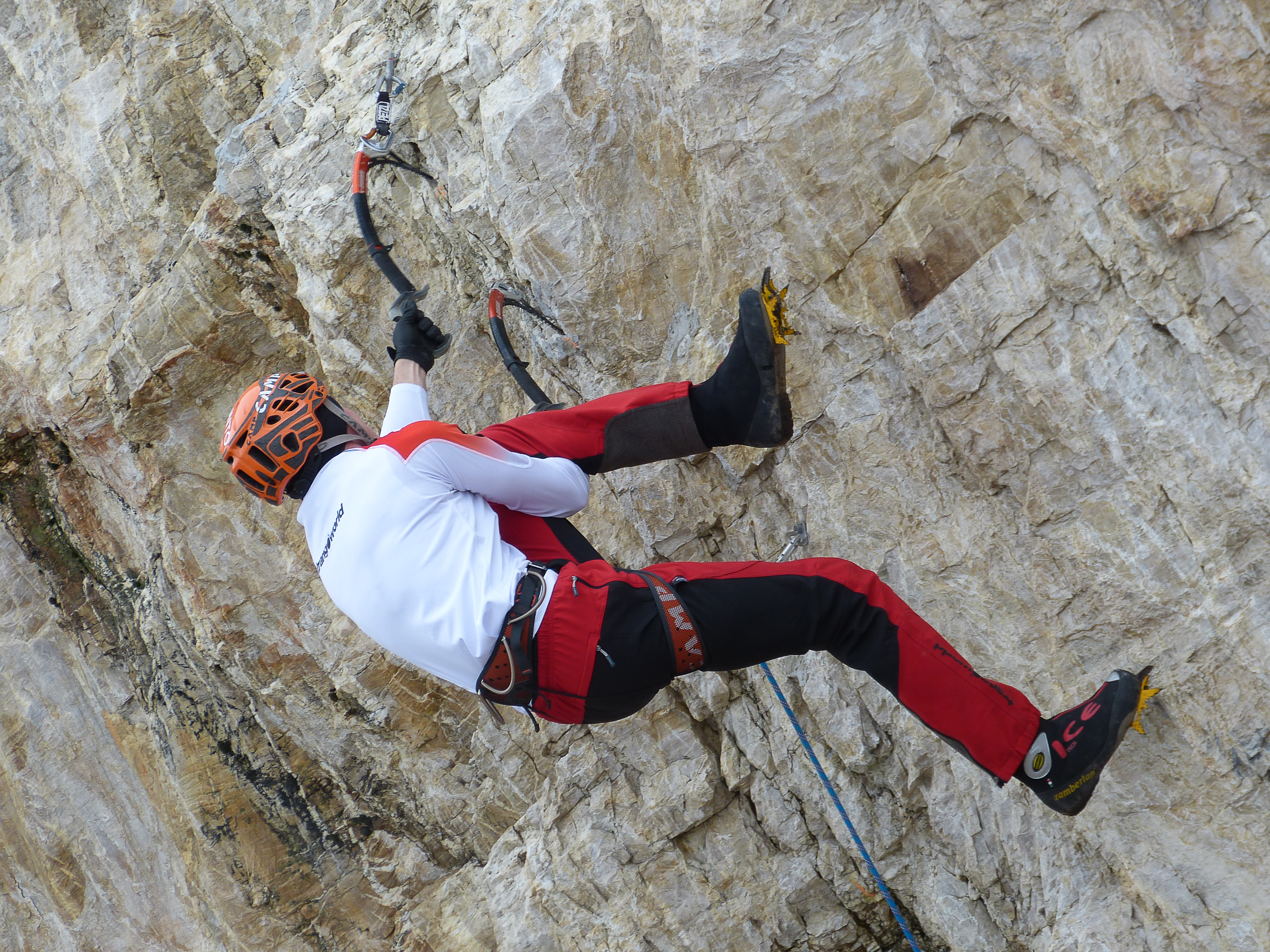
Using a figure-four move and wearing fruit boots

As well as using standard techniques of ice climbing (e.g. front pointing) and of rock climbing (e.g. crack climbing, but with ice axes), mixed climbers have developed a range of techniques that are largely unique to their sport (and the derived sport of dry-tooling). These include:

- Stein pull. Where the climber inverts their ice axe and wedges the blade upwards into cracks in the rock, gaining an upward momentum by then pulling down on the handle (with the blade wedged). Stein pulls are used frequently on overhanging sections, and for creating a resting position.
- Undercling pull. Where the climber has gone above the stein pull hold, they can either try to convert their stein pull into a mantel-type move (i.e. pushing down on the handle), or they can re-set the axe blade into an undercling pull where they pull themselves into the rock; an advanced technique requiring energy.
- Torque pull. Where the climber wedges the blade of their ice axe into a crack and then pulls sideways, thus creating "torque" between the axe and the wedged blade, enabling the climber to move upwards. Torque pulls are used frequently to ascent vertical cracks.
- Figure-four. Where the climber creates a lock-off with their arm (i.e. the ice axe is wedged into the rock, and the arm holding the axe is locked at an angle), and then uses this arm like a hold by hooking their "opposite" leg over the arm and pushing their leg down to reach upward. A figure-nine uses the "non-opposite" leg.

In addition, mixed climbers try to keep their elbows near their sides (i.e. to avoid draining energy in torque and stein pulls), and are very careful in extracting wedged blades (i.e. which can ricochet back into the climber's face), and of gently balancing the front points of their crampons on thin holds.

== Grading ==
=== M-grades ===
Graded mixed climbs

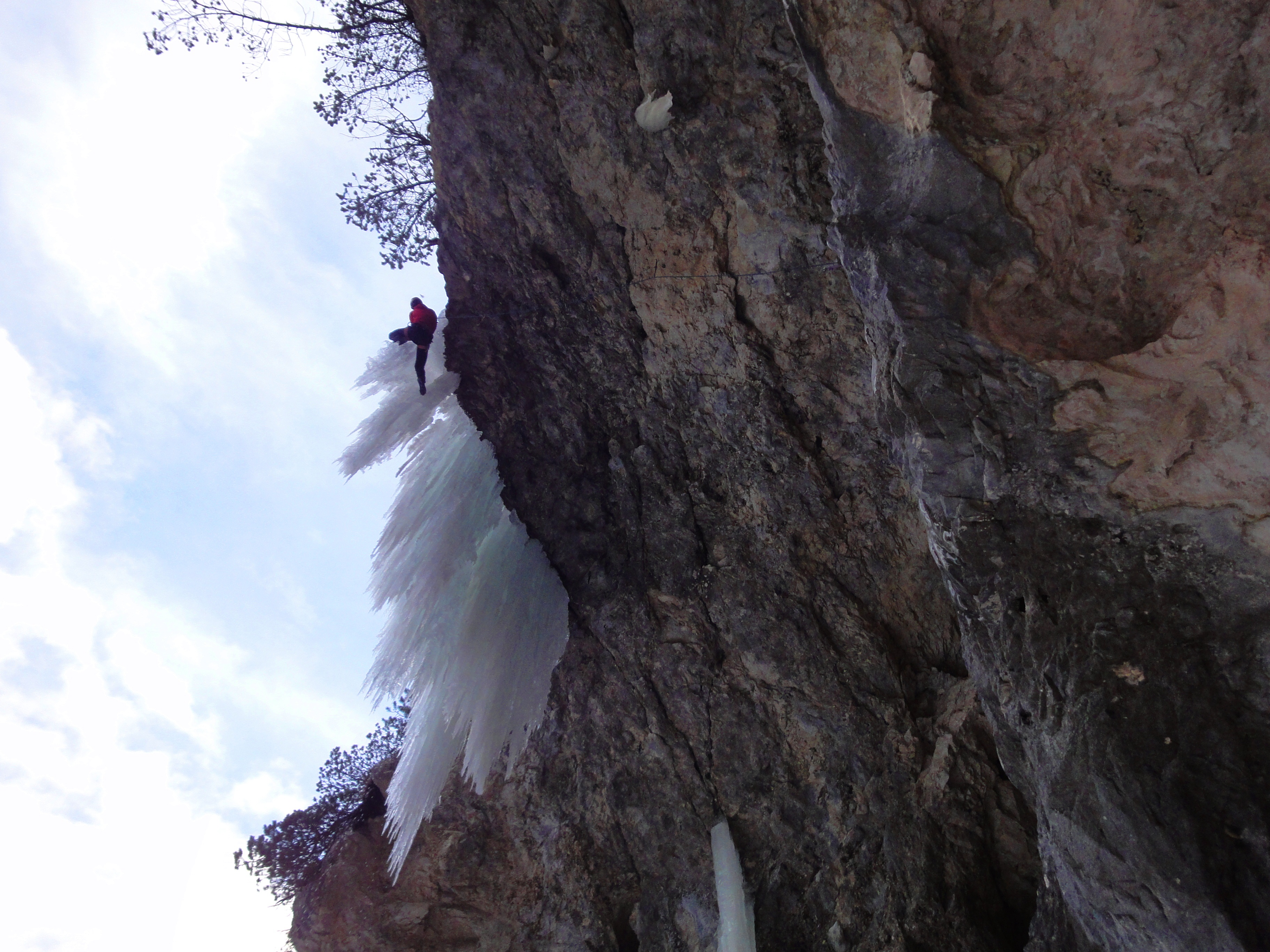
Kristoffer Szilas on Fly in the Wind (M10+), Italy

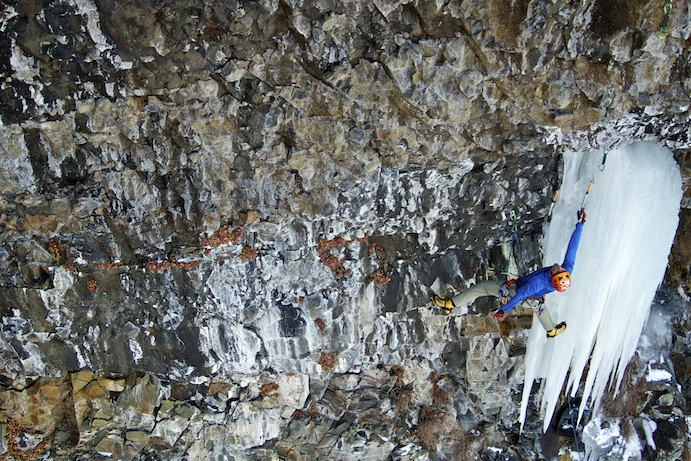
Gordon McArthur on Roman Candle (M8+), Montana

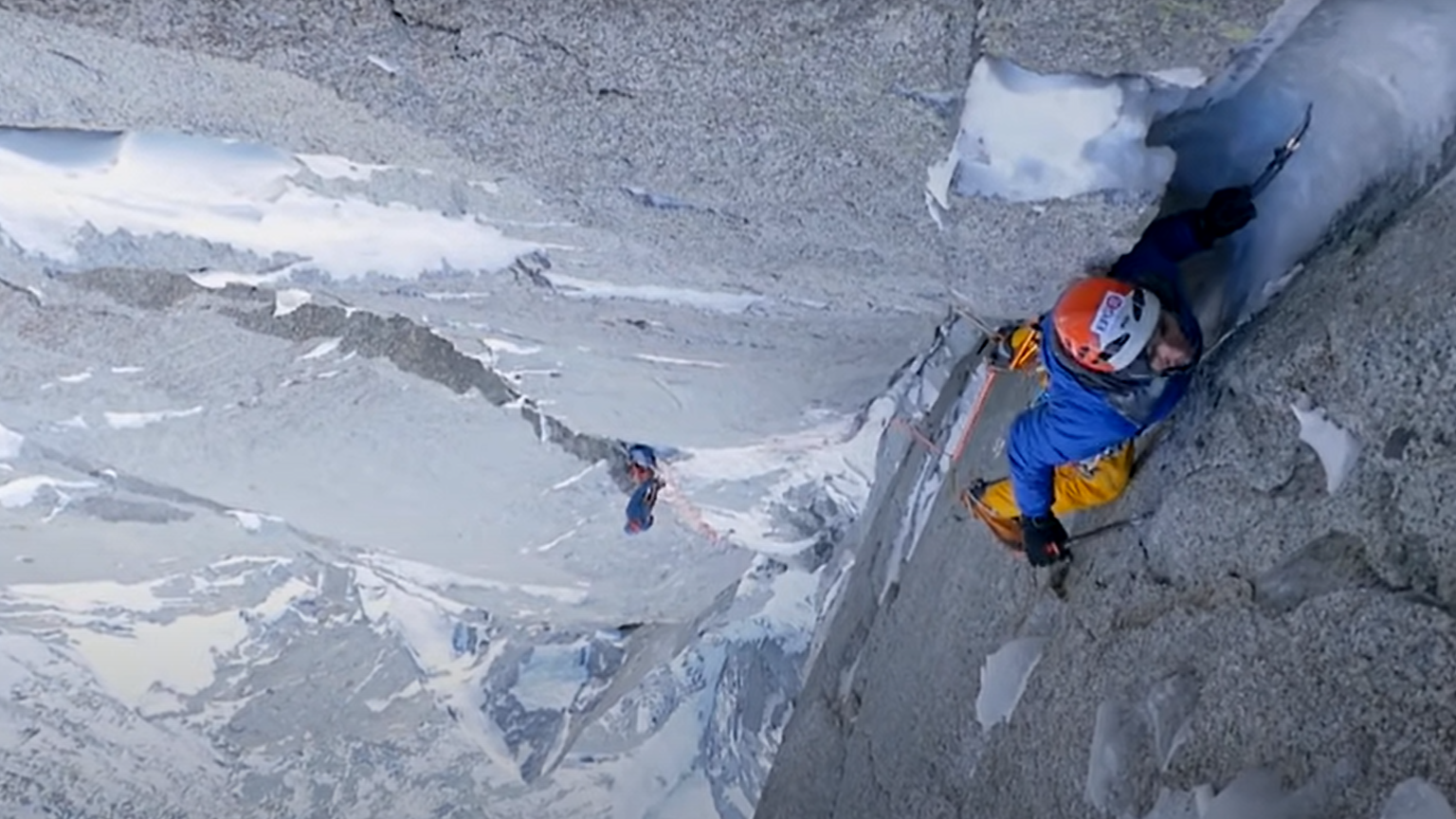
Ueli Steck on North Couloir Direct (VI, Al6+, M8), Les Drus

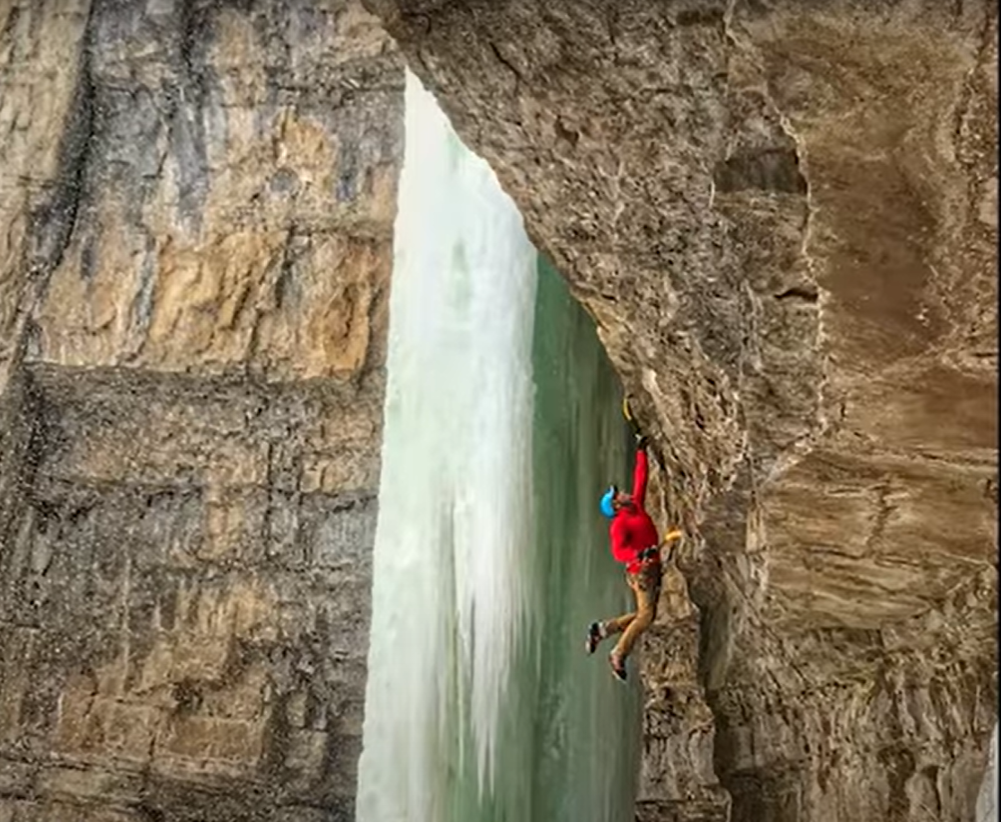
Aaron Mulkey on Devil's Doorbell (M9), Cody.

The grading of mixed routes approximates the ice climbing WI-system up to grade M6, but they then diverge as mixed routes become very overhanging and eventually turn into roofs (ice is not normally overhanging). M-grades do not take into account the "danger" of the route (i.e. how good is the protection in the event of a fall), but focus on the technical and physical challenge of the route, and is more akin to the French and US sport climbing grades, although per the US system, the "R/X" suffix is used for danger.

Some M-graded climbs are given an alternative D-grade prefix where there is no ice on the route, and it is effectively dry-tooling (e.g. the Swiss climb Iron Man is quoted as being M14+ but also D14+).

The following M-grades and descriptions are provided by the American Alpine Club (republished in 2013) who note: "These [mixed climbing] routes require considerable dry tooling (modern ice tools used on bare rock) and are climbed in crampons; actual ice is optional but some ice is usually involved":

- "M1–3: Easy. Low angle; usually no tools."
- "M4: Slabby to vertical with some technical dry tooling."
- "M5: Some sustained vertical dry tooling."
- "M6: Vertical to overhanging with difficult dry tooling."
- "M7: Overhanging; powerful and technical dry tooling; less than 10 m of hard climbing."
- "M8: Some nearly horizontal overhangs requiring very powerful and technical dry tooling; bouldery or longer cruxes than M7."
- "M9: Either continuously vertical or slightly overhanging with marginal or technical holds, or a juggy roof of 2 to 3 body lengths."
- "M10: At least 10 meters of horizontal rock or 30 meters of overhanging dry tooling with powerful moves and no rests."
- "M11: A rope length of overhanging gymnastic climbing, or up to 15 meters of roof."
- "M12–M14: With bouldery, dynamic moves and tenuous technical holds."

In his 1996 book, Ice World, Jeff Lowe ranked his new M-grades to the level of physical exertion needed on a free rock climb; Lowe estimated that M8 was equivalent to 5.12 (American Yosemite Decimal System). Other authors have tried to align M-grades with rock climbing grades, and now equate M8 to 5.10/5.11, however, there is some variation and no consensus that such comparisons are valid.

=== Scottish winter grades ===
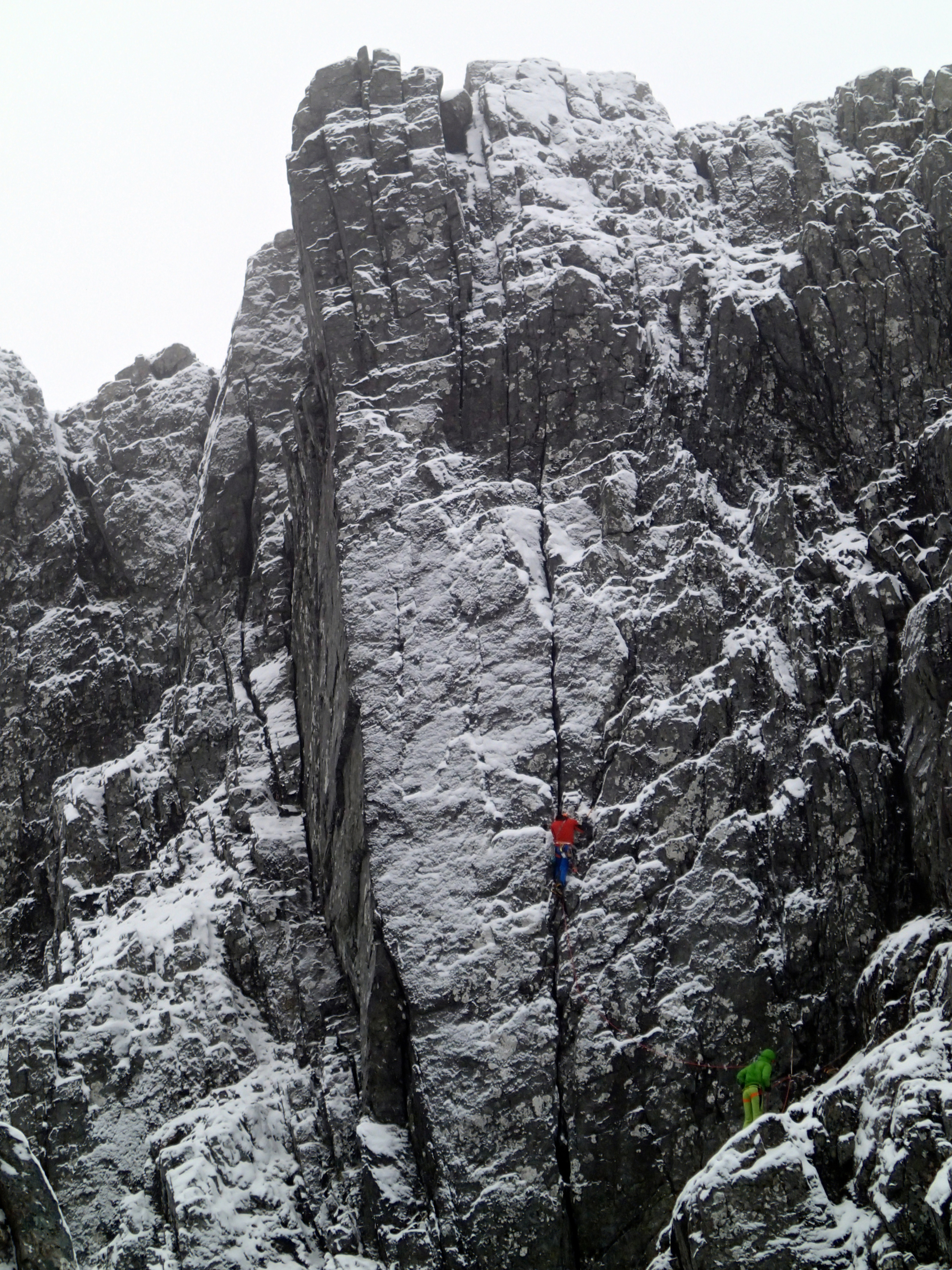
Jeff Mercier on The Secret (Grade VIII, 9), Scotland

Mixed climbing in Scotland is known as Scottish winter climbing and uses a dual-grading system with a Roman numeral to denote the overall difficulty of the route (e.g. technical challenge, length, and the level of boldness, physicality, and stamina required). A second Arabic number clarifies the technical difficulty of the hardest move on the route. A climb graded VI, 6 means the technical difficulty of the hardest move is standard for the overall grade, whereas a climb graded VI, 8 denotes the hardest move is above the overall grade.

This dual-grade is used as Scottish winter climbs use traditional climbing protection, placing greater strains on the climber. British mixed-climber Ian Parnell wrote in his guide to Scottish winter climbing that Scottish grades are almost two levels above M-grades, and thus a Scottish VIII, 8 is similar to an M6; but that an on-sight of a Scottish VIII, 8 using traditional climbing protection, is similar in difficulty to a bolted sport climbing M8.

The American Alpine Club (republished in 2013) listed the following description of Scottish winter grades:

- "Grade I: Snow gullies and easy ridges."
- "Grade II: Steep snow where two ice tools may be required but technical difficulties are short."
- "Grade III: More sustained than Grade II. Mixed ascents of moderate rock routes."
- "Grade IV: Steep ice with short vertical steps or long pitches up to 70º, or mixed routes requiring advanced techniques."
- "Grade V: Sustained ice to 80º or mixed climbs with linked hard moves."
- "Grade VI: Vertical ice and highly technical mixed routes."
- "Grade VII: Multi-pitch routes with long sections of vertical or thin ice, or mixed routes with lots of highly technical climbing."
- "Grade VIII and above: The hardest routes in Scotland."

== Evolution of grade milestones ==
The following mixed climbs are particularly notable in the evolution of mixed climbing grade milestones and mixed climbing standards.

- 1994. Octopussy WI6 M8 R Fang Amphitheater Vail, USA. First ascent was in 1994 by Jeff Lowe and is considered the first M8 in mixed climbing history, and also the route that gave birth to the sport of mixed climbing; was only partially bolted and carries an "R" suffix.
- 1997. Amphibian WI5+ M9 Fang Amphitheater Vail, USA. First ascent in 1997 by Will Gadd and was the first M9 in mixed climbing.
- 1997. 009 M9 Valsavarenche, Val di Cogne, Italy. First ascent was in 1997 by Stevie Haston and is considered one of the first M9s in mixed climbing; although now considered to be closer to M8+.
- 1997. Fatman and Robin M9 (also D9) Fang Amphitheater Vail, USA. First ascent was in 1997 by Pete Takeda and Jeff Lowe and is considered one of the first M9s in mixed climbing history; almost a full dry-tooling route with little ice.

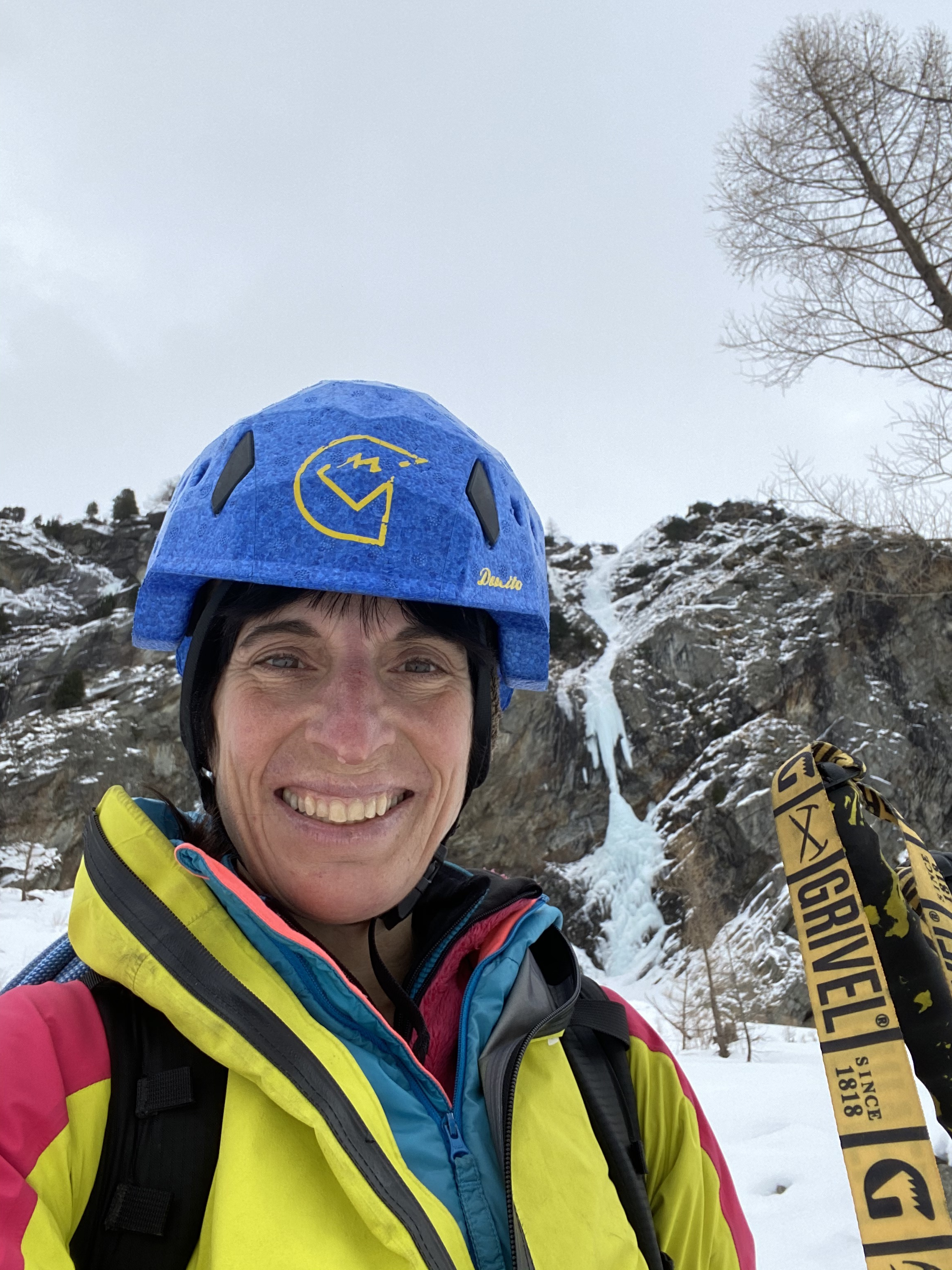
Anna Torretta on completing X-Files (background), 2021

- 1998. X-Files M10 Val di Cogne, Italy. First ascent was in 1998 by Stevie Haston and is considered the first M10 in mixed climbing history; the grade has probably softened to M9+ over time.
- 1998. Reptile WI4 M10 Fang Amphitheater Vail, USA. First ascent was in 1998 by Will Gadd and is considered one of the first M10s in mixed climbing; the grade has probably softened to M9+ over time.
- 2000. Empire Strikes Back M11 Valsavaranche, Val di Cogne, Italy. First ascent was in 2000 by Stevie Haston and is considered the first M11 in mixed climbing; although now considered to be closer to M10+.
- 2001. Misson Impossible M11 Valsavaranche, Val di Cogne, Italy. First ascent was in 2001 by Will Gadd and is considered one of the first M11s in mixed climbing history, and is still recognized as a "benchmark" climb for the grade.
- 2001. Musashi M12 Cineplex Cave, Alberta, Canada. First ascent was in 2001 by Will Gadd and is considered the first M12 in mixed climbing history, and is still recognized as a "benchmark" climb for the grade.
- 2003. Vertical Limits M12 Ueschinen, Kandersteg, Switzerland. First ascent was in 2003 by Robert Jasper and is considered the earliest M12s in mixed climbing history, and is still recognized as a classic testpiece for the grade.
- 2003. The Game M13 Cineplex Cave, Alberta, Canada. First ascent was in 2003 by Ben Firth and is considered one of the first M13s in mixed climbing history; reclimbed in 2005 by Evgeny Krivosheytsev and by Will Gadd without heel spurs as The Game Reloaded, as part of Gadd's drive to reduce climbing aids in mixed climbing, and regraded it to M13+.
- 2006. Steel Koan M13+ Cineplex Cave, Alberta, Canada. First ascent was in 2006 by Will Gadd and is considered one of the first M13+s in mixed climbing history, and was done without heel spurs (i.e. "bareback style").
- 2012. Iron Man M14+ Eptingen, Switzerland. First ascent was in 2012 by Robert Jasper and is considered the first M14+ in mixed climbing history; Japer climbed it in completely dry conditions, grading it D14+, and later again in iced conditions, grading it M14+.

=== Female grade milestones ===
Many leading female mixed climbers are competition ice climbers from the UIAA Ice Climbing World Cup tour, however, despite their smaller grouping, on occasions, female mixed climbers have set grade milestones that closely matched the highest male grades at the time:

- 2007. Law and Order M13 Diebsöfen, Austria. First female ascent was in 2007 by Ines Papert and is considered the first M13 by a female in dry-tooling history; at the time, the hardest mixed-route in the world was about M13+, being Steel Koan.
- 2013. Iron Man M14 Eptingen, Switzerland. First female ascent was in 2013 by Lucie Hrozová and is considered the first M14 by a female in mixed climbing; at the time of Hrozová's ascent Iron Man was considered the hardest route in the world.
- 2016. Saphira M15- Fang Amphitheater Vail, USA. First ascent was in 2016 by Lucie Hrozová and is considered the first M15- by a female in mixed climbing, and the first new route by a female at that grade; at the time, it was the hardest route in North America.

=== Free solo ===
A number of mixed climbers have set new grade milestones in a free solo climbing style (i.e. no protection such as ice screws or bolts):

- 2020. Nutcracker M9 WI5+ Hyalite Canyon, Montana. Free solo in 2020 by Matt Cornell, one the first-ever M9 solos.

== See also ==
- Glossary of climbing terms
- Alpine climbing
- Dry-tooling
- Ice climbing
