= Steve House (climber) =

American sport coach, author, entrepreneur, mountaineer and mountain guide

Steve House (born August 4, 1970) is an American mountain sport coach, author, entrepreneur, retired professional alpinist, and mountain guide. He won the 2006 Piolet d'Or. After a near fatal accident in 2010 he stopped hard climbing, saying that he wanted to share all the training knowledge resources he had learned and that he wished he had in his youth. He wrote Training for the New Alpinism and is the owner and manager of Uphill Athlete, providing training resources for mountain athletes including trail runners, alpinists, mountaineers, and skiers.

== Early life and education ==
House earned a Bachelor of Science in ecology from The Evergreen State College in 1995.

== Climbing career ==
=== Alpine climbing ===
Reinhold Messner called House "The best climber in the world".

He has said that while he dislikes being called the best, he is happy to be noted as among the most influential climbers.

Alaska

He first climbed Denali as an assistant guide in 1992. In 1995 he made the first ascent of the 2,000-meter high Father and Sons Wall with Eli Helmuth in a nonstop ascent lasting 36 hours. The following year he soloed a technical and difficult new route on the nearby NE face of the West Buttress. As of 2024 neither route has been repeated.

In 1996 he made the first known solo attempt of the Moonflower Buttress on Mt Hunter following the original Mugs Stump start.

In 1998 with Steve Swenson the two opened a new route on a 1,200-meter high buttress near the head of the east fork of the Kahiltna Glacier which they named Mascioli’s Pillar.

He is thought to be the only climber in history to have established three new routes on North America's highest peak. He has climbed Denali around 25 times as both an alpinist and a mountain guide.

In 2001 with Rolando Garibotti he made the fourth ascent of the Infinite Spur route on Mt Foraker in 25 hours (plus another 20 to basecamp).

House established, with various partners, new routes on the Alaska Range's smaller peaks including the East Face of the Moose's Tooth (with Mahoney and Gilmore) and Mt Bradley (Twight and Carpenter) and made the first repeat of the 1972 southeast pillar of Mt Dickey (Hollenbaugh).

As a mountain guide House executed first guided ascents of Peak 11,300 and the Moonflower Buttress of Mt Hunter.

Canada

House made many notable ascents in the Canadian Rockies including many ice and mixed routes and shorter alpine routes. His most significant contributions include:

- Howse Peak via the new route, M-16, Blanchard and Backes.
- North Face of North Twin in winter (approx two weeks outside calendar winter season) via House-Prezelj variant of the 1972 route with Prezelj
- Saskatchewan massif via the Silver Lining with Josephson and Blanchard
- Mount Alberta via the Anderson-House
- Mount Robson via the Haley-House route on the Emperor Face of Mt Robson

Himalaya/Karakoram

House's first expedition was in 1990 to Nanga Parbat with the Slovenian Alpine Association. Besides celebrating his 20th birthday there he reached 6,200 meters in support of two successful climbers (Frantar and Rozman).

In 1994 he attempted Thalay Sagar but turned around at 6,000m (partner unknown).

In 1999 he attempted the east ridge of Gasherbrum 4 from the Gasherbrum glacier. (Swenson, DeKlerk, Mace)

In 2001 he climbed Cho Oyu in a single day (circa 18 hours) without supplemental oxygen or other aids.

In 2002 he attempted the south face of then-unclimbed Nuptse East (Blanchard, Prezelj) but he and Prezelj were turned back by strong winds on their final push.

In 2003 he attempted the north pillar of Masherbrum (Prezelj, Jost). After that experience he returned alone to the Charakusa Valley where he did the first ascent of a very technical new route in 23 hours round trip where he utilized rope soloing techniques. He named the peak Hajji Brakk in honor of his friend Hajji Rasool of Hushe. He then started trying to climb K7 main, making three attempts and reaching over 6,000 meters on the last attempt of the season.

2004 Kapura Peak, 6,490m. First ascent with Swenson and Miller. K7, 6942m. On his fourth attempt House made the second ascent, solo, by a new route. The climb was highly technical and earned him a nomination for the Piolet d’Or. He won the audience prize that year.

Nanga Parbat, 8,125m, Rupal Face attempt. With Miller the pair pioneered a new route to 7,500m and descended the harrowingly difficult face in poor weather.

2005. Nanga Parbat, 8,125m, Rupal Face, successful climb. With Vince Anderson he completed a new route, in alpine style up the Central Pillar of the Rupal Face. The pair were the first North Americans to win the Piolet d’Or.

This climb became the climax of his first book, Beyond the Mountain.

2006. Kunyang Chish, 7,821m. With Anderson they turned back approximately 50 meters below the summit after a four day aline style attempt.

2007. K7 West, 6,800m. With Anderson and Prezelj they made the first ascent of this mountain in alpine style over three days.

In the autumn of 2008, the spring of 2009, and the spring of 2011 House made three expeditions to Nepal to attempting West Face of Makalu.

On March 25, 2010, while on a training climb in preparation for an attempt on a new route on the west face of K2 with Ueli Steck he was climbing with Miller on Mount Temple, when House fell 25 meters. He smashed six ribs in multiple places resulting in 25 fractures, collapsed his right lung, badly lacerated his spleen, fractured his pelvis in two places, and fractured several vertebrae in his spine. Barely a year later and after months of rehabilitation, House set off for the Himalayas to climb Makalu, the fifth-highest mountain in the world.

He is vocal in his support of alpine style climbs, which involve moving quickly with little equipment and leaving no gear on the mountain. When, in 2004, the Russian team won the 14th Piolet d'Or for their ascent of the north face of Jannu, he criticized the team for using months to climb the face while setting up fixed ropes, and for leaving 77 ropes and multiple camps behind on the mountain.

=== Other activities ===
He became a Union Internationale des Associations de Guides de Montagnes-certified guide since 1999, and the seventh American Mountain Guides Association (AMGA) guide to complete the certification. He retired from guiding in 2018. Beginning in 1999 he worked as an ambassador for the technical outdoor clothing company, Patagonia, with input on marketing and product design, development, and testing. In an Instagram post in January 2021 he announced his retirement from all his sponsors. He wrote: "at 50 years old it is time to step aside and make room for a new generation of alpinists, and their vision of alpinism, whatever that may be." In 2015 he founded Uphill Athlete.

== Author ==
His book Beyond the Mountain was the 2009 winner of the Boardman Tasker Prize for Mountain Literature. In 2015 he and Scott Johnston published Training for the New Alpinism and The New Alpinism Training Log came out in 2017. In 2019 Steve, Scott Johnston, and Kilian Jornet published Training for the Uphill Athlete which has over 1,100 reviews on Amazon with an average user rating of 4.8.

== Notable climbs ==
- 2000 Slovak Direct, Mount McKinley, Alaska Range, Alaska with Mark Twight and Scott Backes, a fast climb in 60 hours.
- 2003 The Talkeetna Standard, Eye Tooth, Alaska Range, Alaska, USA; FA V 5.9 WI5 1000m with Jeff Hollenbaugh
- 2003 Roberts-Rowell-Ward Route, Mt. Dickey, Alaska Range, Alaska, USA; second ascent VI 5.9 A2 1675m with Jeff Hollenbaugh
- 2004 Southwest Face, K7, Charakusa Valley, Karakorum, Pakistan (second ascent of the mountain, first ascent of route) (VI 5.10a M6 A2 80 degrees, 2400m), solo. For this ascent he won the People's Award for the 14th Piolet d'Or.
- 2005 June Taulliraju (5830m), Peru Steve along with Slovenian alpinist Marko Prezelj climbed the Italian Route on Taulliraju. They climbed the route free (first free ascent) in a three-day roundtrip.
- 2005 Central Pillar of the Rupal Face, (4100m, M5 X, 5.9, WI4), September 1–8, on Nanga Parbat in northern Pakistan with Vince Anderson. Completed in a little over a week (a very short period of time in comparison with many large alpine climbs), the climb won him and Anderson the Piolet d'Or. Steve House's account was published in Alpinist Magazine-Issue 16, in which he describes the ascent as the culmination of "years of a physical and psychological journey."
- 2007 House-Haley (WI5 M7 1750m), Emperor Face, Mount Robson (3956m), Canadian Rockies, British Columbia, Canada. FA of route with Colin Haley, May 25–27, 2007.
- 2007 K7 West (6858m), Charakusa Valley, Karakorum, Pakistan FA of peak with Vince Anderson and Marko Prezelj.
- 2008 House-Anderson (WI5+ M8 R/X, 1000m), North Face, Mount Alberta (3619m), Canadian Rockies, Alberta, Canada. FA of route with Vince Anderson, March 26–28, 2008
