= Steck =

Steck is a surname. Notable people with the surname include:

- Allen Steck (1926-2023), American mountaineer
- Amos Steck (1822-1908), American politician
- Anton Steck (born 1965), German violinist and conductor
- Bruno Steck (born 1957), French soccer player and manager
- Daniel F. Steck (1881–1950), American politician
- Elma Steck (1923–2014), American baseball player
- H. Tipton Steck (1888–1953) American screenwriter
- Jodie Steck (died 2025), American photojournalist
- Leo John Steck (1898–1950), American Catholic bishop
- Michael R. Steck (born 1972), American drag queen also known as Pandora Boxx
- Paul Steck (1866-1924), French painter
- Ueli Steck (1976–2017), Swiss speed mountaineer

== Fictional characters ==
- Annie Steck, a character in the American sitcom television series The Hogan Family

== See also ==
- Steck (piano), brand name of the Aeolian Piano company
- The Ferdinand Steck Maschinenfabrik, Swiss manufacturer of specialist road building and railway equipment
- The Steck-Salathé Route (Sentinel Rock), technical climbing route on Sentinel Rock
