= Solo climbing =

Style of climbing performed alone

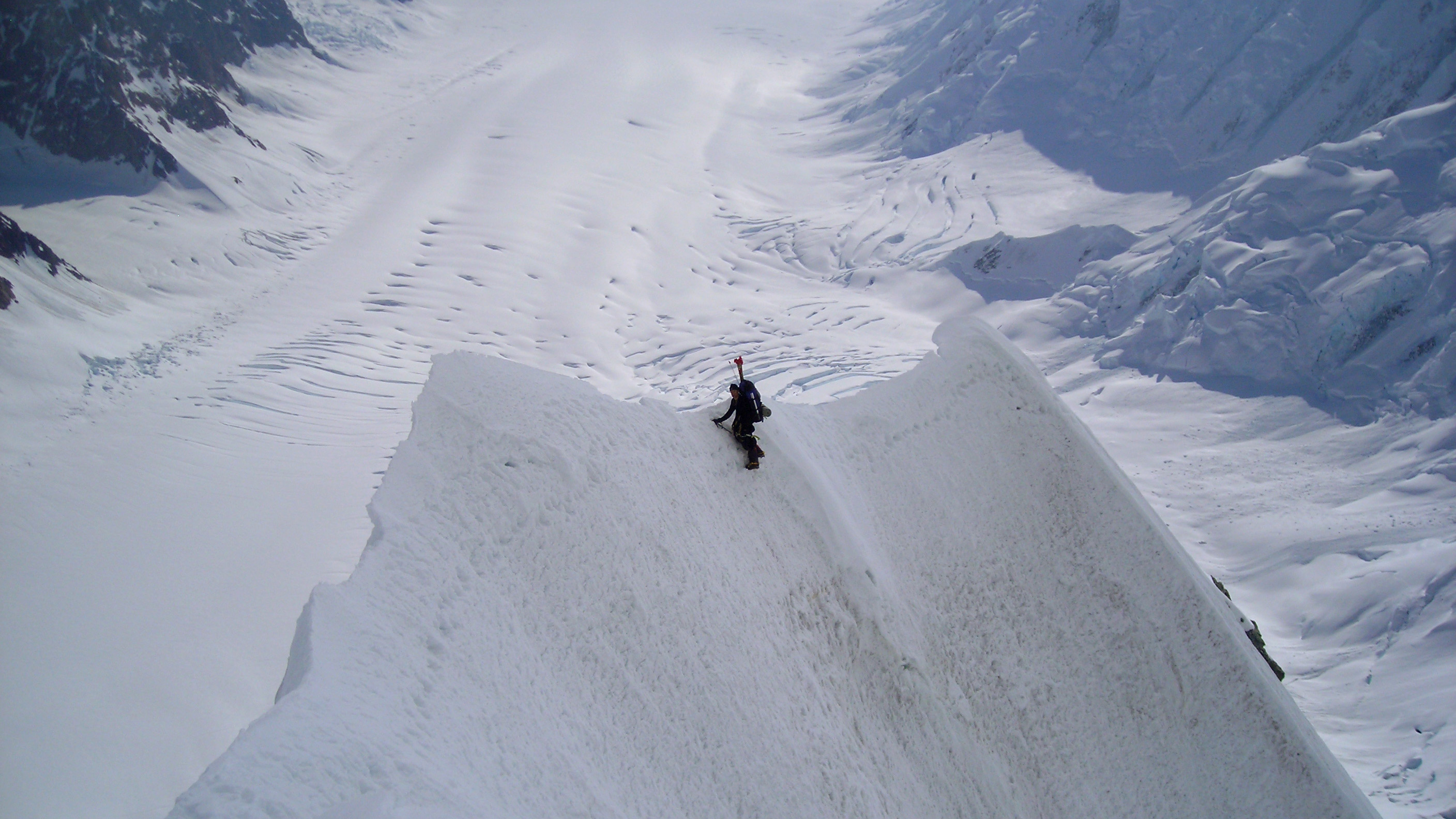
A mountaineer solo climbing on Mount Logan

Solo climbing (or soloing) is a style of climbing in which the climber ascends a climbing route alone and deliberately without the assistance of a belayer (or "second"), or being part of any rope team. By its very nature, solo climbing presents a higher degree of risk to the climber as they are entirely reliant on their own skills (e.g. climbing technique, navigation) and their own equipment to complete the climbing route – any serious problems may require a self-rescue.

Solo climbing is most common in mountaineering, and particularly in the sub-discipline of alpine climbing, and in the technical sub-discipline of rope solo climbing. The most dangerous form of solo climbing is that of free solo climbing, which means both climbing alone on steep climbing routes that would normally require climbing protection, but without using any form of climbing protection. Free solo climbing was dramatically portrayed in the climbing films Free Solo (for rock climbing) and The Alpinist (for ice climbing and for alpine climbing).

== With climbing protection ==
The following types of solo climbing use some form of climbing protection, which typically involves around a mechanical self-locking device (or progress capture/assisted braking device) that — when used properly with a rope and standard protection — reduces the risk of serious or fatal injury to the climber:

- Rope solo climbing is climbing alone but with a rope to help arrest a fall, or for a self-rescue if required. Instead of having a belayer, the climber uses a self-locking device that will hold the rope in the case of a fall, and leads the route in a traditional climbing manner, placing climbing protection as they ascend. One end of the rope is anchored below the climber and the climber pays-out the rope through the self-locking device as they ascend. Once they reach the top, they need to abseil down and re-ascend the route with an ascender, to remove the protection they placed earlier.

In 1992, French climber Catherine Destivelle used a self-locking device to rope-solo the first part of the traditional climbing route El Matador 5.10d (6b+), on the Devils Tower in Wyoming (she free soloed the second part), and was captured in the climbing film, Ballade à Devil's Tower. In 1992, Destivelle used rope solo technique to create Voie Destivelle (VI 5.11b A5) on the west face of the Petit Dru, and was captured in the climbing film, 11 Days on the Dru. In 2016, Pete Whittaker rope-soloed the 915-metre (3,002 ft) 35-pitch route Freerider in Yosemite in a single day.

- Top rope solo climbing is a form of top roping where a single static fixed rope, anchored to the top of the route, is laid along the length of the climb. The climber then clips-into the fixed rope using at least one progress capture device (PCD) such as a Petzl Micro Traxion or a Camp Lift, that will allow the rope to pay-through as the climber ascends but will grip the rope tightly in the event of a fall.
- Auto belay indoor climbing is usually a form of top roping (there are lead auto-belay devices) where the belayer is replaced by a mechanical device fixed the top (or bottom for lead auto-belay) of the route.

== Without climbing protection ==
Free solo climbing (sometimes also just called soloing) is where a solo rock climber uses no climbing protection (or any form of climbing aids), whatsoever, except for their climbing shoes and climbing chalk (for a rock-climber) or ice tools (for an ice-climber), to ascend a climbing route.

Free soloing was portrayed in an Oscar-winning documentary film, Free Solo, featuring Alex Honnold free soloing the 915-metre (3,002 ft) big wall route Freerider in Yosemite, the world's first-ever free solo of a 5.13a (7c+) big wall route.

There are a number of sub-classes of free soloing:

- Deep-water soloing (DWS), is a subtype of free solo climbing performed on rock faces that overhang above water where in the case of a fall, the climber lands in the water. Extreme deep-water solo routes have falls of over 20–40 metres (66–131 ft), and thus a risk of serious injury. Noted DWS climbers include Chris Sharma who created the world's first-ever 9a+ (5.15a) DWS route, Es Pontàs, in 2007.
- FreeBASEing, is a subtype of free solo climbing performed on long multi-pitch big wall routes with a BASE jumping parachute as the sole means of protection, where a falling climber opens their parachute to arrest their fall. FreeBASEing was pioneered by Dean Potter who made a freeBASE ascent of Deep Blue Sea (5.12+) on the north face of the Eiger in 2008.
- Highball bouldering, is where the boulder exceeds 7–10 metres (23–33 ft) in height, and therefore any fall, even where bouldering mats are used, presents a risk of serious injury. Where highball bouldering ends and free soloing begins is a source of debate amongst climbers. Notable highball boulders include Nalle Hukkataival's Livin' Large V16 (8C+) in Rocklands, South Africa.
- Free solo ice climbing can also be done in a free-solo format (e.g. without any protection, such as ice screws). Notable free solo ice climbers include Canadian Marc-Andre Leclerc, and Swiss ice climber, Dani Arnold, who has free soloed routes of grade WI7. Related to this is the activity of mixed climbing free soloing (e.g. using ice climbing equipment on routes that are a combination of ice and rock).
- Buildering, is a subtype of free solo climbing where the climber ascends a public building (or mechanical structure with crane climbing), and usually without any protection. Notable building climbers include Alain Robert (who also made world's first-ever free solo of an 8b (5.13d) climbing route), who has free soloed major buildings including the Eiffel Tower and the Burj Khalifa.

== In film ==
A number of notable films have been made focused on solo (and free solo) climbing (on rock and/or on ice) including:

- The Alpinist, a 2021 documentary film about Canadian alpinist Marc-André Leclerc, with solo, and free solo, of rock, ice, and alpine routes.
- Free Solo, a 2018 Netflix documentary film about Alex Honnold's free solo climb of Freerider 5.13a (7c+) on El Capitan.
- King Lines, a 2007 documentary film about Chris Sharma, featuring his free solo climb of the DWS route, Es Pontàs 9a+ (5.15a), in Mallorca.

== Gallery ==
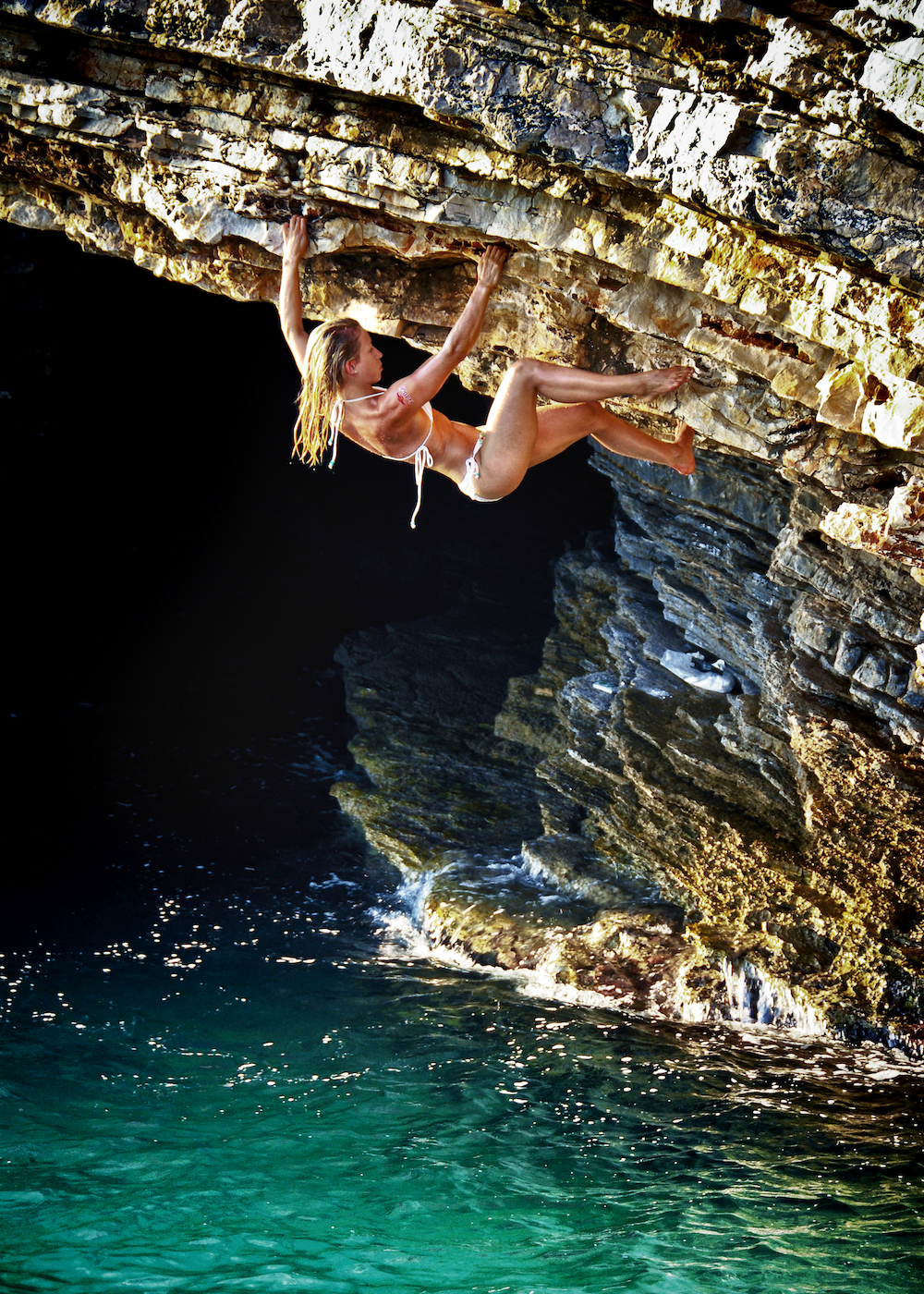
Natalija Gros deep-water soloing in Croatia

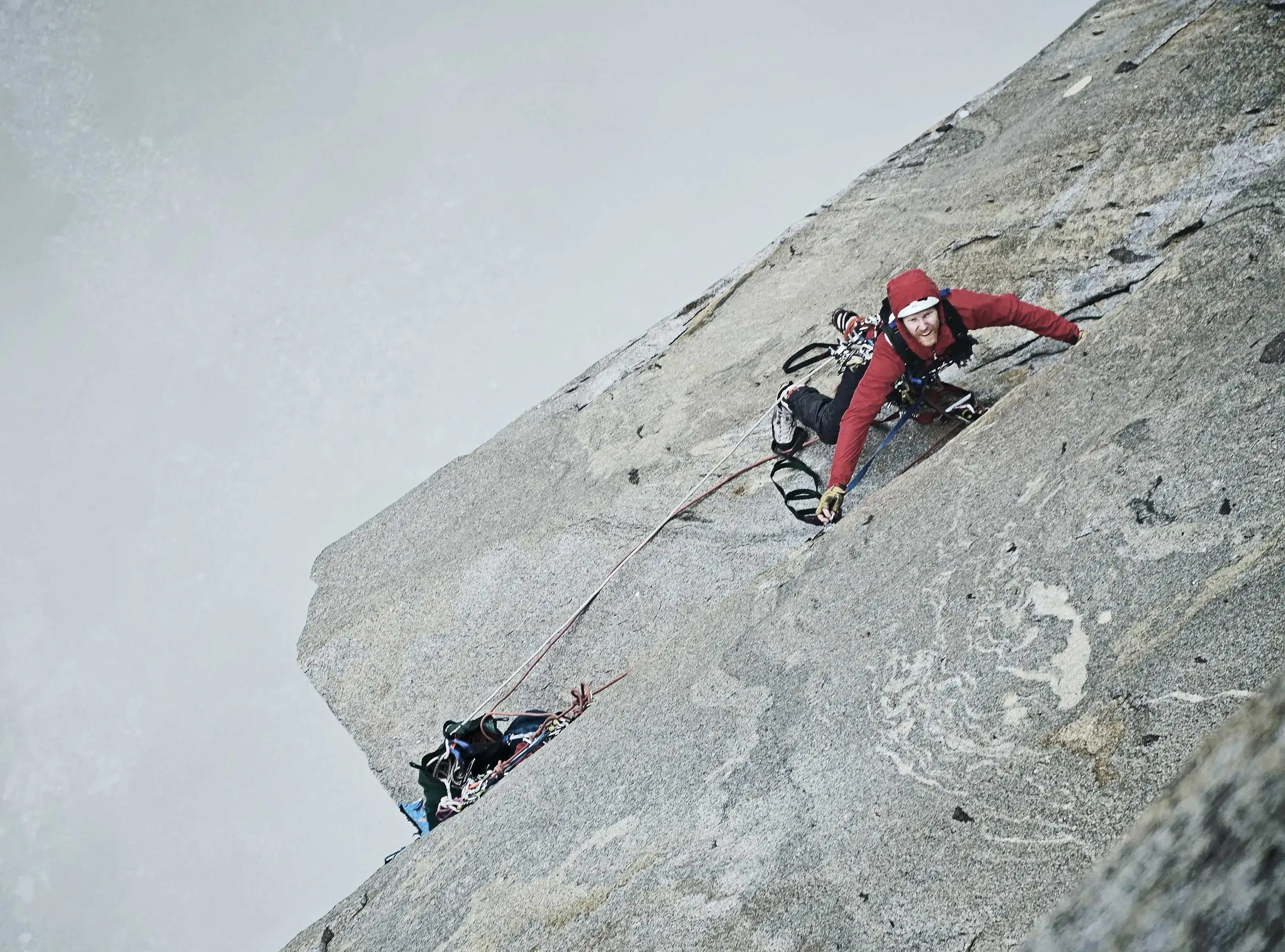
Stephen Bate rope solo climbing on El Capitan in Yosemite, California

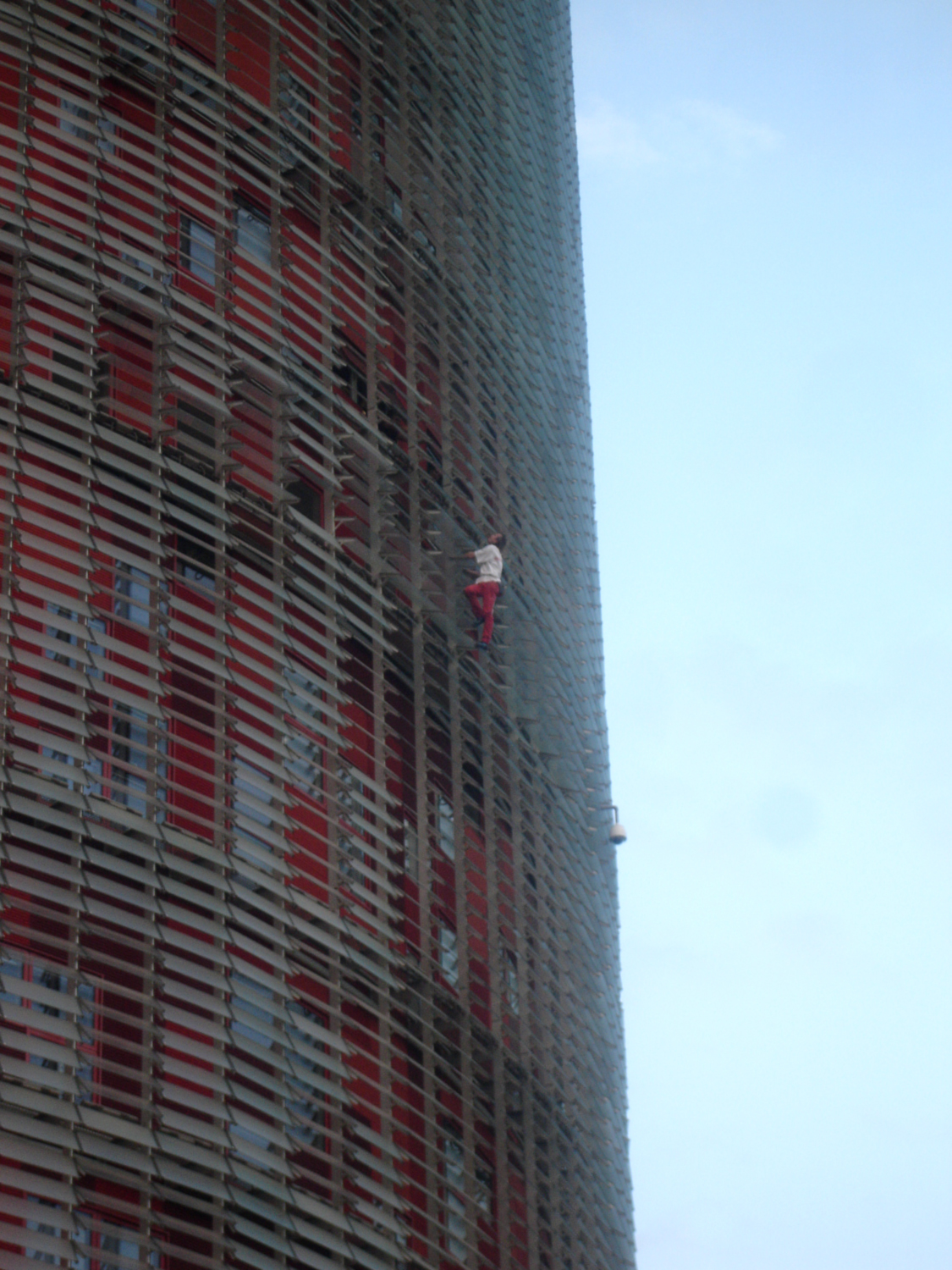
Alain Robert buildering on Torre Glòries, Barcelona

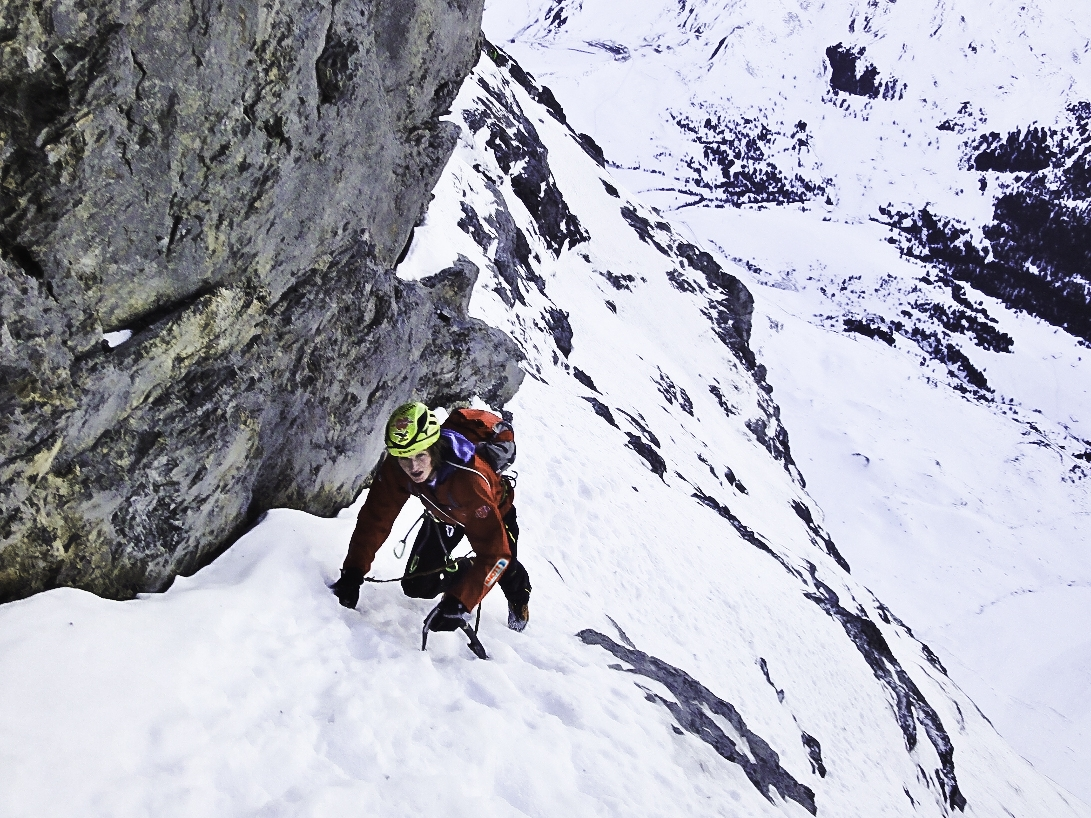
Michael Wohlleben solo alpine climbing on the north face of the Eiger, Switzerland

== See also ==
- Aid climbing, where the climber uses mechanical aids to help ascend a route (i.e. not just for protection)
- Traditional climbing, which requires the climber to place their climbing protection during the climb
- Sport climbing, that uses pre-placed bolted climbing protection
