= Free solo climbing =

Form of climbing without protection

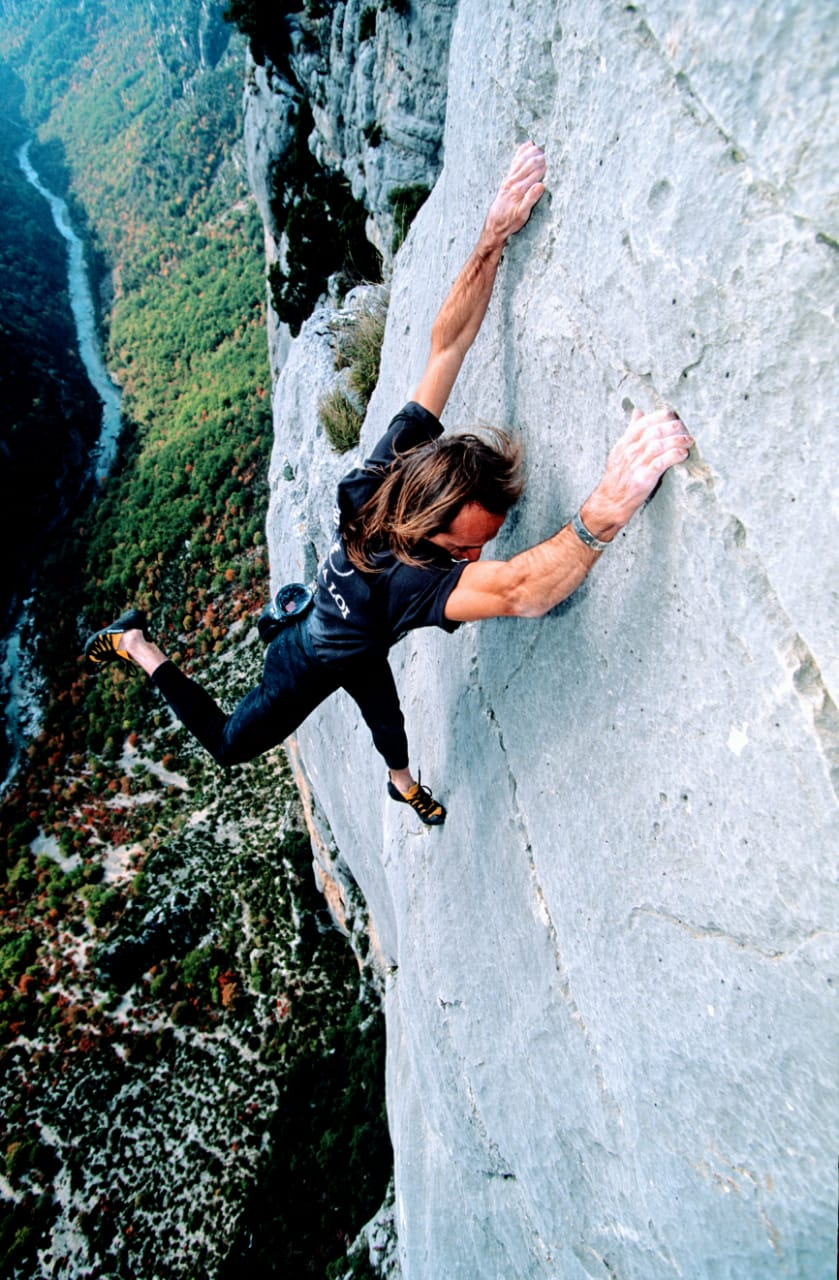
Alain Robert free soloing (on sight) the multi-pitch route, No Self Control 7a (5.11d), in the Verdon Gorge, 1991.

Free solo climbing (or free soloing) is a form of rock climbing in which the climber (or free soloist) climbs on technical terrain without ropes or any form of protective equipment — all they are allowed to use are climbing shoes and climbing chalk (or ice tools and crampons if ice climbing). Free soloing is the most dangerous form of climbing, and, unlike bouldering, free soloists climb at heights where any fall can be fatal. Though many climbers have free soloed routes with technical grades that they are very comfortable on, only a small group free solo regularly and at technical grades closer to the limit of their abilities.

The international profiles of some climbers, such as Alex Honnold, Patrick Edlinger, Marc-André Leclerc, Dean Potter, Alain Robert, Alex Huber, John Bachar, and Catherine Destivelle have been significantly increased by their free soloing activities, but others question the ethics of this and whether the risks that they are undertaking should be encouraged and commercially rewarded. While "free solo" was originally a term in climbing slang, after the popularity of the 2018 Oscar-winning film Free Solo, Merriam-Webster added the term to their English dictionary in September 2019.

In addition to being done on single-pitch and multi-pitch rock climbing routes — including the even longer big wall climbing that features in the Free Solo film — free soloing is performed in a wide range of other climbing-types, including, for example, in the disciplines of ice climbing and of mixed climbing (which is featured in the 2021 climbing documentary film The Alpinist), as well as in setting speed-climbing records on alpine climbing routes (which is featured in the 2023 climbing documentary film Race to the Summit).

== Description ==
Free solo climbing (which is sometimes just called soloing in the UK, or third-classing in the US), is where the climber uses no climbing aids (as per all free-climbing), but in addition, uses no form of climbing protection whatsover. The free solo climber may only use their climbing shoes and climbing chalk as they ascend the climbing route.

Free solo climbing is a special form of free climbing but is different from the main forms of free climbing — sport climbing and traditional climbing — that use climbing protection for safety. In theory, bouldering is also free solo climbing (i.e. it also uses no aid or protection) but is usually not referred to as such except in the case of highball bouldering, where falls can be serious. The most committing forms of free soloing are on multi-pitch — and the even longer big wall — routes, where any retreat is very difficult.

In alpine climbing the term solo climbing – as distinct from free solo climbing – is used where the climber carries a rope and some aid climbing equipment to overcome difficult sections. In addition, the term rope soloing is used for any solo climber who uses a rope and a form of self-locking device for continuous climbing protection on the route; this is also not considered as free solo climbing.

Many early 20th-century rock climbers who began to free climb (i.e., avoiding any form of aid), were often practicing free solo climbing (or rope soloing), as the effectiveness of their climbing protection (usually a rope around their waist) was minimal. In the history of rock climbing, the first ascent of Napes Needle by W. P. Haskett Smith in June 1886 – an act that is widely considered to be the start of the sport of rock climbing – was effectively a free solo. Early leaders of free climbing such as Paul Preuss, were also strongly interested in free solo climbing as being ethically purer. The 1958 ascent by Don Whillans of Goliath, one of the world's first E4 5c routes at the time (harder today), was effectively a free solo (with a rope around his waist). By the 1970s, when climbing protection was sufficiently developed to be effective, the discipline of free solo climbing began to stand apart.

For the general public, the first major discovery regarding free solo climbing was the landmark film La Vie Au Bout Des Doigts —a French documentary directed by Jean-Paul Janssen and released in 1982. Premiering in France on December 11, 1982, this pioneering film follows French climber Patrick Edlinger as he free-solos at La Piade (Toulon) and on the cliffs of Buoux. It played a major role in popularizing free climbing and solo climbing among the general public.

== Public view ==
Many climbers praise free soloing, while others have concerns regarding the danger and the message the ascents send to other climbers. Many companies have taken these views into account when working with free soloists. Clif Bar, the nutrition bar company with long ties to climbing, dropped the sponsorship of five climbers in 2014, citing the risks they take and stirring a debate about how much risk should be rewarded.

However, The North Face and Red Bull have promoted free soloists and helped the free soloing community grow. In addition, Alex Honnold, a free soloist who was previously dropped by Clif Bar, was featured in the 2018 documentary Free Solo, which was met with critical acclaim and won the Academy Award for Best Documentary Feature. The director of Free Solo, Jimmy Chin, talks in the film about the ethics of undertaking the documentary, and the effect that his film team and project could have had on the outcome.

Even in the climbing community, free soloing is controversial. In 2022, when Climbing did a feature on free soloing, they caveated all articles with: "This article is not an endorsement of the practice", and emphasized that in their research amongst climbers, it was only practiced by a very small minority, with many telling Climbing: "I have in the past but not anymore".

In 2022, climbing author and occasional free soloist Jeff Smoot wrote All and Nothing: Inside Free Soloing, which explored through interviews why some rock climbers free solo, including analyzing his own motivations. He described the feeling of self-control over one's fears as a form of addiction that had brought benefits to his life outside of climbing. He also found a wider range of motivations than he expected telling The Seattle Times, "Are free soloists crazy? They may be. Are they crazier than anybody else? I don’t think so, just in a different way".

== Notable climbers ==
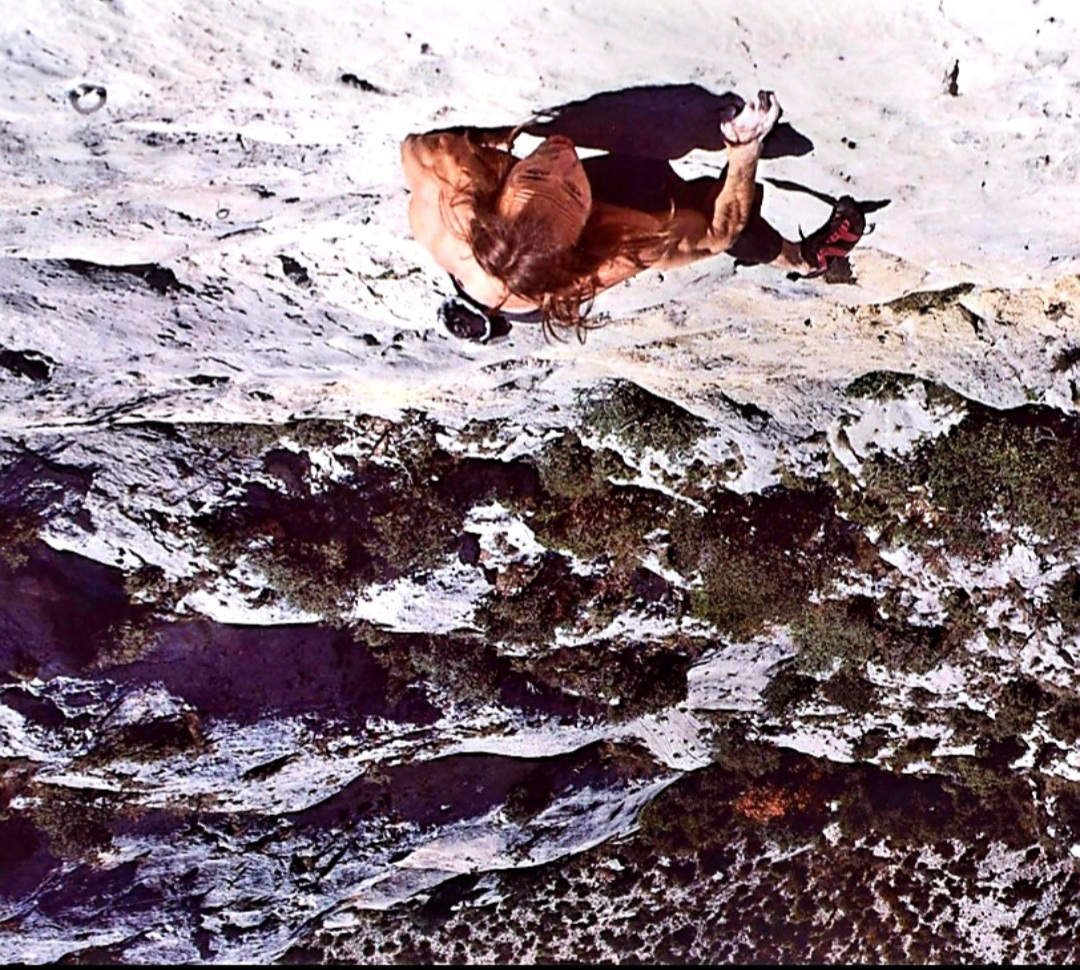
Alain Robert free solo of Pol Pot (5.12d, 7c), Verdon Gorge, 1996

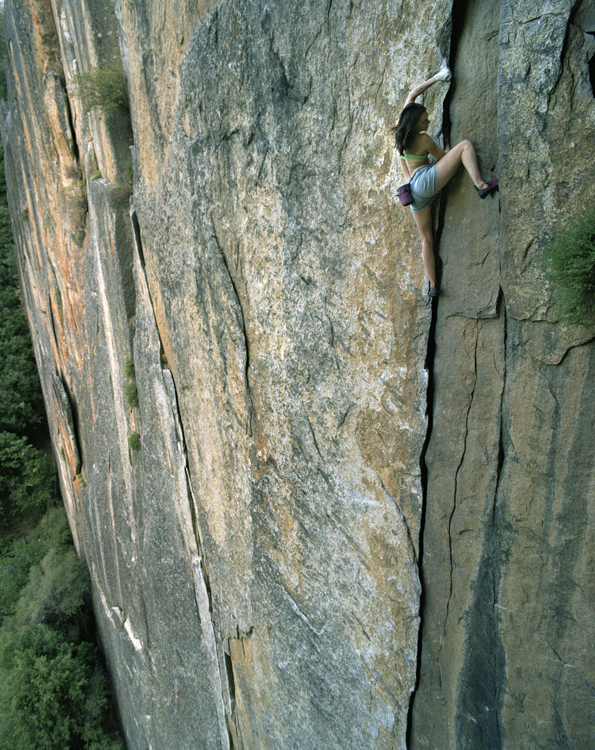
Steph Davis free solo of Outer Limits (5.10c), Yosemite, c2002

While many rock climbers have free soloed routes (single-pitch or big wall/multi-pitch), at climbing grades well below their ability, a very small minority have practiced free soloing regularly, and at grades closer to their overall limits. The most prominent of this smaller group are those who have broken new grade milestones in free solo climbing and gained a significant profile from their soloing:

- Alex Honnold – the most prolific and well-known free soloist of the 21st century, whose 2017 free solo of the route Freerider 5.13a (7c+) on El Capitan became the iconic film, Free Solo. He also successfully free solo climbed Taipei 101, becoming the highest urban free solo climber in history.
- Hansjörg Auer – the prolific big wall and high-altitude big wall free soloist, whose 2007 free solo of Fish Route on Marmolada was then the most daring in climbing history.
- Michael Reardon – prolific free soloist whose on sight 2005 free solo of Romantic Warrior won him National Geographic's "Adventurer of the Year".
- Alexander Huber – one of the strongest rock climbers of the 1990s who set free solo grade milestones in single-pitch free soloing (with Kommunist), and big wall free soloing (with the Brandler-Hasse Direttissima).
- Alain Robert – the early 1990s and 2000s pioneer of buildering, but who also broke important new free solo grade milestones in the 1990s.
- Patrick Edlinger – leading European free soloist of the 1980s, with multi-pitch free solos in the Cimaï, Verdon Gorge and Buoux.
- Wolfgang Güllich – one of the strongest rock climbers of the late 1980s who set free solo milestones (Weed Killer), and did the iconic solo of Separate Reality.
- Catherine Destivelle – a leading female climber of the late 1980s, who made iconic free solos in single-pitch (El Matador), and big wall (Bonatti Pillar).
- Antoine Le Menestrel – prolific free soloist whose 1985 free solo of Revelations set a grade milestone in free solo climbing.
- Peter Croft – a prolific Canadian free soloist of the 1980s, who pioneered big wall free soloing with The Rostrum and Astroman.
- John Bachar – a free solo "superstar" and prolific American soloist of the late 1970s/early 1980s, who pioneered multi-pitch soloing (Nabisco Wall).

In addition, several other free solo practitioners are considered historically notable in free solo climbing and include the following: Claudio Barbier, Ron Fawcett, Dan Goodwin, Colin Haley, Derek Hersey, Jimmy Jewell, Cesare Maestri, Dave MacLeod, Reinhold Messner, Dan Osman, Dean Potter, Paul Preuss, Tobin Sorenson and Georg Winkler.

Free soloing is less common amongst female rock climbers. However, as well as Catherine Destivelle, the following female climbers are historically notable free solo practitioners: Steph Davis and Brette Harrington, both of whom have free soloed single-pitch and big wall routes, and Aleksandra Taistra.

== Evolution of grade milestones ==
=== Single-pitch routes ===
- 2021 : Relatively unknown Italian climber Alfredo Webber, aged 52, free soloed Panem et Circenses in Arco, Italy, first-ever free solo of an 8c (5.14b).
- 2004 : Alexander Huber free soloed Kommunist in the Tyrol, Austria; the first-ever free solo at grade 8b+ (5.14a).
- 1993 : Alain Robert free soloed Compilation in Omblèze, France; the first-ever free solo of an 8b (5.13d) graded route.
- 1987 : Jean-Christophe Lafaille free soloed Rêve de gosse, at La Roche-des-Arnauds, France; the first-ever free solo at 8a+ (5.13c).
- 1986 : Wolfgang Güllich free soloed Weed Killer, at Raven Tor, in the Peak District, first-ever free solo at 7c (5.12d); that same year, Gullich also did the iconic solo of Separate Reality 7a+ (5.12a).
- 1985 : Antoine Le Menestrel free soloed Revelations, at Raven Tor, Peak District, the first-ever free solo at 8a (5.13b); considered a feat that was ahead of its time.
- 1982 : John Bachar free soloed Baby Apes, at Joshua Tree National Park, probably the first-ever free solo at 7b (5.12b).
- 1961 : John Gill free soloed—onsight—the first ascent of Thimble, the first-ever redpoint, and thus the first-ever free solo, at 7a+ (5.12a).

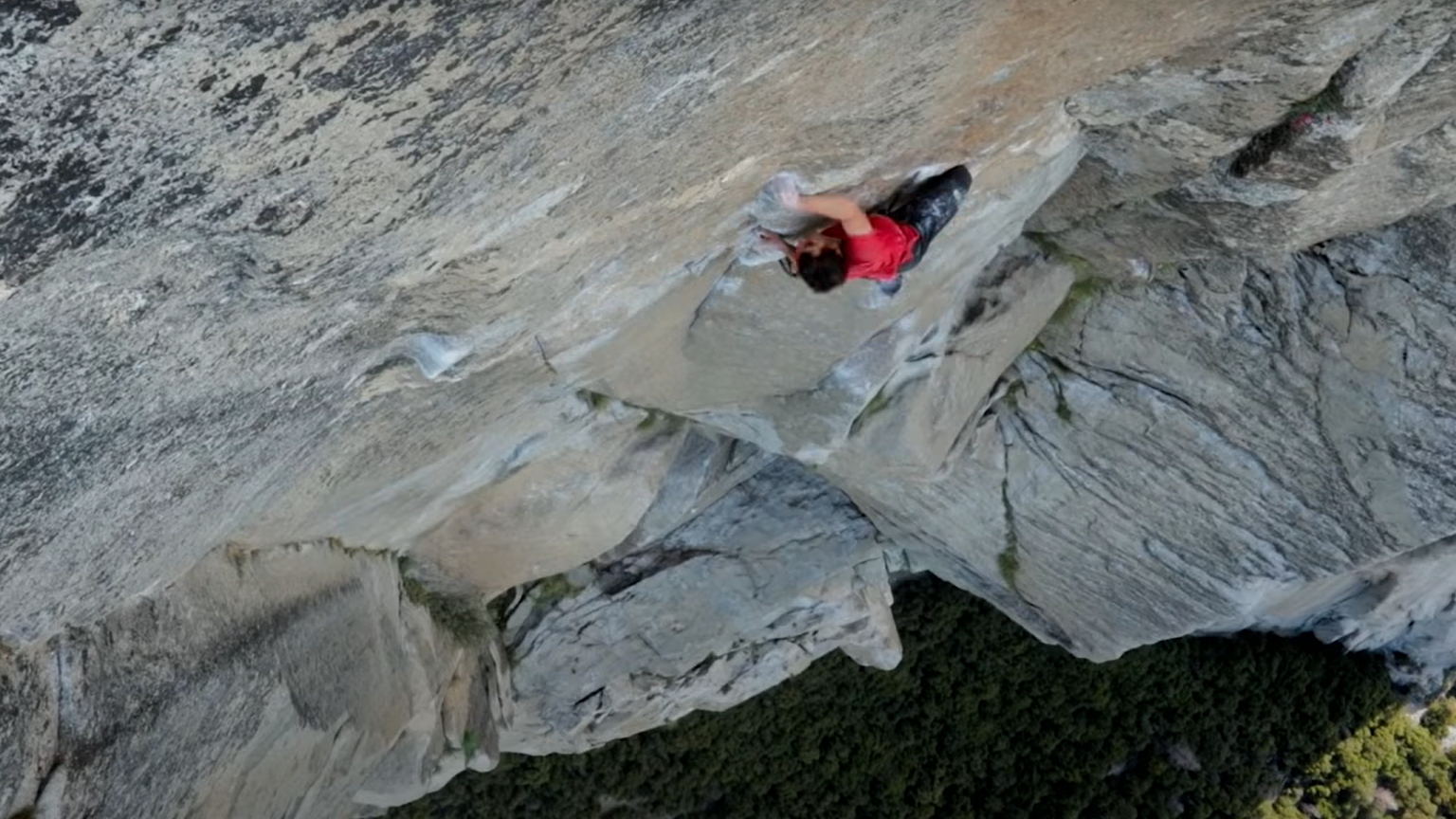
Alex Honnold's famous 2017 free solo of the big wall climbing route, Freerider (5.13a, 7c+), on El Capitan in Yosemite

=== Big wall, multi-pitch routes ===
- 2017 : Alex Honnold free soloed El Capitan via Freerider, first-ever big wall solo at 5.13a (7c+); becomes Oscar-winning film, Free Solo).
- 2007 : Hansjörg Auer free soloed Fish Route, on Marmolada, in the Dolomites, Italy, first-ever big wall solo at 5.12c (7b+) (35-pitches).
- 2005 : Michael Reardon free soloed, onsight, Romantic Warrior in the Sierra Nevada, USA, first-ever big wall solo at 5.12b (7b) (10-pitches); wins National Geographic "Adventurer of the Year".
- 2002 : Alexander Huber free soloed, the 1,500 ft Hasse-Brandler on the Cima Grande, Dolomites, first-ever big wall solo at 5.12a (7a+).

== Climber fatalities ==
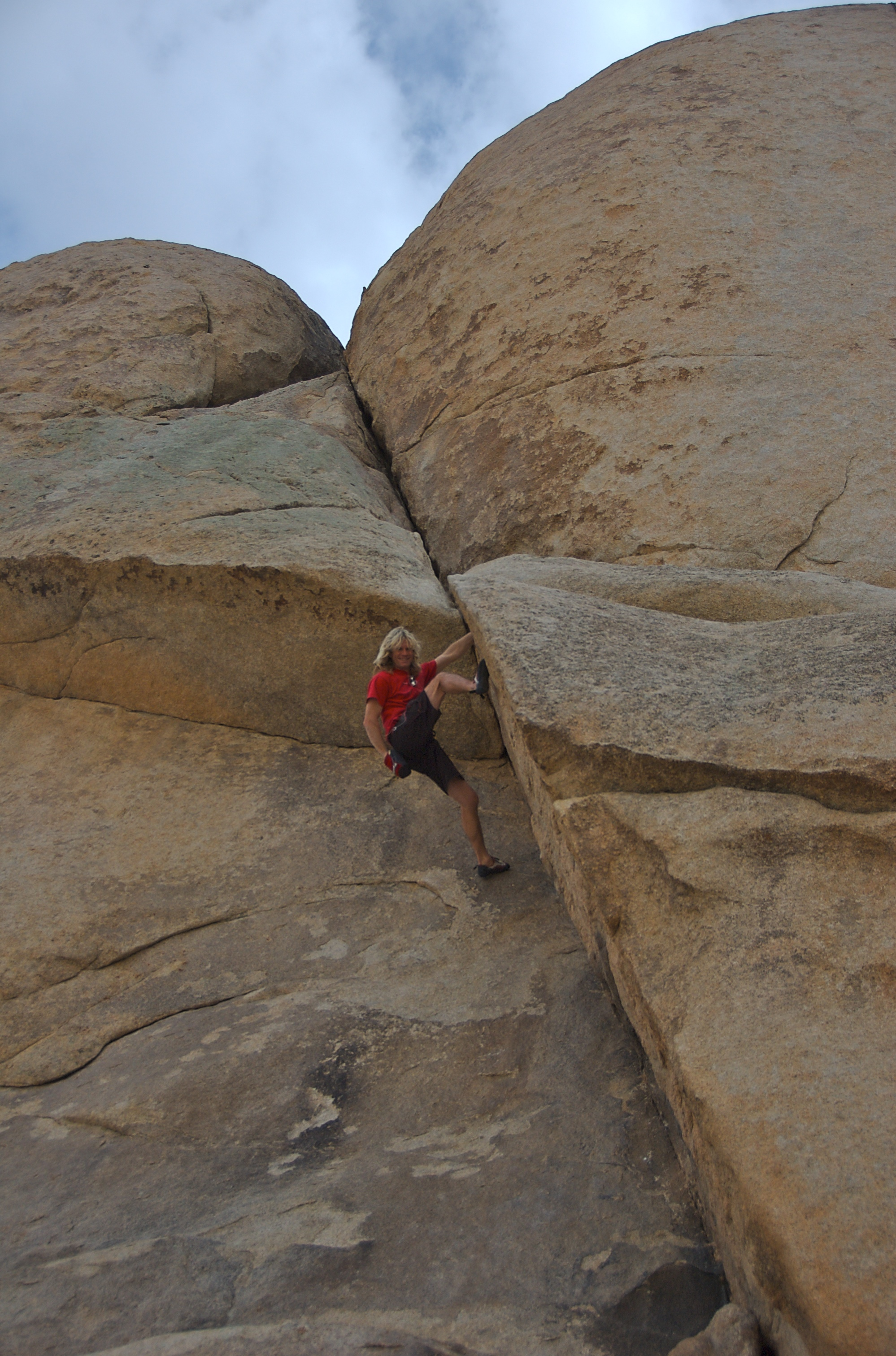
Michael Reardon free soloing Lower Right Ski Track (5.10b) in Joshua Tree National Park, 2007.

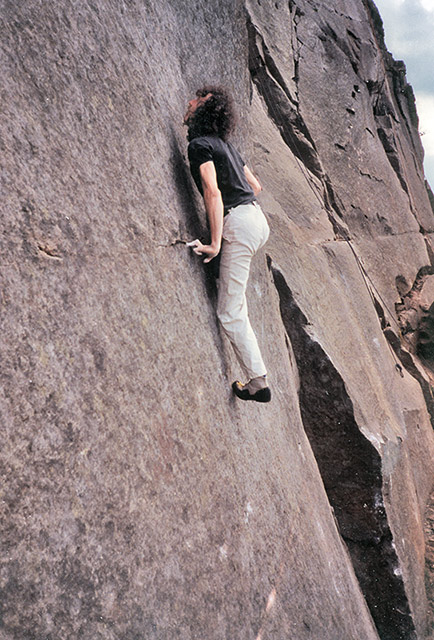
Derek Hersey, free soloing Downhill Racer (E1 6a), Froggatt Edge, 1979

A number of notable free solo practitioners have died while free soloing:

- Paul Preuss (3 October 1913; age 27) died in a 300-metre (980 ft) fall from the attempted first ascent of the North Ridge of the Mandlkogel (in the Gosaukamm) as a free solo.
- Jimmy Jewell died (31 October 1987; age 34) free soloing the easy route Poor Man's Peuterey (graded UK-Severe) at Tremadog, North Wales taking a short-cut.
- Tobin Sorenson, died (October 5, 1980; age 25) while free soloing Mount Alberta's North Face in the Canadian Rockies.
- Derek Hersey died (28 May 1993; age 36) while free soloing the Steck-Salathé Route on Sentinel Rock in Yosemite.
- Dwight Bishop died (19 July 2004; age 49) while climbing alone and unroped along the Grand Traverse route on Grand Teton peak in Wyoming.
- John Bachar died (5 July 2009; age 52) in a free solo accident at Dike Wall near Mammoth Lakes, California.
- Michael J. Ybarra died (July 2012; age 45) climbing solo on The Matterhorn Peak in California's Sierra Nevada Mountains.

Climbing magazine reported that a number of prominent free solo practitioners died in related or other extreme sports, including: Dan Osman (died at age 35 while rope jumping at Yosemite), Michael Reardon (died age 42 while rock climbing sea cliffs when he was carried out to sea by a rogue wave), Dean Potter (died age 43 while wingsuit flying when he crashed at Yosemite), Brad Gobright (died age 31 while abseiling at Potrero Chico), and Hansjorg Auer (died age 35 in an avalanche at Howse Peak).

== Related disciplines ==
Free soloing in other formats

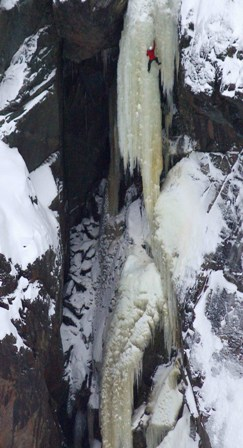
Climber free soloing the famous Lipton (WI7), in Rjukan, Norway.

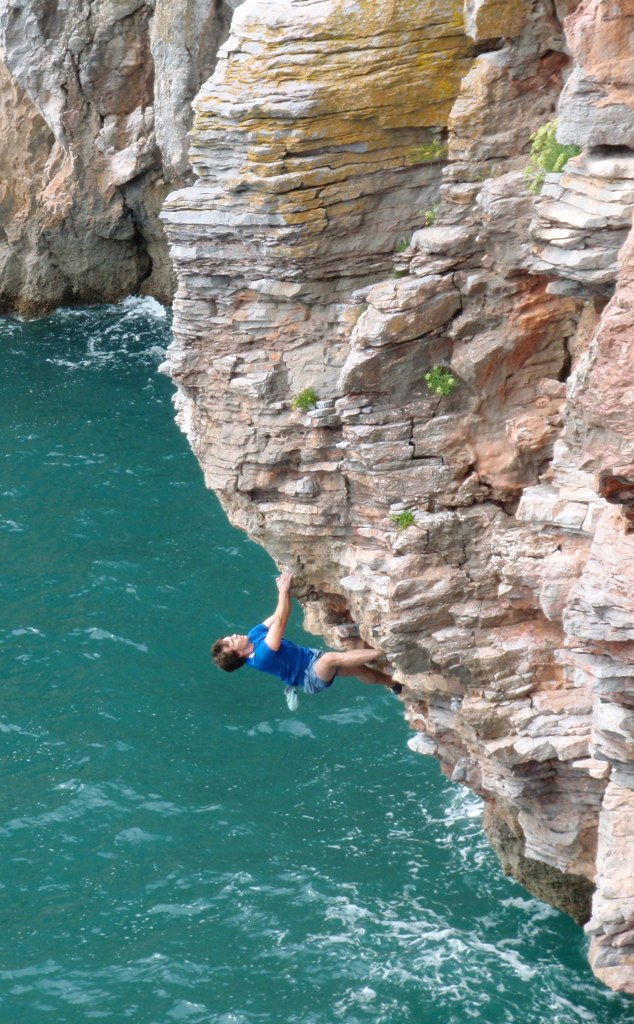
Climber deep-water soloing White Rhino Tea (f7a), in Devon, England.

- Alpine speed solo climbing: Some leading alpine climbers have set speed climbing records on classic alpine climbing routes – particularly the six great north faces of the Alps – that are done as free solos as using ropes and other protection would take too long. Notable alpine free solo speed climbers include Ueli Steck and Dani Arnold, whose rivalry was featured in the 2021 film, Race to the Summit. (Note: The film includes a public dispute between the pair when Arnold used the in-situ fixed ropes on the Hinterstoisser traverse on the Eiger during his record ascent, which Steck felt violated Arnold's ascent as being a proper free solo)
- Buildering: Some free soloists scale buildings, such as Alain Robert ("The French Spider-Man"), and Dan Goodwin ("Skyscraperman"), who have scaled dozens of skyscrapers around the world—a sport known as buildering—without any safety equipment.
- Deep-water soloing (DWS), is a subtype of solo climbing performed on rock faces overhanging water where in the case of a fall, the climber lands in the water. Deep-water routes can involve falls of 20–40 metres (66–131 ft), and thus a risk of serious injury. Noted DWS climbers include Chris Sharma.
- FreeBASEing, is a subtype of free solo climbing performed on long multi-pitch big wall routes with a BASE jumping parachute as the sole means of protection. A falling climber opens their parachute to arrest their fall. It was pioneered by Dean Potter.
- Highball bouldering, is where the boulder exceeds 7–10 metres (23–33 ft) in height, and any fall, even where bouldering mats are used, presents a risk of serious injury. Where highball bouldering ends and free soloing begins is a source of debate.
- Ice climbing: Some ice climbers are notable for ice free-soloing, as well as mixed free-soloing. As well as the specific risks of free soloing, performing it on ice adds the serious and unpredictable risk of parts of the ice route spontaneously breaking off. Notable ice free-soloists include the late Canadian Marc-André Leclerc, whose free-solo ice-climbing on the Stanley Headwall features in the 2021 film, The Alpinist, the late Austrian mountaineer Martin Feistl who fell while free soloing on the Scharnitzspitze, and Swiss mountaineer Dani Arnold.

== In film ==
A number of notable films have been made focused on free solo climbing (both on rock and on ice) including:

- Skyscraper Live, a 2026 Netflix special about Alex Honnold's free solo climb of the Taipei 101 building.
- Race to the Summit, a 2023 documentary film about the rivalry between Ueli Steck and Dani Arnold in setting solo alpine speed records.
- The Alpinist, a 2021 documentary film about the late Canadian alpinist Marc-André Leclerc, featuring various free solo ice and alpine ascents.
- Dirty Bird, The Derek Hersey Story, a 2003 documentary film about Derek Hersey, directed by Peter Mortimer.
- Free Solo, a 2018 documentary film about Alex Honnold's free solo climb of Freerider 5.13a (7c+) on El Capitan.
- King Lines, a 2007 documentary film about Chris Sharma, featuring his free solo climb of the DWS route, Es Pontàs 9a+ (5.15a), in Mallorca.
- Hard Grit, a 1998 documentary film about rock climbing on gritstone routes in the British Peak District, which features free soloing.
- Opera Vertical (1984), a documentary about free climbing in the Verdon Gorge, with Patrick Edlinger free-soloing Debiloff barefoot.
- La Vie au Bout des Doigts (Life by the Fingertips), 1982 documentary, about Patrick Edlinger free soloing in La Piade (Toulon) and Buoux.

== See also ==
- Free climbing
- Rope soloing
- Solo climbing
