= Dani Arnold =

Swiss extreme mountaineer and alpinist (born 1984)

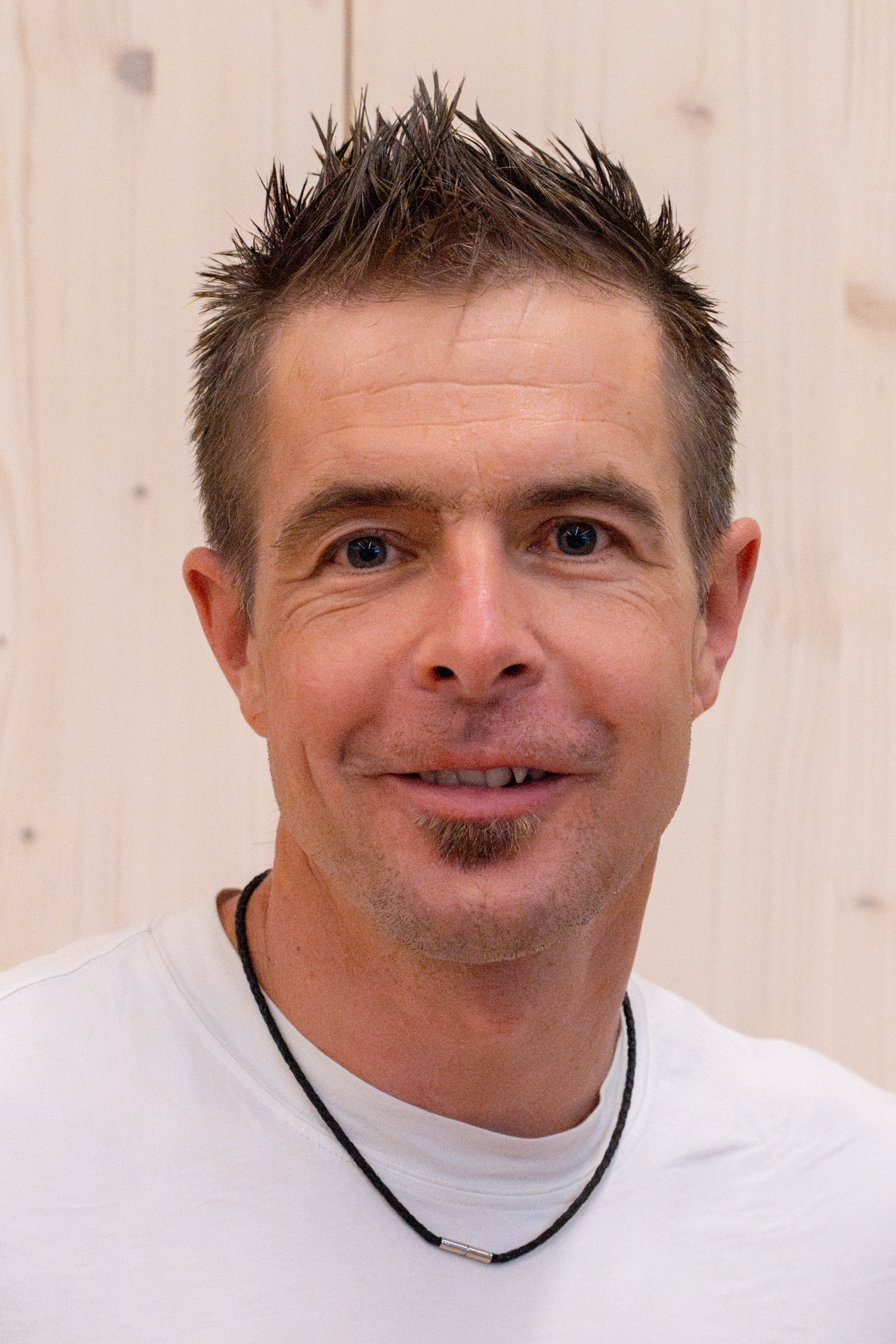

Personal information
- Born: 22 February 1984 (age 42) Canton of Uri, Switzerland
- Website: www.daniarnold.ch

Climbing career
- Type of climber: Alpine climbing; Ice climbing; Mixed climbing; Big wall climbing; Speed climbing
- Updated on 16 November 2026

Dani Arnold (born 22 February 1984) is a Swiss mountaineer and free solo climbing alpinist who specialises in extreme alpine, ice and mixed climbing routes, and who has also held a number of speed climbing records—usually done in a free solo climbing format—on several notable alpine climbing routes, including the Great north faces of the Alps such as on the Eiger, on the Grandes Jorasses, and on the Matterhorn.

== Life and career ==
Arnold grew up in the Canton of Uri and developed a passion for mountaineering at an early age. He first completed training as a mechanical engineer and then as a mountain guide. He quickly specialized in solo climbing and in free solo climbing and extremely fast ascents of major alpine climbing and big wall climbing routes. In addition to his solo projects, he also works as a professional alpinist for various sponsors and gives lectures about his expeditions. Arnold is a mountain guide, married, father of a daughter, and lives in Bürglen.

== Records ==
Arnold has held — and some are still current — several speed climbing records on the six Great north faces of the Alps:

- North face of the Eiger – Between 2011 and 2015, Arnold held the record for the fastest solo ascent of the north face via the 1938 Heckmair Route in 2 hours 28 minutes, breaking Ueli Steck's previous record. In 2015, Steck set a new record at 2 hours 22 minutes.
- North face of the Matterhorn (2015) – Fastest ascent via the Schmid Route in 1 hour 46 minutes.
- North face of the Grandes Jorasses (2018) – New speed record via the Walker Spur route in 2 hours 4 minutes.
- North face of the Cima Grande di Lavaredo (2019) – New record for the Comici-Dimai route with 46 minutes 30 seconds.
- North face of the Piz Badile (2020) – Free solo ascent via the classic Cassin route in 52 minutes.
- North face of the Petit Dru (2021) – Fastest ascent via the classic route in 1 hour 43 minutes.

== Other notable climbs ==
- The Hurting (XI, 11) (2012) – Mixed climbing route on Ben Nevis with high "ground fall" potential.
- Crack Baby (2014) – Set a speed record on the notable ice climbing route, 'Crack Baby (360m WI6) of 27 min 13 sec.
- Anubis (XII, 12) in Scotland (2016) – First repeat of the mixed climbing route on Ben Nevis, then the hardest mixed route in the UK.
- Beta Block Super (WI7) (2017) - First free solo of the ice climbing route, Beta Block Super, on Breitwangfluh in 1h 03min.
- Ritter der Kokosnuss (M12) (2017).
- Schweizernase (2017) – First ascent of a new route on the Matterhorn north face.
- Uristier (WI6+/M8) – First ascent on a new route on the Schöllenen (2019)
- Salbitschijen (2023) – New free solo climbing speed record with 9 hours, 36 minutes, and 55 seconds for West, South, and East ridges.

== Expeditions and first ascents ==
Arnold has undertaken numerous expeditions and first ascents. Notable achievements include:

- Patagonia (2010) – First winter ascent of Torre Egger.
- Patagonia (2013) – Cerro Torre in winter – Successful winter ascent.
- Alaska (2016) – First ascent of "Bird of Prey" in the Mooses Tooth Towers.
- Canada (2019) – Power Shrimps Helmcken Falls – First ascent of the extreme ice route at the 140m high Helmcken Falls.
- Pakistan (2019) – Broad Peak 8051m – Expedition to the 8051m high Broad Peak.
- Russia (2020) – Expedition to Lake Baikal in winter – 10 first ascents between WI5 and M8 over the frozen Lake Baikal.
- Iceland (2022) – Ice expedition – Ice and mixed climbing in Iceland.

== Awards ==
- Paul-Preuss-Award 2024

== Documentaries ==
- Matthias Affolter: Berge im Kopf. (in German) Film, 2014, 93 min.
- Netflix: Race to the Summit Film, 2023, 90 min.
- NDR: Climber Dani Arnold – Free Solo Records on the North Faces. Documentary (in German), 2024, 30 min.

== Publications ==
- Why All This? Records & Reflections by Extreme Alpinist Dani Arnold. 2018.
- 9:39 North – Solo through the Great North Faces of the Alps. (in German) Uli Auffermann & Dani Arnold 2022.
- HOW not WHAT – Reflections by Dani Arnold 2023.
- Anti Gravity – Thomas Monsorno & Dani Arnold 2024.
