= Michael Reardon (climber) =

American rock climber (1965–2007)

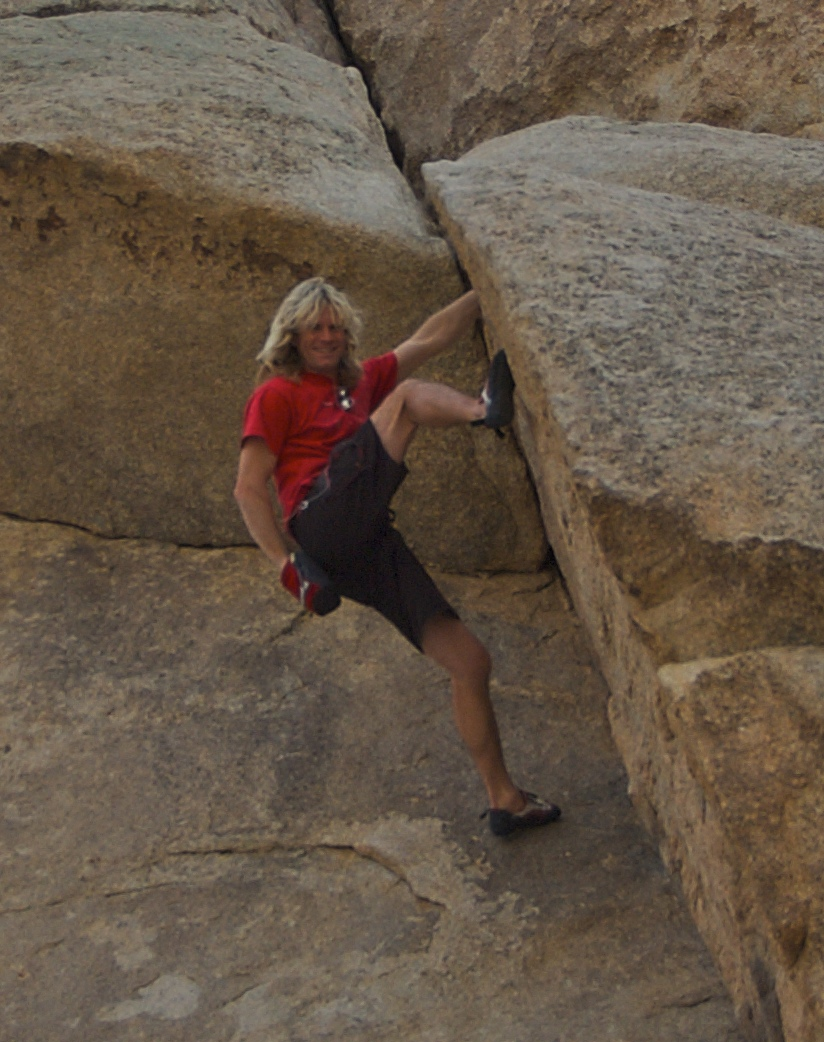
- Michael Reardon free soloing Lower Right Ski Track (5.10b) on Intersection Rock in Joshua Tree National Park.

Personal information
- Nationality: American
- Born: May 1, 1965 Quonset Point, Rhode Island, US
- Died: July 13, 2007 (aged 42) Valentia Island, County Kerry, Ireland

Climbing career
- Type of climber: Free Solo
- First ascents: More than 150 First Ascents Solos, including Waiting for Guntess (5.13a) at Malibu Creek State Park, CA; Shikata Ga Nai (V 5.12) at Needles, CA in 2006; MRSR (5.12a) at Joshua Tree National Park, CA Rainy Days (5.12d) at Ailladie, Ireland
- Major ascents: Notable Solo Ascents Equinox (5.12c/d) at Joshua Tree National Park, CA; EBGBs (5.10d) at Joshua Tree National Park, CA; Ghetto Blaster (5.13b) at Malibu Creek State Park, CA; Urban Struggle (5.12b) at Malibu Creek State Park; Lateralus (5.14a) at Malibu Creek State Park; Pirate (5.12c/d) at Suicide Rocks, CA; Outrage (5.13a) at Boney Bluffs in the Santa Monica Mountains, CA (On-Sight); Romantic Warrior (V 5.12b) at Needles, CA (On-Sight), 2005; Sea of Tranquility (V 5.11d, A0) at Needles, CA (On-Sight); 214 routes in England including Neon Dust (5.13b/c) at Froggatt (On-Sight); Palisade Traverse (VI 5.9) in 22 hours (the previous ascent took 12 days By Scott McCook and Adam Penney) in the Sierra Mountain Range, CA (On-Sight) Favorite Climb The Vampire (III 5.11) at Tahquitz, CA

Michael Reardon (May 1, 1965 – July 13, 2007) was an American professional free solo climber, filmmaker, motivational speaker and writer. Reardon died at age 42, after being swept to sea by a rogue wave, shortly after climbing a sea cliff at Dohilla in County Kerry, Ireland.

== General information ==
Michael Reardon was one of only a few professional free-solo climbers. He traveled the world looking for the next ultimate solo climb, giving motivational speeches and presenting slideshows.

Reardon was known for leaving mementos for those who followed him. Examples include plastic tigers attached to bolts, the Ninja Turtles, blow up dolls, and oversized panties in summit registers.

He lived with his wife Marci and daughter Nikki in Oak Park, California.

== Climbing history ==
Reardon started climbing as a child on the boulders in his grandfather's backyard. Together with his cousins, both his climbing skills and his interest in climbing were challenged and developed. Bouldering in a backyard turned to three-day hikes in the Appalachian Mountains, and then to hiking in the Rocky Mountains. Reardon eventually found himself in California where his climbing skills were fostered even further.

Reardon's first formal climb was at Tahquitz, California, on a 1,000-foot route called Whodunit (5.9), with a "crusty old climber." As the story goes, halfway up the route, the crusty handed Michael some gear and told him, "You'll use these when you're scared."

After the successful ascent, the pair had enough time to climb a 500-foot 5.7. Reardon had now officially caught the climbing bug. Because he didn't have any friends to climb with, or any gear of his own, Reardon chose to start climbing without ropes. He returned to the 5.7 climb, and soon found himself at the top, without having to rely on any ropes.

== Scholastic history ==
Reardon attended the University of California at Los Angeles, graduating with B.S. degrees in Philosophy and Political Science, then later graduated from the Pepperdine University School of Law with a Juris Doctor Degree.

== Professional history ==
Reardon acted as the Head of Business Affairs for Harvey Entertainment, then as a Partner/the Head of Production of Black Sky Entertainment. At the time of his death, he owned Jumprunner Productions, a video production company that produced several documentaries about notable rock climbers.

== Death ==
At 5pm Irish Standard Time on July 13, 2007, Reardon was reported missing after he was hit by a rogue wave and swept out to sea, shortly after climbing down the 600-foot (180m) Fogher Cliff (51.9236°N 10.3556°W) just west of Valentia Coast Guard Station in County Kerry, Ireland. A coastal search was immediately undertaken by the nearby Coast Guard lifeboat, a rescue helicopter, cliff rescue teams and local people, who searched unsuccessfully. His body was never recovered.

== Notable achievements ==
- Equinox (5.12c/d) and EBGBs (5.10d), Joshua Tree National Park, CA
- 1,000 individual solos in 30 days and 100 first ascent solos up to 5.12 at Joshua Tree National Park, CA
- Ghetto Blaster (5.13b) and "Urban Struggle" (5.12b) at Malibu Creek, CA
- The Pirate (5.12d) at Suicide Rock, Idyllwild, CA
- Onsight solo of Outrage (5.13a) at Boney Bluffs, Santa Monica Mountains, CA
- Onsight solo of Romantic Warrior (V 5.12b) which National Geographic gave Michael "Adventurer of the Year for in 2005, Sea of Tranquility (V 5.11d, A0) and the first ascent solo of Shikata Ga Nai (V 5.12) at the Needles, CA
- Onsight solo of 214 routes in England including Neon Dust (5.13b/c)
- Onsight solo of 240 routes in Ireland, including the first ascent of Rainy Days (5.12+) at Ailladie, County Clare
- The first solo of the Palisade Traverse (VI 5.9) in 22 hours (the previous ascent took 12 days) in the Sierra Mountain Range, USA

== Related companies ==
- Damon Corso – Photographer
- Jumprunner Productions – Production Company
- Petrala – Production Company
- Westlake Marketing Works – Marketing Company

== Sponsors ==
- Metolius Climbing
- Acopa
- NEMO Equipment
- Leki Poles
- Jetboil
