= Sentinel Rock =

Peak in Yosemite National Park, USA

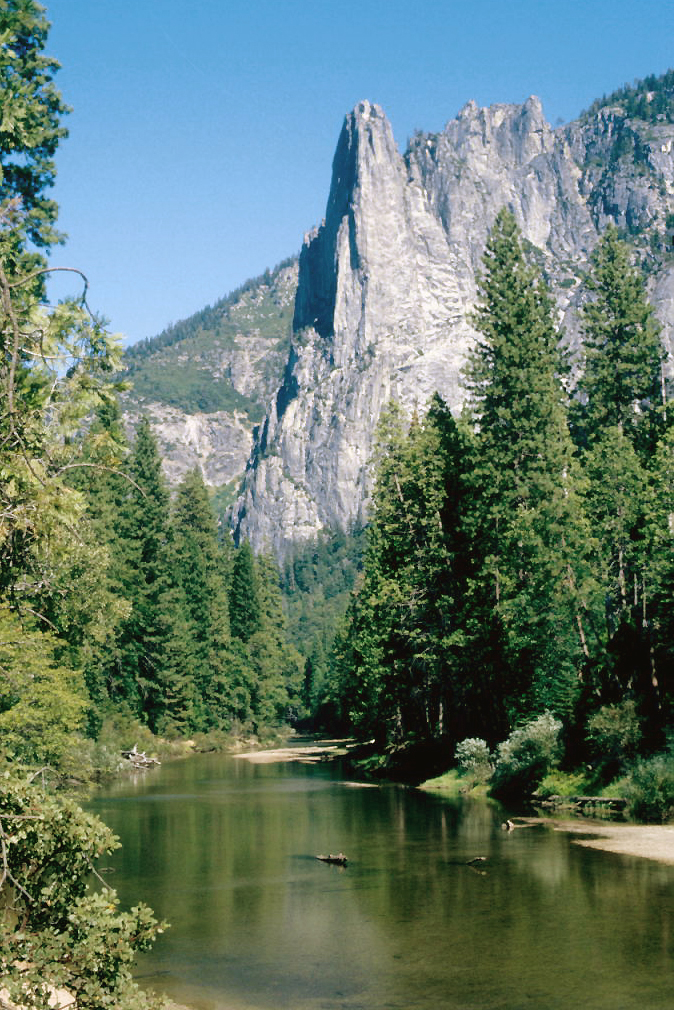
- A photo of Sentinel Rock in Yosemite Valley

Highest point
- Elevation: 7,038 ft (2,145 m)
- Coordinates: 37°43′44″N 119°35′40″W

Geography
- Location within California Location within the United States
- Location: Yosemite National Park; Mariposa County, California, U.S.
- Parent range: Sierra Nevada
- Topo map: USGS Half Dome

Geology
- Rock age: Cretaceous
- Rock type: Granite

Climbing
- First ascent: June 30 - July 4, 1950 by Allen Steck and John Salathé
- Easiest route: Circular Staircase (class 5.8)

Sentinel Rock is a granitic peak in Yosemite National Park, California, United States. It towers over Yosemite Valley, opposite Yosemite Falls. Sentinel Rock lies 0.7 miles (1.1 km) northwest of Sentinel Dome.

== Geology ==
Sentinel Rock formed when masses of rock split off Yosemite Valley's south-side cliff, along steep joints trending nearly east–west. This formed the near-vertical north face of Sentinel Rock.

== Climbing ==
The most famous climbing route is the Steck-Salathé route, which is rated a class 5.10b G A0.

Climber Derek Hersey died while attempting to free solo climb Sentinel Rock in 1993.

== Gallery ==
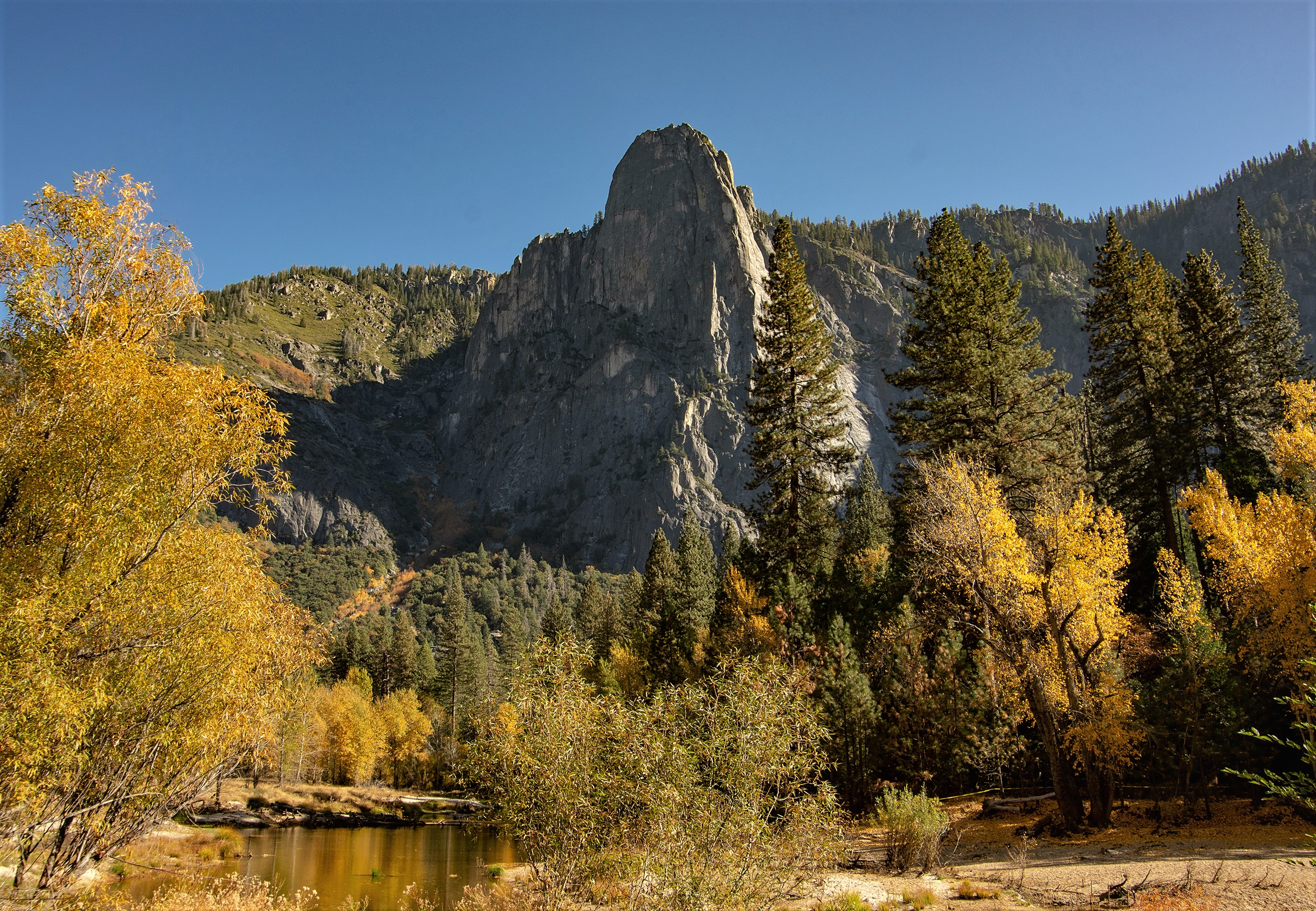
Northwest aspect

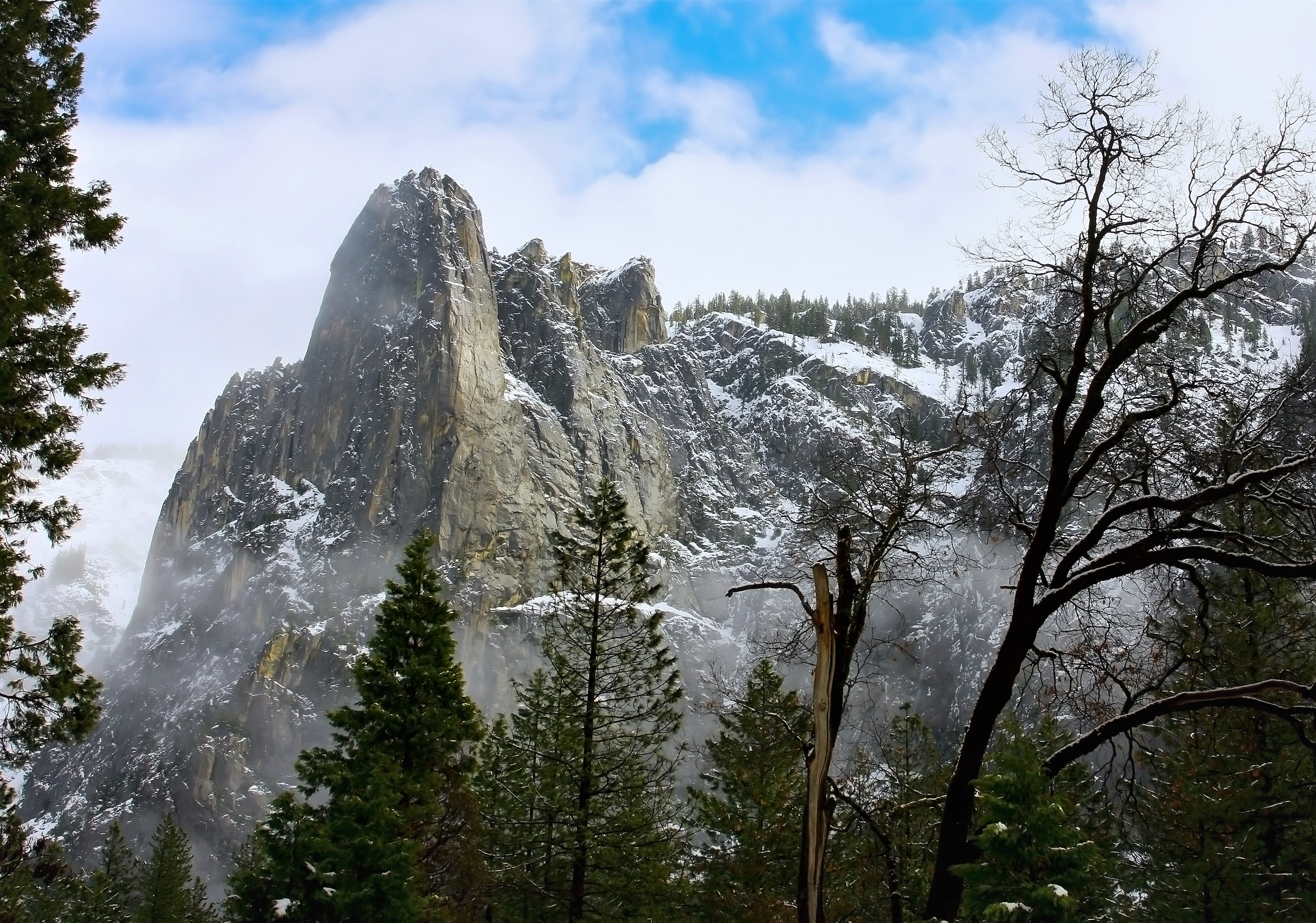

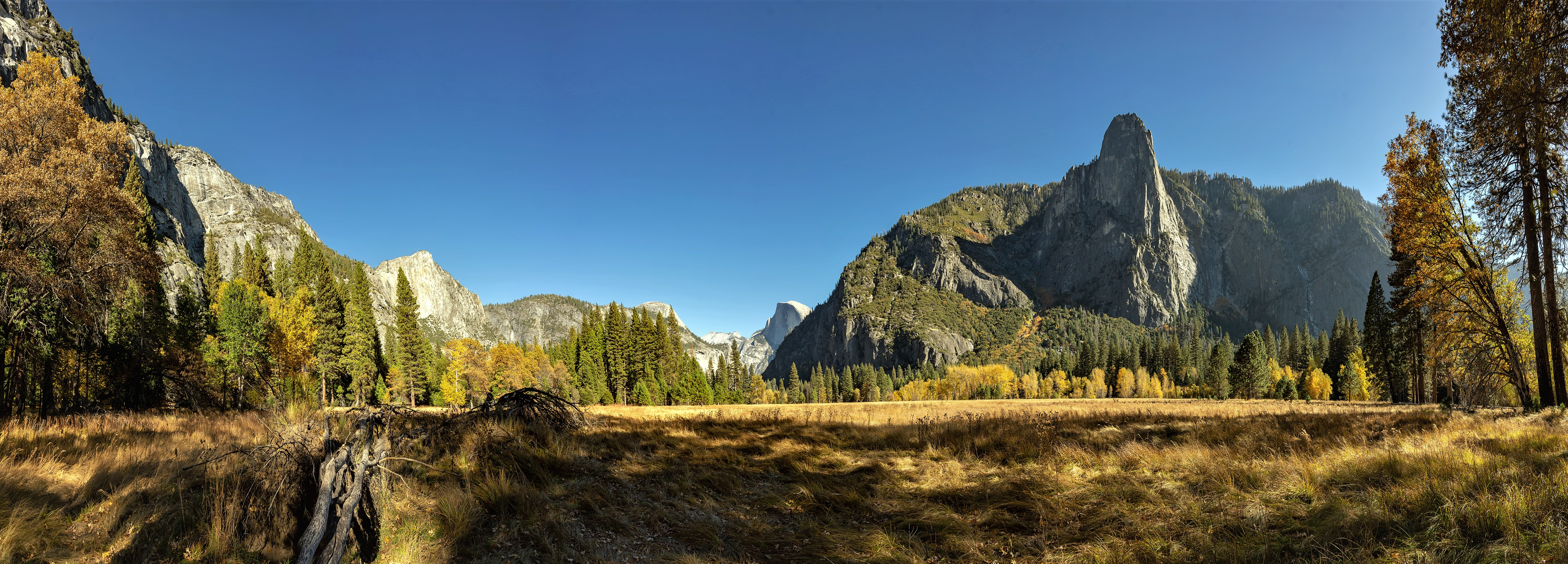
Sentinel Rock (right) in Yosemite Valley. (camera pointed east)

== See also ==
- Sentinel granodiorite
