= Dwight Bishop =

American rock climber

- Born: July 30, 1955; Fort Benning, Georgia, U.S.
- Died: July 16, 2004, 49 years old Grand Tetons, Wyoming, U.S.
- Cause of death: Free-solo climbing accident
- Resting place: Grand Tetons National Park
- Known for: Free soloist
- Notable work: Butte's Climbing Guide

Dwight Bishop (July 30, 1955 – July 16, 2004) was an American rock climber. Known for his technical skill as a climber and guide, he died from a fall while free solo climbing in the Teton Range.

== Biography ==
Bishop was born at Fort Benning, Georgia on July 30, 1955, to John Bishop, a soldier, and Geraldine (née Han) Bishop. He studied physical therapy at Montana State University and the University of Montana. He worked at his family's equipment rental business in Butte, Montana.

== Climbing ==
Bishop achieved recognition in the climbing community for his ascents of many exceptionally demanding routes, such as the Eiger peak in the Bernese Alps. However, much of his climbing efforts were concentrated in the Teton Range in the northwestern United States. He made several ascents of the many peaks in this range, many of them by free solo climbing and some during winter.

Bishop was a prominent climbing guide in the Tetons and published a handbook for climbers in the area, Butte's Climbing Guide.

== Death ==
During an attempt to free solo the Grand Traverse climbing route of the Grand Teton peak and several other peaks within a single day, Bishop fell to his death on July 16, 2004; his body was found after a two-day search. Many of his fellow climbers expressed surprise at his unlikely death on a mountain with which he had extensive experience and was well within his skill range. His ashes were scattered in the Grand Tetons.

== Other ventures ==
Bishop was an avid long-distance cyclist and competed in the Race Across America cycling contest in 1993 and 2000. In his first attempt in 1993, Dwight made a near fatal mistake in preparation for Race Across America. When he purchased his fuel for the race, he tried a new brand and didn't realize there was no salt in the fuel. He made it almost 800 miles before being overcome by his lack of salt and had to quit. Afterwards he spent some time in a hospital recovering. He also had studied kendo in Japan for two years and was a third-degree black belt in the art of taekwondo. Dwight also worked as a Japanese to English translator for some time and rode professional motocross in the 70's.

== See also ==
- Grand Teton National Park
