= Derek Hersey =

British rock climber

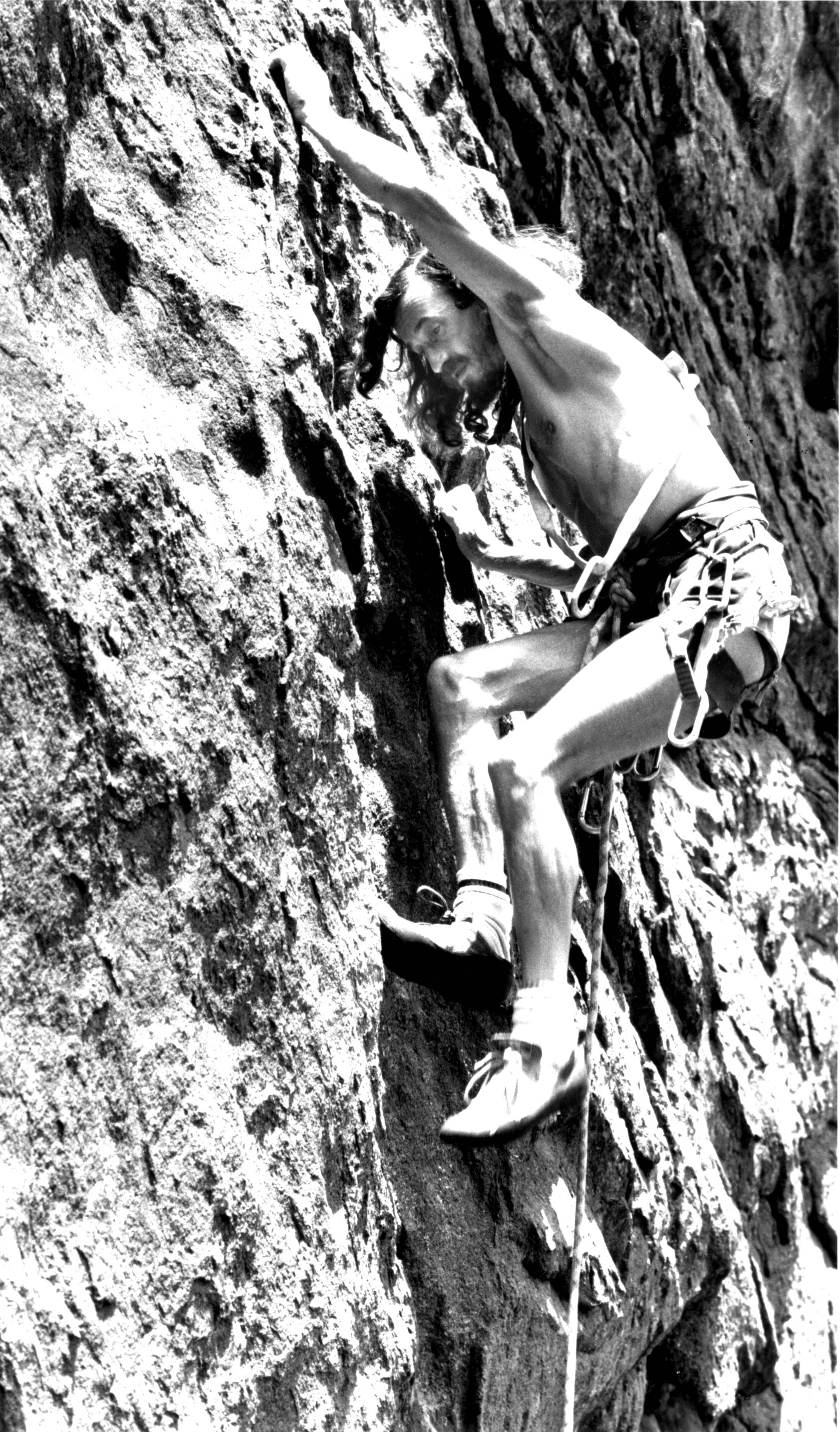
- Derek Hersey, on the climb "the Bulge" in Eldorado Canyon, Colorado, circa 1990

Personal information
- Nationality: British
- Born: 26 October 1956
- Died: 28 May 1993 (aged 36) Steck-Salathé Route on Sentinel Rock in Yosemite National Park
- Occupation: Rock climber

Climbing career
- Known for: Free soloing

Derek Geoffrey Hersey (26 October 1956 – 28 May 1993) was a British rock climber who specialized in free soloing, and was for many years an active participant in the Boulder, Colorado climbing scene in the United States.

== Climbing career ==
Originally from Stretford, Greater Manchester, England, Hersey was based in Colorado, United States, and referred to Eldorado Canyon as his 'office', where he could be seen on any day of the week, if not on a road trip to Yosemite National Park or elsewhere. He also referred to Boulder, Colorado's Liquor Mart as 'The Shrine', and described his climbing-chalk bag as 'my bag of courage'. Hersey was featured in Climbing Magazine and posthumously in the film Front Range Freaks. He was 5 feet 11 inches (1.80 m) tall and weighed 138 pounds (63 kg). He spoke with a strong Manchester accent.

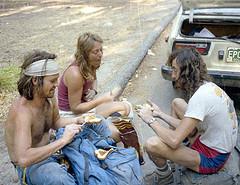
Derek Hersey (right) and friends making PBJ sandwiches, Yosemite Valley, California

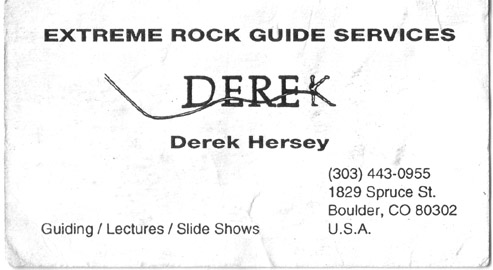
Hersey's business card

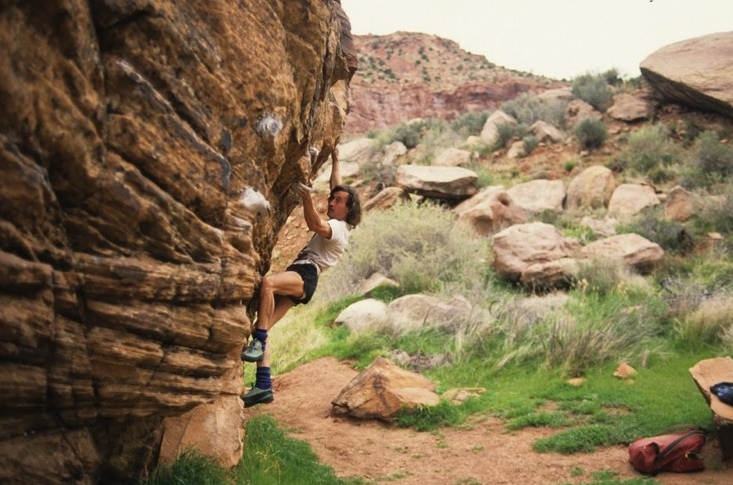
Hersey bouldering in Zion

Hersey was introduced to climbing by his father, who went hiking near Manchester every week. Hersey learned to climb on the gritstone of the Peak District National Park in Derbyshire. In 1983, after being unemployed for five years in England, Hersey decided to travel to the United States, where he lived for the rest of his life.

Hersey specialized in unroped free solo climbing, often in the 5.10–5.11 range; he died during such a free solo climb. Few climbers have tried to repeat his achievements, which include many of Colorado's hardest traditional routes.

Hersey's efforts to push the limits of free soloing earned him the nickname "Dr. Death". Hersey was perhaps best known for his exploits in Eldorado Canyon, but his résumé included many other challenging ascents (and descents). Among them was his free-solo ascent of Crack of Fear, a sustained 5.10+ off-width route at Lumpy Ridge, Colorado; and an impressive effort on the Diamond (a 275-metre (902 ft) wall on Longs Peak), when he free-soloed ascents of two routes and downclimbed another in a single day. He was well known for pumping up and down laps on the sustained 5.10 route Rosy Crucifixion in Eldorado Canyon as a workout regime.

== Death ==
Derek Hersey died on 28 May 1993 in an accident while soloing the Steck-Salathé Route without protective gear, on Sentinel Rock in Yosemite National Park. He fell several hundred feet to his death. Craig Luebben, a friend of Hersey, speculated that he encountered a slippery rock. Although there was no rainfall officially reported in the area that day, a later report stated that "rain-slicked rock" contributed to his fall. The search for Hersey's body was featured in a report on the CBS News programme 48 Hours.
