= Steck-Salathé Route =

Big wall climbing route up Sentinel Rock, Yosemite

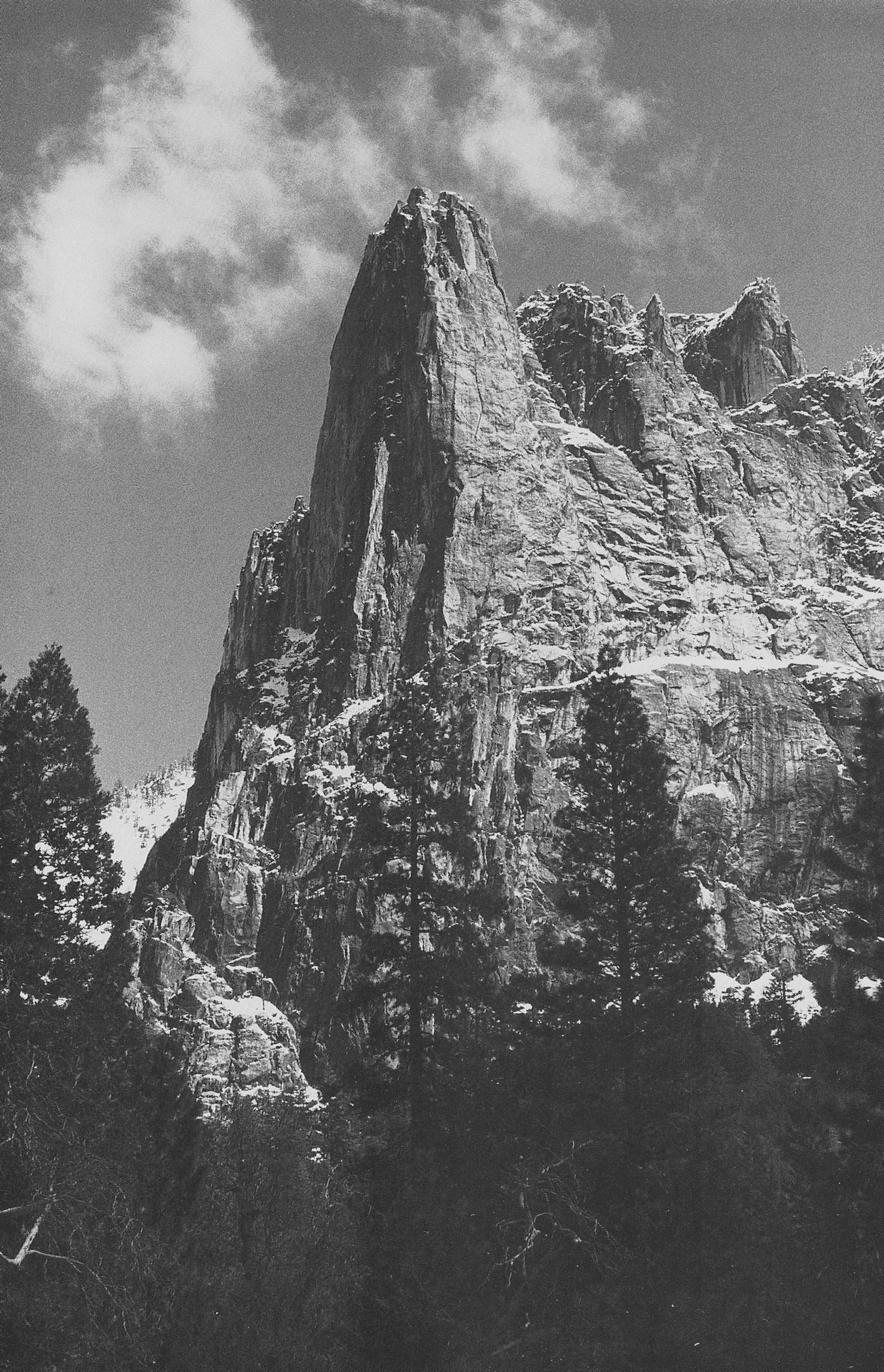
- Location: California, USA
- Coordinates: 37°43′44″N 119°35′40″W
- Climbing area: Yosemite Valley
- Route type: Big wall climbing, Traditional climbing
- Vertical gain: 1,500 feet
- Pitches: 16
- Technical grade: 5.10a/b
- NCCS grade: V
- First ascent: Allen Steck and John Salathé, 1950.
- First free ascent: Steve Wunsch, Jim Erickson, 1970

The Steck-Salathé Route is a big wall traditional climbing route up Sentinel Rock.

== History ==
The route was first climbed, in extremely hot weather with minimal water, from June 30 - July 4, 1950, by Allen Steck and John Salathé, up the 1,600-foot (490 m) north face of Sentinel Rock in Yosemite Valley. They climbed mostly free using occasional direct aid pitons on some pitches, and a blank wall halfway up required a 30-foot bolt ladder. It was the longest and most difficult route in Yosemite in 1950.

The route was repeated several times in the 50s using less and less aid. In 1959, Royal Robbins and Tom Frost did it all free except for the short bolt ladder, producing the most strenuous long free climb in America, with 6 pitches of 5.10a or 5.9, and many tiring 5.8 leads.

In 1970, Steve Wunsch and Jim Erickson discovered a long finger/hand-size crack to the left of the bolt ladder, adding yet another 5.9+ pitch, which allowed the wall to be climbed totally free.

In 1973, Henry Barber made the first free solo ascent, on sight, in record time, 2 hours 45 minutes.

The route is recognized in the historic climbing text Fifty Classic Climbs of North America. It is famous for its large cracks: out of 18 pitches, 15 feature either offwidth cracks or squeeze chimneys, including what is arguably the most famous squeeze chimney in the world, the Narrows.

Derek Hersey died while free soloing the route in 1993. His fall from several hundred feet was suspected to be due to a slippery rock, coated with moisture.
