= Allen Steck =

American mountaineer and rock climber (1926–2023)

Personal information
- Born: May 17, 1926 Oakland, California, U.S.
- Died: February 23, 2023 (aged 96)

Climbing career
- Type of climber: Mountaineer, rock climber
- First ascents: Southeast Face (Clyde Minaret)
- Named routes: Steck-Salathé Route (Sentinel Rock)

Allen Parker Steck (May 17, 1926 – February 23, 2023) was an American mountaineer and rock climber.

== Mountaineering ==
Allen Steck was born in Oakland, California on May 17, 1926. He started climbing with his brother George. In 1940 when Allen was 14, the two completed the first ascent of the northwest ridge of Mount Maclure (12,886 feet (3,928 m)). He served in the U.S. Navy during World War II. Discharged in 1946, he joined the Rock Climbing Section of the Sierra Club, and began climbing on Berkeley crags such as Indian Rock and Cragmont. He enrolled at the University of California, Berkeley, majoring in German. His early climbing influences included Dick Leonard and David Brower.

Steck began climbing in Yosemite Valley in 1947, initially learning the use of pitons by trial and error. He said that at that time, there "was no body of people who could help you learn these things." He has been a Life Member of the Sierra Club since 1947.

In 1949, he climbed in the Alps, completing the first ascent by an American of the Comici route on the north face of the Cima Grande in the Dolomites together with his Austrian friend Karl Lugmayer.

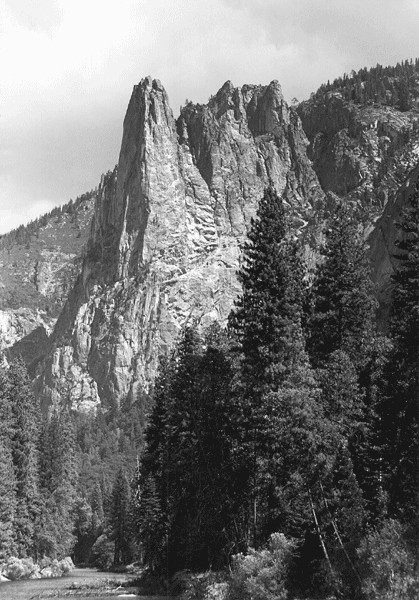
Sentinel Rock in Yosemite Valley

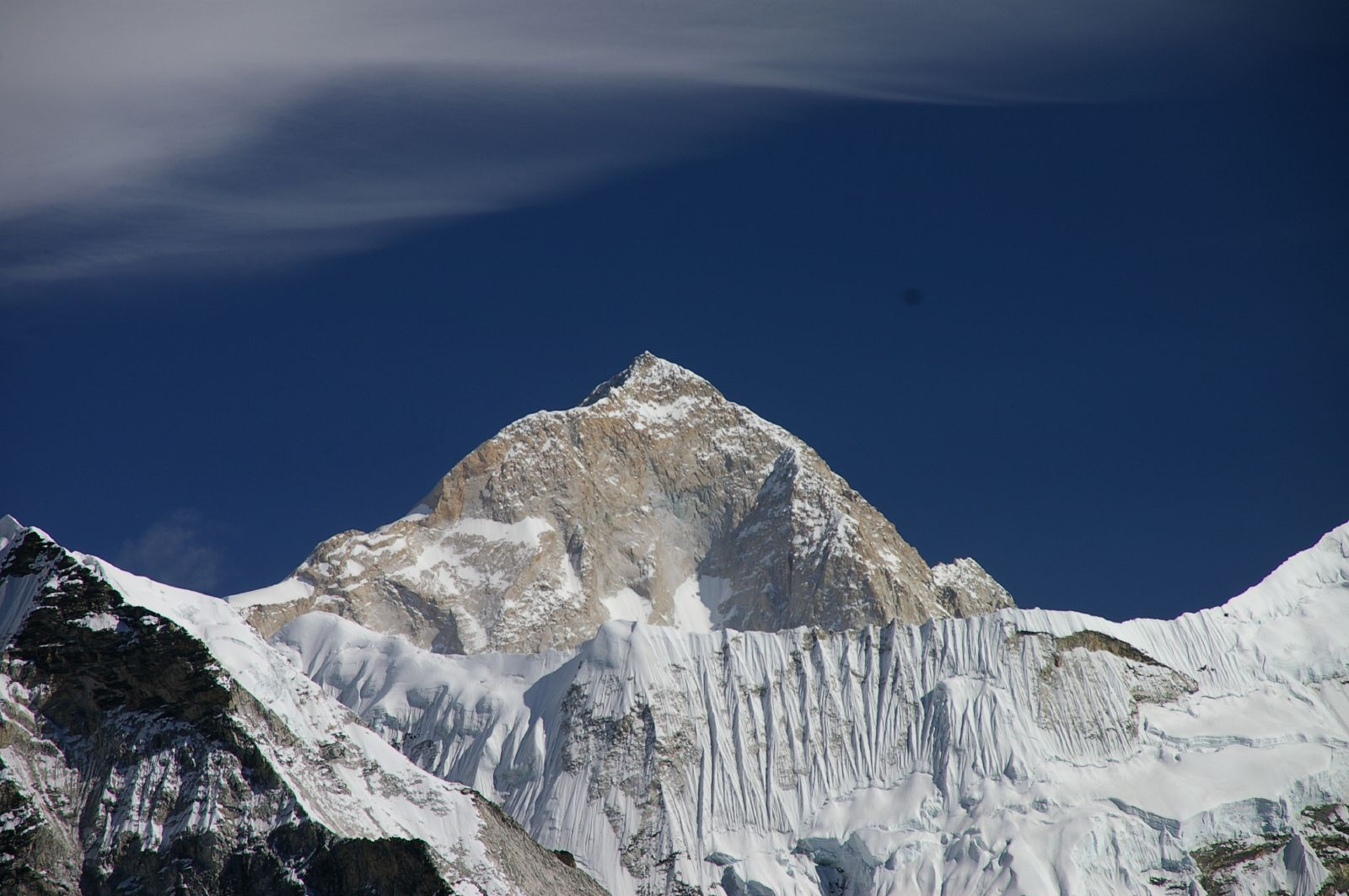
Makalu

From June 30 to July 4, 1950, with John Salathé, he completed the first ascent of Steck-Salathé Route up the 1,600-foot (490 m) north face of Sentinel Rock in Yosemite Valley. Steck described the climb in an article originally published in the Sierra Club Bulletin in 1951: "The ascent of this wall was probably the toughest that either of us had ever made, or ever hoped to make again. Though John has 51 years to my 24, the climb seemed to have little effect on his endurance; only toward the end of the third day, did he seem to show signs of wear, but then both of us were ready to acknowledge the pleasures of simple back country hiking. It was just too damned hot".

In 1952, he went to work at a Berkeley ski, mountaineering and backpacking store called The Ski Hut, and later worked for their equipment manufacturing division Trailwise. He specialized in sleeping bag design.

Steck participated in the first attempt on Makalu in Nepal which was made by an American team led by William Siri in the spring of 1954. The expedition was composed of members of the Sierra Club and was called the California Himalayan Expedition to Makalu. This was the first major American mountaineering expedition to the Himalaya. They attempted the southeast ridge but were turned back at 7,100 m (23,300 ft) by a constant barrage of storms, as well as food shortages and lack of bottled oxygen.

On June 22, 1963, he completed the first ascent of the 1,000-foot (300 m) Southeast Face of Clyde Minaret (12,281 feet (3,743 m)) with Dick Long, John Evans and Chuck Wilts.

On August 6, 1965, he completed the first ascent of Hummingbird Ridge on Mount Logan (19,850 feet (6,050 m)) in the St. Elias Range located on the border between the Yukon and Alaska, a climb that took 35 days. The climb has never been repeated, despite numerous attempts, and is considered among the most challenging climbs in mountaineering history for that reason. Mount Logan is the second-highest peak in North America. He was accompanied to the summit by Dick Long, John Evans, Jim Wilson, Frank Coale and Paul Bacon.

In 1969, he co-founded Mountain Travel with Leo LeBon. The company is now known as Mountain Travel Sobek.

In July, 1970, Steck and Doug Robinson completed the first ascent of the "Doors of Perception" route on North Palisade rated III 5.8, described as "the most striking feature on the northeast face of the mountain" and "one of the most aesthetic lines in the Sierra."

Along with Steve Roper, he was the long-time editor of the mountaineering journal Ascent, which was originally published by the Sierra Club and later by the American Alpine Club. Steck and Roper also wrote the book Fifty Classic Climbs of North America, first published in 1979.

== Later life and death ==
Allen celebrated his 70th birthday by reascending the Steck-Salathé Route. His nickname is "the Silver Fox."

At 86, Steck was still gym climbing twice a week, public speaking, and occasionally visiting the high peaks.

His memoir, A Mountaineer's Life, was published by Patagonia in 2017.

Steck died on February 23, 2023, at the age of 96.

== Legacy ==
Jointly with Norman Clyde, he was the first recipient of the Sierra Club's Francis P. Farquhar Mountaineering Award in 1970.

In 1995, he won the American Alpine Club's Literary Award for co-authoring Fifty Classic Climbs of North America with Steve Roper.
