= Liquid chalk =

Liquified gymnastic chalk

The term liquid chalk or sharkchalk, refers to several different kinds of liquified chalk including liquid-chalk marking pens (with water-soluble ink), liquid-chalk mixtures (for athletic use: rock climbing, weightlifting, gymnastics), and liquid-chalk hobby-craft paints made of cornstarch and food coloring (some with small amounts of flour). Some forms of "liquid chalk" contain no actual chalk.

== Use in sports ==
Liquid chalk can be a variation of normal chalk (see: magnesium carbonate) used to improve grip for sports, such as rock climbing, weight lifting, or gymnastics.

=== Rock climbing ===
Rock climbers use liquid chalk to prevent their hands from sweating. It may be used by climbers in situations where powdered chalk is restricted. It is preferred by some athletes because it remains effective longer and leaves less residue on rocks and equipment. Liquid chalk for rock climbers is made from magnesium carbonate.

=== Other sports ===
In other sports, liquid chalk is less beneficial to the athlete, because re-chalking can be done more easily between sets or rounds. However, some gyms require liquid chalk because it leaves less residue on gym equipment. Liquid chalk adheres to the hand better, reducing the need to re-chalk.

== Ingredients ==
Some liquid-chalk mixtures for climbing are made with magnesium carbonate, colophony, and ethanol or an alcohol that dissolves the colophony and quickly evaporates from the solution (as isopropyl alcohol or ethanol). Sometimes, an additive for aroma is included because of the bad smell of spirit.

== See also ==
- Glossary of climbing terms
- Climbing
- Bouldering
- Magnesium carbonate
