= Ueli Steck =

Swiss mountaineer and rock climber (1976–2017)

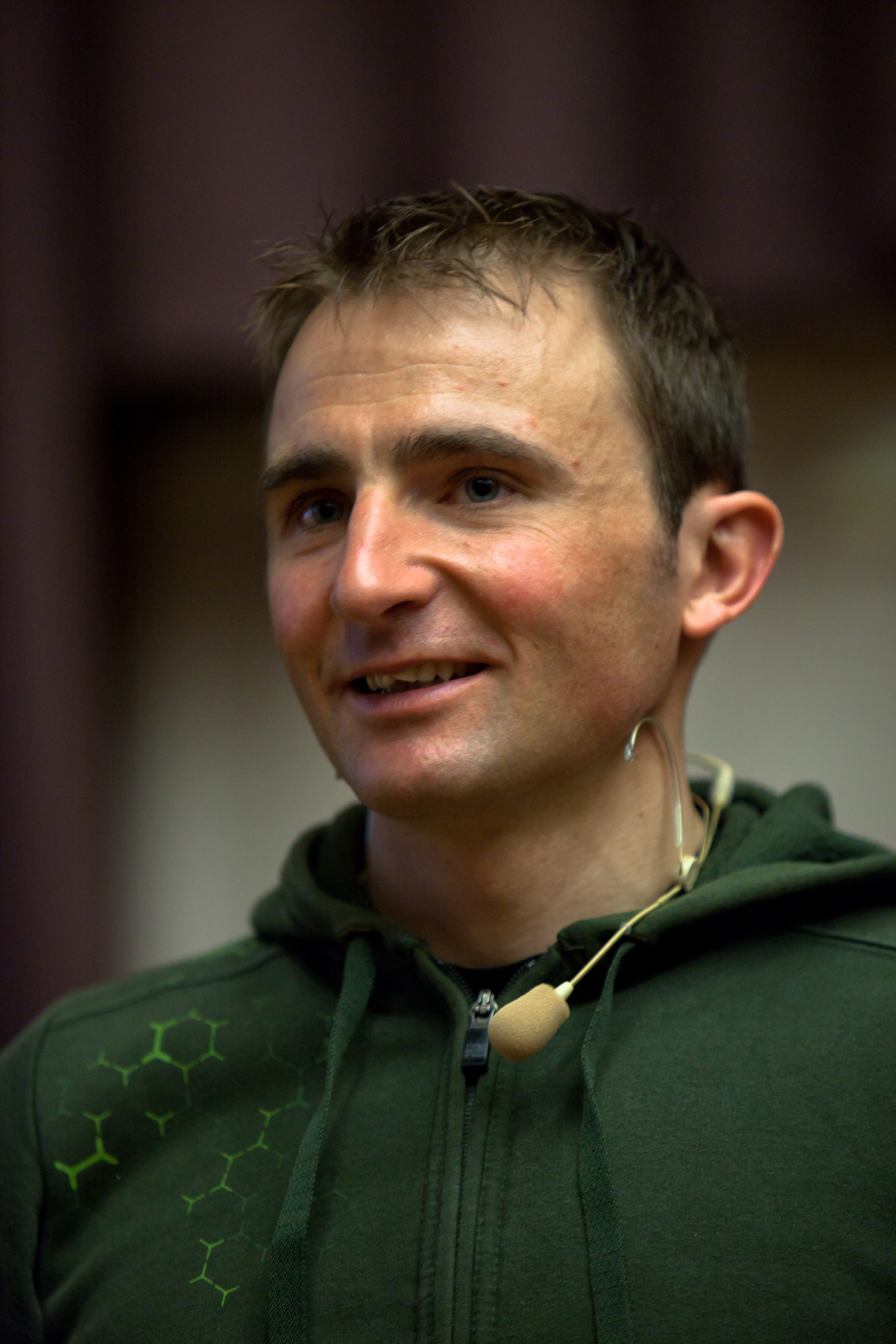
- Steck in 2012

Personal information
- Full name: Ueli Steck
- Nationality: Swiss
- Born: 4 October 1976 Langnau im Emmental, Switzerland
- Died: 30 April 2017 (aged 40) Nuptse, Nepal

Ueli Steck (Alemannic German: [ˈuεli ʃtɛk]; 4 October 1976 – 30 April 2017) was a Swiss rock climber and alpinist. He set speed records on the North Face trilogy in the Alps. He won two Piolet d'Or awards, Including for a solo ascent of the south face of Annapurna, in 2009 and 2014. Steck died after a fall while acclimatizing on the north face of Nuptse.

== Climbing career ==
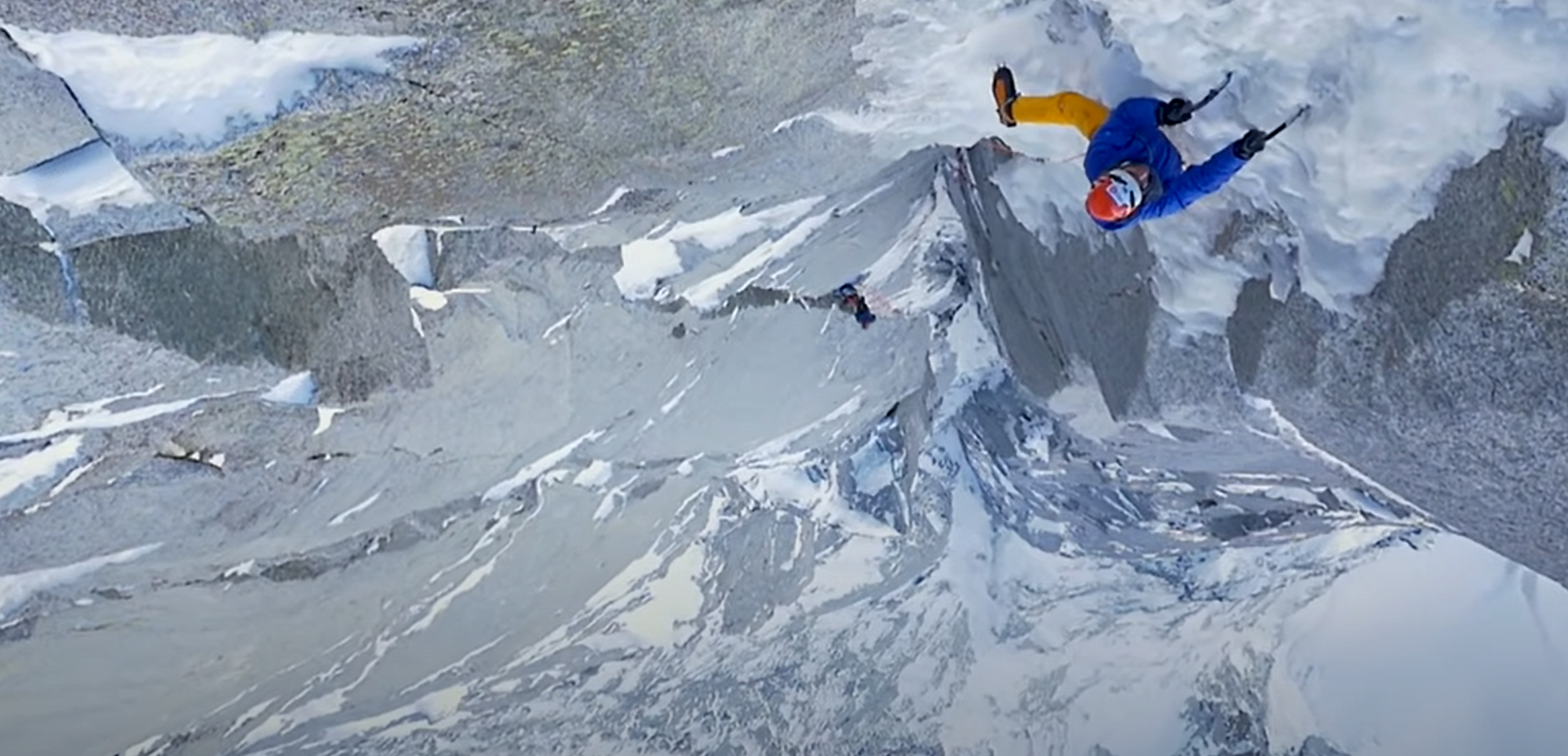
Steck on the North Couloir Direct of Les Drus (ED2, VI, AI 6+, M8)

At the age of 17, Steck achieved the 9th difficulty rating (UIAA) in climbing. As an 18-year-old he climbed the North Face of the Eiger and the Bonatti Pillar in the Mont Blanc massif. In June 2004, he and Stephan Siegrist climbed the Eiger, Mönch and Jungfrau within 25 hours. Another success was the so-called "Khumbu-Express Expedition" in 2005, for which the climbing magazine Climb named him one of the three best alpinists in Europe. The project consisted of the first solo climb of the north wall of Cholatse (6,440 m) and the east wall of Taboche (6505 m).

Steck set his first speed record on the North Face of the Eiger in 2007, climbing it in 3 hours and 54 minutes. The record was lowered by Steck himself to 2 hours 47 minutes 33 seconds the following year.

In May 2008, climbing Annapurna, he broke off his ascent due to an avalanche threat, but the next week climbed to assist Spanish climber Iñaki Ochoa de Olza, who had collapsed. Medical help was slow in coming and the Spanish climber died despite Steck's help.

In 2008, Steck was the first recipient of the Eiger Award for his mountaineering achievements.

On 27 April 2013, while climbing with Simone Moro to prepare for a traverse next spring of Everest and Lhotse, Steck got into an altercation with disgruntled sherpas that according to The Guardian: "... went viral and Steck, wholly blameless in the affair, became severely depressed and disheartened".

On 8 and 9 October 2013 Steck soloed the Lafaille route on the South Face of Annapurna, on the main and highest part of the face; this was his third attempt on the route and has been called "one of the most impressive Himalayan climbs in history", with Steck taking 28 hours to make the trip from Base Camp to summit and back again. The veracity of his claim was questioned by some due to absence of any photographs or GPS tracking data. Steck's claim, however, was supported by two sherpas from his team. Steck's feat was the first solo ascent of Annapurna, which won him his second Piolet d'Or.

In the winter of 2014/15, Steck and Michael Wohlleben linked up the three north faces of the Tre Cime di Lavaredo/Drei Zinnen in 16 hours. In the summer of 2015, he climbed all 82 summits in the Alps higher than 4000 meters in 62 days without the use of motorized travel. Two days slower than the 60-day record, his time included a period when Steck had suspended the tour on 22 July, after his climbing partner on the Aiguille de Rochefort, Martijn Seuren, had fallen to his death on this final peak to make him the first Dutch person to climb all 82 4000ers. Later that year Steck set a new record for the North Face of the Eiger, soloing it in 2 hours 22 minutes and 50 seconds.

In April 2016, Steck and his German mountaineering partner, David Göttler, found the bodies of Alex Lowe and paraglider David Bridges. Lowe and Bridges were killed in an avalanche in 1999 while searching for a route up Shishapangma to attempt the first ski descent.

== Personal life and death ==
Steck was born as the third son to a copper smith in the town of Langnau in the Emmental valley in Switzerland. As a child he played hockey and joined his father on ski tours. He was a carpenter by training and in adulthood lived in Ringgenberg, near Interlaken, Switzerland. Steck was married to Nicole Steck at the time of his death.

=== Death ===
Having previously summitted Everest, Steck wanted to attempt the Hornbein route on the West Ridge without supplemental oxygen. This route had been climbed only a few times, the last of which was in 1991. His plan was to climb the Hornbein Couloir to the summit, then proceed with a traverse to the peak of Lhotse, the world's fourth highest mountain. This combination had not been achieved.

On 16 April 2017, during preparations for the attempt, his climbing partner Tenji Sherpa suffered frostbite, which would take some weeks to heal. Steck carried on with scouting and acclimatisation, climbing up to Everest's Camp 2, en route to the South Col. On 29 April, he changed his plans, texting Tenji that he would climb the nearby peak of Nuptse instead, and did not respond to a follow-up question.

Les Drus: North Couloir Direct

On 30 April, he began climbing at around 4:30 AM with a French climber named Yannick Graziani who was attempting to climb Everest. When Graziani headed towards Camp 3, Steck broke off to the right to climb Nuptse. He was last seen partway up the face around dawn by several Sherpas and expedition members around the valley. Approximately 300 metres (980 ft) below the summit, he fell an estimated 1,000 metres (3,300 ft). It is not known what caused the fall. His body was found in the Western Cwm, between camps 1 and 2, and transported back to Kathmandu, where memorial services were held.

== Awards ==
- 2008 Eiger Award for his alpinistic performances
- 2009 Piolet d'Or for his new route on Tengkampoche's north face with Simon Anthamatten
- 2010 Karl Unterkircher Award for his climbing versatility
- 2014 Piolet d'Or for his solo ascent of Annapurna's south face
- 2015 National Geographic Adventurer of the Year
- 2017 The George Mallory Award - Wasatch Mountain Film Festival

== In film ==
- Race to the Summit, a 2023 documentary film about the rivalry between Ueli Steck and Dani Arnold in setting solo alpine speed records.

== See also ==
- Grade milestones in rock climbing
- History of rock climbing
