= 2018 in ice climbing =

| List of years in ice climbing |
- … 2009; 2010; 2011; 2012; 2013; 2014; 2015; 2016; 2017; 2018; 2019; 2020; 2021; 2022; 2023; 2024; 2025; 2026; 2027; 2028; 2029 …
- In sports 2016 2017 2018 2019 2020 2021 2022
- Art; Archaeology; Architecture; Literature; Music; Philosophy; Science; +...

This article lists the main ice climbing events and their results for 2018.

== World Youth Championships ==
The 2018 UIAA Ice Climbing World Youth Championships were held in Malbun, Liechtenstein.

| Date | Location | Discipline | Men | Women |
|---|---|---|---|---|
| January 5 – 7 | (Liechtenstein) Malbun | U16 Lead | (Russia) Maksim Reshetnikov | (Russia) Evgeniia Iashkova |
| January 5 – 7 | (Liechtenstein) Malbun | U16 Speed | (Russia) Danila Bikulov | (Russia) Olga Vylegzhanina |
| January 5 – 7 | (Liechtenstein) Malbun | U19 Lead | (France) Louna Ladevant | (Russia) Valeriia Bogdan |
| January 5 – 7 | (Liechtenstein) Malbun | U19 Speed | (Russia) Nikita Glazyrin | (Russia) Valeriia Bogdan |
| January 5 – 7 | (Liechtenstein) Malbun | U22 Lead | (Switzerland) Lukas Goetz | (Switzerland) Sina Goetz |
| January 5 – 7 | (Liechtenstein) Malbun | U22 Speed | (Russia) Anton Sukharev | (Russia) Diana Galimova |

== World Cup ==
| Date | Location | Discipline | Men | Women |
|---|---|---|---|---|
| January 18 – 20 | (Switzerland) Saas-Fee | Lead | (Russia) Alexey Dengin | (South Korea) Han Na Rai Song |
| January 18 – 20 | (Switzerland) Saas-Fee | Speed | (Russia) Nikolai Kuzovlev | (Russia) Ekaterina Feoktistova |
| January 25 – 27 | (Italy) Rabenstein | Lead | (Iran) Mohammadreza Safdarian Korouyeh | (South Korea) Han Na Rai Song |
| January 25 – 27 | (Italy) Rabenstein | Speed | (Russia) Anton Nemov | (Russia) Nadezda Gallyamova |
| February 2 – 4 | (China) Hohhot | Lead | (Russia) Alexey Dengin | (South Korea) Shin Woonseon |
| February 2 – 4 | (China) Hohhot | Speed | (Russia) Ivan Spitsyn | (Russia) Natalia Belyaeva |
| February 9 – 11 | (South Korea) Cheongsong | Lead | (Russia) Alexey Dengin | (South Korea) Shin Woonseon |
| February 9 – 11 | (South Korea) Cheongsong | Speed | (Russia) Nikolai Kuzovlev | (Russia) Ekaterina Koshcheeva |
| March 2 – 4 | (Russia) Kirov | Lead | (Russia) Nikolai Kuzovlev | (Russia) Maria Tolokonina |
| March 2 – 4 | (Russia) Kirov | Speed | (Russia) Nikita Glazyrin | (Russia) Valeriia Bogdan |
| Overall season winners | | Lead | (Russia) Maksim Tomilov | (South Korea) Shin Woonseon |
| Overall season winners | | Speed | (Russia) Nikolai Kuzovlev | (Russia) Ekaterina Koshcheeva |

== European Cup ==
| Date | Location | Discipline | Men | Women |
|---|---|---|---|---|
| December 2, 2017 | (Slovenia) Domžale | Lead | (France) Louna Ladevant | (Italy) Angelika Rainer |
| December 9, 2017 | (Slovakia) Bratislava | Lead | (France) Louna Ladevant | (Italy) Angelika Rainer |
| January 11 – 13, 2018 | (France) Champagny-en-Vanoise | Lead | (France) Louna Ladevant | (Russia) Maria Tolokonina |
| January 11 – 13, 2018 | (France) L'Argentière-la-Bessée | Speed | (France) Tristan Ladevent | (Russia) Maria Tolokonina |
| February 24 – 25, 2018 | (Finland) Oulu | Lead | (Canada) Noah Beek | (Finland) Mira Alhonsuo |
| February 24 – 25, 2018 | (Finland) Oulu | Speed | (Netherlands) Dennis van Hoek | (Finland) Mira Alhonsuo |
| Overall season winners | | Lead | (France) Louna Ladevant | (Italy) Angelika Rainer |
| Overall season winners | | Speed | (Netherlands) Dennis van Hoek | (Finland) Mira Alhonsuo |
