= 2019 in ice climbing =

This article lists the main ice climbing events and their results for 2019, including the UIAA Ice Climbing World Youth Championships, the UIAA Ice Climbing World Championships, the UIAA Ice Climbing World Cup, and the Ice Climbing European Cup.

== World Championships ==
Date	Location	Discipline	Men's winner	Women's winner
December 15 – 16, 2018	(Russia) Moscow	Combined	(Russia) Nikolai Kuzovlev	(Russia) Maria Tolokonina
February 28 – March 2, 2019	(Finland) Oulu	U16 Lead	(United States) Keenan Griscom	(Russia) Daria Glotova
February 28 – March 2, 2019	(Finland) Oulu	U16 Speed	(Russia) Danila Naumov	(Russia) Daria Glotova
February 28 – March 2, 2019	(Finland) Oulu	U19 Lead	(Russia) Ivan Loshchenko	(Ukraine) Victoria Holub
February 28 – March 2, 2019	(Finland) Oulu	U19 Speed	(Russia) Nikita Glazyrin	(Russia) Irina Dubovtseva
February 28 – March 2, 2019	(Finland) Oulu	U22 Lead	(Switzerland) Yannick Glatthard	(Switzerland) Sina Goetz
February 28 – March 2, 2019	(Finland) Oulu	U22 Speed	(Russia) Vadim Malshchukov	(Russia) Valeriia Bogdan
March 8 – 10, 2019	(Russia) Kirov	Lead	(Russia) Nikolai Kuzovlev	(South Korea) Woon-Seon Shin
March 8 – 10, 2019	(Russia) Kirov	Speed	(Russia) Vladislav Iurlov	(Russia) Maria Tolokonina

== World Cup ==
Date	Location	Discipline	Men's winner	Women's winner
January 11 – 13	(South Korea) Cheongsong	Lead	(Russia) Nikolai Kuzovlev	(Russia) Maria Tolokonina
January 11 – 13	(South Korea) Cheongsong	Speed	(Russia) Anton Nemov	(Russia) Maria Tolokonina
January 18 – 20	(China) Beijing	Lead	(Russia) Nikolai Kuzovlev	(Russia) Maria Tolokonina
January 18 – 20	(China) Beijing	Speed	(Russia) Vladislav Iurlov	(Russia) Ekaterina Koshcheeva
January 24 – 26	(Switzerland) Saas-Fee	Lead	(Switzerland) Yannick Glatthard	(South Korea) Woon-Seon Shin
January 24 – 26	(Switzerland) Saas-Fee	Speed	(Russia) Anton Nemov	(Russia) Valeriia Bogdan
February 1 – 3	(Italy) Rabenstein	Lead	(Russia) Nikolai Kuzovlev	(Russia) Maria Tolokonina
February 1 – 3	(Italy) Rabenstein	Speed	(Russia) Anton Nemov	(Russia) Ekaterina Feoktistova
February 8 – 10	(France) Champagny-en-Vanoise	Lead	(Russia) Nikolai Kuzovlev	(Russia) Maria Tolokonina
February 8 – 10	(France) Champagny-en-Vanoise	Speed	(Russia) Anton Nemov	(Russia) Natalia Savitskaia
February 22 – 24	(United States) Denver (Finals)	Lead	(Switzerland) Yannick Glatthard	(Russia) Maria Tolokonina
February 22 – 24	(United States) Denver (Finals)	Speed	(Russia) Nikolai Kuzovlev	(Russia) Maria Tolokonina
Overall season winners		Lead	(Russia) Nikolai Kuzovlev	(Russia) Maria Tolokonina
Overall season winners		Speed	(Russia) Anton Nemov	(Russia) Ekaterina Koshcheeva

== European Cup ==
Date	Location	Discipline	Men's winner	Women's winner
November 24, 2018	(Switzerland) Bern	Lead	(France) Louna Ledevant	(Switzerland) Sina Goetz
December 1, 2018	(Slovenia) Domžale	Lead	(Russia) Nikolai Primerov	(Switzerland) Sina Goetz
December 8, 2018	(Slovakia) Žilina	Lead	(Slovakia) Peter Kuric	(Slovenia) Maja Šuštar
March 3, 2019	(Finland) Oulu (Finals)	Lead	(France) Louna Ledevant	(Switzerland) Sina Goetz
Overall season winners		Lead	(France) Louna Ledevant	(Switzerland) Sina Goetz
