= UIAA Ice Climbing World Championships =

Biennial ice climbing event

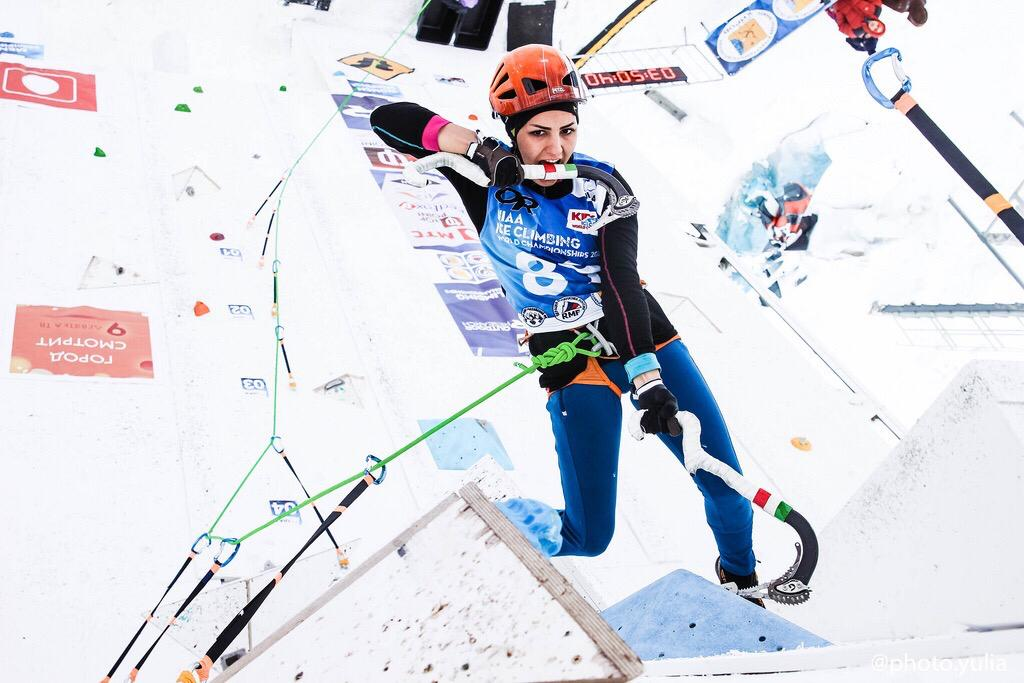
Iranian ice climber Zeinabkobra Moosavi competing in the lead climbing event at the 2019 UIAA Ice Climbing World Championship

The Ice Climbing World Championship is a biennial international competition ice climbing event organized and regulated by the UIAA. It is the ice climbing equivalent of the IFSC Climbing World Championships in rock climbing.

== Events ==
#	Year	Venue	Date	Disciplines				Ref.
#	Year	Venue	Date	Event	L	S	C	Ref.
1	2002	Arzl im Pitztal, Austria	11–12 January	4	X	X		
2	2003	Kirov, Russia	8–10 March	4	X	X		
3	2004	Saas-Fee, Switzerland	22–24 January	4	X	X		
4	2005	Saas-Fee, Switzerland	20–22 January	4	X	X		
5	2007	Saas-Fee, Switzerland	1–3 February	4	X			
5	2007	Bușteni, Romania	8–9 February	4		X		
6	2009	Saas-Fee, Switzerland	22–24 January	4	X	X		
7	2011	Bușteni, Romania	5–6 February	4	X			
7	2011	Kirov, Russia	6–8 March	4		X		
8	2013	Cheongsong, South Korea	12–13 January	4	X			
8	2013	Kirov, Russia	8–10 March	4		X		
9	2015	Rabenstein, Italy	30 Jan – 1 Feb	4	X			
9	2015	Kirov, Russia	6–8 March	4		X		
10	2017	Champagny-en-Vanoise, France	4–5 February	4	X	X		
11	2018	Moscow, Russia	15–16 December	2			X	
12	2019	Kirov, Russia	8–10 March	4	X	X		
13	2022	Saas-Fee, Switzerland	26–29 January	6	X	X	X	
14	2024	Edmonton, Canada	16–18 February	4	X	X		

== Men's results ==
=== Lead ===
Year	Gold	Silver	Bronze
2002	(Ukraine) Evgeny Kriovsheitsev	(France) Stéphane Husson	(Austria) Thomas Steinbrugger
2003	(Ukraine) Evgeny Kriovsheitsev	(Russia) Oleg Chereshnev	(Austria) Harald Berger
2004	(Austria) Harald Berger	(Ukraine) Evgeny Kriovsheitsev	(Switzerland) Samuel Anthamatten
2005	(Austria) Harald Berger	(Switzerland) Simon Anthamatten	(Austria) Albert Leichtfried
2007	(Ukraine) Evgeny Kriovsheitsev	(Russia) Alexey Tomilov	(Switzerland) Simon Wandeler
2009	(Austria) Markus Bendler	(Italy) Herbert Klammer	(Russia) Maxim Tomilov
2011	(South Korea) Park Hee-yong	(Austria) Markus Bendler	(Ukraine) Evgeny Kriovsheitsev
2013	(Russia) Alexey Tomilov	(Ukraine) Valentyn Sypavin	(South Korea) Park Hee-yong
2015	(Russia) Maxim Tomilov	(South Korea) Park Hee-yong	(Russia) Alexey Tomilov
2017	(South Korea) Park Hee-yong	(Switzerland) Yannick Glatthard	(Russia) Nikolai Kuzovlev
2019	(Russia) Nikolai Kuzovlev	(Russia) Maxim Tomilov	(Russia) Aleksei Marshalov
2022	(France) Louna Ladevant	(Switzerland) Benjamin Bosshard	(France) Tristan Ladevant
2024	(South Korea) Lee Young-geon	(United States) Keenan Griscom	(Switzerland) Benjamin Bosshard

=== Speed ===
Year	Gold	Silver	Bronze
2002	(Russia) Alexander Matveev	(Ukraine) Evgeny Kriovsheitsev	(Switzerland) Urs Odermatt
2003	(Russia) Alexander Matveev	(Ukraine) Evgeny Kriovsheitsev	(Russia) Alexei Vagin
2004	(Russia) Alexander Matveev	(Russia) Nikolai Kuzovlev	(Russia) Igor Fayzullin
2005	(Ukraine) Evgeny Kriovsheitsev	(Russia) Igor Fayzullin	(Russia) Nikolai Kuzovlev
2007	(Russia) Igor Fayzullin	(Russia) Maxim Vlasov	(Russia) Andrey Belkov
2009	(Russia) Pavel Gulyaev	(Russia) Pavel Batushev	(Bulgaria) Tihomir Dimitrov
2011	(Russia) Pavel Gulyaev	(Russia) Ivan Spitsyn	(Russia) Pavel Batushev
2013	(Russia) Egor Trapeznikov	(Russia) Radomir Proshchenko	(Russia) Ivan Spitsyn
2015	(Russia) Alexey Yagin	(Russia) Radomir Proshchenko	(Russia) Egor Trapeznikov
2017	(Russia) Vladimir Kartashev	(Russia) Leonid Malykh	(Russia) Radomir Proshchenko
2019	(Russia) Vladislav Iurlov	(Russia) Anton Sukharev	(Russia) Anton Nemov
2022	(Iran) Mohsen Beheshti Rad	(Russia) Nikita Glazyrin	(Russia) Danila Bikulov
2024	(Iran) Mohammad Reza Safdarian	(Mongolia) Kherlen Nyamdoo	(Iran) Mohsen Beheshti Rad

=== Combined ===
Year	Gold	Silver	Bronze
2018	(Russia) Nikolai Kuzovlev	(Russia) Nikita Glazyrin	(Iran) Mohammad Reza Safdarian
2022	(Iran) Mohammad Reza Safdarian	(Liechtenstein) Andreas Gantner	(Russia) Vadim Malshchukov

== Women's results ==
=== Lead ===
Year	Gold	Silver	Bronze
2002	(Germany) Ines Papert	(Italy) Anna Torretta	(Australia) Abby Watkins
2003	(Germany) Ines Papert	(Russia) Marina Rashitova	(Russia) Marina Maslova
2004	(Germany) Ines Papert	(Russia) Natalya Kulikova	(Germany) Kirsten Buchmann
2005	(Switzerland) Petra Müller	(Germany) Ines Papert	(France) Stephanie Maureau
2007	(Italy) Jenny Lavarda	(France) Stephanie Maureau	(Switzerland) Petra Müller
2009	(Italy) Angelika Rainer	(Switzerland) Petra Müller	(Russia) Maria Tolokonina
2011	(Italy) Angelika Rainer	(South Korea) Shin Woon Seon	(Russia) Anna Gallyamova
2013	(Italy) Angelika Rainer	(Russia) Anna Gallyamova	(South Korea) Shin Woon Seon
2015	(South Korea) Shin Woon Seon	(Italy) Angelika Rainer	(Switzerland) Petra Klingler
2017	(South Korea) Shin Woon Seon	(Italy) Angelika Rainer	(Russia) Maria Tolokonina
2019	(South Korea) Shin Woon Seon	(Russia) Maria Tolokonina	(Russia) Maryam Filippova
2022	(Switzerland) Petra Klingler	(Russia) Anastasia Astakhova	(Switzerland) Franziska Schönbächler
2024	(South Korea) Shin Woon Seon	(Switzerland) Sina Goetz	(Switzerland) Franziska Schönbächler

=== Speed ===
Year	Gold	Silver	Bronze
2002	(Germany) Ines Papert	(Russia) Nadezhda Yakimova	(Russia) Margarita Kolodkina
2003	(Russia) Natalya Kulikova	(Russia) Nadezhda Yakimova	(Russia) Elizaveta Petenko
2004	(Russia) Natalya Kulikova	(Russia) Maryam Filippova	(Russia) Julia Oleynikova
2005	(Russia) Natalya Kulikova	(Russia) Julia Oleynikova	(Italy) Anna Torretta
2007	(Russia) Maria Shabalina	(Russia) Natalya Kulikova	(South Korea) Shin Woon Seon
2009	(Russia) Maria Tolokonina	(Russia) Nadezhda Shubina	(Russia) Maryam Filippova
2011	(Russia) Maria Tolokonina	(Russia) Maria Krasavina	(Russia) Nadezhda Gallyamova
2013	(Russia) Ekaterina Koshcheeva	(Russia) Julia Oleynikova	(Russia) Maryam Filippova
2015	(Russia) Ekaterina Koshcheeva	(Russia) Nadezhda Gallyamova	(Russia) Maria Krasavina
2017	(Russia) Maria Tolokonina	(Russia) Ekaterina Feoktistova	(Russia) Nadezhda Gallyamova
2019	(Russia) Maria Tolokonina	(Russia) Natalia Savitskaia	(Russia) Valeria Bogdan
2022	(Russia) Natalia Savitskaia	(Russia) Iuliia Filateva	(Russia) Maria Tolokonina
2024	(Czech Republic) Aneta Loužecká	(Liechtenstein) Lea Beck	(Mongolia) Selenge Nyamdoo

=== Combined ===
Year	Gold	Silver	Bronze
2018	(Russia) Maria Tolokonina	(Russia) Valeria Bogdan	(Russia) Maryam Filippova
2022	(Russia) Iuliia Filateva	(Switzerland) Vivien Labarile	(Russia) Irina Dubovtseva

== See also ==
- UIAA Ice Climbing World Cup
- UIAA Ice Climbing World Youth Championships
- IFSC Climbing World Championships
- Mixed climbing
- Dry-tooling
