= Friburge =

Small hamlet in the French Alps

Coordinates: 45°27′N 6°46′E

Friburge is a small hamlet in Champagny-en-Vanoise in the French Alps.

The nearest towns are Champagny, Brides-les-Bains, and Moûtiers. Friburge is historically significant as the possible birthplace of Pope Innocent V, and for the fact that it is commonly confused with the town of Freiburg. The heavy stone-built dwellings, bafflingly described by Pevsner as Tirolean vernacular, are situated under a large bluff. Many of the houses have been refurbished as second residences. In the winter, the road becomes impassable, and is groomed for cross country skiing between Le Bois and Laisonnay. The hills around Friburge are riddled with marmots, which some of the locals are known to hunt, using primitive traditional weapons such as the crossbow, and eat in a famous marmot stew named 'lamarmotta'. The locals have a tradition of occasionally erecting igloos.
