= UIAA Ice Climbing World Cup =

Multi-event annual tour

2016 UIAA Ice Climbing World Cup, Cheongsong.

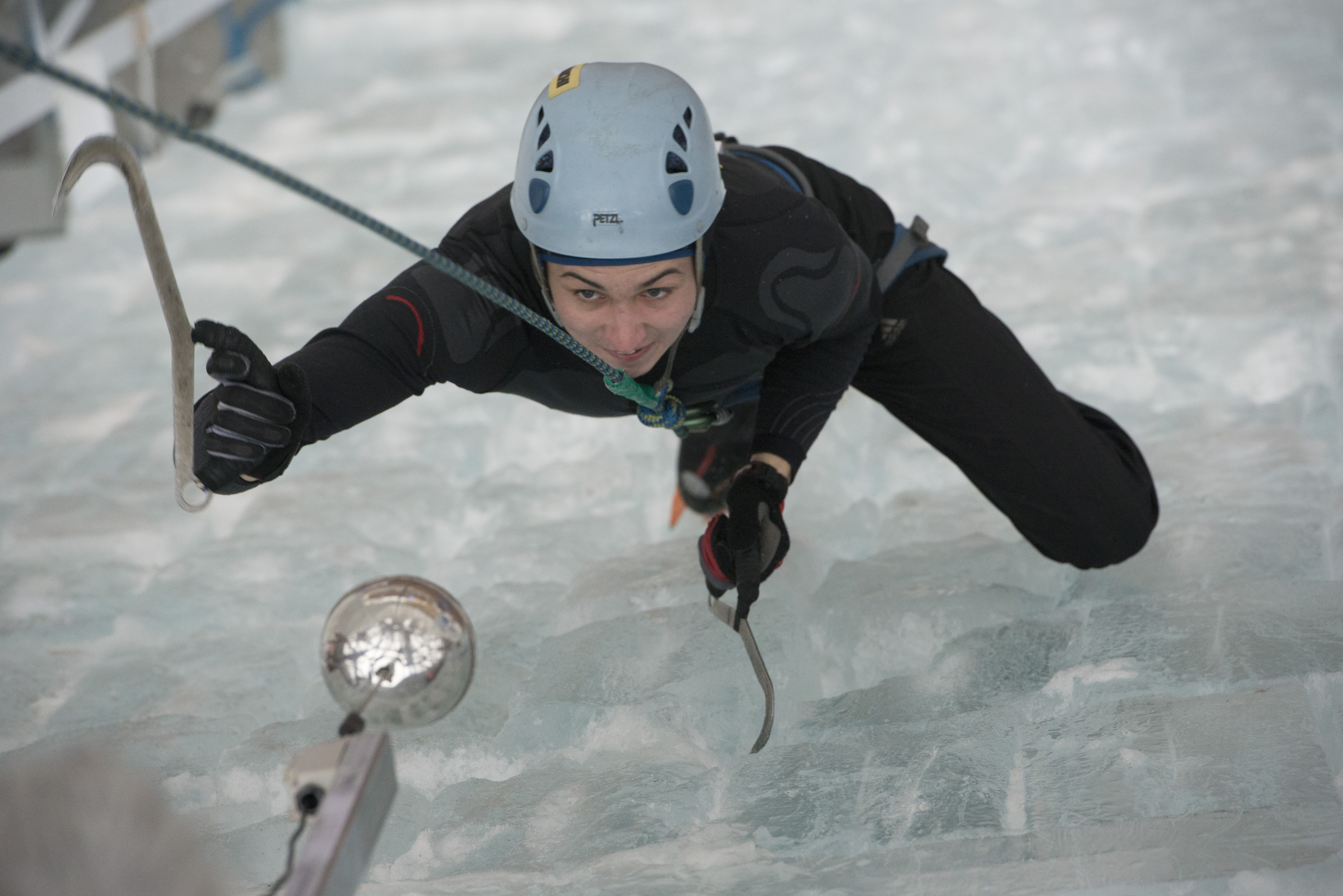
Speed ice climbing on natural ice

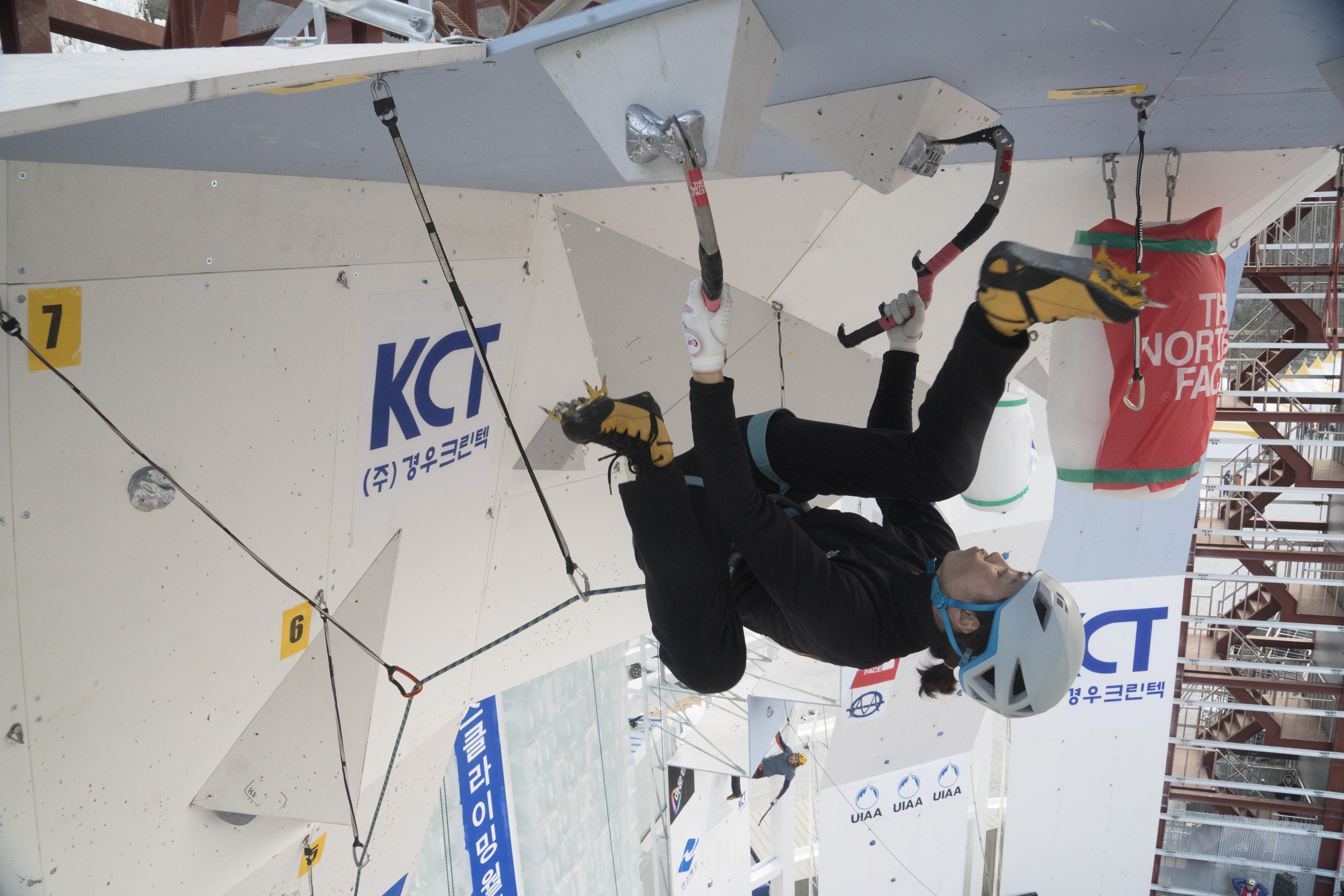
Lead ice climbing on a dry surface

The Ice Climbing World Cup (or UIAA Ice Climbing World Tour, or IWC) is an annual ice climbing competition organized by the International Climbing and Mountaineering Federation (UIAA), who has regulated and governed the sport of competition ice climbing since the first IWC in 2000. It is the ice climbing equivalent of the IFSC Climbing World Cup in rock climbing.

== Structure ==
The IWC is organized as an annual tour consisting of three to six events throughout the season (the number has varied over the years), in which men's and women's lead climbing and speed climbing competitions are held. The lead climbing routes are held on largely bolted dry artificial surfaces (with some natural ice features) and thus employ dry-tooling techniques. The speed-climbing routes are on a standardized 12-18 meter (40-50 foot) wall of solid ice that takes seconds for top roped ice climbers to complete (as per speed rock climbing).

Over the years, the UIAA has increased the regulation and use around competition ice climbing equipment, including the prohibition of leashes on ice tools (so they cannot be used as aid), and increased controls on the use of "heel spurs" while climbing (to counter their use for resting).

== Men's results ==
=== Lead ===
Year	Winner	Second	Third
2000	(Canada) Will Gadd		
2001	(France) Daniel Du Lac		
2002	(Russia) Dimitri Bytchkov (Austria) Harald Berger	—	
2003	(Austria) Harald Berger	(Russia) Alexey Tomilov	(Russia) Dimitri Bytchkov
2004	no world tour		
2005	no world tour		
2006	(Austria) Harald Berger	(Switzerland) Simon Wandler	(Austria) Markus Bendler
2007	(Ukraine) Evgeny Kriovsheitsev	(Austria) Markus Bendler	(Russia) Alexey Tomilov
2008	(Switzerland) Simon Anthamatten	(Austria) Markus Bendler	(Ukraine) Evgeny Kriovsheitsev
2009	(Austria) Markus Bendler	(South Korea) Park Hee Yong	(Russia) Alexey Tomilov
2010	(Austria) Markus Bendler	(South Korea) Park Hee Yong	(Russia) Maxim Tomilov
2011	(South Korea) Park Hee Yong	(Russia) Maxim Tomilov	(Austria) Markus Bendler
2012	(Russia) Maxim Tomilov	(Russia) Alexey Tomilov	(South Korea) Park Hee Yong
2013	(South Korea) Park Hee Yong	(Russia) Maxim Tomilov	(Ukraine) Valentyn Sypavin
2014	(Russia) Maxim Tomilov	(South Korea) Park Hee Yong	(Russia) Alexey Tomilov
2015	(Russia) Maxim Tomilov	(South Korea) Park Hee Yong	(Russia) Alexey Tomilov
2016	(Russia) Maxim Tomilov	(South Korea) Hee Yong Park	(Slovenia) Janez Svoljsak
2017	(South Korea) Park Hee Yong	(Russia) Nikolai Kuzovlev	(Russia) Maxim Tomilov
2018	(Russia) Maxim Tomilov	(Russia) Alexey Tomilov	(Iran) Mohamadreza Safdarian Korouyeh
2019	(Russia) Nikolai Kuzovlev	(South Korea) Park Hee Yong	(Switzerland) Yannick Glatthard
2020	(France) Louna Ladevant	(Russia) Nikolai Kuzovlev	(South Korea) Kwon Younghye
2023	(France) Louna Ladevant	(South Korea) Park Hee Yong	(Switzerland) Benjamin Bosshard
2024	(South Korea) Younggeon Lee	(United States) Keenan Griscom	(France) Virgile Devin
2025	(Switzerland) Benjamin Bosshard	(South Korea) Younggeon Lee	(France) Louna Ladevant

=== Speed ===
Year	Winner	Second	Third
2006	(Russia) Maxim Vlasov	(Switzerland) Urs Odermatt	(Russia) Igor Fayzullin
2007	(Russia) Alexander Matveev	(Russia) Nikolay Shved	(Russia) Igor Fayzullin
2008	(Slovenia) Matevz Vukotic	(Russia) Maxim Tomilov	(Russia) Kirill Kolchegoshev
2009	(Russia) Pavel Gulyaev		
2010	(Russia) Pavel Gulyaev	(Russia) Pavel Batushev	(Russia) Igor Fayzullin
2011	(Russia) Pavel Batushev	(Russia) Pavel Gulyaev	(Russia) Maxim Tomilov
2012	(Russia) Kirill Kolchegoshev	(Russia) Alexey Tomilov	(Russia) Pavel Batushev
2013	(Russia) Egor Trapeznikov	(Russia) Ivan Spitsyn	(Russia) Pavel Gulyaev
2014	(Russia) Nikolay Kuzovlev	(Russia) Vladimir Kartashev	(Russia) Alexey Vagin
2015	(Russia) Nikolay Kuzovlev	(Russia) Vladimir Kartashev	(Russia) Egor Trapeznikov
2016	(Russia) Maxim Tomilov	(Russia) Alexey Vagin	(Russia) Vladimir Kartashev
2017	(Russia) Vladimir Kartashev	(Russia) Radomir Proshchenko*	(Russia) Leonid Malykh
2018	(Russia) Nikolay Kuzovlev	(Russia) Ivan Spitsyn	(Russia) Anton Nemov
2019	(Russia) Anton Nemov	(Russia) Nikolay Kuzovlev	(Russia) Vladislav Iurlov
2020	(Russia) Anton Nemov	(Russia) Nikita Glazyrin	(Russia) Nikolay Kuzovlev
2023	(Iran) Mohsen Beheshti Rad	(South Korea) Myungwook Yang	(Iran) Mohammad Reza Safdarian
2024	(Mongolia) Mandakhbayar Chuluunbaatar	(Iran) Mohammad Reza Safdarian	(Iran) Mohsen Beheshti Rad
2025	(Mongolia) Mandakhbayar Chuluunbaatar	(Iran) Mohammad Reza Safdarian	(Mongolia) Kherlen Nyamdoo

* 2017: 2. Pavel Batushev doping

== Women's results ==
=== Lead ===
Year	Winner	Second	Third
2000	(Canada) Kim Csizmazia		
2001	(Germany) Ines Papert		
2002	(Russia) Ksenia Sdobnikova	(Germany) Ines Papert	
2003	(Germany) Ines Papert	(Russia) Ksenia Sdobnikova	(Germany) Kirsten Buchmann
2004	no world tour		
2005	no world tour		
2006	(Germany) Ines Papert	(Italy) Anna Torretta	(France) Stephanie Maureau
2007	(Italy) Jenny Lavarda	(Switzerland) Petra Müller	(France) Stephanie Maureau
2008	(Italy) Jenny Lavarda	(Switzerland) Petra Müller	(Russia) Natalya Kulikova
2009	(Russia) Maria Tolokonina	(Italy) Angelika Rainer	(France) Stephanie Maureau
2010	(Russia) Anna Gallyamova	(Italy) Angelika Rainer	(France) Stephanie Maureau
2011	(Russia) Anna Gallyamova	(Czech Republic) Lucie Hrozova	(South Korea) Shin Woon Seon
2012	(Italy) Angelika Rainer	(Russia) Maria Tolokonina	(Russia) Anna Gallyamova
2013	(Russia) Maria Tolokonina	(Italy) Angelika Rainer	(South Korea) Shin Woon Seon
2014	(Russia) Maria Tolokonina	(Italy) Angelika Rainer	(South Korea) Shin Woon Seon
2015	(Italy) Angelika Rainer	(Switzerland) Petra Klingler	(South Korea) Song Han Na Rai
2016	(Russia) Maria Tolokonina	(Russia) Ekaterina Vlasova	(South Korea) Song Han Na Rai
2017	(South Korea) Song Han Na Rai	(Italy) Angelika Rainer	(Russia) Maria Tolokonina
2018	(South Korea) Shin Woon Seon	(Russia) Maria Tolokonina	(South Korea) Song Han Na Rai
2019	(Russia) Maria Tolokonina	(South Korea) Shin Woon Seon	(Republic of Ireland) Eimir McSwiggan
2020	(Russia) Maria Tolokonina	(South Korea) Shin Woon Seon	(Switzerland) Sina Goetz
2023	(Switzerland) Petra Klingler	(Switzerland) Sina Goetz	(South Korea) Shin Woon Seon
2024	(South Korea) Shin Woon Seon	(Switzerland) Sina Goetz	(France) Marion Thomas
2025	(Switzerland) Sina Goetz	(South Korea) Shin Woon Seon	(Netherlands) Marianne van der Steen

=== Speed ===
Year	Winner	Second	Third
2006	(Russia) Julia Oleynikova	(Russia) Natalya Kulikova	(Russia) Maria Shabalina
2007	(Russia) Maria Shabalina	(Russia) Maria Muravyeva	(Russia) Maryam Filippova
2008	(Russia) Maria Tolokonina		
2009	(Russia) Maria Tolokonina	(Russia) Maryam Filippova	(Russia) Julia Oleynikova
2010	(Russia) Nadezda Shubina	(Russia) Viktoria Shabalina	(Russia) Maryam Filippova
2011	(Russia) Maria Tolokonina	(Russia) Natalya Kulikova	(Russia) Irina Bagaeva
2012	(Russia) Maryam Filippova	(Russia) Maria Krasavina	(Russia) Maria Tolokonina
2013	(Russia) Julia Oleynikova	(Russia) Maryam Filippova	(Russia) Ekaterina Feoktistova
2014	(Russia) Maryam Filippova	(Russia) Ekaterina Feoktistova	(Russia) Natalya Kulikova
2015	(Russia) Ekaterina Feoktistova	(Russia) Ekaterina Koshcheeva	(Russia) Maria Krasavina
2016	(Russia) Maria Tolokonina	(Russia) Ekaterina Koshcheeva	(Russia) Maryam Filippova
2017	(Russia) Maria Tolokonina (Russia) Ekaterina Koshcheeva	—	(Russia) Ekaterina Feoktistova
2018	(Russia) Ekaterina Koshcheeva	(Russia) Natalya Kulikova	(Russia) Ekaterina Feoktistova
2019	(Russia) Ekaterina Koshcheeva	(Russia) Maria Tolokonina	(Russia) Natalja Savická
2020	(Russia) Maria Tolokonina	(Russia) Valerija Bogdanová	(Russia) Alena Vlasova
2023	(Switzerland) Vivien Labarile	(Poland) Olga Kosek	(France) Marion Thomas
2024	(Czech Republic) Aneta Louzecka	(Poland) Olga Kosek	(Liechtenstein) Lorena Beck
2025	(Mongolia) Selenge Nyamdoo	(United States) Catalina Shirley	(Czech Republic) Aneta Louzecka

== See also ==
- UIAA Ice Climbing World Championships
- UIAA Ice Climbing World Youth Championships
- Mixed climbing
- Dry-tooling
