= Mohsen Beheshti Rad =

Iranian ice climber

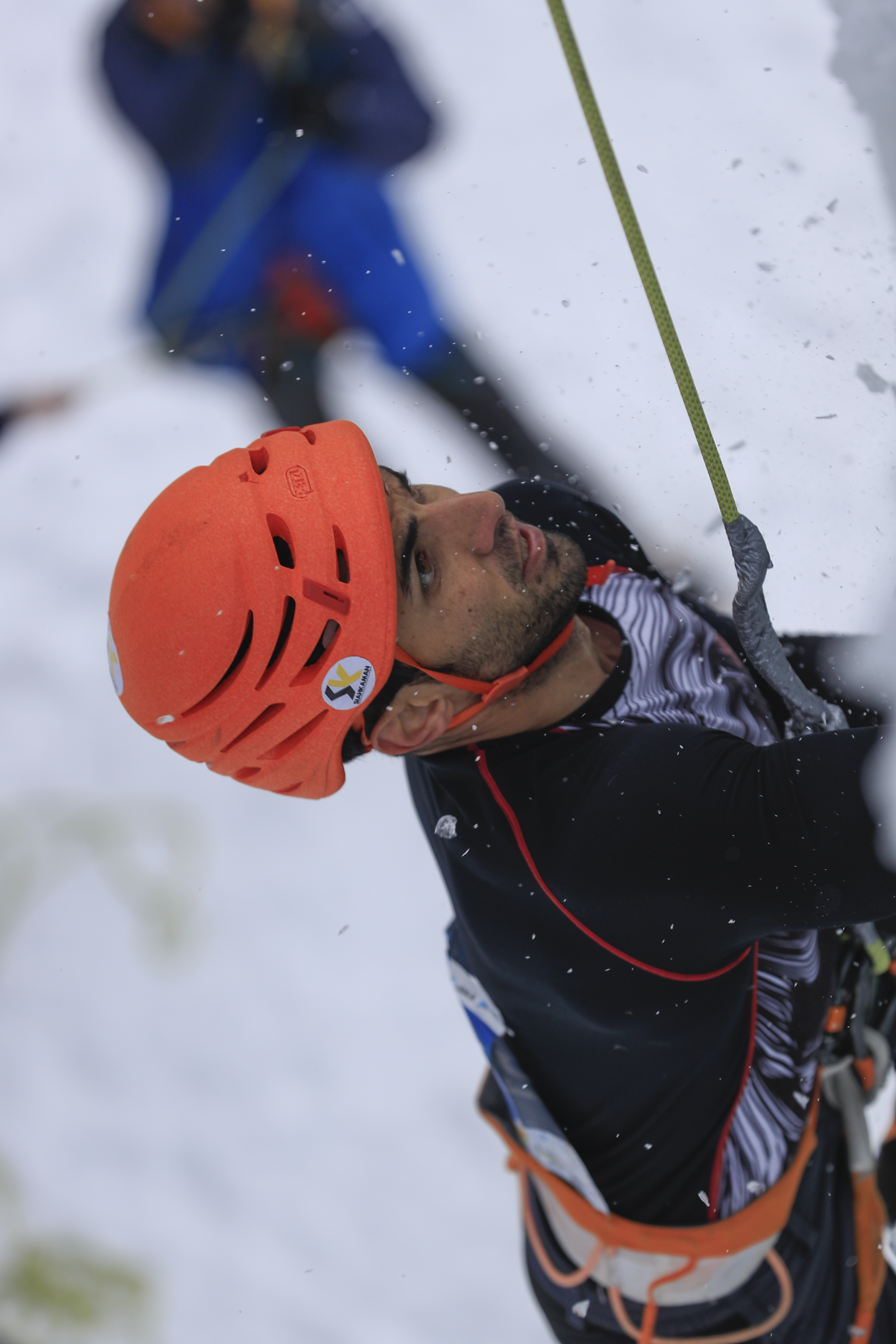
- Competing in the speed climbing event

Personal information
- Native name: محسن بهشتی راد
- Full name: Mohsen Beheshti Rad
- Nickname: horolezec
- Nationality: Iranian
- Born: Qazvin, Iran
- Occupation: Professional climber

Climbing career
- Type of climber: Ice climbing; Competition climbing

Sport
- Country: Iran
- Sport: Competition ice climbing
Medal record
Representing Iran
Men's competition ice climbing
UIAA World Championships
Gold medal – first place	2022 Saas-Fee	Combined
Asian Championships
Gold medal – first place	2018 South Korea	Ice Climbing
Gold medal – first place	2023 South Korea	Ice Climbing
- Updated on 29 March 2024

Mohsen Beheshti Rad (born 12 September 1984) is an Iranian mountaineer and competition climber who competes in competition ice climbing, and has been the UIAA World champion.

== Records and achievements ==
=== Medals ===
- 2018: Asian competition ice climbing champion
- 2022: World champion in competition ice climbing
- 2023: Asian competition ice climbing champion

=== Race results ===
UIAA Ice Climbing World Championships
Year	2017	2018	2022
Lead climbing	4		
Speed climbing	5	8	1
Combined	5		

UIAA Ice Climbing World Cup
Year	2017	2018	2019	2020	2023
Speed climbing	22	7	6	—	1
jednotlivě* (2/1/0)	-,-, 25,12	9,4, 9,6,8	7,6,4, 6,7,-	—	(gold) , (silver) , (gold)

* note: on the right are the last races of the year

Asian Ice Climbing Championship
Year	2018	2020	2023
Speed climbing	1	—	1
