= Valentyn Sypavin =

Ukrainian mountaineer and ice climber

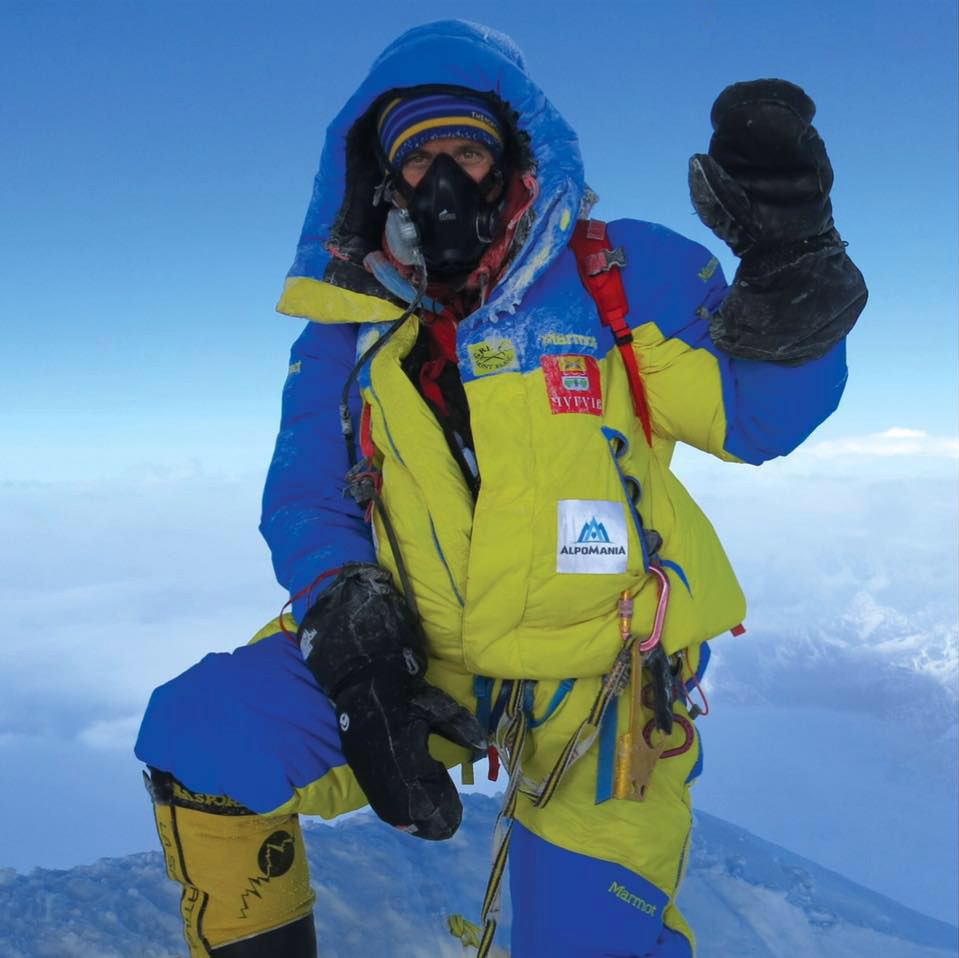
- Valentyn Sypavin on Everest

Personal information
- Born: Valentyn Viktorovych Sypavin; 3 August 1983 (age 43) Kharkiv, Ukraine
- Occupation: Professional climber
- Website: Alpomania

Climbing career
- Type of climber: Ice climbing; Alpine climbing; Competition climbing
Medal record
Men's competition ice climbing
Representing Ukraine
UIAA Ice Climbing
Bronze medal – third place	2013 World Cup	Overall
Silver medal – second place	2013 World Championship	Lead

Valentyn Viktorovych Sypavin (born 3 August 1983, Kharkiv, Ukraine) is a Ukrainian mountaineer and ice climber, who has summited Mount Everest eight times. Following ten rope fixers, who summited on the evening of May 10, 2024, Sypavin became the first non-Nepali of the 2024 Everest season to summit, guided by Sanu Sherpa, on May 11, 2024 at 4:00 am. In 2013, Sypavin became the third in the overall UIAA Ice Climbing World Cup and came second in the UIAA Ice Climbing World Championships.

== Climbing career ==
Sypavin started ice climbing in 2008 when he began training and actively participating in competition ice climbing events. He also established several dry-tooling venues in Crimea.

Sypavin later started working as a mountain guide and founded his own adventure company called Alpomania.

He is a Guinness World Record holder in the highest attitude kayaking, which he did at 6370 meters in Atacama, Chile, on 4 January 2020.

In 2022, Sypavin led the first Ukrainian Antarctic expedition to the Vinson Massif.

=== Major ascents ===
- Mount Everest — summited eight times: May 14, 2025, May 11, 2024, May 19, 2024, May 19, 2023, May 23, 2022, May 23, 2019, May 16, 2018, and May 15, 2017.

Four of these ascents were Everest–Lhotse double summits. Valentyn Sypavin achieved his eighth successful ascent of Mount Everest (8,848 m), setting a national record for the highest number of climbs by a Ukrainian mountaineer. He became the fifth climber from Kharkiv and the nineteenth Ukrainian to reach the summit of Everest.

- K2 (2021)
- Dallar, route 5B (Porokhni area)
- Peak Free Spain 5B (winter, Kizel area)
- Peak Free Spain 5B (as a pair, Kolomytsev area)
- Bashkara 5B (as a pair, Yu. Pryhoda route)
- Krumkol 6A (Timofeev route)
- Asan 6A (Horbenko route)
- Shkhara 5A (“Crab route”, in a pair)
- Mont Blanc 6A (Divine Providence route)
- Alpamayo, Peru
- Denali, Alaska — speed ascent with Iryna Halay
- Matterhorn
- Mont Blanc
- Mount Elbrus
- Mount Ararat
- Mount Damavand
- Ama Dablam
- Island Peak
- Lenin Peak
- Vinson Massif — leader of the First Ukrainian Antarctic expedition to the Vinson Massif

=== Crimean ascents ===
- Shaan-Kaya: "Samurai" 6A, "Zenith", "Hyperborea" 6A
- Marcheka: "Center" 6A, "Rainy Season" 6A, "Machombo" 6A, "Player" 6A, "DLZ" 6A
- Triangle: "Friendship" 6A
- Castle: "Falcon" 6A, "Through the Cave" 6A, "Direct" 6A

=== Seven Summits program ===
- Mount Everest (8,848 m) — China (Asia)
- Aconcagua (6,962 m) — Argentina (South America)
- Denali (6,190 m) — United States (North America)
- Mount Kilimanjaro (5,895 m) — Tanzania (Africa)
- Mount Elbrus (5,642 m) — Russia (Europe)
- Mount Vinson (4,892 m) — Antarctica
- Carstensz Pyramid (4,884 m) — highest peak of Australia and Oceania
- Mount Kosciuszko (2,228 m) — highest point of the Australian continent

=== Volcanic Seven Summits program ===
- Ojos del Salado (6,893 m) — Chile (South America)
- Kilimanjaro (5,895 m) — Tanzania (Africa)
- Elbrus (5,642 m) — Russia (Europe)
- Pico de Orizaba (5,642 m) — Mexico (North America)
- Damavand (5,671 m) — Iran (Asia)
- Mount Giluwe (4,367 m) — Papua New Guinea — ascent on 29–30 August 2025

== Rankings ==
In 2008, he became interested in ice climbing. In 2011, he ranked 4th in the world ice climbing ranking. He is a bronze medalist of the European Championship, vice world champion, and prize-winner of several World Cup stages. He was a bronze medalist in the overall World Cup standings and was in the Top 10 of the world ice climbing ranking for seven consecutive years,

Results in international competitions:

- 2011 — 3rd place — UIAA Ice Climbing World Championship, Kirov, Russia.
- 2012 — 3rd place — European Championship, Saas-Fee, Switzerland.
- 2013:
  - 2nd place — World Championship, Cheongsong, South Korea.
  - 3rd place — Overall World Cup standings.
  - 3rd place (team) — World Championship (Speed), Kirov, Russia.
- 2014:
  - 2nd place (team) — European Championship (Speed), Ufa, Russia.
  - 3rd place (team) — European Championship (Lead), Ufa, Russia.
  - 4th place — World Cup stage, Cheongsong, South Korea.
  - 6th place — World Cup stage, Busteni, Romania.
- 2015:
  - 2nd place — World Cup stage, Cheongsong, South Korea.
  - 4th place — World Championship, Rabenstein, Italy (team, Lead).
  - 3rd place — World Championship, Kirov, Russia (team, Speed).
- 2017:
  - 4th place — World Cup stage, Durango, USA.
  - 5th place — World Cup stage, Cheongsong, South Korea.
- 2019:
  - 3rd place — Final World Cup stage, Denver, USA.

Ukrainian Ice Climbing Champion: Lead discipline: 2013, 2014, 2015, 2016.

He also coached the 2019 Junior World Ice Climbing Champion — Viktoriia Holub.

=== Ice Climbing World Championships ===
	2013	2015	2017
Lead	2	4	6

=== Ice Climbing World Cup ===
	2012	2013	2014	2015	2016	2017
Overall	4	3	6	4	9	10-11
	4, (bronze) ,15, (bronze) ,9	(silver) , (bronze) ,6,6,4	4,6,-,7,6	6-8,2,8,4,-,5	14,4,-,9	4,17,5,28,17

== Personal life ==
Sypavin has worked as a fire service trainer, and also used to work as a university teacher.

Founder of the company Alpomania, which specializes in organizing expeditions and ascents to mountain peaks around the world.

== Social media ==
Platform	Link
Facebook	valentyn.sypavin
Instagram	valiksypavin
YouTube	alpomania-8801
Telegram	@alpomania_team

== Notable ascents ==
- Mount Everest five times summiteer: 16.05.2017, 15.05.2018, 23.05.2019, 23.05.2021, 19.05.2023
- K2 - Summer 2021
- Lhotse - 2021, 2023.
- Denali - 5-day speed ascent with Irina Halay in 2017
- Aconcagua
- Kilimanjaro
- Mount Vinson
- Ojos del Salado, the world's highest volcano
- Pico de Orizaba
- Damavand
