= 2022 UIAA Ice Climbing World Championships =

- Venue: Ice Dome
- Location: (Switzerland) Saas-Fee
- Dates: 26–29 January

The 2022 UIAA Ice Climbing World Championships were held from 26 to 29 January 2022 in Saas-Fee, Switzerland.

== Medal summary ==
=== Medal table ===
* Host nation (Switzerland)

Rank	Nation	Gold	Silver	Bronze	Total
1	Russian Mountaineering Federation	1	3	2	6
2	Switzerland*	1	1	1	3
3	France	1	0	1	2
4	Iran	1	0	0	1
Totals (4 entries)		4	4	4	12

=== Men ===
Event	Gold		Silver		Bronze	
Speed	Mohsen Beheshti Rad; Iran	6.90	Nikita Glazyrin; Russian Mountaineering Federation	7.24	Danila Bikulov; Russian Mountaineering Federation	7.27
Lead	Louna Ladevant; France	18.340	Benjamin Bosshard; Switzerland	17.310	Tristan Ladevant; France	15.272

=== Women ===
Event	Gold		Silver		Bronze	
Speed	Natalia Savitskaya; Russian Mountaineering Federation	9.81	Yulia Filateva; Russian Mountaineering Federation	10.55	Maria Tolokonina; Russian Mountaineering Federation	11.30
Lead	Petra Klingler; Switzerland	TOP	Anastasia Astakhova; Russian Mountaineering Federation	16.280	Franziska Schönbächler; Switzerland	15.250
