= UIAA Ice Climbing World Youth Championships =

Annual competition

2016 UIAA Youth World Championship, Italy

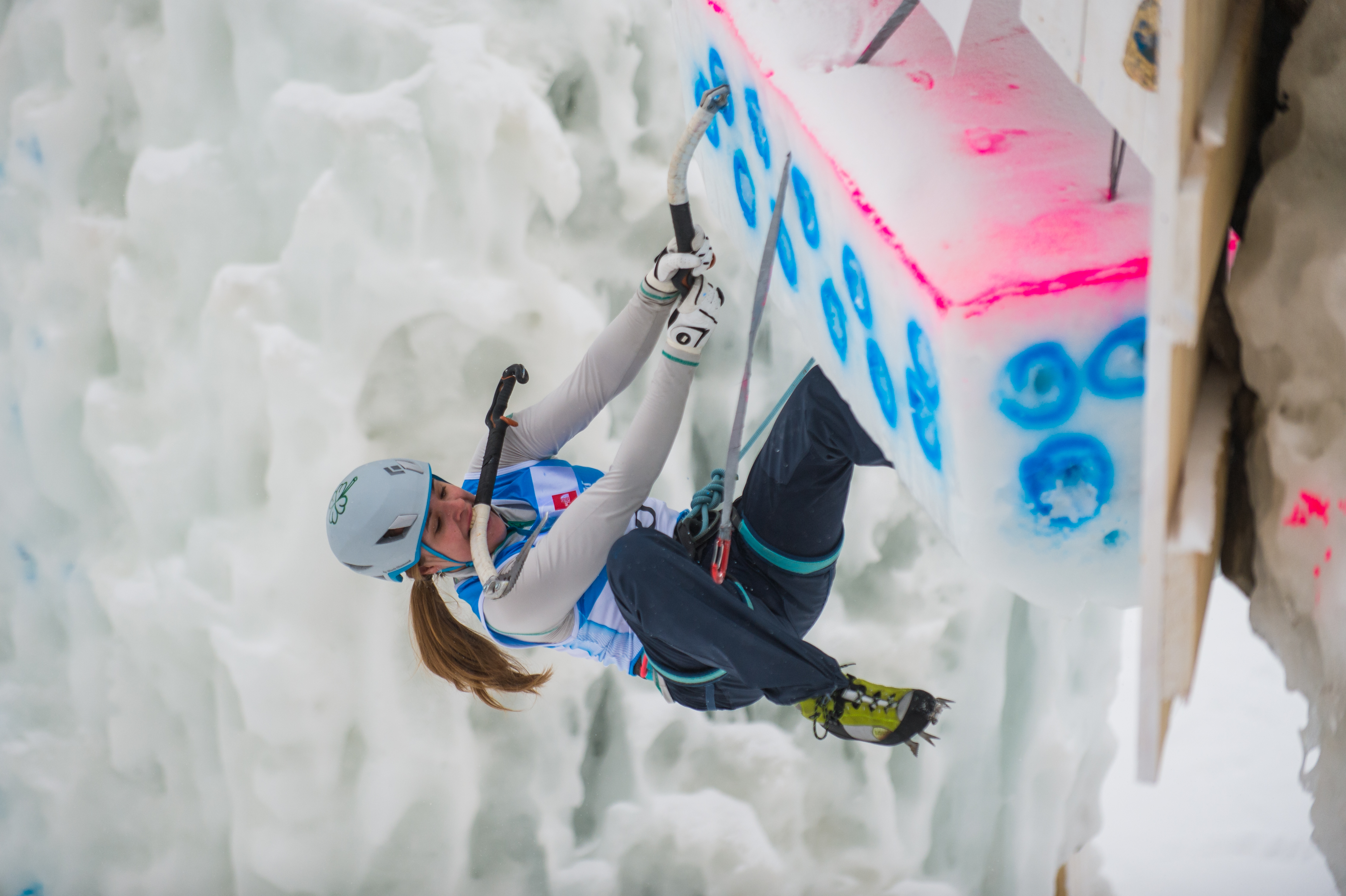
U19 Women lead climbing

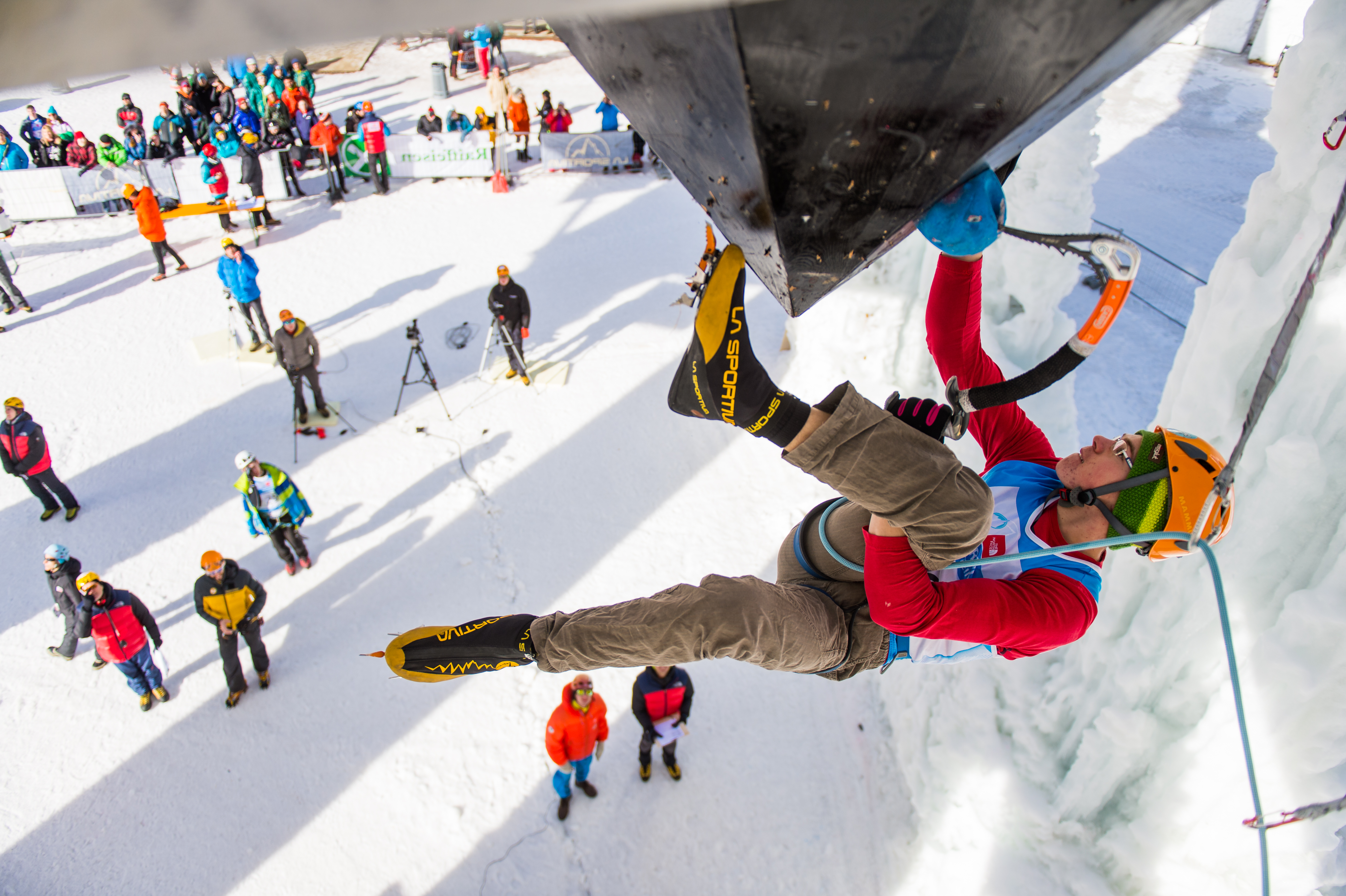
U19 Men lead climbing

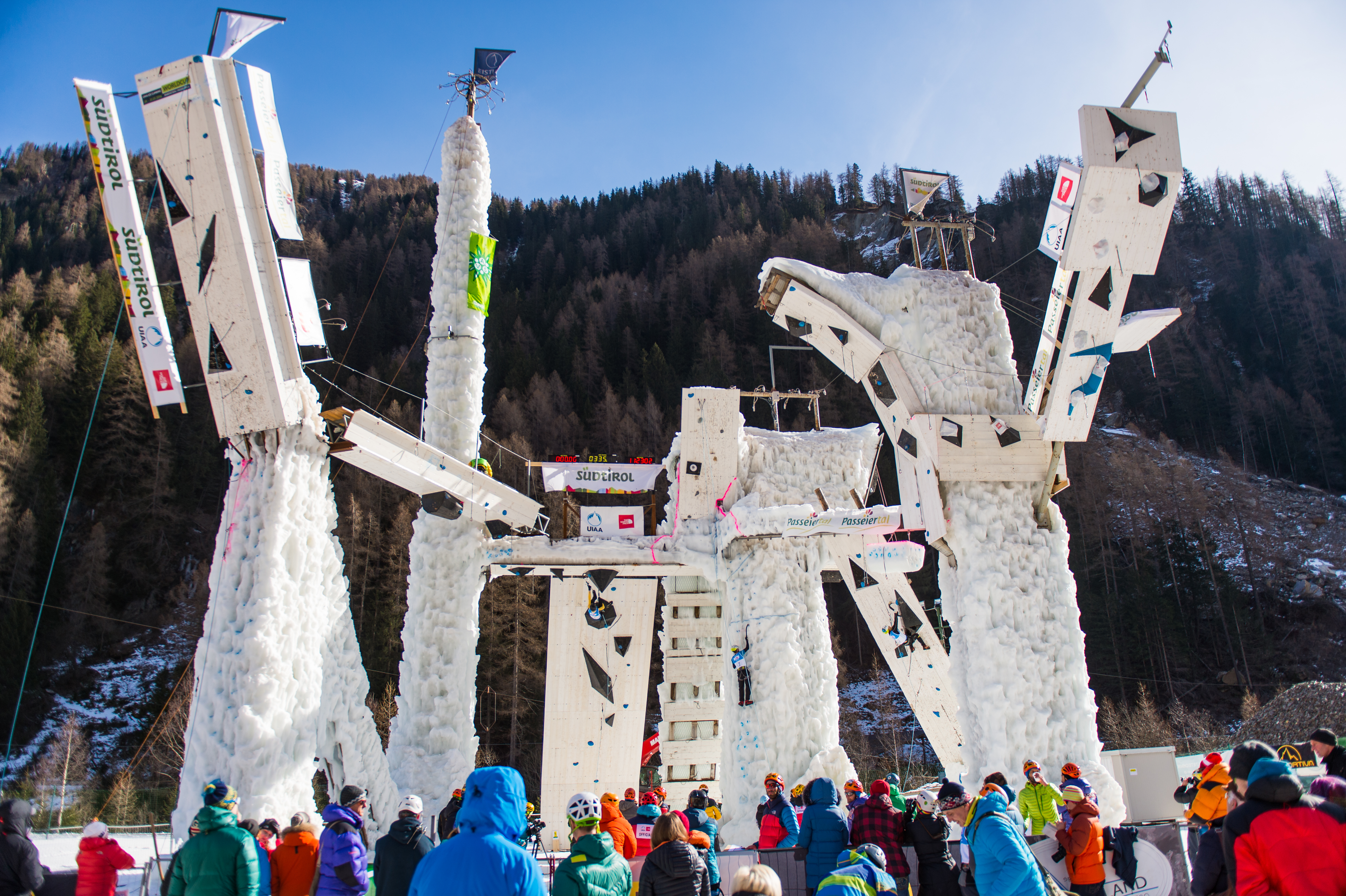
Leading climbing routes

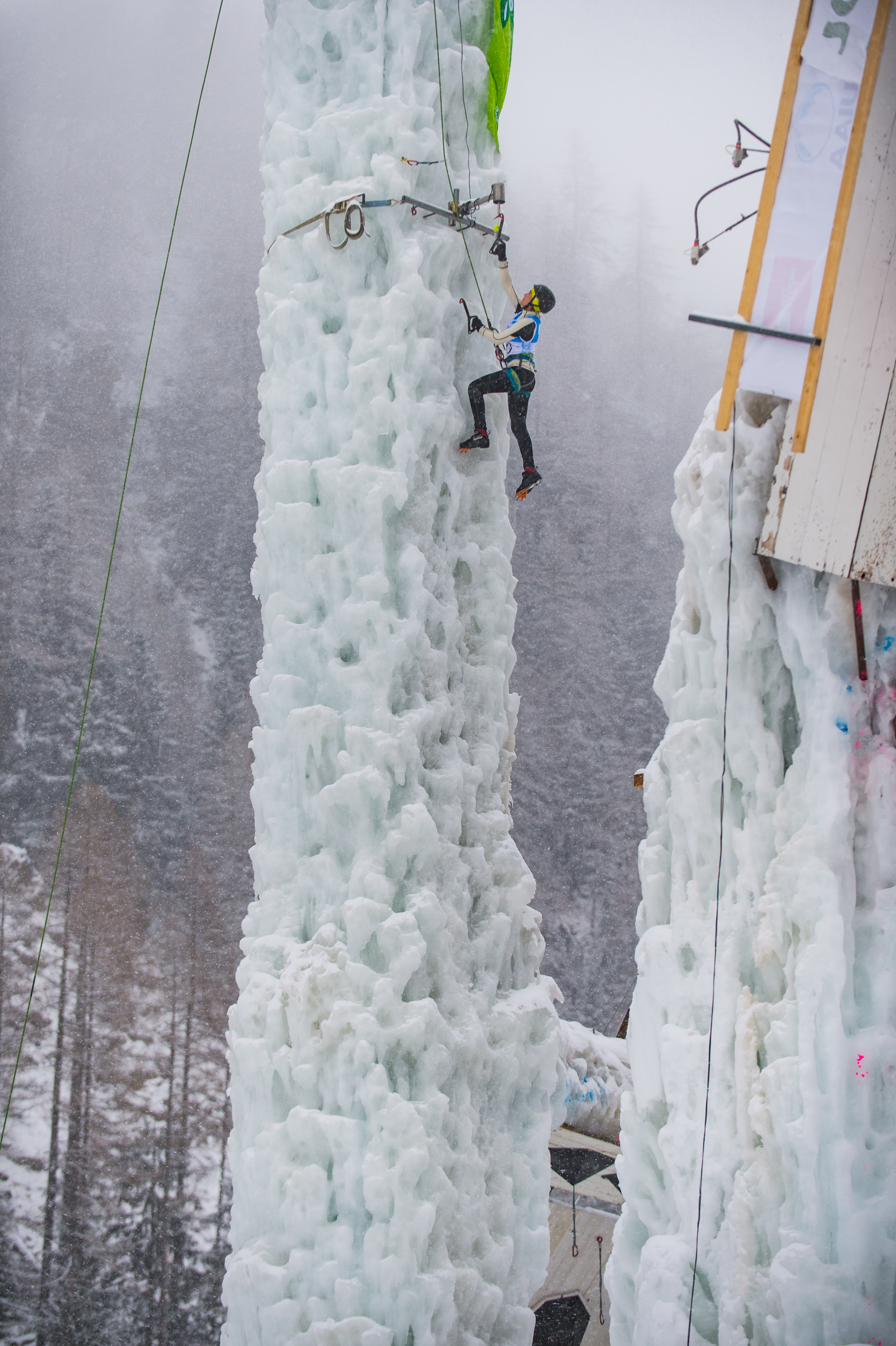
Speed routes

The Ice Climbing World Youth Championships is an annual international competition ice climbing event. It is organized by the International Climbing and Mountaineering Federation (or UIAA), who regulate and govern competition ice climbing and consists of two events: lead climbing and speed climbing.

== U16 Men ==
=== Lead ===
Year	Winner	Second	Third
2013 Saas Grund			
2014 Champagny-en-Vanoise			
2015 Saas-Fee			
2016 Rabenstein			
2017 Champagny-en-Vanoise			
2018 Malbun	(Russia) Maksim Reshetnikov	(Russia) Pavel Sadakov	(Russia) Tikhon Todarev
2019 Oulu			

=== Speed ===
Year	Winner	Second	Third
2013 Saas Grund			
2014 Champagny-en-Vanoise			
2015 Saas-Fee			
2016 Rabenstein			
2017 Champagny-en-Vanoise			
2018 Malbun	(Russia) Danila Sikulov	(Russia) Pavel Sadakov	(Russia) Maksim Reshetnikov
2019 Oulu			

== U16 Woman ==
=== Lead ===
Year	Winner	Second	Third
2013 Saas Grund			
2014 Champagny-en-Vanoise			
2015 Saas-Fee			
2016 Rabenstein			
2017 Champagny-en-Vanoise	(Russia) Evgeniia Iashkova	(Russia) Elizaveta Smerdova	(United States) Catalina Shirley
2018 Malbun	(Russia) Evgeniia Iashkova	(Russia) Daria Glotova	(Russia) Elizaveta Smerdova
2019 Oulu			

=== Speed ===
Year	Winner	Second	Third
2013 Saas Grund			
2014 Champagny-en-Vanoise			
2015 Saas-Fee			
2016 Rabenstein			
2017 Champagny-en-Vanoise			
2018 Malbun	(Russia) Olga Vylegzhanina	(Russia) Daria Glotova	(Russia) Elizaveta Smerdova
2019 Oulu			

== U19 Men ==
=== Lead ===
Year	Winner	Second	Third
2013 Saas Grund			
2014 Champagny-en-Vanoise			
2015 Saas-Fee			
2016 Rabenstein			
2017 Champagny-en-Vanoise			
2018 Malbun	(France) Louna Ladevant	(Russia) Ilia Kurochkin	(Russia) Fedor Prazdnikov
2019 Oulu			

=== Speed ===
Year	Winner	Second	Third
2013 Saas Grund			
2014 Champagny-en-Vanoise			
2015 Saas-Fee			
2016 Rabenstein			
2017 Champagny-en-Vanoise			
2018 Malbun	(Russia) Nikita Glazyrin	(Russia) Fedor Prazdnikov	(Russia) Daniil Chermenin
2019 Oulu			

== U19 Woman ==
=== Lead ===
Year	Winner	Second	Third
2013 Saas Grund			
2014 Champagny-en-Vanoise			
2015 Saas-Fee			
2016 Rabenstein			
2017 Champagny-en-Vanoise	(Switzerland) Sina Goetz	(Switzerland) Cora Vogel	(Russia) Valeria Bogdan
2018 Malbun	(Russia) Valeria Bogdan	(Russia) Iuliia Filateva	(Liechtenstein) Lea Beck
2019 Oulu			

=== Speed ===
Year	Winner	Second	Third
2013 Saas Grund			
2014 Champagny-en-Vanoise			
2015 Saas-Fee			
2016 Rabenstein			
2017 Champagny-en-Vanoise			
2018 Malbun	(Russia) Valeria Bogdan	(Russia) Iuliia Filateva	(Russia) Eva Raskoshnaja
2019 Oulu			

== U22 Men ==
=== Lead ===
Year	Winner	Second	Third
2013 Saas Grund			
2014 Champagny-en-Vanoise			
2015 Saas-Fee	(Switzerland) Kevin Huser	(France) Pierrick Fine	(Switzerland) Marco Malinowski
2016 Rabenstein	(Switzerland) Kevin Huser	(Switzerland) Alexander Werren	(United States) Justin Willis
2017 Champagny-en-Vanoise	(Switzerland) Yannick Glatthard	(Canada) Noah Beek	(Russia) Radomir Proščenko
2018 Malbun	(Switzerland) Lukas Goetz	(Iran) Sayedemad Hosseini	(South Korea) Lin Hyeongsub
2019 Oulu	(Switzerland) Yannick Glatthard	(France) Louna Ladevant	(Russia) Fedor Prazdnikov

=== Speed ===
Year	Winner	Second	Third
2013 Saas Grund			
2014 Champagny-en-Vanoise			
2015 Saas-Fee	(Russia) Vladimir Kartašev	(Russia) Leonid Malych	(Russia) Ivan Khlebnikov
2016 Rabenstein	(Russia) Vladimir Kartašev	(Russia) Vladislav Iurlov	(Russia) Ivan Khlebnikov
2017 Champagny-en-Vanoise	(Russia) Radomir Proščenko	(Russia) Vadim Malshchukov	(France) Tristan Ladevant
2018 Malbun	(Russia) Anton Sukharev	(France) Tristan Ladevant	(Russia) Vadim Malshchukov
2019 Oulu	(Russia) Vadim Malshchukov	(United States) Liam Foster	(Russia) Anton Sukharev

== U22 Woman ==
=== Lead ===
Year	Winner	Second	Third
2013 Saas Grund			
2014 Champagny-en-Vanoise			
2015 Saas-Fee	(Russia) Nadezhda Smirnova	(Russia) Alena Kočebajevová	(Russia) Ekaterina Koshcheeva
2016 Rabenstein	(Russia) Alena Kochevaeva	(Russia) Ekaterina Koshcheeva	(Russia) Nadezhda Smirnova
2017 Champagny-en-Vanoise	(Russia) Alena Kochevaeva	(Switzerland) Vivien Labarile	(United States) Hannah Langford
2018 Malbun	(Switzerland) Sina Goetz	(Switzerland) Cora Vogel	(Switzerland) Vivien Labarile
2019 Oulu	(Switzerland) Sina Goetz	(Switzerland) Vivien Labarile	(Russia) Kseniia Ivanova

=== Speed ===
Year	Winner	Second	Third
2013 Saas Grund			
2014 Champagny-en-Vanoise			
2015 Saas-Fee	(Russia) Ekaterina Koshcheeva	(Russia) Nadezhda Smirnova	(Russia) Alena Kochevaeva
2016 Rabenstein	(Russia) Ekaterina Koshcheeva	(Russia) Nadezhda Smirnova	(Russia) Alena Kochevaeva
2017 Champagny-en-Vanoise	(Switzerland) Vivien Labarlie	(France) Félicie Camelin	(Russia) Alena Kochevaeva
2018 Malbun	(Russia) Diana Galimova	(Switzerland) Vivien Labarlie	(not awarded)
2019 Oulu	(Russia) Valeria Bogdan	(Liechtenstein) Lea Beck	(Czech Republic) Aneta Loužecká

== See also ==
- UIAA Ice Climbing World Championships
- UIAA Ice Climbing World Cup
