= Grand Fond =

- Quartier
- The quartier of Grand Fond marked 31.
- Coordinates: 17°53′48″N 62°48′17″W
- Country: France
- Overseas collectivity: Saint Barthélemy

Grand Fond (French pronunciation: [ɡʁɑ̃ fɔ̃]) is a quartier of Saint Barthélemy in the Caribbean. It is located in the southeastern part of the island.
