= Mohammad Reza Safdarian =

Iranian ice Climber

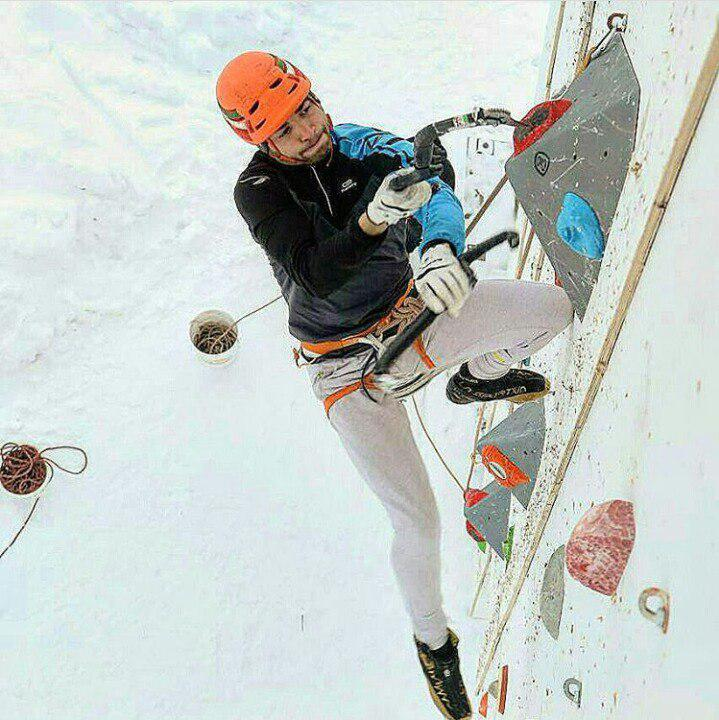

Personal information
- Native name: محمدرضا صفدریان کرویه
- Full name: Mohammad Reza Safdarian Korouyeh
- Nickname: The History boy
- Nationality: Iranian
- Born: Isfahan, Iran
- Occupation: coach

Sport
- Country: Iran
- Sport: Ice Climbing
- Events: Rock climber and Ice climber
Medal record
Event	1st	2nd	3rd
Ice Climbing World Championship	1	2	2
World Cup	1	–	1
Ice Climbing Asian Championship	1	1	1
Ice Climbing Overall Ranking	–	–	2
Total	2	3	6

Mohammad Reza Safdarian Korouyeh (Persian: محمدرضا صفدریان) is an Iranian Rock climber and Ice climber. Safdarian has won the first Gold medal in Iran′s ice climbing history in the Ice Climbing World Tour at Rabenestin in Italy, and a Bronze medal in 2018 UIAA Ice Climbing World Tour. and a Bronze medal in 2019 UIAA Ice Climbing World Combined championships. and a Bronze medal in 2018 UIAA Ice Climbing World Cup Overall Ranking Lead. The International Climbing and Mountaineering Federation named him the "History Boy". He has participated in 27 World Cups, World Championships and Asian Championships since 2013.

== Records and achievements ==
Sources:

- Gold Medal at UIAA Ice Climbing World Combined Championship (Canada 2024) Speed [source needed]*
- Gold Medal at UIAA Ice Climbing World Cup Lead (Italy 2018) [Financial Tribune](https://financialtribune.com/articles/sports/80971/ice-climber-safdarian-wins-gold-in-italy)*
- Gold Medal at UIAA Ice Climbing World Combined Championship (Swiss 2022) [source needed]*
- Bronze Medal at UIAA Ice Climbing World Combined Championship (Russia 2019) [The UIAA Official Rankings](http://theuiaa.org/documents/iceclimbing/WCC18-COMBINEDRANKINGMEN.pdf)*
- Bronze Medal at UIAA Ice Climbing Overall Ranking Lead (2018) [The UIAA Official Rankings](https://www.theuiaa.org/documents/iceclimbing/2018_Kirov-Overall-Rankings-Men-Lead-2018.pdf)*
- Bronze Medal at UIAA Ice Climbing World Cup Lead (Switzerland 2018) [The UIAA Official Rankings](https://www.theuiaa.org/documents/iceclimbing/2018_Kirov-Overall-Rankings-Men-Lead-2018.pdf)*
- Silver Medal at UIAA Ice Climbing Asian Championships, Lead (South Korea 2016) [Varzesh3](http://www.varzesh3.com/news/1499254/%D9%85%D8%AF%D8%A7%D9%84-%D8%AA%D8%A7%D8%B1%DB%8C%D8%AE%DB%8C-%D8%A8%D8%B1-%DA%AF%D8%B1%D8%AF%D9%86-%DB%8C%D8%AE-%D9%86%D9%88%D8%B1%D8%AF-%D8%A7%DB%8C%D8%B1%D8%A7%D9%86%DB%8C)*
- Bronze Medal at UIAA Ice Climbing Asian Championships, Lead (South Korea 2018) [UIAA Official](https://www.theuiaa.org)*
- Team Gold Medal at UIAA Ice Climbing Asian Championships (South Korea 2018) [UIAA Official](https://www.theuiaa.org)*
- Team Silver Medal at UIAA Ice Climbing World Championships (Russia 2018) [UIAA Official](https://www.theuiaa.org)*
- Team Silver Medal at UIAA Ice Climbing World Championships (Russia 2019) [UIAA Official](https://www.theuiaa.org)*
- Team Bronze Medal at UIAA Ice Climbing World Championships (France 2017) [UIAA Official](https://www.theuiaa.org)*
- Team Silver Medal at UIAA Ice Climbing Asian Championships (South Korea 2018) [UIAA Official](https://www.theuiaa.org)*

=== Ranks ===
- Rank 4 in UIAA Ice Climbing World Cup, Lead (Russia 2018)
- Rank 6 in UIAA Ice Climbing World Cup, Lead (South Korea 2018)
- Rank 5 in UIAA Ice Climbing World Cup, Lead (China 2018)
- Rank 6 in UIAA Ice Climbing World Cup, Speed (China 2018)
- Rank 5 in UIAA Ice Climbing World Cup, Speed (French 2017)
- Rank 8 in UIAA Ice Climbing World Championships, Difficulty of route (Italy 2017)
- Rank 7 in UIAA Ice Climbing World Cup, Speed (Italy 2017)
- Rank 7 in UIAA Ice Climbing World Cup, Difficulty of route (South Korea 2016)
- Rank 8 in UIAA Ice Climbing World Cup, Difficulty of route (Italy 2016)
- Rank 8 in UIAA Ice Climbing World Cup, Difficulty of route (Switzerland 2016)
