= Ines Papert =

German ice climber (born 1974)

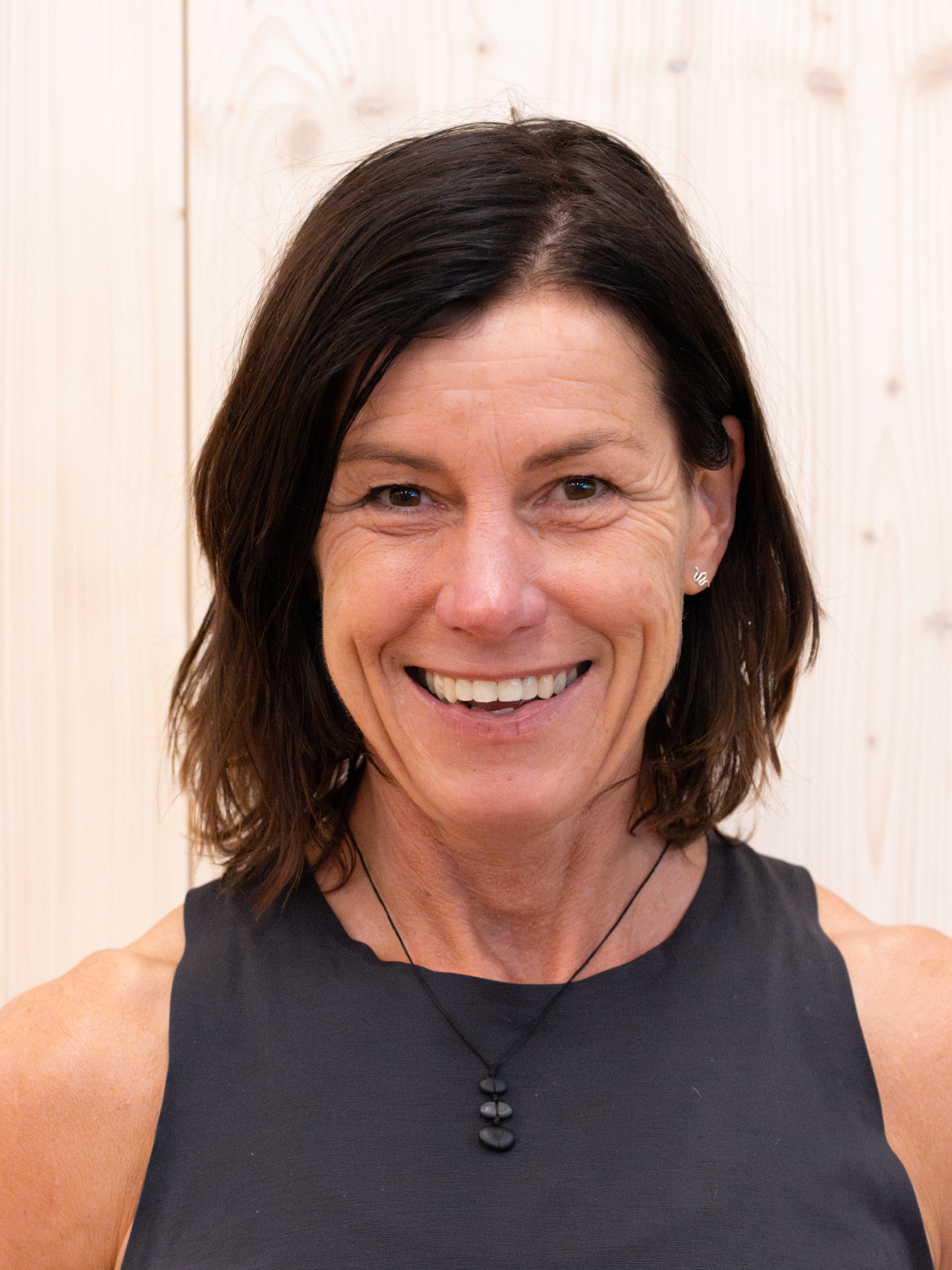

Personal information
- Born: Lutherstadt Wittenberg, Germany
- Occupations: Professional ice climber, author
- Height: 170 cm (5 ft 7 in)

Climbing career
- Type of climber: Competition climbing; Ice climbing; Mixed climbing; Alpine climbing; Traditional climbing; Sport climbing
- Updated on 17 January 2017

Ines Papert (born 5 April 1974) is a German alpine climber, and a world champion ice and mixed climber, who is best known for her competition ice climbing awards and difficult alpine ascents. She has made a number of first free ascents and has broken several difficulty grade milestones for female climbers.

== Early life ==
Ines Papert grew up in the northern Saxon town of Bad Düben, Germany. She comes from a musical family and plays piano and saxophone. After completing her education as a physiotherapist, Papert left her home in Saxony, Germany in 1993 and moved to Berchtesgaden, Bavaria in the Alps. It was only there that she discovered her interest in the mountains. She began to learn about hiking, biking, and skiing before moving on to mountain climbing. Her first major mountain climb was in 1996 on Watzmann (2713m), which is the highest peak which is entirely within Germany.

== Climbing career ==
In 2006, she won the overall Ice Climbing World Cup, and over the years she won the world cup three more times. On 13 November 2013 she made the first ascent of Likhu Chuli (6719m) in Nepal and reached the summit by herself. Ines was the first woman to climb the mixed climbing grade of M11.

=== Significant Climbs ===
- 1997 Ascension of the Aconcagua
- 1998 Peru Expedition with the ascents of Nevado Pisco, Nevado Alpamayo, Nevado Artesonraju and Torre del Paron
- 1999 Yosemite El Capitan; the route "The Nose"
- 2001 her first rock climbing route in the French eighth grade
- 2002 different (ice) climbing routes
- 2003 Eiger North Face, first red point ascent of the route "Symphonie de Liberte" (then the most difficult route on the wall) and Eiskletterrouten (Mixed) to degree (M 11)
- 2004 first rock climbing route in French degrees 8b "shadow king" in the Bavarian Alps
- 2006 redpoint climb "Pellisier" (in French degrees 8b) in the north wall of the Cima Grande.
- 2007, the first repetition of the hitherto well hardest mixed route in the world Law and Order (M 13)
- 2009 first ascent of the route "Power of Silence" '(7c +, 11 pitches) by the South Face of Middle Huey Spire in Canada.
- 2009 Ascent of the Canadian "Lotus Flower Tower" in the "Onsight" over the Southeast Pillar (6b)
- 2010 first ascent of the mixed routes "Triple X" (VIII, 8) on Ben Nevis and "Bavarinthia" (IX, 9) at the Cairngorms, Coire an Lochain in Scotland
- 2011 "Super Cirill" 9 Seachängeroute at the Parete di Sonlerto (Ticino) in grade 8a / 8a +
- 2011 "Great Walls of China" 600 meters on Mount Kyzyl Asker in Kyrgyzstan; Difficulty: ABO, WI 7+, M 7
- 2012 repetition of "Illuminati" M11 +, WI 6+, near St. Ulrich, Tyrol
- 2013 first ascent of Likhu Chuli I in Nepal, which she climbed solo.
- 2013 first ascent of the route "Azazar" (8a, 9 pitches) in the south-west wall of Tadrarate in Morocco.
- 2014 First red-point tour of the route "Without smoke you will die" (8a, 17 ropes) on the north face of the Great Trenches in Italy.
- 2015 Second ascent of the mixed route "Holy Grail" (M 12), (W15)
- 2016 Fifth ascent of "Riders on the Storm" VI 5.12d A3, the "Torre Central" ( Torres del Paine National Park ), Patagonia
- 2016, October. Successful climb of the difficult southeast face of the Kyzyl Asker 5,842m up a new route Lost in China WI5+ M6 1,200m. To acclimatize, she made the second ascent and first free ascent of Border Control WI5 M7 650m on Great Wall of China 5,000m. With Luka Lindič.

=== Competitions ===
She has won more than 20 World Cup ice-climbing events.

| Year | Place |
|---|---|
| 2000 | 2nd place in the World Cup in Saas Fee |
| 2001 | 1st place in the overall World Cup |
| 2002 | 2. Place in the overall World Cup |
| | 1st place at the World Championship in Pitztal in the disciplines "Difficulty" and "Speed" |
| 2003 | 1st place in the overall World Cup |
| 2004 | 1st place at the World Championships (Difficulty) |
| | 2nd place overall at the Ouray Ice Festival (and 1st place women's) finish |
| 2005 | 2nd place at the World Championships (Difficulty) and 1st place at bouldering |
| | 1st place at the European Championships |
| | 1st place at the Ouray Ice Festival |
| 2006 | 1st place in the overall World Cup |
| | 1st place at Ouray speed climbing competition |
| 2008 | 2nd place overall at the Ouray Ice Festival (and 1st place women's) finish |
| 2013 | 2nd place overall at Ouray Elite Mixed Climbing Competition (and 1st place women's) |
| | 1st place at Ouray Speed Climbing Competition |

== Personal ==
She now lives in Bayerisch Gmain. On 22 August 2000, she became a mother to her son Emanuel.

== Bibliography ==
- Ines Papert: "Vertical: Life on the Steepest Faces" . Delius Klasing, Hamburg 2012 ISBN 978-3-7688-3521-3
