= Champagny-en-Vanoise =

- Commune
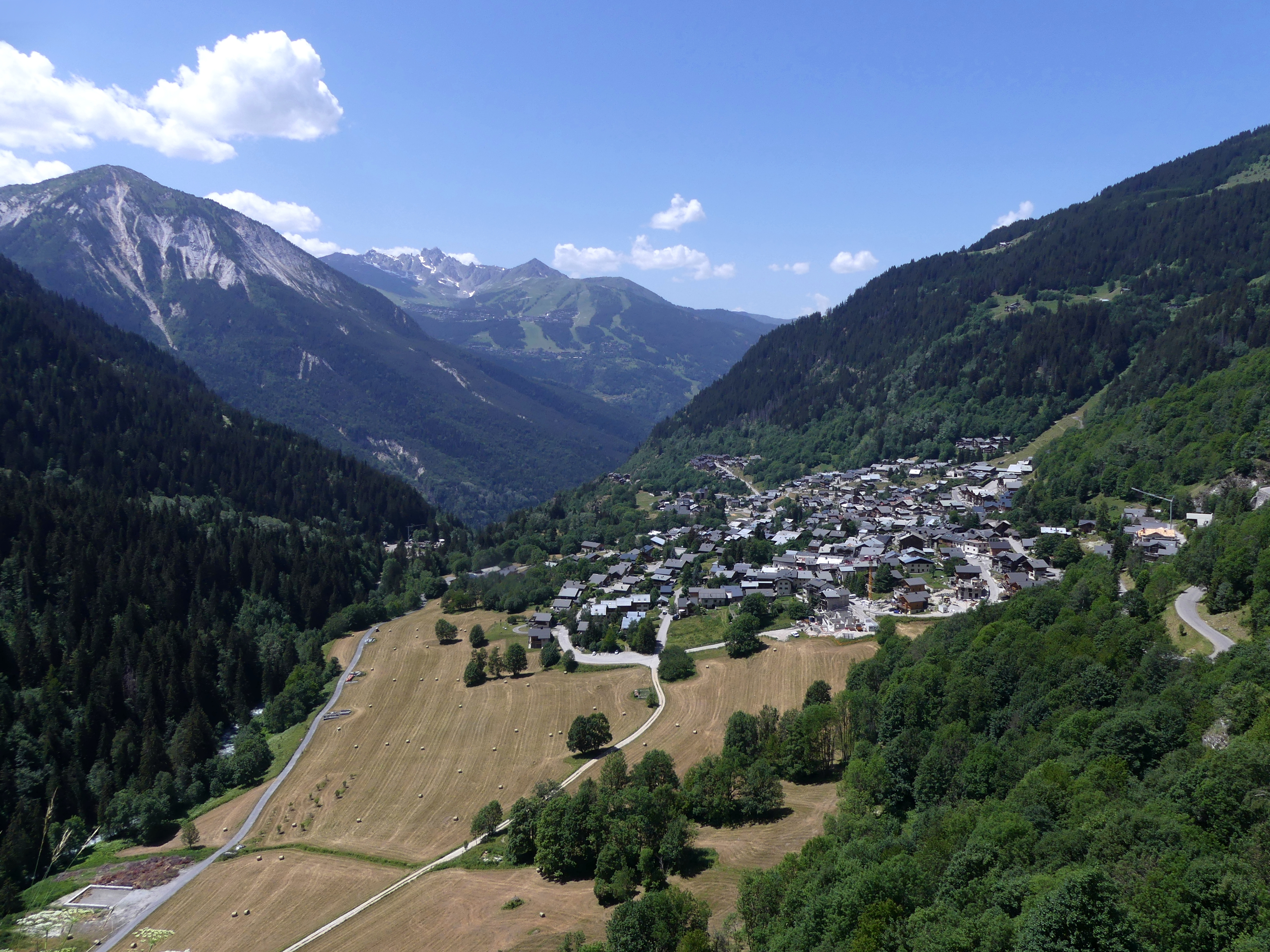
- An aerial view of Champagny-en-Vanoise
- Location of Champagny-en-Vanoise
- Location within France Location within Auvergne-Rhône-Alpes
- Coordinates: 45°27′19″N 6°41′36″E
- Country: France
- Region: Auvergne-Rhône-Alpes
- Department: Savoie
- Arrondissement: Albertville
- Canton: Moûtiers
- Intercommunality: Val Vanoise

Government
  - Mayor (2020–2026): René Ruffier-Lanche
- Area^{1}: 84.96 km^{2} (32.80 sq mi)
- Highest elevation: 3,855 m (12,648 ft)
- Lowest elevation: 960 m (3,150 ft)
- Population (2023): 540
  - Density: 6.4/km^{2} (16/sq mi)
- Time zone: UTC+01:00 (CET)
  - Summer (DST): UTC+02:00 (CEST)
- INSEE/Postal code: 73071 /73350
- ^{1} French Land Register data, which excludes lakes, ponds, glaciers > 1 km^{2} (0.386 sq mi or 247 acres) and river estuaries.

Champagny-en-Vanoise (French pronunciation: [ʃɑ̃paɲi ɑ̃ vanwaz], lit. 'Champagny in Vanoise'; Arpitan: Champègni) is a commune in the Savoie department in the Auvergne-Rhône-Alpes region in south-eastern France. It is also known for the skiing and snow-boarding slopes.

== History ==
The earliest person known to have inhabited the region of Champagny-en-Vanoise was in 2500 B.C. being uncovered in the Bozel Valley.

In antiquity the Celtic Ceutron tribe occupied the valley until the Romans annexed it (1st century BCE). During the Middle Ages Champagny-en-Vanoise lay within the County (later Duchy) of Savoy and was part of the Tarentaise ecclesiastical territory. Local tradition even holds that Pope Innocent V (Pierre de Tarentaise, who died 1276) was born in the hamlet of Friburge. However, this is contested by many historians

Originally called 'Champagny'

The present Church of Saint-Sigismond (in Champagny-le-Bas) dates from a Baroque rebuilding in 1683. With this containing an elaborately carved altarpiece and “poutre de gloire” that are listed as historical monuments. Several small chapels also appear in local records from the 16th–17th centuries (e.g. the Friburge Notre-Dame-des-Grâces chapel mentioned in 1599)

Over the early modern era Champagny-en-Vanoise remained a small agrarian community; its population peaked around 823 in 1848, before declining as industrialization elsewhere drew away the youth.

Throughout the 19th century and into the early 20th, Champagny-en-Vanoise's economy was dominated by subsistence farming and alpine pasturing. Farmers grazed cows and sheep on high summer pastures and made local cheeses (especially Beaufort, of which Champagny-en-Vanoise has a small AOP production)

A few villagers found work in nearby industries: for example, the Villard-du-Planay was a textile factory resorting to seasonal Alpine labor.

The opening of nearby spa resorts (Brides-les-Bains and thermal baths at Peisey in the 1820s) brought occasional tourism traffic through Champagny.

Champagny was annexed by France, taken from the Kingdom of Sardinia (Piedmont-Sardinia) in 1860, becoming a commune of Savoie département.

In the 1950s–60s Champagny started building Ski resorts as to boost tourism in the area. In 1959 Champagny built its first ski lifts (the Nourgeval and Plan Roulant drag lifts) and opened a holiday camp (Joie et Soleil) A major turning point came in 1965, when Mayor Michel Renaud (in office 1959–77) held a referendum on joining the new La Plagne ski area. The vote passed, and that year lifts began construction on an experimental link: a chairlift to the high-altitude site of La Rossa and two surface tows (Grand Fond and Borseliers). In 1971 the definitive link to La Plagne opened: a faster chairlift connecting Champagny to the Nancroix Valley of La Plagne

In 1970 the region's name was changed to 'Champagny-en-Vanoise' (English: Champagny in Vanois)

== See also ==
- Friburge
- Communes of the Savoie department
